= Como, Yeronga =

Como
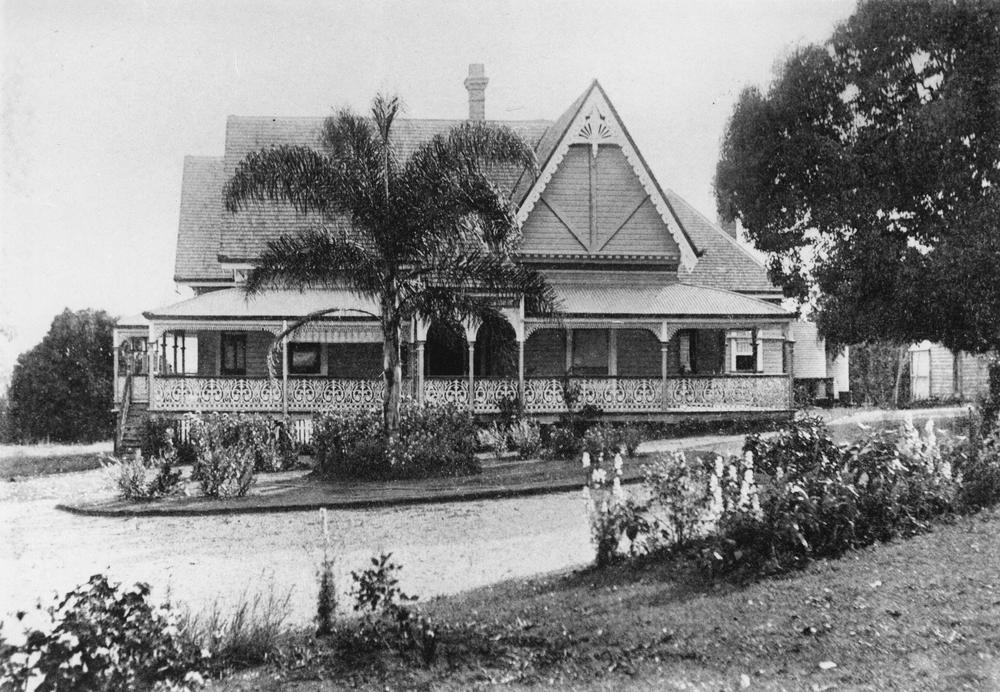
- Como (later Barrogill), circa 1921

- Location within Queensland Location within Australia
- 27.5157°S 153.0122°E
- Location: 88 Kadumba Street, Yeronga, City of Brisbane, Queensland, Australia

History
- Design period: 1870s–1890s (late 19th century)
- Built: 1889–1890
- Built for: James Walter Hayne

Site notes
- Architect: Alexander Brown Wilson

Queensland Heritage Register
- Official name: Como, Barrogill
- Type: state heritage (built, landscape)
- Designated: 25 August 2000
- Reference no.: 601474
- Significant period: 1880s–1890s (fabric, historical)
- Significant components: stained glass window/s, residential accommodation – main house, garden/grounds, trees/plantings, carriage way/drive
- Builders: Mr Peterson

Como is a heritage-listed villa at 88 Kadumba Street, Yeronga, City of Brisbane, Queensland, Australia. It was designed by Alexander Brown Wilson and built from 1889 to 1890 by Mr Peterson. It is also known as Barrogill. It was added to the Queensland Heritage Register on 25 August 2000.

== History ==
Como, known later as Barrogill, was erected in 1889–90 for Brisbane businessman James Walter Hayne, who had acquired the site in October 1889. The architect was Alexander Brown Wilson, and the contractor, accepted in late 1889, was a Mr Peterson, with a tender of £999, the work to be completed by February 1890.

The house was erected during an important phase in the development of Yeronga. The Yeronga pocket, which fronts the Brisbane River on the eastern side of the Long Pocket Reach, had been taken up for farming purposes in the early 1850s. In the mid-1860s, part of portion 7 (the Kadumba Street area) was subdivided into large residential allotments fronting the river, but in the 1880s, the area suddenly became a fashionable suburban address. The impetus for successful Brisbane businessmen, lawyers, politicians, and civil servants to establish large residences on the river at Yeronga, came with the construction of the South Brisbane rail line from Corinda to Stanley Street, which opened in 1884 and followed Fairfield Road for much of the way.

The majority of fine 1880s and 1890s houses erected in the Yeronga area were built from 1885, following the opening of Yeronga Station that year. Only a few of these residences survive to illustrate the late 19th century development of Yeronga as a middle-class commuter suburb. Amongst those remaining are Como (1889–90) and solicitor Adolph Feez's home Astolat (c. 1890), which occupy adjacent sites on the southern side of Kadumba Street; Rhyndarra (1889) at the end of Kadumba Street; and Avoca (c. 1880) in nearby Feez Street.

Yeronga-Lea (c. 1883), the earliest of the large homes erected in the area, no longer survives. The residence of newspaperman and politician Charles Hardie Buzacott, and of Queensland Premier Thomas Joseph Byrnes in the late 1880s and 1890s, Yeronga-Lea was located on the riverbank, on about nine acres of land adjoining the southern boundary of what became the Hayne property. Reputedly, the suburb derives its name from this house. In 1885, the Railway Department named the local station after Mr Buzacott's home, and by January 1886, local residents universally referred to the area as Yeronga, distinguishing themselves from the more generic term of Boggo, the early name for the whole of the district between Clarence Corner and Oxley. Kadumba, erected c. 1885 for the Grimes family, which had owned farming land at Fairfield/Yeronga/Yeerongpilly since the 1870s, is no longer extant, its name perpetuated in one of the suburb's principal streets.

Alexander Brown Wilson, the designer of Como, was a highly respected Brisbane architect who had developed a substantial practice by the late 1880s. His domestic work included Kinauld in Highgate Hill, erected in the late 1880s, and Lamb House, the landmark house in Leopard Street at Kangaroo Point, built for the Lamb family in 1902. Wilson also designed the Mowbraytown Presbyterian Church in 1885 and additions to the Ann Street Presbyterian Church in 1897. His commercial architecture included the Plough Inn at South Brisbane, constructed in 1885.

James Walter Hayne, for whom Como was commissioned, was born in England in 1852 and emigrated to Queensland in 1864 with his parents, who settled in Ipswich. In 1877, he moved to Brisbane and entered the ironmongery firm of Perry Brothers, working his way up to chief clerk and accountant. In 1885, he left Perry Brothers and established a house and land agency in Brisbane, and in the 1890s, entered the boot trade. From at least 1909 until c. 1920, he was the Queensland representative of the Sydney Morning Herald and Sydney Mail. At the time his new home was being constructed at Yeronga in 1889–90, Hayne was auditor for the South Brisbane Municipal Council, and secretary of various public companies. He resided at Yeronga with his wife and three daughters only until the late 1890s, but appears to have retained Como until 1915. Reputedly, James Walter Hayne and his neighbour, Adolph Feez, kept on their properties the kennels for the Brisbane Hunt Club, which flourished in Yeronga in the late 1880s and 1890s.

Thomas Lahey, of sawmillers and timber merchants Lahey Brothers & Nicklin, occupied Como from c. 1901-c. 1907. David Cannon, a western Queensland station owner, hotel proprietor and former Longreach and Barcoo Shire councillor, "retired" to Como in 1912, and in February 1915, the title to the Yeronga property was transferred to Margaret Cannon, his wife. Mrs Cannon died in 1923, following which the property passed to the Union Trustee Company of Australia Ltd. In 1925, Como was occupied by another semi-retired western Queensland grazier, Thomas Purcell of Galway Downs near Windorah, and in 1933 the title to the property was transferred to his widow, Subyna Purcell. Mrs Purcell had left Como by that stage, and from 1932 to 1935 the house was occupied by William Edward Gardner. In 1954, the property was acquired by Emily Perla Brown, and transferred the same year to Donald and Elsie Rosie. The Rosies renamed the house Barrogill, after a castle in Scotland, and in 1958 subdivided the land into five allotments. In 1968, a two-bedroom, self-contained annex to the house was constructed, to plans drawn by Bligh Jessop Bretnall architects. The house was retained by the Rosie family until 1993.

== Description ==
Como, a picturesque substantial single-storeyed timber residence, with steeply pitched corrugated iron roofs, appears on the rise of Kadumba Street framed by its large trees. The house is one of a group of three adjacent substantial late nineteenth century timber residences on Kadumba Street screened by a streetscape of mature trees, and contributes to both the streetscape of Kadumba Street and the townscape of Yeronga.

The house comprises a picturesque composition of steep, decorated gables, encircled by verandahs. To the north, the line of the verandah roof is broken by an entry portico with a hipped roof. The residence is lined with deep chamferboard, has sliding sash windows, and sits on a brick base. The verandah has a gently curved corrugated roof, and cast iron valances and balustrades.

The residence exterior includes some fine decorative detailing. The gables have timber cross-braces, scalloped barge-boards and fretwork at the peaks. The roof is separated from the verandah by a stepped cornice with dentils. The entry portico has a pair of timber panelled arches with keystones, surmounted by a cornice with dentils.

The garden contains fine, mature trees. A row of mango trees lines the south western edge of the site; a large camphor laurel is centrally located in the northern yard; several mango trees line the northern boundary, and a tall hoop pine marks the driveway entrance.

In 1993, the house was described in an auction notice as having:

"... Wide entrance hall. 4 bedrooms. Formal lounge. Dining room with fireplace. Large sitting room. Reading lounge with fireplaces...Attic. High 3.66 metre ceilings".

A newspaper article from the same year described:

"...front door spectacular stained glass side and fanlights featuring hand-painted birds and butterflies".

== Heritage listing ==
Como was listed on the Queensland Heritage Register on 25 August 2000 having satisfied the following criteria.

The place is important in demonstrating the evolution or pattern of Queensland's history.

Barrogill survives as an important illustration of the late 19th century transformation of Yeronga from small farming community to prestigious residential commuter suburb. From a broader perspective, it is important in illustrating the effect that access to rail transport in the late 19th century had on Brisbane's urban environment, creating in the 1870s and 1880s a string of "outer" suburbs along the new railway lines into the capital. The place also illustrates the nature of Queensland's first generation of suburban rail commuters - principally the affluent middle-class. With the construction of this and other houses of similar status in the area in the late 19th century (including adjacent Astolat), the tone of the suburb as a quiet, middle-class residential retreat was established, and sustained into the second half of the 20th century.

The place is important in demonstrating the principal characteristics of a particular class of cultural places.

Barrogill is a substantial picturesque timber residence set in a fine garden of mature trees, which appears on the rise of Kadumba Street framed by its large trees.

The house is a substantially intact example of the domestic work of important Brisbane architect AB Wilson.

The place is important because of its aesthetic significance.

As the most visible of a group of substantial late 19th and early 20th century timber residences on Kadumba Street, the building and grounds contribute significantly to the streetscape of Kadumba Street and the townscape of Yeronga.

The place has a special association with the life or work of a particular person, group or organisation of importance in Queensland's history.

The house is a substantially intact example of the domestic work of Brisbane architect AB Wilson.
