= Astolat, Yeronga =

Astolat residence, Yeronga
- Location within Queensland Location within Australia
- 27.5155°S 153.0118°E
- Location: 96 Kadumba Street, Yeronga, City of Brisbane, Queensland, Australia

History
- Design period: 1870s–1890s (late 19th century)
- Built: c. 1890–c. 1890

Queensland Heritage Register
- Official name: Astolat
- Type: state heritage (built, landscape)
- Designated: 25 August 2000
- Reference no.: 601473
- Significant period: 1890s (fabric, historical)
- Significant components: carriage way/drive, trees/plantings, garden/grounds, residential accommodation – main house

Astolat is a heritage-listed villa at 96 Kadumba Street, Yeronga, City of Brisbane, Queensland, Australia. It was built from c. 1890 to c. 1890. It was added to the Queensland Heritage Register on 25 August 2000.

== History ==
Astolat was erected c. 1890 for Brisbane solicitor Adolph Frederick Milford Feez, following transfer of the 2 acres (0.81 ha) 20 perches (510 m^{2}) site to Albrecht Feez, his father, in April 1890. It is thought to have been designed by Brisbane architect George Henry Male Addison.

The house was erected during an important phase in the development of Yeronga. The Yeronga pocket, which fronts the Brisbane River on the eastern side of the Long Pocket Reach, had been taken up for farming purposes in the early 1850s. In the mid-1860s, part of portion 7 (the Kadumba Street area) was subdivided into large residential allotments fronting the river, but in the 1880s, the area suddenly became a fashionable suburban address. The impetus for successful Brisbane businessmen, lawyers, politicians, and civil servants to establish large residences on the river at Yeronga, came with the construction of the South Brisbane rail line from Corinda to Stanley Street, which opened in 1884 and followed Fairfield Road for much of the way.

The majority of fine 1880s and 1890s houses erected in the Yeronga area were built from 1885, following the opening of Yeronga Station that year. Only a few of these residences survive to illustrate the late 19th century development of Yeronga as a middle-class commuter suburb. Amongst those remaining are Como (1889–90) and solicitor Adolph Feez's home Astolat (c. 1890), which occupy adjacent sites on the southern side of Kadumba Street; Rhyndarra (1889) at the western end of Kadumba Street; and Avoca (c. 1880s) in nearby Feez Street.

Yeronga-Lea (c. 1883), the earliest of the large homes erected in the area, no longer survives. The residence of newspaperman and politician Charles Hardie Buzacott, and of Queensland Premier Thomas Joseph Byrnes in the late 1880s and 1890s, Yeronga-Lea was located on the riverbank, on about 9 acres (3.6 ha) of land adjoining the southern boundary of what became the Hayne property. Reputedly, the suburb derives its name from this house. In 1885 the Railway Department named the local station after Mr Buzacott's home, and by January 1886, local residents universally referred to the area as Yeronga, distinguishing themselves from the more generic term of Boggo, the early name for the whole of the district between Clarence Corner and Oxley. Kadumba, erected c. 1885 for the Grimes family, which had owned farming land at Fairfield/Yeronga/Yeerongpilly since the 1870s, is no longer extant, its name perpetuated in one of the suburb's principal streets.

Astolat may have been designed by respected Brisbane architect GHM Addison of the Melbourne-based firm Oakden, Addison & Kemp, who had called tenders for a house at Indooroopilly for Arthur Feez, Adolph's brother, in late 1887. The verandah detailing and the bay window expressed in the roof by a chamfered hip, are reminiscent of other Addison domestic designs of this period, including Ralahyne (1888), Kirkston (1888–89), and the 1888 extensions to Stanley Hall.

The name Astolat is associated with the Arthurian legend, and was mentioned in Sir Thomas Malory's Morte d'Arthur, published in England in the 15th century. Elaine, maid of Astolat, drowned herself for the love of Sir Lancelot, Knight of the Round Table. The Feez family appears to have had some fascination for the legend - Adolph Feez's first child, born on 7 March 1890, was christened Elaine.

Adolph Feez, for whom Astolat was commissioned, was born in Brisbane in 1858, son of Rockhampton businessman and politician Colonel Albrecht Feez and Sophia Milford, daughter of Moreton Bay's first Supreme Court Judge Samuel Milford. Educated in Rockhampton and Sydney, he spent several years surveying in the Riverina and in western Queensland before taking up law. Gaining legal experience in Melbourne, Charters Towers and Cairns, he completed his articles with Peter MacPherson in Brisbane, and was admitted as a solicitor on 1 December 1885. From 1 January 1886, he was a partner in the firm of MacPherson, Miskin and Feez, solicitors. Miskin retired not long after and the firm carried on as MacPherson and Feez, and were retained in some of the major litigation of the 1890s. The partnership was dissolved c. 1900, following which Feez practised under his own name until 1905, when he entered into partnership with Arthur Baynes. In 1912, AFT Ruthning joined the partnership, and from 1927 the firm was known as Feez Ruthning and Company, and continues as Feez Ruthning. After nearly 60 years in the legal profession, Adolph Feez retired from practice in 1942.

Feez was a keen sportsman. He represented Queensland in Rugby Union, was an early Master of the Hunt with the Brisbane Hunt Club, founded the Queensland Polo Association, and was a foundation member of the Queensland Lawn Tennis Association. The Brisbane Hunt Club survived for about eight years in the late 1880s and 1890s, with draghunts held usually in the Yeronga district. Reputedly, Feez and his neighbour, JW Hayne, kept the kennels for the Hunt Club on their properties.

Following Albrecht Feez's death in 1896, the property passed to his two sons, Adolph and Arthur, as trustees. Arthur died in 1935, and Adolph's wife, Kate Elise Feez, was nominated trustee in his place. In the late 1930s the property was subdivided, at which time Astolat Street was formed, and by 1947 the Feez family had sold all the subdivisions apart from that on which the house stood.

Adolph Feez died at Astolat on 13 October 1944, survived by his wife and children. His son, Cecil Molle Feez, was appointed a trustee of the property in Adolph's place. Mrs Feez remained at Astolat until 1949, when the property was sold to Stanley Samuel Carrick. It remained in the Carrick family until acquired in 1963 by Dr Kenneth Wilson and his wife Jocelyn, and was transferred in 1980 to the present owners.

== Description ==
Astolat is a picturesque single-storeyed timber residence, with a corrugated iron roofs and timber verandahs. It sits towards the rear of a wedge-shaped block, and has a front garden with mature trees and a circular drive. The house is one of a group of three adjacent substantial late 19th and early 20th century timber residences on Kadumba St screened by a streetscape of mature trees, and contributes to both the streetscape of Kadumba St and the townscape of Yeronga.

The house has an L-shaped plan, with a hipped primary roof encircled by a raked verandah roof. It has verandahs to the north and the west, and a projecting hexagonal bay at the north west corner. A wide set of timber stairs extends out to the north east from the hexagonal bay.

The house is lined with deep chamferboards and rests on a brick base with screened panels. It has timber double doors with fanlights and louvred outer leaves opening onto the verandah. The verandah has square timber posts with square capitals and arched timber valances, surmounted by spandrels with fine lattice battening, and cast iron balustrades.

== Heritage listing ==
Astolat was listed on the Queensland Heritage Register on 25 August 2000 having satisfied the following criteria.

The place is important in demonstrating the evolution or pattern of Queensland's history.

Astolat survives as an important illustration of the late 19th century transformation of Yeronga from small farming community to prestigious residential commuter suburb. From a broader perspective, it is important in illustrating the effect that access to rail transport in the late 19th century had on Brisbane's urban environment, creating in the 1870s and 1880s a string of "outer" suburbs along the new railway lines into the capital. The place also illustrates the nature of Queensland's first generation of suburban rail commuters - principally the affluent middle-class. With the construction of this and other houses of similar status in the area in the late 19th century (including adjacent Como/Barrogill), the tone of the suburb as a quiet, middle-class residential retreat was established, and sustained into the second half of the 20th century.

The place has potential to yield information that will contribute to an understanding of Queensland's history.

It has the potential to reveal further information about late 19th/early 20th century Brisbane architects and their work, and may prove to be a fine example of the domestic work of important Brisbane architect GHM Addison.

The place is important in demonstrating the principal characteristics of a particular class of cultural places.

Astolat is a substantial picturesque timber residence set in a garden of mature trees.

The place is important because of its aesthetic significance.

As one of a group of substantial late 19th and early 20th century timber residences on Kadumba Street, the building contributes to both the streetscape of Kadumba Street and the townscape of Yeronga.

The place has a special association with the life or work of a particular person, group or organisation of importance in Queensland's history.

The place is significant for its long association with the Feez family.
