= Yeronga Memorial Park =

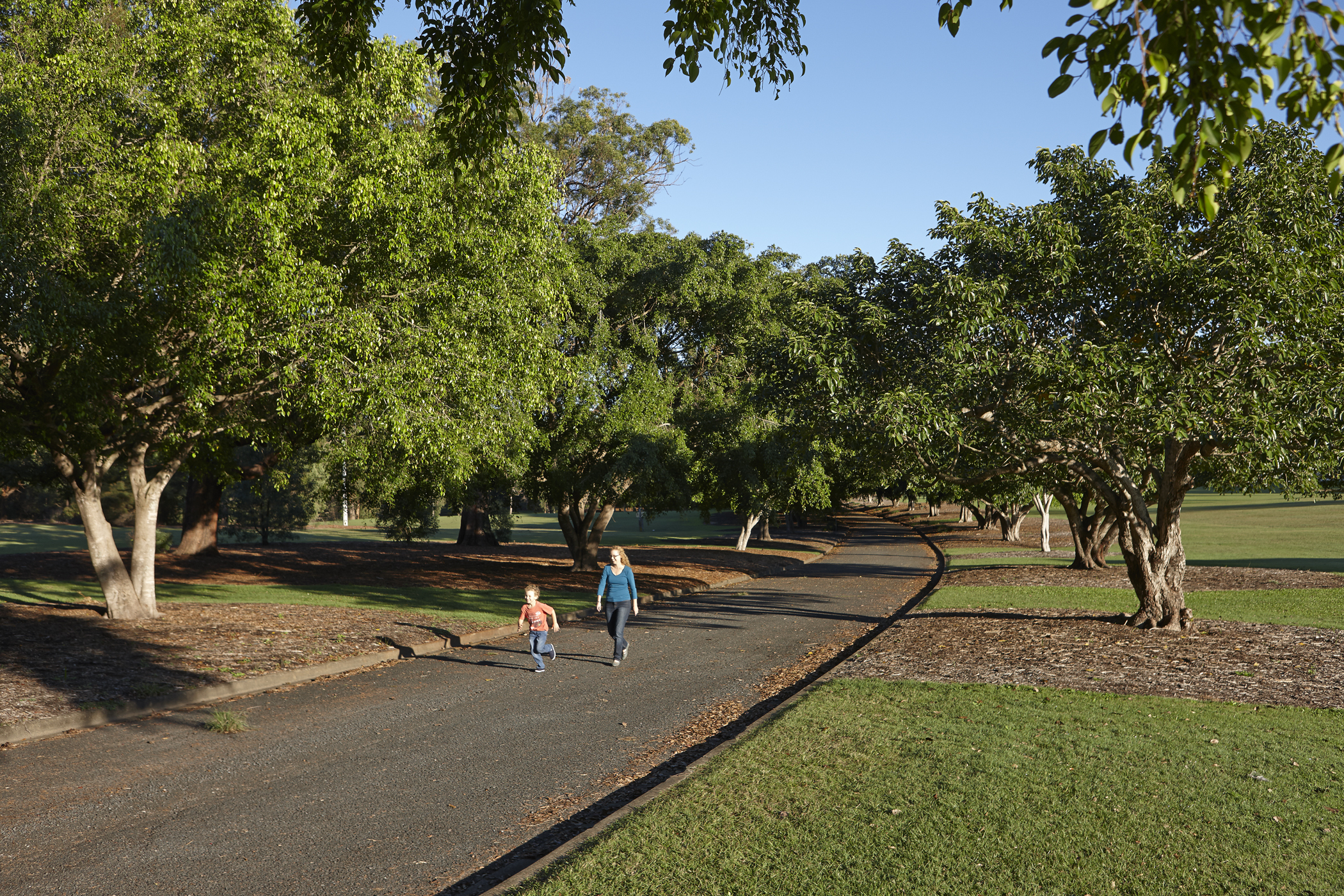
- Honour Avenue in Yeronga Memorial Park

- Location within Queensland
- 27.5197°S 153.0242°E
- Location: Ipswich Road, Yeronga, City of Brisbane, Queensland, Australia

History
- Design period: 1870s–1890s (late 19th century)
- Built: 1882

Site notes
- Owner: Brisbane City Council

Queensland Heritage Register
- Official name: Yeronga Memorial Park
- Type: state heritage (landscape, built)
- Designated: 2 December 2005
- Reference no.: 602462
- Significant period: 1917–1960s (fabric); 1882, 1888, 1917–1921, 1942–1945 (historical); 1882–ongoing (social)
- Significant components: memorial – pavilion, trees – remnant scrub, wall/s – retaining, tree groups – avenue of, memorial – rock/stone/boulder, hall – cwa, memorial – swimming pool, trees/plantings, croquet lawn, road/roadway, clubroom/s / clubhouse, memorial – gate/s, memorial – tree/avenue of trees, bowling green, hall – scouts / guides, terracing, oval/sports field, shed/s, pathway/walkway

Yeronga Memorial Park is a heritage-listed park at Ipswich Road, Yeronga, City of Brisbane, Queensland, Australia. The park has an area of 224,600 square metres (2,418,000 sq ft) and is one of the oldest in Brisbane, having been established in 1882, and has been a World War I memorial since 1917. It was added to the Queensland Heritage Register on 2 December 2005.

== History ==
Yeronga Memorial Park is bounded by Ipswich Road to the east, Villa Street to the north, Park Road to the west, and School Road to the south. Its evolution has reflected the development of Yeronga and a number of important themes and events in Queensland's history.

The area was inhabited by the Coorparoo or Yerongpan clans of the Jagera tribe before the arrival of Europeans, and continued to be used by them for some time after the establishment of a convict settlement Brisbane in 1824. The area was then used by Europeans to depasture sheep from the Government Farm in Oxley.

Development of the Darling Downs made the Ipswich Road the main route to the interior, and the initial rough track was surveyed in the 1860s. The first sales of Crown land in the Yeronga area, involving 154 acres, had taken place in 1854. Land use in the area moved towards dairying and crops, including arrowroot, cotton, sugar, corn and potatoes. In 1879, the Queensland Government established a system of local government in Queensland. At that time, Yeronga was situated within the Yeerongpilly Division (a local government area) administered by the Yeerongpilly Divisional Board. The Yeerongpilly Division originally extended from Brisbane south to the Logan River and from Mount Gravatt to Goodna.

In 1882 the Yeerongpilly Divisional Board declared 419,900 square metres (4,520,000 sq ft) of land off Ipswich Road to be a Public Park and Recreation Ground. In 1886 the Stephens Division (about nine square miles, and including Yeronga) was split off from Yerongpilly Division, putting the park within the Stephens Division, which in 1888 made 417,400 square metres (4,493,000 sq ft) of the park a permanent reserve.

The first major boost to development around Yeronga occurred when the South Brisbane to Corinda railway link was opened in 1884 including the Yeronga railway station. The railway link initiated Yeronga's popularity as a residential suburb. By 1887 the Stephens Division had a population of 3480, and by the 1890s Yeronga had become popular with the elite, with grand homes intermingling with farming estates and small subdivisions. In 1903, Stephens Division became Stephens Shire. The second main phase of development at Yeronga was again transport-related; it began after the Ipswich Road tramline reached Yeronga Park in 1915.

Yeronga Memorial Park is one of the oldest parks in Brisbane. In 1882 103 acres and three roods (41.9 hectares), of portions 153A, 154A, and 155A Parish of Yeerongpilly, County of Stanley, was declared a reserve for a Public Park and Recreation Ground. In 1888 102 acres, three roods and 62 perches were declared a permanent reserve under the Stephens Divisional Board, and areas of the current park were cleared. Remaining native vegetation suggests that the reserve was originally open eucalypt forest. However, the extent of the reserve has been reduced over time by excisions. Part of portion 155A was lost in 1888 to the South Coast railway line and a water reserve. In 1902 and 1912 some parts of 155A were given over to Villa Street, and in 1919 part of the school reserve was added to the park to form Honour Avenue, while some land was lost to a repositioning of the railway line. In 1921 part of portion 155A was reserved for showground purposes, but it was returned to the park in 1925.

In 1930 some land from portion 153A was excised for the erection of the Yeronga Fire Station (1934), and in 1931 land from 153A was added to the school reserve for the construction of a sports oval. In 1950 a part of 153A facing School Road was excised for the Yeronga Kindergarten and Pre-School, and in 1953 the remainder of 155A was removed, later being occupied by Yeronga State High School (1960) and the Yeronga Technical College (1967). In 1975 another part of 153A facing School Road was excised for a Meals on Wheels Depot, and the current park covers 22.46 hectares.

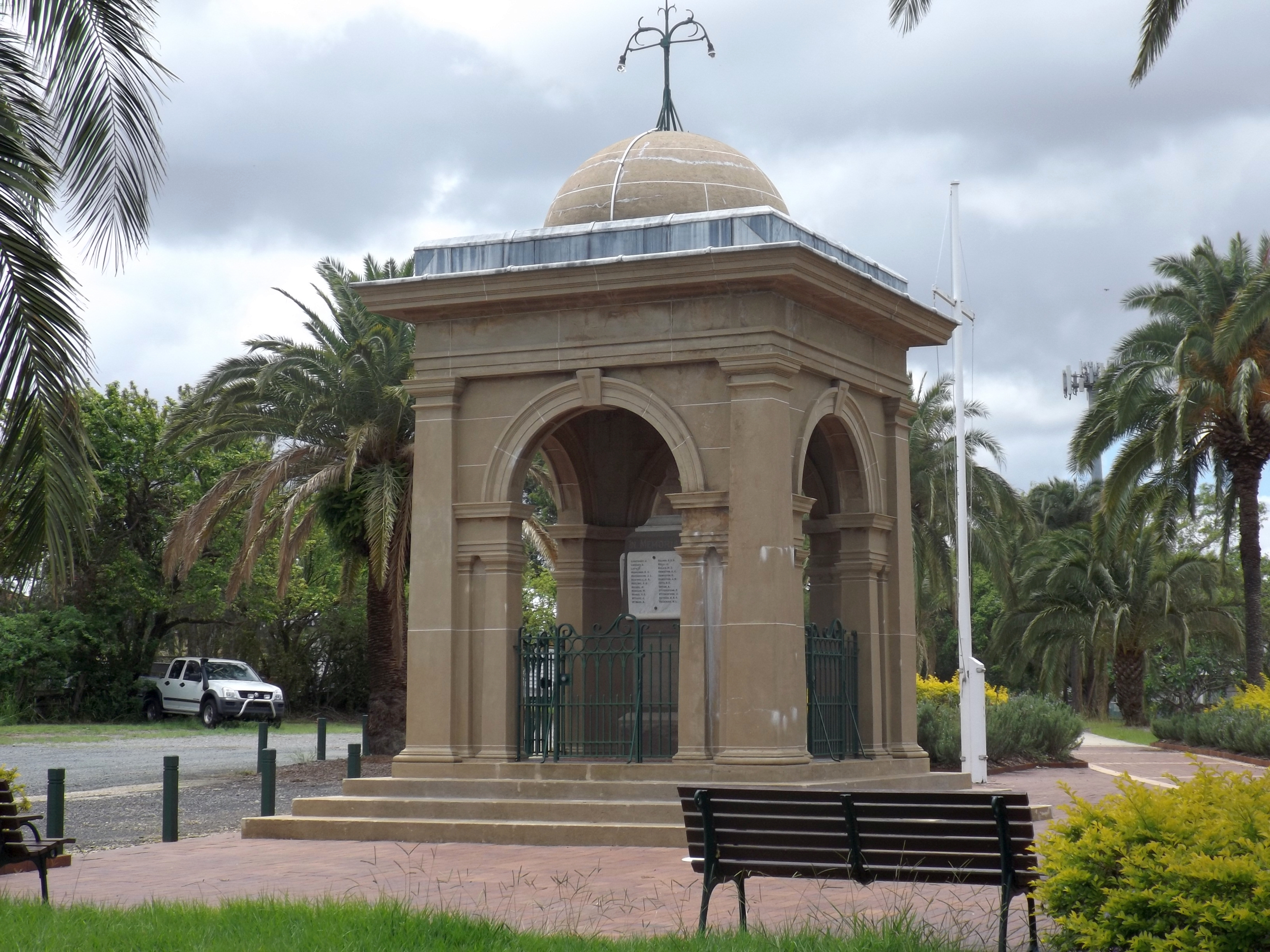
Cenotaph, 2015

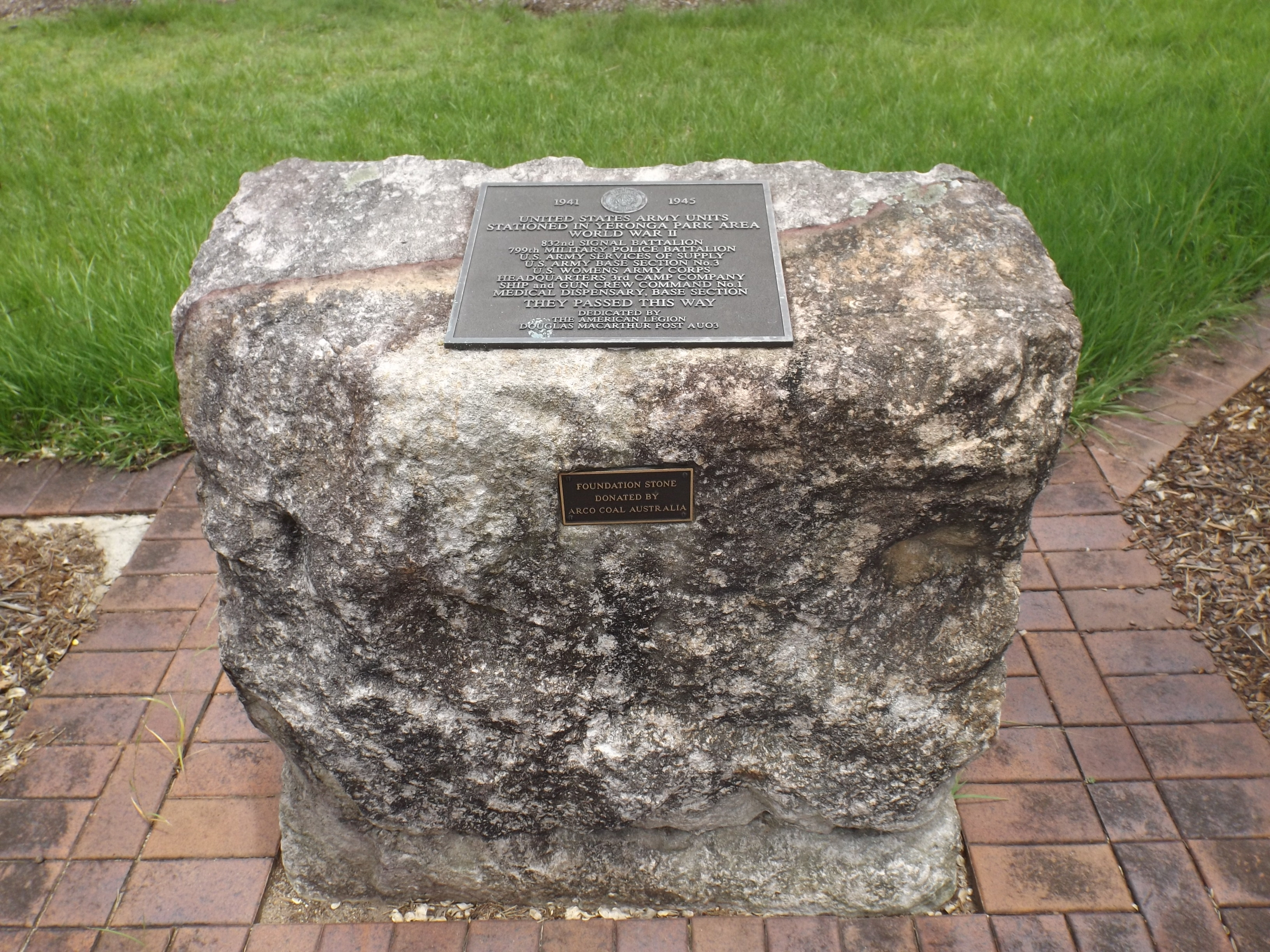
Cenotaph foundation stone, 2015

One of the most historically significant aspects of Yeronga Park is its World War I memorial role, which was developed between 1917 and 1921. Circa 1917, a road was constructed through the park, aligned east to southwest, from Park Road to Ipswich Road. Between 1917 and 1919 a total of 96 weeping figs and flame trees were planted either side of this road, forming Honour Avenue. Each tree was accompanied by a timber post topped with a metal shield which bore the name of a soldier by the Stephens Shire who had died in the war. Having a named avenue of memorial trees within a park is uncommon in Queensland. The memorial avenue is one of the earliest of its type in Australia. KS Inglis, author of "Sacred Places: War Memorials in the Australian Landscape" (1998) identifies the earliest World War I avenue of honour as being established in Victoria in 1917, which is contemporaneous with the Yeronga Park memorial avenue.

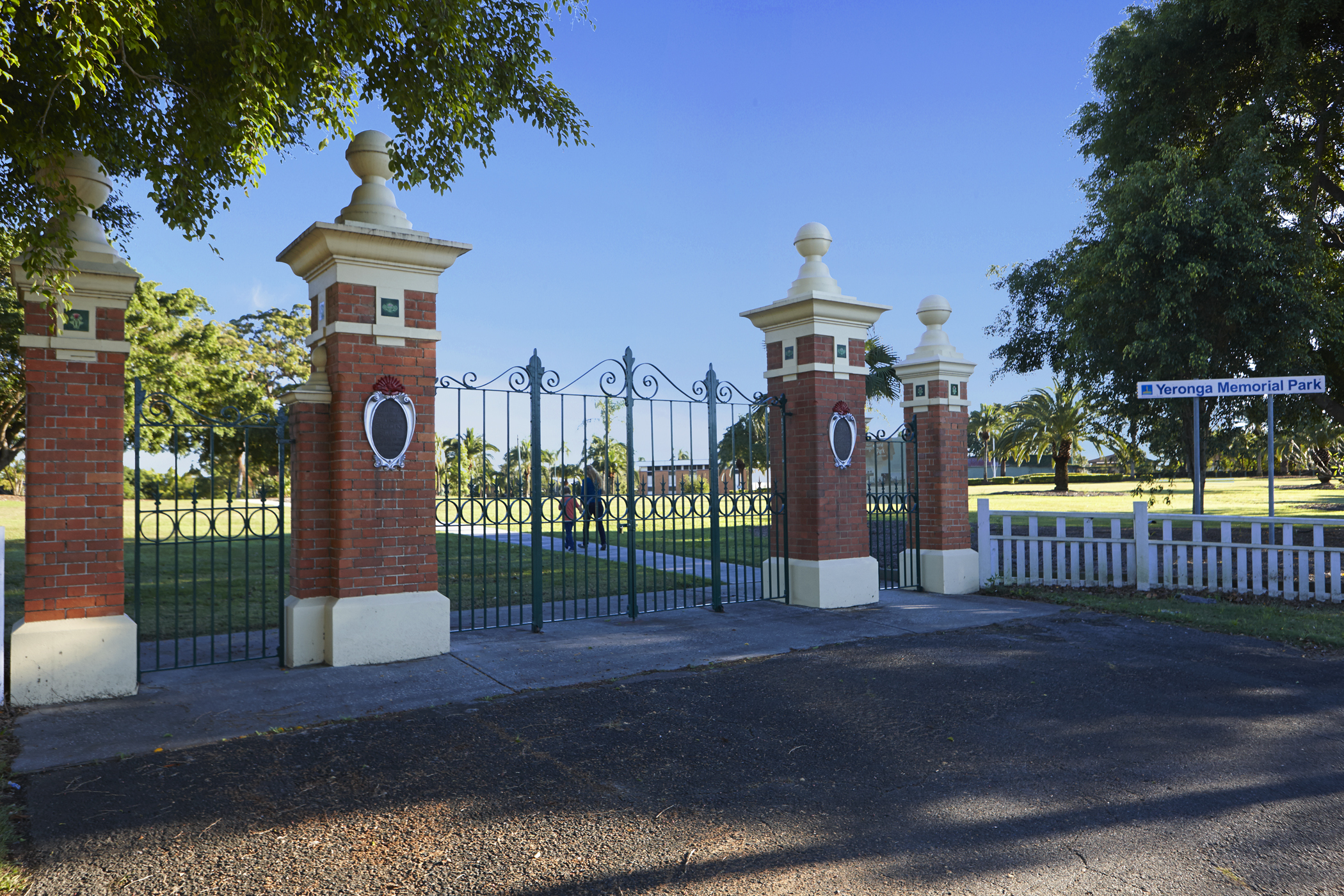
The memorial gates were built in 1921

A memorial pavilion and two sets of memorial gates to the park were built in 1921. The gates stand at each end of Honour Avenue, and although the pavilion is offset to the north-east of the avenue, it is still linked to the other memorial elements by a palm-lined footpath that runs diagonally from Honour Avenue to Ipswich Road. The domed pavilion form of war memorial is uncommon. The dedication on the southern inner pier of the Ipswich Road Gates, to the women workers of Stephens Shire, is also unusual in Queensland.

The outpouring of grief in Australia that accompanied the deaths of 60,000 servicepeople in World War I, and the fact that the dead were buried overseas, led to a period of memorial-building across the nation. Of the 559 residents of the Stephens Shire that had enlisted in World War I, the names of 97 are carved into the marble tablets fixed onto a stone in the centre of the memorial pavilion. Although the original shields set on posts by the trees have long since disappeared, they have been replaced by name plates set into concrete at the base of the trees, or on the path along Honour Avenue. Given the attrition rate on the original trees along the avenue, other trees in the park, near the Ipswich Road gates, have received plaques. The old-style plaque and post arrangement can be seen under a mango tree in front of the Country Women's Association Rooms on School Road, dedicated to Private Thomas Markey.

Following the formation of Greater Brisbane in 1925, the administration of Yeronga Park passed to the Brisbane City Council.

During World War II Yeronga Park was occupied by a number of American military units. A 1946 aerial photograph shows an extensive network of huts, which had been erected in the park to accommodate these troops. Little physical evidence of this occupation survives within the park. Part of the existing Girl Guides hall at the northern end of the park may date to this period. To the west of the memorial pavilion the American Legion has erected a memorial stone, commemorating the World War II occupation of the park by the United States' military forces.

Apart from its role as a memorial park and as "Camp Yeronga" in World War II, Yeronga Park has also been an active recreation venue for most of its history, and various clubs have leased sections of the park. The Yeronga Tennis Club was formed in 1909, and still occupies the three courts near Villa Street. Four other early courts on a terrace near the bowling club have reverted to grass. The Queensland Blind Cricket Association erected a timber hall in the north of the park in the 1920s. The Stephens Croquet Club was formed in 1923 and in that year built a wooden clubhouse and two croquet lawns in the north-east of the park. The Annerley Bowls Club operated in the park from 1927 to 1992, and its modern two-storied brick clubhouse, to the west of the croquet club, is now used by the Brisbane Bridge Centre. There is also a brick shed, which was extended in the 1950s, standing to the south of the upper bowling green. In 1936 a large in-ground draughtsboard was built to the southwest of the World War I memorial pavilion, and this was resurfaced in 2003. The Yeronga Park shale stone wall, which runs south along Ipswich Road from the memorial gates appears to have been the result of a Depression works project in the mid-1930s.

The Yeronga Park Memorial Swimming Pool Complex was built in the southwest of the park between 1960 and 1964, with an Olympic pool and two wading pools, and a heated pool was added by 1972. Designed by architects Bligh Jessup Brentnall and Partners, the pool complex is a type of war memorial that was favoured after World War II. Utilitarian structures such as swimming pools and hospitals were considered to be a more appropriate gesture of remembrance than purely monumental structures. In 1970 the Southern Districts Rugby Football Club took out a lease in the park. Their current clubhouse was built in 1986.

Non-sports organisations have also staked their claim on park land. The Kurilpa Scouts occupy the Baden Powell Memorial Hall, and the Yeronga Girl Guides occupy a building further east along Villa Street. The Yeronga Boy Scouts, who occupied the scout hall until 2003, was established in 1921. There was a smaller building present in a 1946 aerial photograph, but it was aligned parallel to Park Road. The current hall is drawn in its present position and configuration on a 1951 map. The Annerley Girl Guides was formed in 1934, and their current timber hall may be a relic of the World War II military occupation of the park, with a 1950s concrete block extension. The Queensland Country Women's Association established a headquarters on the School Road side of the park in 1952. Three organisations also built on land that was excised from the park, as mentioned earlier: the Yeronga Fire Station, the Yeronga Park Kindergarten and Preschool Association, and Meals on Wheels.

Some features of the park have disappeared over time, and these include the small huts, with white or grey mineral siding, built in World War II for the United States' military. Various older sports clubhouses have also been replaced or removed over time. There was a small clubhouse next to the tennis courts by 1946, but the current concrete block clubhouse was built between 1964 and 1972. The concrete block clubhouse of the Queensland Blind Cricket Association was built in the 1950s, with a later extension to the west. A small shed due east of this clubhouse has been removed since the 1980s. The original interwar timber two-storied Annerley Bowls Club clubhouse was replaced with the current brick two-storied clubhouse before 1972. There also appears to have been an octagonal shelter in the north-east corner of the current Rugby field, until the 1970s. This area had long been used for Sunday School picnics, which usually occurred on the Eight Hour Day holiday in May. A brick pavilion to the west of the South's Rugby Clubrooms, visible in aerial photographs from 1960 onwards, has been demolished recently. Honour Avenue has lost a number of its original trees, and the most easterly section of bitumen and kerbing, near the Ipswich Road Gates, has been removed. The most intact section of the avenue of trees lies adjacent to the central cricket oval.

In 1979 a plaque commemorating people from the area who had served in World War II, the Malayan Emergency, the Indonesia–Malaysia confrontation and the Vietnam War was added to the gates on Park Road.

== Description ==
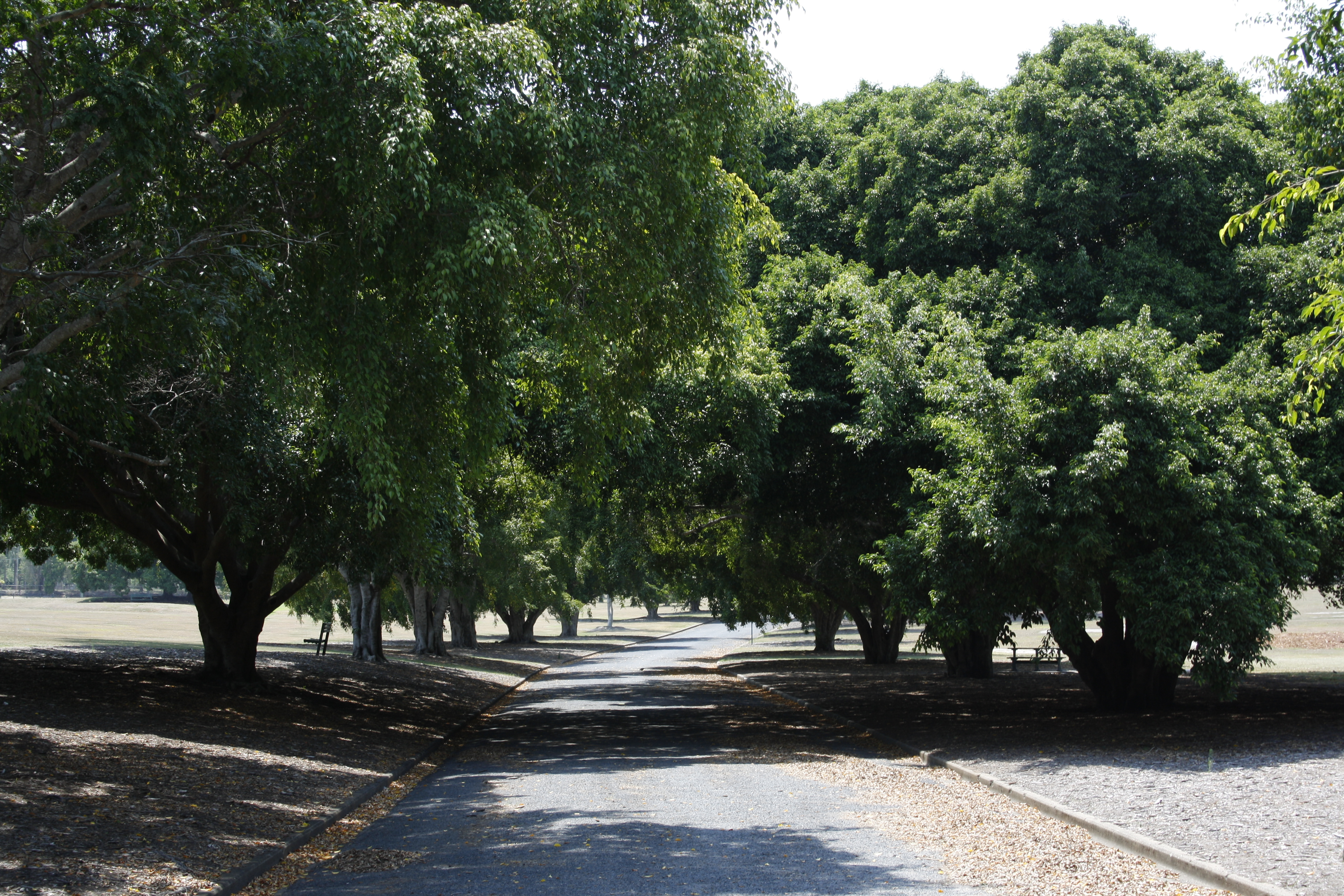
Weeping figs along Honour Avenue, 2009

Yeronga Memorial Park is bounded by Ipswich Road to the east, Villa Street to the north, Park Road to the west, and School Road to the south. A road, formerly Frederick Street, enters the park from the north, providing access to car parking for the Bridge Club and Croquet Club. Honour Avenue, which is bitumened, crosses the northern part of the park, with vehicle access from the Park Road end only. Weeping figs (Ficus benjamina) are planted symmetrically, several metres from the kerb. Honour Avenue effectively divides the park into two zones: the sports facilities established in the early twentieth century are situated to the north of Honour Avenue, and the native woodland and late twentieth century sports facilities are situated to the south of Honour Avenue.

At the western end of Honour Avenue are the memorial gates at Park Road. These consist of two pairs of red brick piers with smooth rendered corners. They stand on rough rendered plinths, and are topped by projecting cornices crowned by globes. The two inner piers support vehicle gates, and there are also iron pedestrian gates on each side of Honour Avenue. A metal plaque on the southern inner pier reads:

These gates have been erected by the residents of Yeronga and District as a permanent memorial to those men and women of the suburb who served in the Great War 1914–1919.

The plaque (1979) on the northern inner pier reads:

This plaque has been dedicated as a memorial to those men and women of the district who served in World War II 1939–1945 and Malaya, Borneo, Vietnam 1948–1973.

The Ipswich Road memorial gates, where Honour Avenue used to link with Ipswich Road, are more ornate, with the inner two piers being taller, and have smaller engaged piers facing towards the pedestrian piers. Each of the four main piers stands on a smooth rendered plinth. Low brick walls form a small enclosure on the park side of each pedestrian entrance, and there is a wooden fence leading to the gates from the footpath, north and south of the piers. On each face underneath the cornices is a decorative band of render inset with a green glazed tile displaying a floral pattern. The northern plaque reads: These gates were erected by the women of Stephens Shire in honour of the men who fought for them. The southern plaque reads: This tablet is dedicated to the women workers of Stephens Shire.

The World War I memorial pavilion stands on the southern edge of the rough-formed carpark of the ex-bowling clubhouse, near a palm-lined pedestrian path running diagonally from Honour Avenue to Ipswich Road. The square pavilion is rendered in concrete. The corner pilasters with ornamental capitals carry a thin encircling entablature, with a heavy projecting cornice above. A low parapet conceals a gutter for the domed roof. Standing on a plinth of concrete steps, each of the four arched entrances contains a decorative iron gate and fence. The pavilion shelters a square, polished stone pillar on a rough sandstone plinth. Marble tablets on each side of the stone pillar record the names of the dead from Stephens Shire, in World War I. A plaque also notes: July 1921 — Erected by the residents of Stephens Shire and District in appreciation of our boys who sacrificed their lives in the Great War 1914–1919. A small sandstone flaming urn crowns the pillar. A World War II memorial stone stands to the west of the pavilion.

To the north of Honour Avenue are a number of other significant facilities within the park. From west to east, these include: a Scout hall; three tennis courts; a Girl Guides hall; the site of old tennis courts on a grassy terrace near Frederick Street; and two unused interwar bowling greens, set at different levels. A brick shed stands to the south of the upper bowling green.

The Scout hall is low set, long and rectangular, with narrow vertical timber boards for most of the building, and weatherboards around the wider eastern section. It has a galvanised iron roof, and double- hopper windows. The Girl Guides hall has an early (possibly 1940s) weatherboard, skillion-roofed section with a later concrete block extension.

Several croquet greens and a croquet clubhouse occupy the north-east corner of the park. The weatherboard clubhouse of the Stephens Croquet Club is a small rectangular building with a gambrel roof clad with corrugated iron. It stands on concrete stumps. The roof ridge has an orbed finial at each end, above small gablets which ventilate the roof space. A small projecting pediment marks the main entrance, which faces north over the lawns. The building has early multi-paned windows.

A large in-ground draughtsboard stands between the ex- Bowling Club and Honour Avenue, and an arris rail fence runs north from the memorial gates along Ipswich Road. A shale stone retaining wall runs along Ipswich Road, forming an embankment terrace running south from the memorial gates. A cricket oval lies south-west of the rugby field, and the timber Country Women's Association (CWA) rooms face School Road on the southern edge of the park, between the old Yeronga Fire Station and the Yeronga Park Kindergarten and Preschool Association. The CWA building is a modest timber cottage, supported on low concrete stumps and sheltered by a hip roof clad with corrugated metal sheeting. Between the Swimming Pool Complex and Honour Avenue is a third cricket oval.

Located in the naturalistic bushland landscape of the southwest corner of the park, the Swimming Pool complex includes a masonry slab-on- ground, change rooms and kiosk building, one Olympic size swimming pool, two small wading pools, a 25-metre (82 ft) heated swimming pool and a small masonry swim club building. The wading pools are sheltered by shade structure and there is a scattering of poolside chairs and tables around the concourse. The pool complex is fenced and entry is from School Road. A bitumen carpark stands adjacent to Yeronga State School.

The mature trees featured around the park include the area of eucalyptus woodland near the swimming pools, and the plantings associated with the park's memorial role. These include the weeping figs planted along Honour Avenue, of which those in the centre of the park are the best examples. Other mature figs are planted along Ipswich Road and School Road. There are Canary Island date palms along the path near the memorial pavilion, and also along the northern boundary of the bowling and croquet greens. A large double-row, alternately queen palms and Chinese fan palms, curves from Ipswich Road, behind the rugby grounds, to School Road, and a line of queen palms runs across the northern boundary of the park. There are some queen palms planted along the eastern side of Frederick Street, which extends into the park, and a small double row of palms cuts from Frederick Street diagonally to Honour Avenue. Some palms also run down Park Road in front of the Scout hall. Two mango trees stand near the old tennis court terrace, there are cypress trees planted on three sides of the functioning tennis courts, and assorted specimen and memorial trees grow on the east lawn between the memorial pavilion and the Ipswich Road memorial gates. A large tallow wood eucalyptus stands near the entry to the rugby ground carpark.

Informative Note The current clubhouse of the Southern Districts Rugby Union Club, the former bowling clubhouse, the cricket pavilion, the modern tennis courts and tennis clubhouse, the Girl Guides clubhouse and the toilet block south of the Honour Avenue are not of cultural heritage significance.

== Facilities ==
The park is home to the Yeronga Park Heated Pools, has a Beach volleyball area, Swimming Club, Tennis Club as well as Lawn Bowls and Cricket fields. A Brisbane City Council 50-metre (160 ft) swimming pool complex is situated on the southern edge of the park. The Swimming Club was established in 1965.

== Heritage listing ==
Yeronga Memorial Park was listed on the Queensland Heritage Register on 2 December 2005 having satisfied the following criteria.

The place is important in demonstrating the evolution or pattern of Queensland's history.

Yeronga Memorial Park is important in demonstrating part of the pattern of Queensland's history, being a recreation reserve established in 1882, and later a memorial park from 1917. Within the layout, structures, buildings, plantings and activities pursued in the park are illustrated several important themes and events in Queensland's history. These historical layers include: sporting activities since the 1880s, including Queensland Blind Cricket, bowls and croquet since the 1920s; Boy Scouts and Girl Guides activities; a World War I and World War II memorial function; and providing a Depression-era work opportunity in the construction of the stone wall along Ipswich Road.

The place demonstrates rare, uncommon or endangered aspects of Queensland's cultural heritage.

The memorial avenue lined with trees, memorial gates, and memorial pavilion, created between 1917 and 1921, are key aspects of the park, both historically and in establishing the current layout of the park. They demonstrate the process of grieving that was occurring across Stephens Shire (1903 to 1925), Queensland and Australia at that time. After World War I, most Queensland communities erected a public memorial to honour local participation in the war, and each monument is a unique historical documentary record. The honour avenue is one of the earliest World War I memorial avenues established in Australia. The domed memorial pavilion is an uncommon form of war memorial in Queensland. The dedication on the Ipswich Road memorial gates, to the women workers of Stephens Shire, is an unusual public recognition of women's role in World War I.

The place is important in demonstrating the principal characteristics of a particular class of cultural places.

Yeronga Memorial Park is important in demonstrating the principal characteristics of its type: a public park since 1882 and a war memorial since 1917. Much of the 1917 layout of the park survives. Elements within the park that are important in demonstrating the use of the park for these purposes include: the tennis courts and surrounding cypress trees; the croquet clubroom and lawn (1923); a pedestrian path lined by palms (pre-1946); the bowls club lawns (1927); the in-ground draughtsboard (1936); the memorial pavilion (1921); the World War II memorial stone north of Honour Avenue which is formed by a memorial avenue of trees (1917–1919); the memorial gates (1921). To the south of Honour Avenue, lies the CWA hall (1952), the Memorial Swimming Pool Complex (1960–1964); the shale stone retaining wall along Ipswich Road (1930s); a curved palm avenue (pre-1946) and indigenous vegetation (primarily eucalypts).

Individual features of the park are also good examples of their type, such as the timber Croquet clubroom and lawn, the bowling greens, the memorial gates, the memorial pavilion, and the Memorial Swimming Pool Complex.

The place is important because of its aesthetic significance.

Yeronga Memorial Park is significant for its aesthetic values. Contributing to this value are the substantial and imposing memorial gates at both entrances that provide a fitting and dignified entrance to Honour Avenue and the memorial pavilion. The shale stone wall, running south from the Ipswich Road gates towards the former Yeronga Fire Station, is a picturesque feature. The abundance of trees in the park, interspersed with open sporting areas, provide for pleasing vistas within the park, especially between the croquet club and the tennis courts, and across the central cricket oval. The croquet clubroom and the brick structure near the upper bowling green, also contribute to its aesthetic quality. The park also contributes to the streetscape along Ipswich Road at Yeronga/Annerley.

The mature trees that enhance the picturesque aspect of the park include: the surviving memorial fig trees along Honour Avenue; those planted in the eastern memorial lawn; the memorial palms in numerous locations within the park; the cypress trees around the tennis courts; the mango trees near the old tennis court site; the fig trees along Ipswich Road and School Road; and the eucalyptus woodland near the swimming pools.

The place has a strong or special association with a particular community or cultural group for social, cultural or spiritual reasons.

Given the role of the park as a memorial to the war dead of the Stephens Shire, its long history of use by sporting groups, and its presence as a landmark on Ipswich Road, Yeronga Park has a strong and ongoing association with the local community and is of social significance.

== See also ==
- List of parks in Brisbane
