= A. E. Bickmore =

Baptist minister in Australia

Arthur Ernest Bickmore (1886–1956) was a Baptist minister in Queensland, Australia.

== History ==
Bickmore was the fifth son of Isaac James Bickmore (died 18 July 1898) and his wife Eliza Bickmore (died 28 November 1936) of New Farm, Queensland, who arrived in the colony aboard Light Brigade in 1869.

He was accepted as a student pastor by the Baptist Home Mission in 1907 and sent to Fairfield. He conducted his first devotional meeting at the Jireh church later that same year and was subsequently attached to the Fairfield church and its Sunday school. He was stationed at Mount Morgan 1910 to 1914

In 1923 he was elected president of the Baptist Assembly.

He was an active member of the Queensland Council of Churches, convinced of the value of a single church voice when arguing to the government against easing restrictions on alcohol and gambling. In 1929 he was elected president of the Council.

He also held responsible positions within the church:

- President, Baptist Union of Queensland 1924
- General Treasurer of the Queensland Baptist Union 1927–1946
- Baptist temperance, morals, and public questions committee convenor. In this capacity, Bickmore argued strongly against government support for the Golden Casket – an "evil, insidious influence" that was "penetrating the whole community". "The Government should find a more elevating method of helping charity" he said. He also argued against
- radio quiz programs that offered exorbitant prizes
- art unions, raffles and chocolate wheels

He held that liquor should not be drunk at weddings. This could be "the first step to ruin" and was counter to the ideal of the "sacredness of marriage". Immorality was rife, he said, and "parents should supervise closely their children's reading, radio listening, and film going, and watch the company they keep". He also protested against Sunday sport.

== Family ==
Bickmore married Ethel Hooker of Teneriffe, Queensland at Jireh church on 15 June 1910. Ethel was a granddaughter of (Baptist) Rev. Ebenezer Hooker (died 27 June 1911). No record of offspring has been found.

His siblings included

- Edward James Bickmore was a teacher
- George Hiron Bickmore, second son of I. J. Bickmore, married Mary "May" Higgins on 21 April 1909
