= Yeronga =

- Suburb
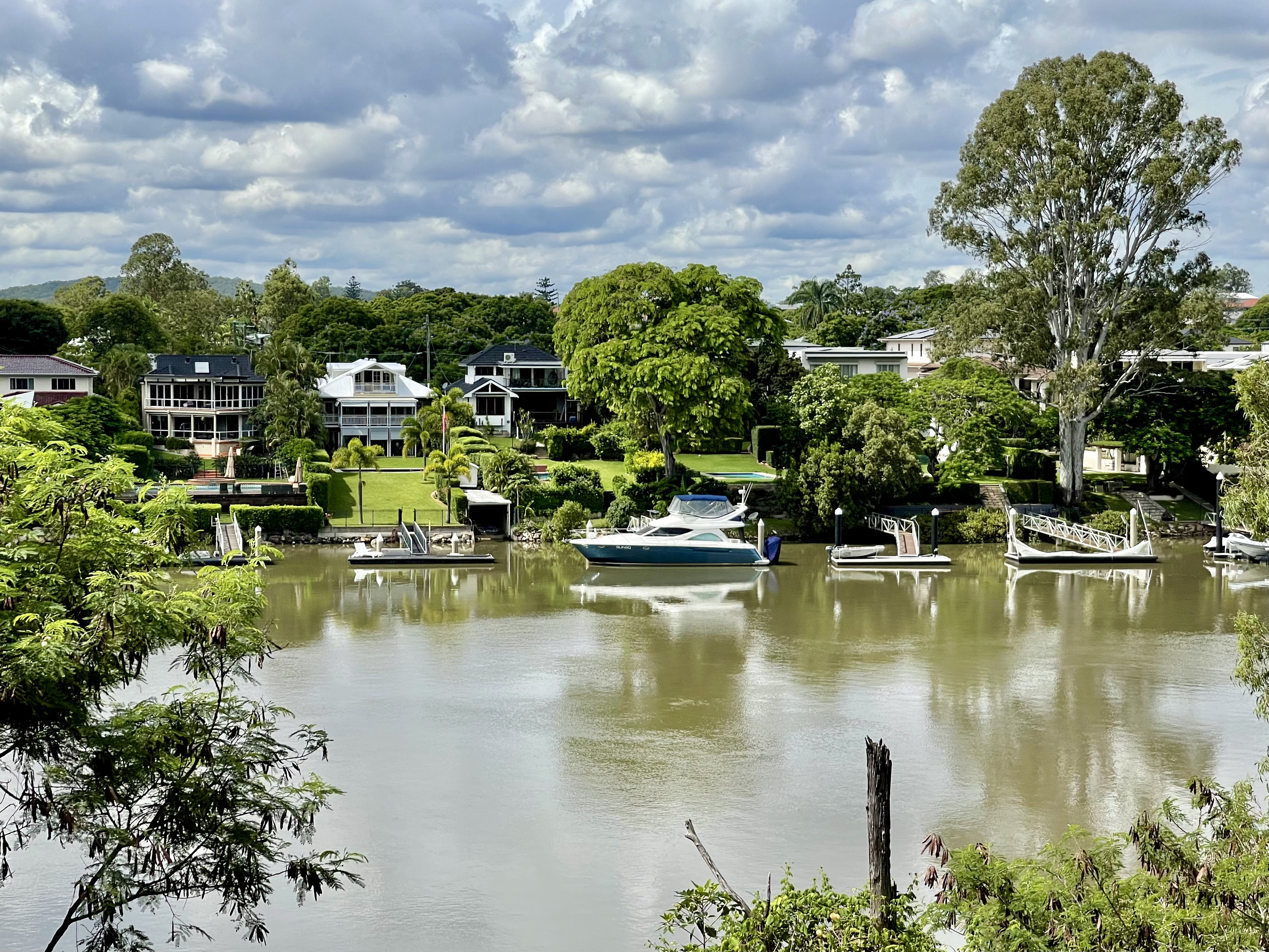
- Looking across the Brisbane River towards Yeronga

- Interactive map of Yeronga
- Coordinates: 27.5136°S 153.015°E
- Country: Australia
- State: Queensland
- City: Brisbane
- LGA: City of Brisbane (Tennyson Ward)
- Location: 8.3 km (5.2 mi) S of Brisbane CBD

Government
  - State electorate: Miller
  - Federal division: Moreton

Area
  - Total: 3.5 km^{2} (1.4 sq mi)

Population
  - Total: 7,062 (2021 census)
  - Density: 2,018/km^{2} (5,230/sq mi)
- Time zone: UTC+10:00 (AEST)
- Postcode: 4104
Suburbs around Yeronga
St Lucia	St Lucia	Fairfield
Indooroopilly	Yeronga	Annerley
Indooroopilly	Yeerongpilly	Annerley

Yeronga is a southern riverside suburb in the City of Brisbane, Queensland, Australia. In the 2021 census, Yeronga had a population of 7,062 people.

== Geography ==
The suburb is bounded to the west and north by the Brisbane River and to the south-east by Ipswich Road.

A total of 16 streets in the Yeronga West area begin with the letter O, including Orvieto Road, Orsova Road and Oriana Crescent, locally known as the 'O zone'. Many of these streets appear to be named after ships and passenger liners owned by the Orient Line, which became part of P&O. They include Orient, Orsova, Ormuz and Orcades. Some names were used for two or more ships over time. For example, the first RMS Orama was launched in 1911 and sunk by a torpedo in 1917, and the second RMS Orama was launched in 1924 and sunk in the Norwegian campaign in 1940.

Four streets in Yeronga (including two forming a circuit) appear to have been named after prominent architects, being Dalton St, Grounds St, Seidler St and Utzon St.

There were a series of lagoons adjacent to the river, and these were initially used as rubbish tips for the expanding area. Once the lagoons were filled, they were topped with clay and became parks. This explains the relatively large area of parkland, sports fields and open space adjacent to the river in Yeronga today.

== History ==
The name Yeronga is thought to be either derived from the Aboriginal words yarung (meaning sandy or gravelly) and ba (meaning place), or that it derives from the name of the house Yerong-lea, the residence of Charles Hardie Buzacott.

The first inhabitants of the Yeronga area were the Jagera people, whose traditional country is the south side of the Brisbane River.

In 1823 the first Europeans passed through the Brisbane region, being the former convicts, then timber getters, Thomas Pamphlett, John Finnigan and Richard Parsons. Their journey around the Moreton Bay area following being blown off course by a cyclone is an epic story in itself. Suffice to say that in their attempt to walk north along the coastline to Sydney (they thought the cyclone had pushed their boat south of Sydney) they followed the south bank of the Brisbane River (around May 1823) upstream through Yeronga to Oxley Creek (originally named Canoe Creek), where they found a bark canoe and used it to travel further north. The present Pamphlett Bridge at that spot honours the member of the party who could swim, as the canoe was on the west bank of the creek.

The explorer John Oxley sailed into Moreton Bay in November 1823 but didn't see the entrance to the Brisbane River due to the extensive mangrove forest there at the time. He then sailed north and encountered Pamphlett and Finnegan around Bribie Island (Parsons had continued north to the Noosa area). Finnegan then guided Oxley to the entrance of the river, where he sailed upstream as far as Goodna. Thus whilst Oxley is traditionally credited with the discovery of the Brisbane River (and Canoe Creek was renamed in his honour), but for his encounter with Pamphlett and Finnegan he may never have known it was there.

Following the establishment of the Moreton Bay Penal Colony at the site of what is now the Brisbane central business district in 1825, and the opening up of the area to free settlers in 1842, European settlement spread from that site.

The first recorded land sale at Yeronga occurred in 1854, with 154 acres (~62 hectares) being purchased by Edward Cooke and TLM Prior. Being part of NSW at that stage, the contract was sent to Sydney and has not been located. After Queensland became a separate colony in 1859, a second land sale of 100 acres (~40ha) occurred in 1861. When local government was established, Yeronga became part of the Shire of Stephens. This and other councils amalgamated to form the Brisbane City Council in 1925.

Yeronga was originally used for agricultural purposes, and dairy farms were established, especially on the fertile riverside and adjacent floodplains. Crops recorded as grown in the area were cotton, sugar, maize, potatoes and arrowroot. Urban residential settlement first occurred along Fairfield Road, and especially around Station Avenue (now Kadumba St) once the railway opened in 1884.

A small coal mine was established near Newcastle Street but appears to have been quickly mined out.

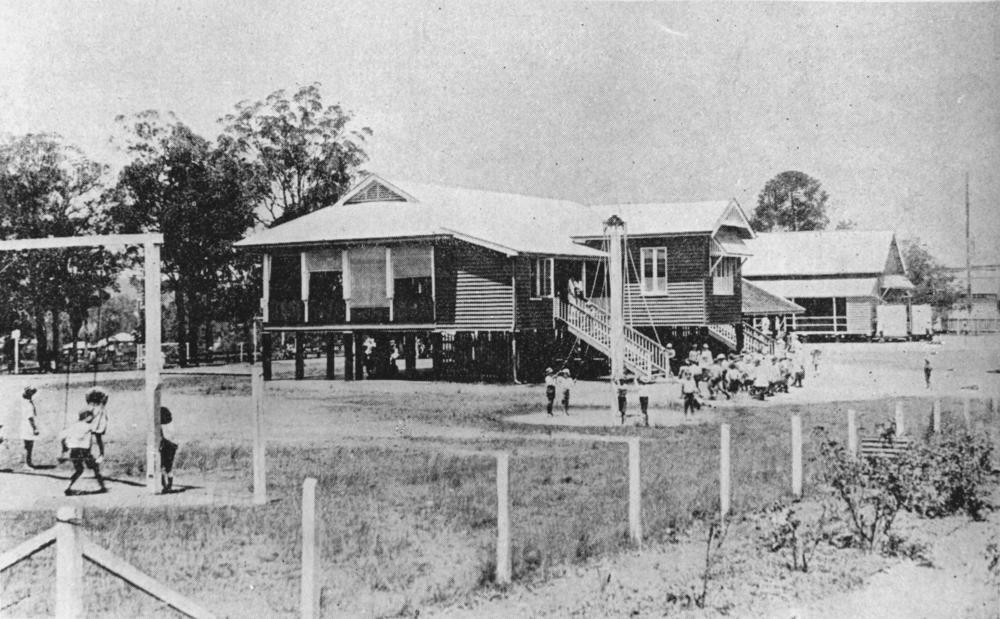
In the playground at Yeronga State School, 1923

Boggo National School opened in January 1867 or on 6 February 1871. In 1886, it was renamed Yeronga State School.

In July 1884, 180 subdivided allotments of "Yeronga Estate", were auctioned by Simon Fraser & Son Auctioneers. A map advertising the sale shows the estate to be adjoining the Yeronga railway station.

In 1917, 30 subdivided allotments of "Avoca Estate" were auctioned by Webb & Webb Auctioneers. A map advertising the auction shows the estate is close to Yeronga railway station.

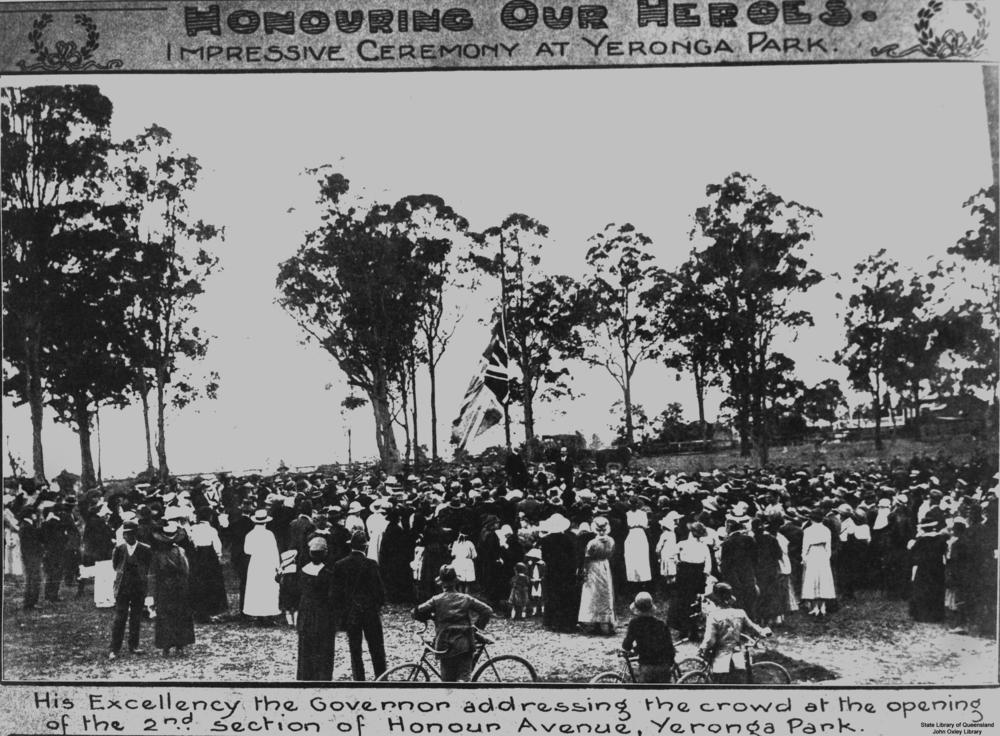
Honouring our heroes at Yeronga Park, published in The Queenslander, 27 July 1918

In November 1920, 17 business and residential subdivided allotments of "Gilbert Estate, Yeronga", were auctioned by A. M. Newman, Associate Auctioneer. The auctioneer was acting under the instructions from trustees of the late Eli Gilbert. A map advertising the auction shows the estate adjoins the Yeronga Railway Station.

In May 1923, 85 subdivided allotments of "River Park and Grimes Estate" were advertised to be auctioned by Cameron Bros. Auctioneers.

In 1923 the Stephens Croquet Club was established in the Yeronga Memorial Park consisting of two lawns and a clubhouse.

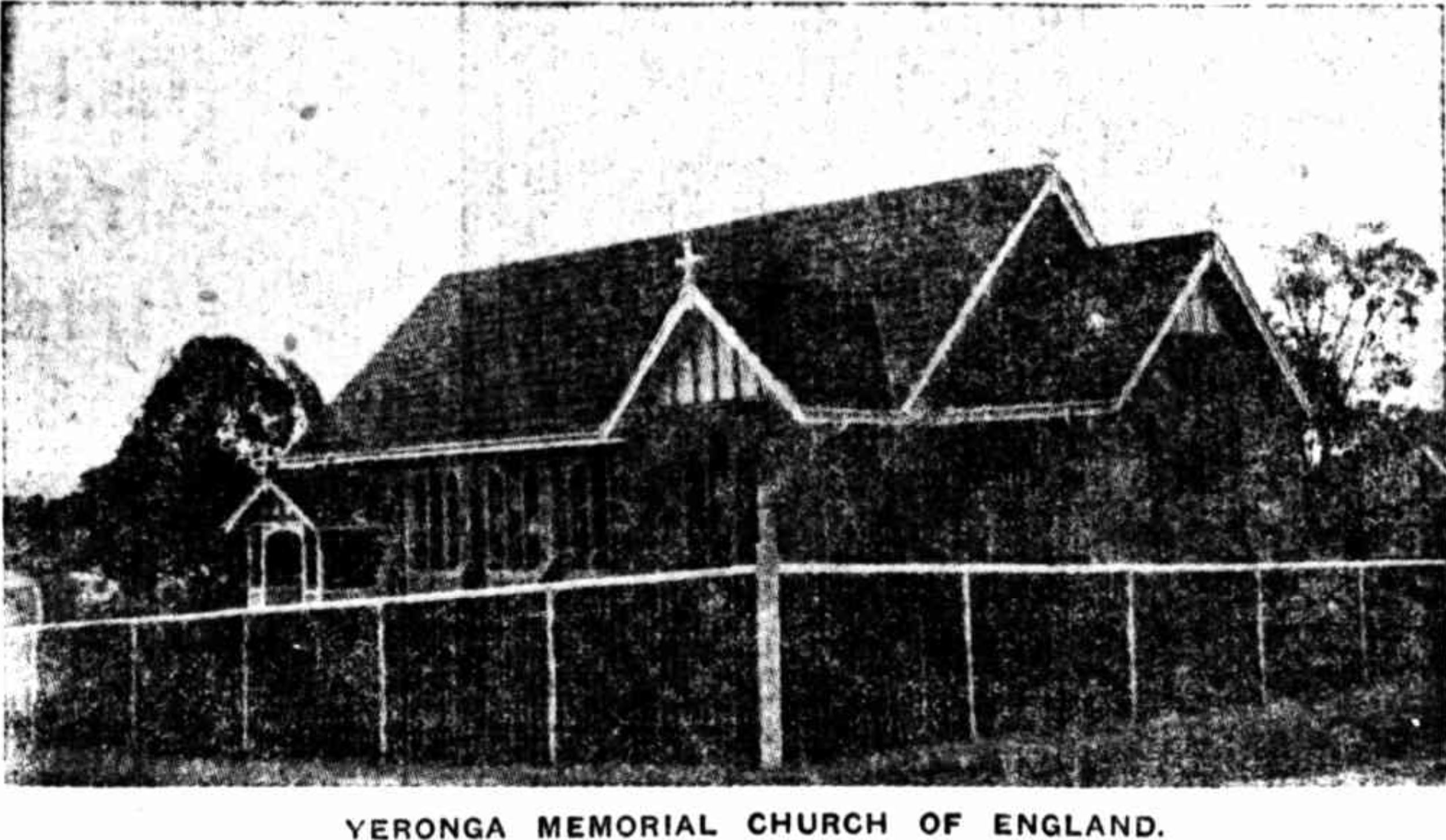
Yeronga Memorial Church of England (now Christ Church Anglican) at opening, 1923

On Sunday 6 May 1923, the Yeronga Memorial Church of England (now Christ Church Anglican) was opened and dedicated by Archbishop Gerald Sharp. The church was erected to commemorate 15 Church of England men from Yeronga who died in World War I; a marble slab in the church lists their names.

In August 1927, 9 subdivided allotments of "St. Olaves Estate, Yeronga", were auctioned by Isles, Love & Co. Limited Auctioneers. A map advertising the auction states that it is only a few minutes from the Yeronga railway station.

St Joseph's Catholic Primary School (combined with a church) opened for enrolments on 25 January 1937 having 38 pupils by 27 January 1937. It was officially opened on Sunday 7 February 1937 by Archbishop James Duhig. It was operated by the Sisters of St Joseph of the Sacred Heart with Sister Pancratius and Sister Catherine the founding teachers. It was subsequently renamed St Sebastian's Catholic Primary School.

Yeronga Infants State School was separated from Yeronga State School on 29 September 1941. It closed in 1979 when it was absorbed back into Yeronga State School.

The last farm in Yeronga was subdivided for residential use in the mid-1950s, and part of the north side of Hyde Rd became a light industrial area with the opening of the Taubmans (later Akzo Nobel) paint factory in 1952. A Sunbeam electrical appliances factory was later established on the corner of Hyde Rd and Cansdale St, and a warehouse and timber yard west of the paint factory. All have now closed, and the area is subject to a planning study to determine future (likely residential) redevelopment plans.

The Anglican Church of the Good Shepherd was dedicated on 26 October 1958 by Coadjutor Bishop Horace Henry Dixon. It was closed on 10 May 1992 by Archbishop Peter Hollingworth. The church building was subsequently moved to Rainbow Beach where it retains the name of the Anglican Church of the Good Shepherd.

Yeronga State High School opened on 25 January 1960, originally proposed to be called Annerley State High School. At this time, the suburb was sufficiently developed that it was hard to find a large enough site, so the 60-acre (24 ha) site obtained was challenging terrain to build on, being hilly, rocky, with heavy clay, with a large drainage gully. It opened with a principal, 12 staff and 217 students. In 1966–1967, the school lost part of its site to accommodate the construction of Yeronga TAFE College, although there were some shared facilities developed. With the closure of the TAFE College in 2012, some of its land and buildings were given back to the school.

=== Flooding ===
Parts of Yeronga were inundated during Brisbane's 2011 floods.

The major flood events of the Brisbane River in 1887, 1890, 1893, 1907 and 1931 are not recorded as causing significant damage to Yeronga (the flood-prone areas of which were not extensively developed at those times), but the 1974 and 2011 floods caused extensive damage to many of the properties adjacent to the river and built in low-lying parts of the suburb. At the peak of these floods Hyde Road was blocked and Kadumba Street (which is built on a ridgeline) was the only major access to the western part of the suburb.

== Demographics ==
In the 2011 census, the population of Yeronga was 5,540, 51.1% female and 48.9% male. The median age of the Yeronga population was 34 years, 3 years below the Australian median. 72.4% of people living in Yeronga were born in Australia, compared to the national average of 69.8%; the next most common countries of birth were England 3.2%, New Zealand 2.8%, India 1.3%, Philippines 0.8%, China 0.8%. 81.5% of people spoke only English at home; the next most common languages were 1.3% Greek, 1.1% Mandarin, 0.8% Arabic, 0.7% Vietnamese, 0.6% Spanish.

In the 2016 census, Yeronga had a population of 6,535 people.

In the 2021 census, Yeronga had a population of 7,062 people.

== Heritage listings ==
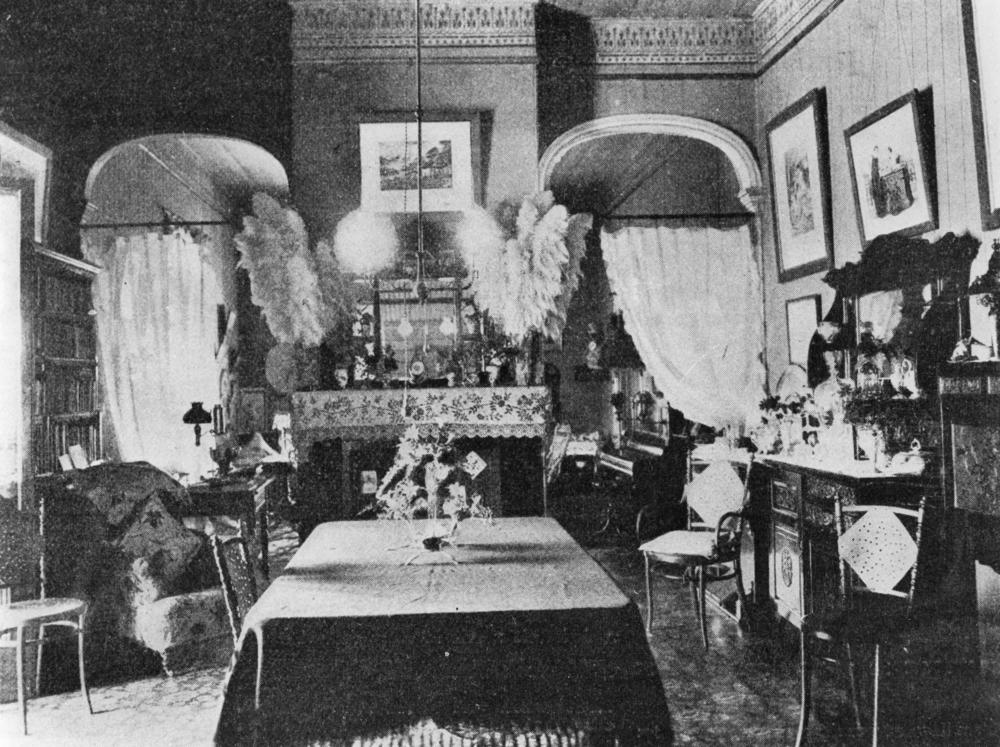
1907 view of Mr. Denny Day's drawing room at Yeronga, lit with the twentieth century light (Description supplied with photograph)

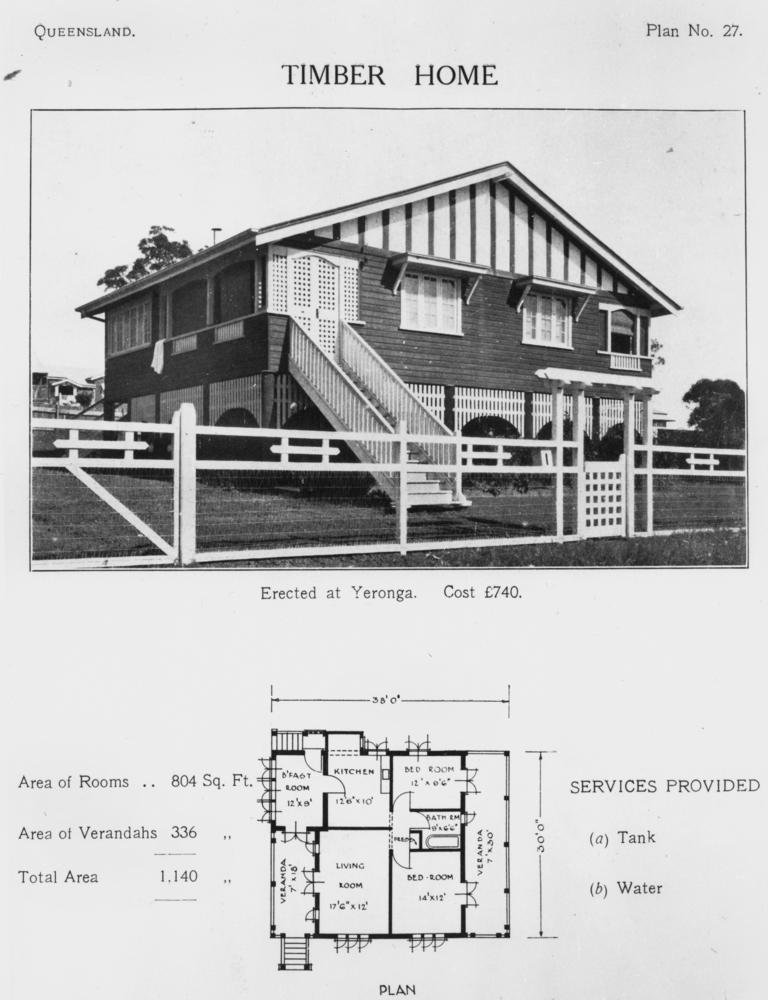
Timber home at Yeronga ~1925

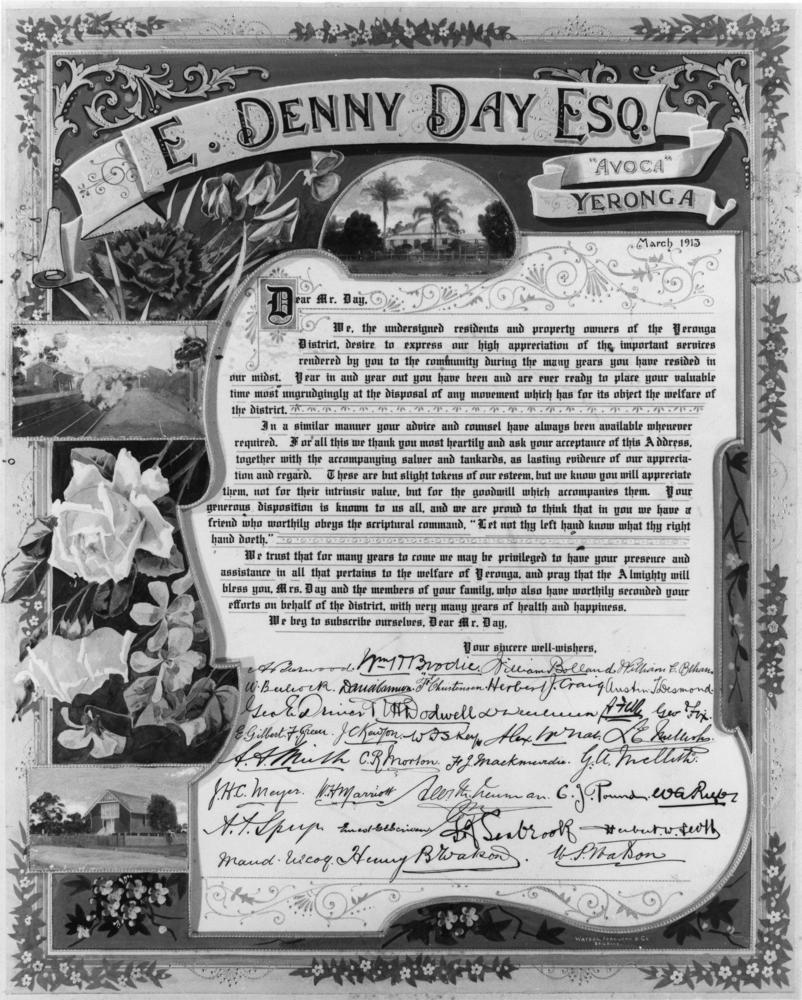
Illustrated address presented to E. Denny Day, Esq., of Avoca at Yeronga, 1913. The address was presented by the residents and property owners of the Yeronga District expressing appreciation for services rendered by E. Denny Day (General Manager of the Royal Bank of Queensland) to the community of Yeronga. The address depicts Mr Day's home, Avoca, which was located a few hundred yards from the Yeronga Railway Station (Description supplied with photograph)

Yeronga has a number of heritage-listed sites, including:

- 25 Belfast Street: Wyetah (house)
- 12 Cork Street: Christ Church, Church Hall & Rectory (also known as Christ Church Yeronga)
- 5 Dublin Street: Victorian-era house
- 6 Dublin Street: Knowle (house)
- 27 Dublin Street: Shottesbrooke (house)
- 36 Feez Street: Avoca (house)
- Ipswich Road: Yeronga Memorial Park
- 785 Ipswich Road: former Yeronga Fire Station

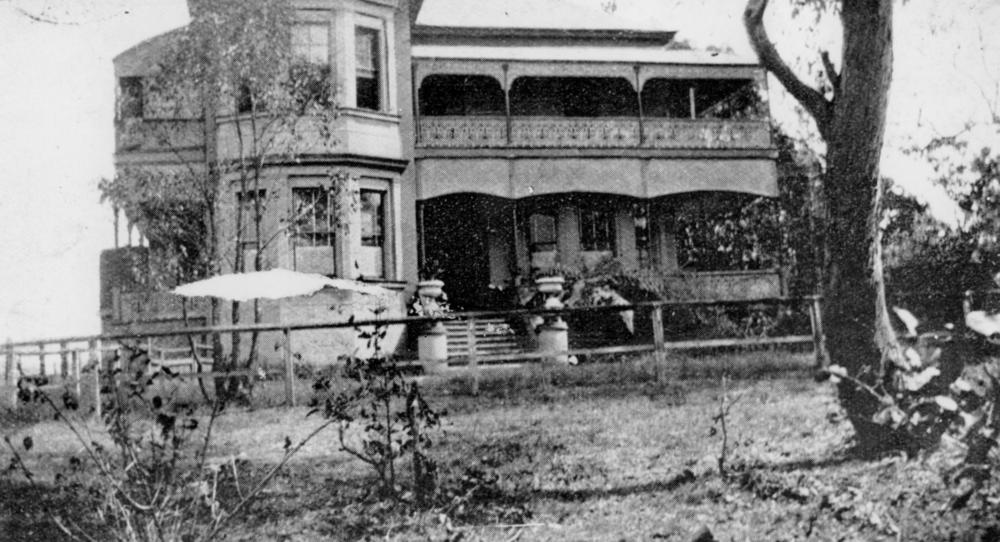
Front of the Yeronga residence, Rhyndarra ca. 1931. This home was built for W. W. Williams in 1888 then used by the Salvation Army from 1897 (from The Queenslander, 12 November 1931, p.27)

- 23 Riverview Place: Rhyndarra (house)
- 88 Kadumba Street: Como (villa, later known as Barrogill)
- 96 Kadumba Street: Astolat (villa)
- 107 Kadumba Street: John Mills' residence
- 141 Kadumba Street: former St Sebastian's Church School
- 10 Killarney Street: Killarney (house, also known as Cranston)
- 22 Killarney Street: Rollwagen residence
- 21A Park Road (27.5177°S 153.0170°E): Yeronga Railway Station footbridge
- 71 Park Road: former H. Bayard residence
- 78 Park Road: Yeronga Memorial Park
- 122–150 Park Road: Yeronga State School (also known as Boggo Primary School)
- 57 Rome Street North: Federation-era house
- 156 School Road: former Yeronga Congregational Church and Hall
- 171 School Road: Yeronga Bowls Club

== Education ==
Yeronga State School is a government primary (Early Childhood to Year 6) school for boys and girls at 122 Park Road (27.5189°S 153.0197°E). In 2018, the school had an enrolment of 686 students with 58 teachers (47 full-time equivalent) and 49 non-teaching staff (25 full-time equivalent).

St Sebastian's Primary School is a Catholic primary (Prep–6) school for boys and girls at 141 Kadumba Street (27.5139°S 153.0104°E). In 2018, the school had an enrolment of 200 students with 18 teachers (14 full-time equivalent) and 12 non-teaching staff (4 full-time equivalent).

Yeronga State High School is a government secondary (7–12) school for boys and girls at 159 Villa Street (27.5174°S 153.0225°E). In 2018, the school had an enrolment of 760 students with 79 teachers (74 full-time equivalent) and 60 non-teaching staff (43 full-time equivalent). It includes a special education program and an intensive English language program .

== Facilities ==
Despite its name, the Fairfield Wastewater Treatment Plant is in Yeronga on the south-west corner of the Brisbane Corso and Cansdale Street (27.5070°S 153.0141°E). The treated wastewater is released into the nearby Brisbane River.

== Amenities ==
The main commercial area is located on Fairfield Road, opposite the railway station, which is effectively the centre of the suburb. It provides services including a post office, fruit and vegetable store, butcher, bakeries, cafe, liquor shops, medical rooms, bicycle shop, pharmacy, dentist, newsagent, hair dresser, fashion shops, restaurants, real estate agent and fuel/convenience stores. There is also a neighbourhood shopping strip on Hyde Road with a cafe, restaurant, gourmet pizza, beauty saloon and hair dresser. Yeronga's many coffee shops are popular during the weekdays and weekends.

The Annerley-Yeronga branch of the Queensland Country Women's Association meets at the Annerley Yeronga Hall at 9 School Road.

Christ Church Anglican (also known as Yeronga Anglican Church) is at 2-10A Cork Street (between Killarney Street and Dublin Street, 27.5179°S 153.0189°E).

== Sport ==
The Stephens Croquet Club operates in Yeronga Memorial Park (27.5190°S 153.0276°E).

Souths Rugby play in the Queensland Premier competition at Chipsy Wood Oval. Olympic FC play at Goodwin Park in the Brisbane Premier League. The Yeronga Devils Australian Football team is based at Leyshon Park, which is also the headquarters of the AFL Queensland, the governing body for the sport in the state.

== Transport ==
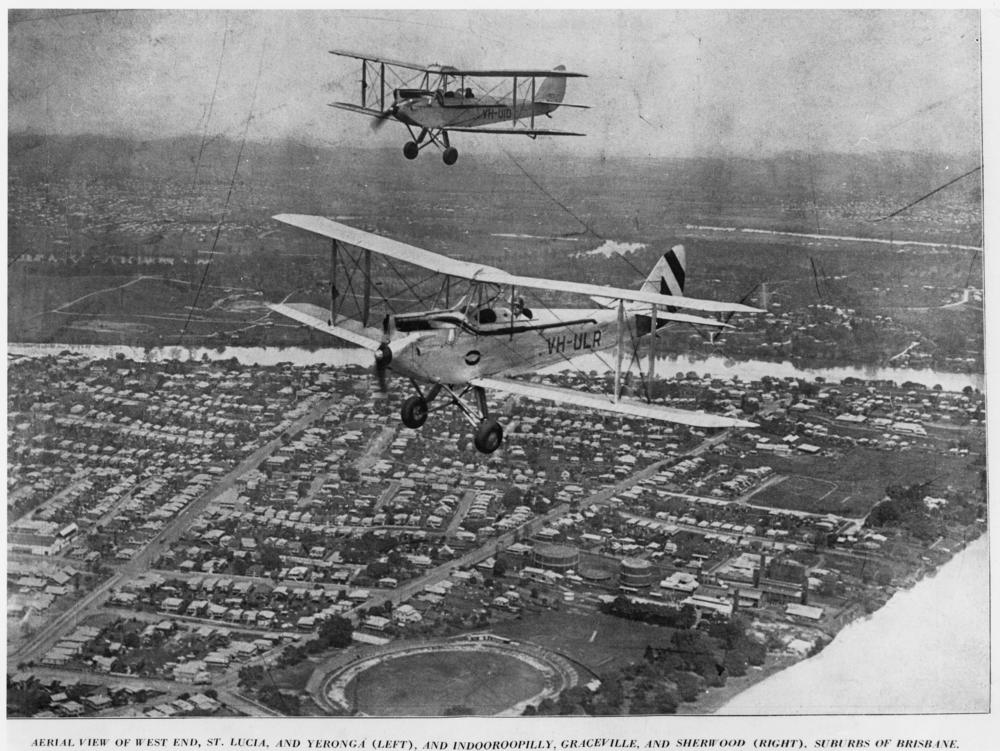
Gypsy Moths over West End, Davies Park oval below, Yeronga is to the left of the top wing of the front aircraft, 1933

Yeronga railway station on the Beenleigh line provides access (travelling south) to Beenleigh (and with a change of train, the Gold Coast) and (travelling north) Ferny Grove via the Brisbane central business district.

The opening of the railway from Corinda to the South Brisbane river wharves in June 1884 gave Yeronga improved access to the city (via the Victoria Bridge) and surrounding areas. The extension of the line to South Brisbane in 1891, and the connecting tram service, further improved access to the city. The opening of the Merivale Bridge in 1978 enabled trains to connect to Roma Street, Central and other city stations, though many people travelling to the south end of the City still detrain at South Bank station and walk over the Goodwill Bridge (pedestrian & bicycle only), or at South Brisbane station to walk or catch a bus over the Victoria Bridge. The railway through Yeronga was electrified in 1984, at which time a 30-minute service frequency was introduced. This increased to 15-minute frequency on 20 January 2014.

There are also three bus services that travel through the suburb providing direct links to the city, University of Queensland and Indooroopilly.

Upon its creation the Brisbane City Council (BCC) became responsible for tram, and then bus public transport in its area. One of the first BCC bus routes was provided to Yeronga in 1940, known then as Route 7. This service to the City continues to be provided, known today as the Route 107. The Route 127 bus now provides an additional service between Fairfield and Indooroopilly, while the Route 192 provides a service from Yeerongpilly to the City via the UQ Lakes Bus Station.

== Notable people ==
- Charles Hardie Buzacott (1835–1918), who also held the position of Queensland Post Master General, owned Yerong-lea.
- Thomas Joseph Byrnes (1860–1898), Premier of Queensland from April 1898 until his death from pneumonia 5 months later in September that year, purchased Yerong-lea from Charles Buzacott
- Thomas Lodge Murray-Prior, at one stage Post Master General (i.e. head of the Queensland Post Office) and the initial joint owner of the first land sold in Yeronga
- Lloyd Rees (1895–1988), artist. He was born at his family home in the suburb. His memoirs include recollections of playing on the banks of the Brisbane River as a young boy.
