= Queensland Council of Churches =

The Queensland Council of Churches was a body of leaders from the evangelical Christian churches of the Australian colony or state of Queensland. It was formed to present a unified front to influence public discourse and government policy, and also served to increase communication and cooperation between rival churches with similar aims and philosophies. This article traces the history of the council through a list of its presidents and, to a lesser extent, its secretaries, who through being eligible for reelection, provided stability and continuity.

== History ==
The Council of Churches in Queensland was founded in 1896. with W. Whale as president and H. Youngman as secretary. The official title of the organisation appears to have been simply "Council of Churches", but "Queensland Council of Churches" or "Council of Churches in Queensland" have both appeared in print, sometimes in the same article. Common issues addressed were gambling and playing sport on Sunday, though to many workers, Sunday was the only day available for relaxation — in 1905 the Council was much aggrieved at discount railway fares being offered on Sunday, encouraging desecration of the Sabbath by pleasure-seekers.

Persons elected president include:

- 1896 William Whale (Baptist)
- 1897 Walter Tatham
- 1898 Charles Stead (died 1916)
- 1899 Peter Robertson (Presbyterian)
- 1900 John W. Roberts (Congregational) left for Hobart and was succeeded by Peter Thomson.
- 1901 George Grimes
- 1902 Robert Stewart
- 1903 Thomas Nisbet
- 1904 A. J. Griffith (Congregational)
- 1905 D. Henry Youngman (Methodist)
- 1906, 1907 George M. Rice

One of the last campaigns of the Brisbane Council of Churches was to complain about Sunday funerals. There was no announcement; the Council just ceased to exist. Rice returned to Britain in 1908.

=== Brisbane Church Federation ===
Brisbane Church Federation was founded in 1913 It became the Queensland Council of Churches in 1925.

- 1914 Henry Youngman
- 1916 W. J. Tunley, later served as secretary
- 1917, 1918 Henry Youngman
- 1920 T. E. White
- 1921 Merrington
- 1922 W. G. Pope
- 1923 Charles Alfred White
- 1924 B. Hewison, C. A. White
- 1925 W. G. Pope, W. H. Harrison

=== Council of Churches ===
In 1925 a Council of Churches in Brisbane was established based on the Melbourne model, and officers elected.

- 1926 W. H. Green
- 1927 Hume Robertson (died 1921)

Thomas Bibby (died 1948) secretary.

- 1928, 1929 Arthur Ernest Bickmore
- 1930 Charles Young (Church of Christ)
- 1931, 1932 G(eorge) McChesney Clark (died 1932) He became a minor celebrity as (inadvertently) the first member of the public to cross the Sydney Harbour Bridge by train.
- 1933, 1934 Norman Stuart Millar (Presbyterian, died Oct 1938)
- 1935–1940 Rev. Harold M. Wheller also 1945
- 1947 Albert Butler died in 1947 and was succeeded by J. F. T. Short

P. Alcorn was secretary in 1948

- 1949–1952 R. E. Pashen (Presbyterian)
- 1954 T. Rees Thomas

W. E. Hurst (Baptist) has been mentioned as a prominent member,
