= Jireh Baptist Church, Brisbane =

The Jireh (Note: Taken from the book of Genesis, "jireh" is understood to mean "The Lord will provide".) Baptist Church was a place of worship in Gipps Street, Fortitude Valley, a suburb of Brisbane. It was established in 1862 by Rev. John Kingsford, its pastor for 37 years, and folded in 1978.

== Pastors ==
- John Kingsford (1813–1905) was pastor 1861–1899. He was uncle of Charles Kingsford Smith's mother.
- Ernest A. Kirwood (died 1954), pastor 1899–1904 He preached at the church's 60th anniversary and attended its 88th anniversary service in 1950.
- J. E. Walton pastor 1904–1909
- A. C. Jarvis (died 1934) 1910–1916
- Benjamin Hewison (died 1938) pastor 1919–1924. His wife died in 1946.
- Thomas McColl (died 1946) pastor 1926–1930
- Charles J. W. Moon (died 1937), temporary pastor 1930
- S. M. Potter was temporary pastor, permanent 1932–1939.

Four "daughter churches" arose from the efforts of the "Jireh" congregation:

- Nundah
- Windsor road, Brisbane
- Albion
- Toowong

The churches at Bulimba and Enoggera received much assistance from "Jireh".

Notable communicants include Miss Plested (missionary in India), Revs W Richer, T. Zettich (of Windsor Road Church), W. Higlett (secretary to NSW Baptist Union), T. N. Symonds (superintendent for Baptist Home Missions in Queensland), A. E. Bickmore (longtime treasurer for the Baptist Association in Queensland), Gray Parker (of Wynnum Church) and evangelist W. L. Jarvis.
