= W. L. Jarvis =

Gospel singer and evangelist

Wilfred Lemuel Jarvis (28 January 1895 – 30 October 1977) was a Baptist evangelist and gospel singer in Brisbane and Sydney, Australia.

== History ==
Jarvis was born in Cheshire, England, a son of Harriett Ann Jarvis (c. 1870 – 26 August 1933) and Arthur Charles Jarvis (c. 1868 – March 1934). The family moved to Australia around 1910, and A. C. Jarvis was soon preaching at the Jireh Baptist Church (Note: The Jireh Baptist Church was established in Gipps Street, Fortitude Valley, Queensland in 1862 by Rev. John Kingsford, its pastor for 37 years. He was uncle of Charles Kingsford Smith's mother. Rev. S. M. Potter was temporary pastor, permanent from 1932. The church folded in 1978.) and pastor of the Ipswich Baptist church 1919–1920, followed by Burnie, and other towns in Tasmania 1921–1923, then returned to New South Wales.

Jarvis volunteered for service with the First AIF on 19 July 1918, giving his occupation as "theological student", but was not required to serve overseas as the Armistice intervened, and was discharged in November 1918.

In the 1920s he toured Australia and New Zealand, popular for his forceful preaching and musicality. He was an excellent pianist, vocalist and expert leader of community singing. He was assisted by his father, A. C. Jarvis, in Tasmania in 1922.

In 1932 he was assistant to Rev. C. James Tinsley, president of the Australian Baptist Union and of Stanmore Baptist Church.

He was appointed pastor of the Bathurst Street Baptist Church, reckoned the "mother church" of Baptists in NSW, in 1935 and left in 1937.

He was elected president of the Council of Churches in New South Wales in 1937, at a time of upheaval, the Church of England having quit the organisation.

In 1952 he was elected President-General of the Baptist Union of Australia and a vice-president of the Baptist World Alliance.

== Publications ==
- The King of Kings (1920)
- Cheer Up the Heart Campaign Song Book (1932)

== Family ==
Jarvis was a brother of Charles Jarvis; Edwin Jarvis, and Grace Jarvis.

Jarvis married Bessie May Stumbles (17 May 1891 – 9 December 1971), Sunday-school teacher at Jireh in Brisbane in 1920. Their children include:

- Doreen May Jarvis (8 February 1923 – ) married C. D. Ransley
- Wilfred Arthur Henry Jarvis (3 June 1924 – 1 Oct 2021) engaged to Hilary Kelshaw; professor of psychology, married Pamela Salkeld
- David Ronald Jarvis (5 July 1926 – )
- Edith May Jarvis (23 August 1927 – )

Stanley Jarvis (died 18 February 1933), a Methodist preacher in Western Australia, South Australia and the Northern Territory 1923–1927, (Note: Jarvis, who had been a missionary in Fiji, in 1928 preached a sermon abhorring Constable Murray's punitive expedition which followed the murder of Frederick Brooks, in which 17 Aboriginals (others estimate up to 1,000) were claimed shot dead. Jarvis Road, Acacia Hills, Northern Territory, is named for him.) is most likely not related.
