= Fairfield, Queensland =

Fairfield
- Suburb
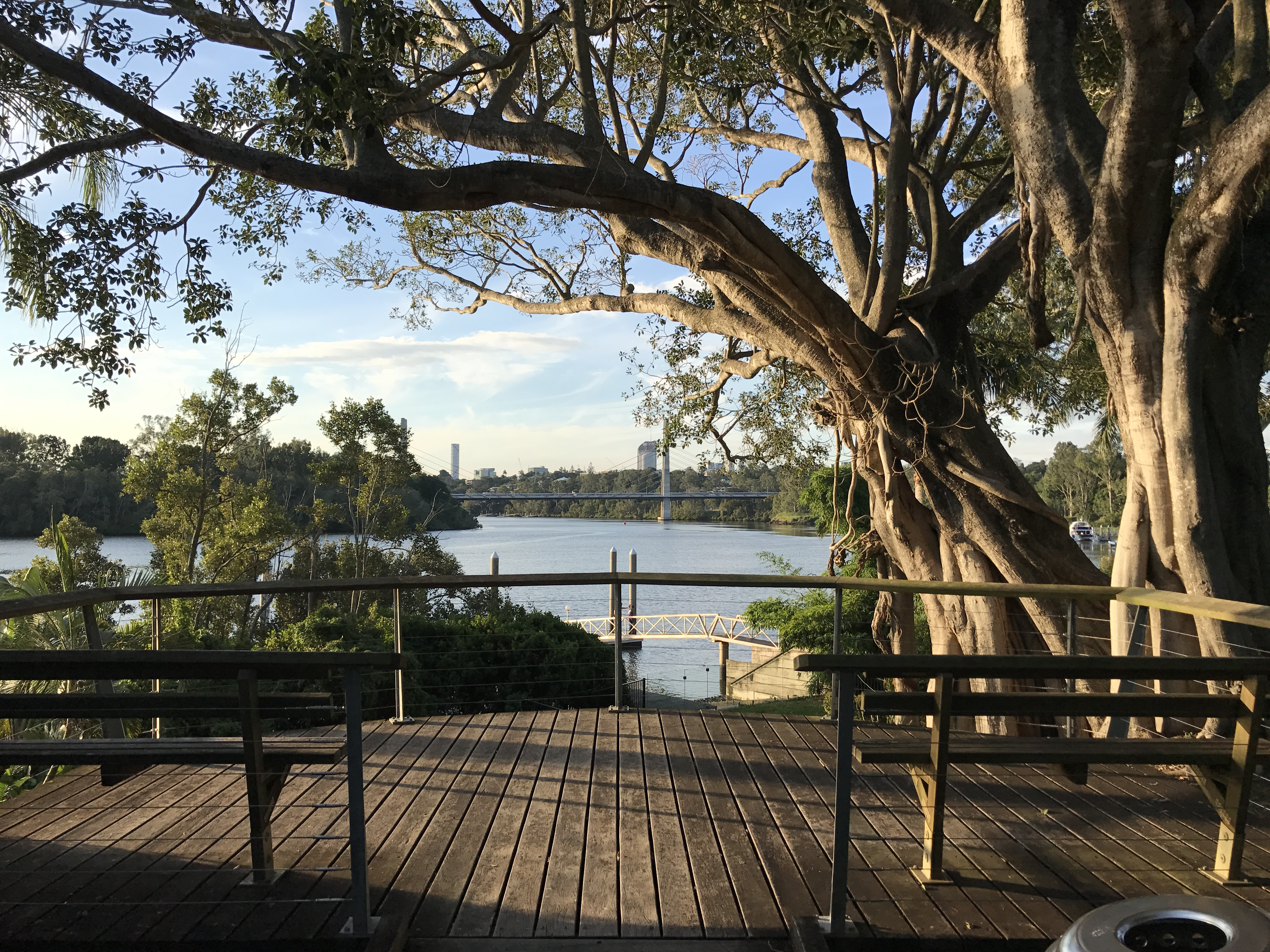
- View from Fairfield along Brisbane River towards Eleanor Schonell Bridge, 2017

- Interactive map of Fairfield
- Coordinates: 27.5066°S 153.0233°E
- Country: Australia
- State: Queensland
- City: Brisbane
- LGA: City of Brisbane (Tennyson Ward)
- Location: 5.5 km (3.4 mi) S of Brisbane CBD

Government
  - State electorates: Miller; Brisbane
  - Federal division: Moreton

Area
  - Total: 1.3 km^{2} (0.50 sq mi)
- Elevation: 12 m (39 ft)

Population
  - Total: 3,106 (2021 census)
  - Density: 2,390/km^{2} (6,190/sq mi)
- Time zone: UTC+10:00 (AEST)
- Postcode: 4103
Suburbs around Fairfield
St Lucia	Dutton Park	Woolloongabba
Yeronga	Fairfield	Annerley
Yeronga	Yeronga	Annerley

Fairfield is a suburb of the City of Brisbane, Queensland, Australia. In the 2021 census, Fairfield had a population of 3,106 people.

== Geography ==
Fairfield is located 5.8 kilometres (3.6 mi) south of the Brisbane CBD on the Brisbane River. The suburb is mainly residential with house and unit accommodation.

Fairfield is bounded to the north by the South Brisbane Cemetery, to the east by the Beenleigh railway line, to the south by Venner Road and to the west by the median of the Brisbane River.

== History ==
Samuel Grimes and brother George Grimes immigrated to Queensland on the Chaseley in 1849, one of the ships chartered by Dr John Dunmore Lang. In 1857 they established an arrowroot farm called Fairfield in the area, providing the name for the suburb.

The Fairfield Baptist Church opened for worship on 24 December (Christmas Eve) 1865 followed by a celebratory luncheon on 26 December (Boxing Day) 1865 as a branch of the Vulture Street Baptist Church. Located on the south-western corner of Dudley Street and Lang Street (now Lagonda Street, 27.5102°S 153.0280°E) approximately 1/4 mile (0.40 km) west of Ipswich Road, it was large enough to accommodate 90 to 100 people. In 1889 a new church was erected, with a stump-capping ceremony on Saturday 2 March 1889. By 1927 it was decided that the church needed a more prominent location, eventually culminating in the relocation of the church building to 470 Ipswich Road, Annerley, where it was refurbished before re-opening there as Annerley Baptist Church on Saturday 9 February 1935 by Reverend J.C. Farquhar.

In 1914 the Railside Estate was a subdivision of 28 residential lots for the land bounded by Bell Lane (now Bledisloe Street) to the north, the South Coast railway line to the east, Venner Road to the south, and Cross Street to the west. The estate was described as "within a stones throw from the Fairfield railway station".

Parts of Fairfield were flooded in the 1974 floods.

The Fairfield Library opened in 1988 with a major refurbishment in 2011.

Parts of Fairfield were flooded in the January 2011 Brisbane flood.

== Demographics ==
In the 2011 census, Fairfield had a population of 2,554 people, 50.2% female and 49.8% male. The median age of the Fairfield population was 31 years of age, 6 years below the Australian median. 69.2% of people living in Fairfield were born in Australia, compared to the national average of 69.8%; the next most common countries of birth were England 3.2%, New Zealand 3.1%, Malaysia 1.5%, China 1.2%, Vietnam 1.2%. 77.3% of people spoke only English at home; the next most popular languages were 2.4% Mandarin, 2% Greek, 1.7% Vietnamese, 1.7% Spanish, 0.9% German.

In the 2016 census, Fairfield had a population of 2,980 people.

In the 2021 census, Fairfield had a population of 3,106 people.

== Education ==
There are no schools in Fairfield. The nearest government primary schools are Dutton Park State School in the neighbouring Dutton Park to the north, Junction Park State School in neighbouring Annerley to the east, and Yeronga State School in neighbouring Yeronga to the south. The nearest government secondary schools are Brisbane South State Secondary College in Dutton Park and Yeronga State High School in Yeronga.

== Amenities ==
Fairfield has a skate park on Home Street in J.F. O’Grady Memorial Park.

Fairfield Gardens is a shopping centre at 180 Fairfield Road. It contains a supermarket and various other shops and stores.

The Brisbane City Council operates a public library at Fairfield Gardens.

The suburb borders the Brisbane River and has many parks.

== Transport ==
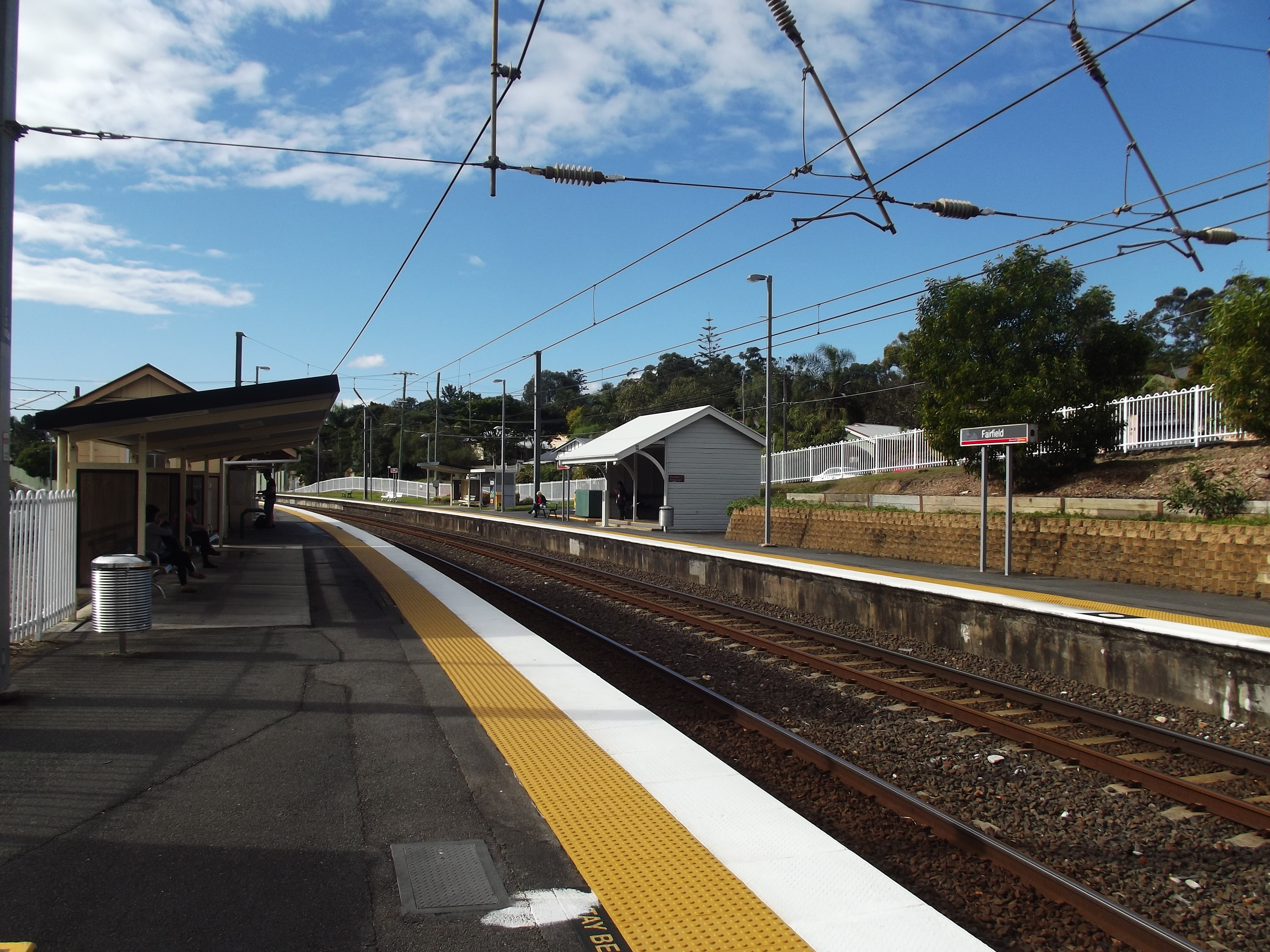
Northbound view from Platform 2 of the Fairfield railway station in 2012

Fairfield railway station is on the line to Beenleigh and its extension to the Gold Coast. The main bus service is the 196, which runs every 15 minutes during the day and commences at Fairfield Gardens. During the morning peak the 107 and 108 bus services are also available. There is also a taxi rank.
