= Rhyndarra =

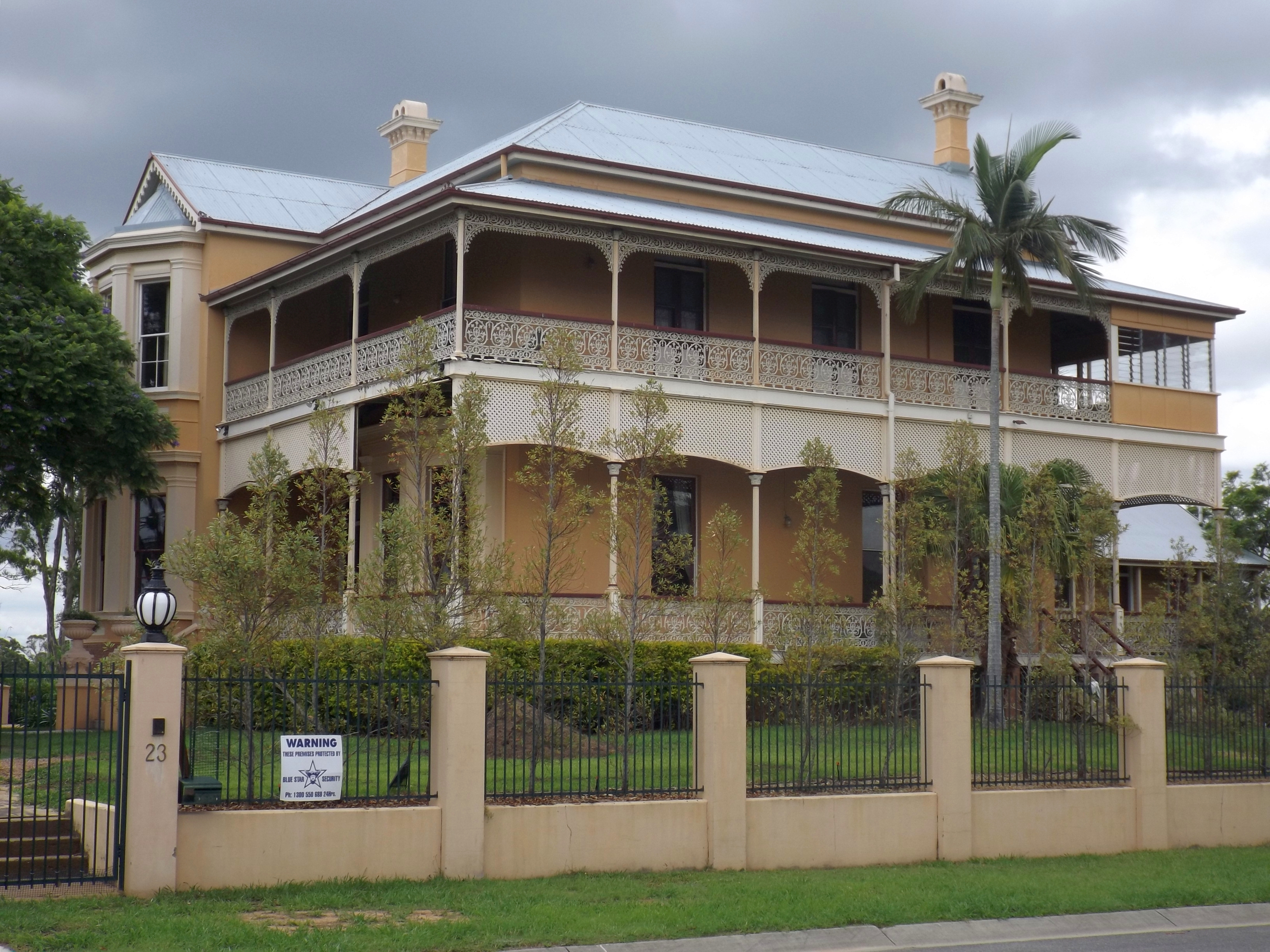
- Rhyndarra, 2015

- Location within Queensland
- 27.5149°S 153.0049°E
- Location: 23 Riverview Place, Yeronga, City of Brisbane, Queensland, Australia

History
- Design period: 1870s–1890s (late 19th century)
- Built: 1888–1938

Queensland Heritage Register
- Official name: Rhyndarra, 2 Women's Hospital, Australian Military Forces 1st Military Hospital; National Service Training Hospital, Yeronga Girls' Industrial School; 1 Camp Hospital
- Type: state heritage (built, landscape)
- Designated: 7 February 2005
- Reference no.: 600360
- Significant period: 1880s–1890s, 1930s (fabric); 1880s–1950s (historical); 1890s–1990s (social)
- Significant components: trees/plantings, stables, views to, residential accommodation – main house, garden/grounds, cellar, views from, service wing

Rhyndarra is a heritage-listed residence located at 23 Riverview Place, Yeronga, City of Brisbane, Queensland, Australia. The architect was Andrea Stombuco. It was built from 1888 to 1938. It is also known as No. 2 Women's Hospital, Australian Military Forces 1st Military Hospital, National Service Training Hospital, No. 1 Camp Hospital, and Yeronga Girls' Industrial School. It was added to the Queensland Heritage Register on 7 February 2005.

== History ==
This substantial, two-storeyed brick residence and stable was built in 1889 for Brisbane businessman William Williams, as his semi-rural suburban residence. Between 1897 and 1942 it functioned as a Salvation Army Girls' Industrial School, and from 1942 until the late 1990s as a military hospital.

=== Establishment of Rhyndarra ===
In the late 1880s Williams acquired approximately 140 acres of land along the riverfront at Yeronga. The area at this time comprised a mixture of large farming estates and smaller residential subdivisions and was developing as a middle-class suburb following the opening of the Yeronga railway station in 1885.

It was built in 1889 for William Williams, manager of the Australasian Steam Navigation Company prior to the merger that created the Australasian United Steam Navigation Company. It was designed in 1888 by the Italian architect Andrea Stombuco, and features a two-storey bay window front, gabled roof and decorative cast iron verandah trim. Constructed of stone and brick, it included a cellar, separate service quarters, kitchen, dairy, coach house and stables. Built on a rise facing south west, it has extensive views of the Canoe Reach of the Brisbane River, so named because it is near Oxley Creek, which was originally called Canoe Creek following stranded timber-getter Thomas Pamphlett finding an aboriginal bark canoe there in 1823, enabling him and his two companions to eventually return to civilisation.

Andrea Stombuco, in practice with his son Giovanni, was an Italian who had arrived in Brisbane in the 1870s after working for a period in the southern colonies. He designed many churches and ecclesiastical buildings for the Catholic Church in Queensland and was completing the opulent Her Majesty's Theatre in Queen Street when Rhyndarra was commissioned. He was noted for his residential work, which included Palma Rosa at Hamilton, an elaborate three-storeyed sandstone residence erected in 1886–1887. Rhyndarra was amongst Stombuco's last Brisbane works before moving to Western Australia in 1891.

Rhyndarra was constructed in 1888–1889 at a cost of £3,200. The buildings were erected by contractor R Smith and the lavish interior decoration to the main house was carried out by Lang & Co. The decorative finishes included cedar joinery, marble fireplace surrounds and ornate plaster ceilings and cornices.

Rhyndarra was typical of the large houses built by Brisbane's more prosperous citizens in the late 19th century. The house was raised off the ground on a stone base forming cellars and storerooms, with the ground floor containing dining and drawing rooms with bedrooms on the first floor. A pantry, kitchen and scullery were located at the rear of the house at ground level, with maids' rooms and a bathroom above.

Williams appears to have over-extended financially in his 1880s land dealings. During the depression of the 1890s Williams was forced to relinquish the heavily-mortgaged Rhyndarra to the Australian Mutual Provident Society (AMP) who became mortgagee-in-possession. Williams moved to Western Australia where he lived with a married daughter until his death in the early 20th century.

=== Salvation Army ===
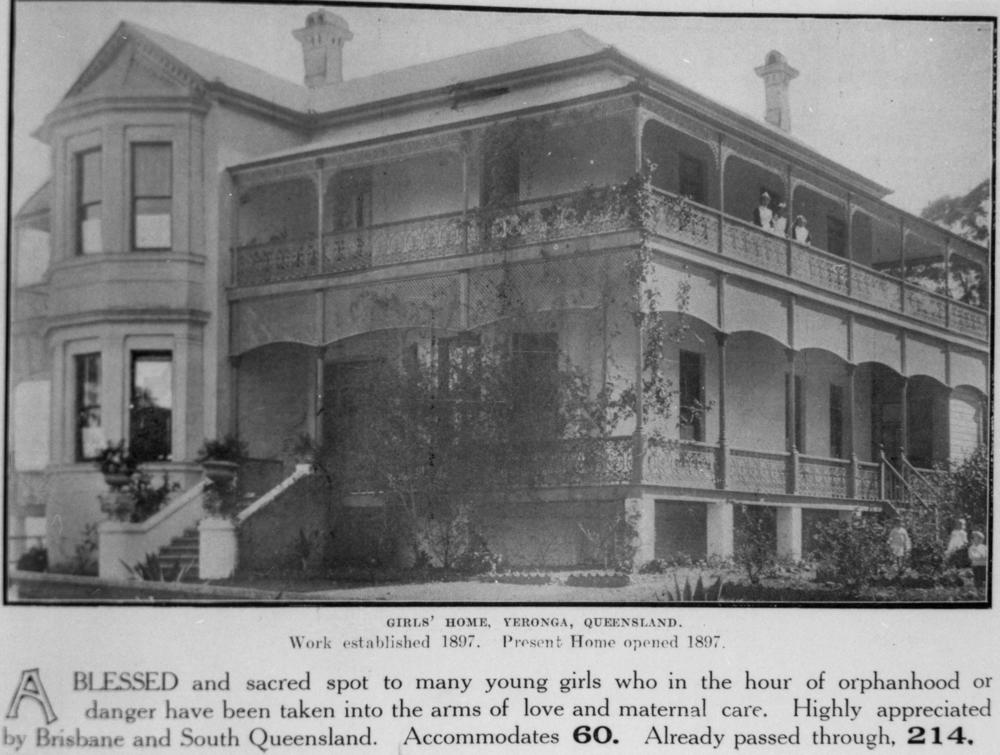
Salvation Army Girl's Home at Yeronga ~1897

The house and land were unoccupied for a period after Williams' departure until leased by the Salvation Army and opened as a home for orphaned and endangered girls (the Yeronga Girls' Industrial School) in 1897. In 1905 Williams was declared insolvent and the AMP Society become the owner of the property. The AMP Society organised the sale of the Rhyndarra estate at which time the property was subdivided into 13 residential lots, each having a street and river frontage. Rhyndarra, on a reduced site of approximately 12 acres, was transferred to William Booth, founder of the Salvation Army, in 1907.

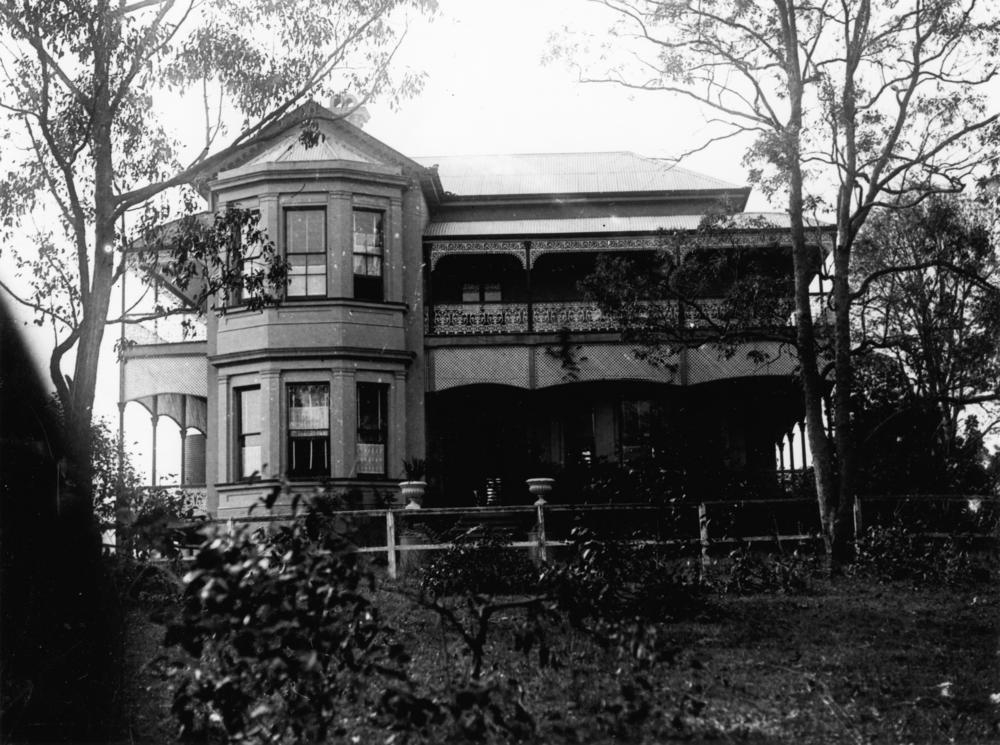
Rhyndarra ~1913

Booth had established the Salvation Army in England in the mid 1860s as a church with a strong social conscience, campaigning against poverty and the sins of alcoholism and other moral failings. A large part of the work of the church was in establishing homes for people who were destitute, aged, unmarried mothers, orphans and others in need or in peril.

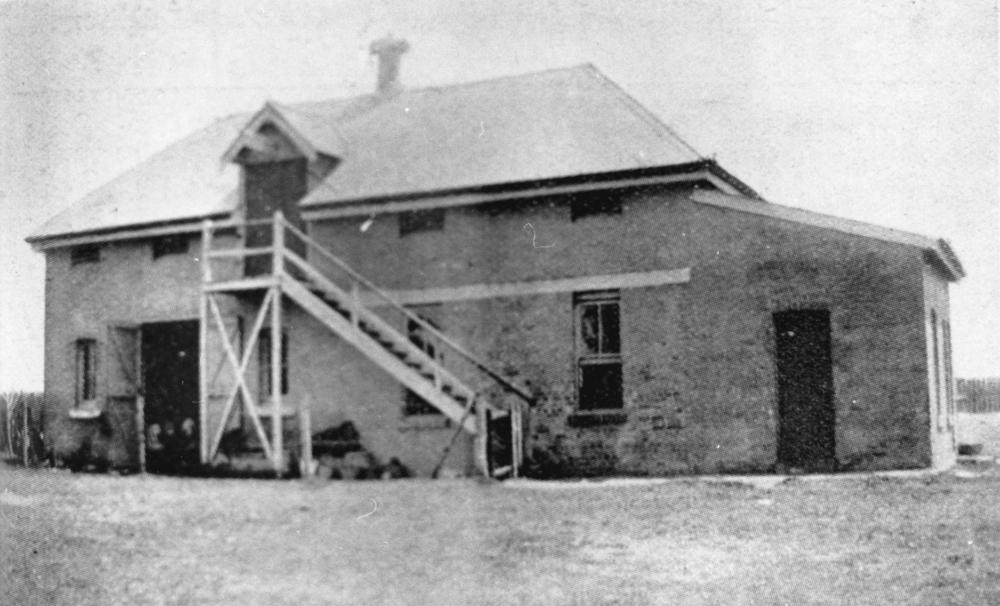
Old Stables, part of the residence, Rhynadarra, ca. 1931. The building was used as a schoolroom for the Salvation Army Home

The Girls' Industrial School at Yeronga was one of a number of similar institutions conducted by the Salvation Army in Queensland at this time, including maternity hospitals, receiving some financial assistance from the government for the orphanages. These institutions were periodically visited by public servants who monitored the welfare of the children.

The girls who lived at Rhyndarra were trained for domestic service and situations were found for them when they were old enough to leave the orphanage. In 1910 the matron noted that "each girl is taught housework in all its branches, gradually passing through the different stages from dormitories to dining room, laundry to kitchen and pantry." The house was adapted to accommodate the number of girls resident in the institution. The folding doors dividing the drawing and dining rooms were removed to form the main dormitory and the sitting room was used as a dining room. Upstairs rooms were used to accommodate the girls and the staff, including a matron, cooks and a teacher. The stable was converted for use a schoolroom, where the younger girls were taught basic lessons. The older girls helped look after the younger girls and could attend state schools in surrounding suburbs or were employed in the workroom where they learnt needlework and other tasks, or helped milk the cows. The home aimed at self-sufficiency, with a kitchen garden and flower garden, pigs, chickens, cows and horses.

Numbers at the orphanage fluctuated with changing circumstances and the institution accommodated girls who were orphaned, whose parents were destitute and could not care for them, who had run away or were difficult. In 1899 there were about 30 girls at the home, ranging from 6 to 16 years of age. In the early 1900s there were only 18 girls resident, but by the 1930s and the economic depression of that period the population increased to between 60 and 70 girls, ranging from babies to teenagers.

The greatest change to the physical fabric of Rhyndarra during the Salvation Army's occupation was the construction of a two-storeyed timber and masonry extension at the rear of the house. This extension housed a recreation hall on the first floor, with bathrooms and toilets at ground level. It was constructed by the Salvation Army in 1938 with government funding.

=== World War II ===
The Salvation Army operated the Girls' Industrial School at Rhyndarra until the Australian Army requisitioned the property in 1942 and the girls were transferred to other institutions outside Brisbane.

Australia had joined Britain in a declaration of war after Germany's invasion of Poland on 1 September 1939. In 1942 Rhyndarra was occupied by the Australian Army for training purposes for the Australian Women's Army Service (AWAS) and as a staging area for members en route to places further north and west. The Australian Army established a military hospital for Australian servicewomen in the grounds of the property, with Rhyndarra becoming the Officers' mess and quarters. The hospital provided training for the Australian Army Medical Women's Service (AAMWS).

When war was declared in 1939, there were no Army hospitals in Australia. In the next few years a range of hospitals was built in Australia and overseas, with a total of more than 100 wartime military hospitals operating in Australia. Casualty Clearing Stations (CCS) were located close to the action, both overseas and in Australia, and were little more than tent hospitals set up in the field where casualties were treated and sent onwards for further care. General hospitals were similar to these, although larger and slightly more advanced. Some general hospitals were established overseas in the field. These hospitals returned to Australia (as discrete medical units) with their divisions and were re-established mostly away from the major population centres. Women's hospitals were of a similar type to general hospitals and of this type 26 were built. Of these, it is thought that part of the hospital at Bonegilla in Victoria, is the only one to survive. Other hospitals included camp hospitals and base hospitals. Like women's hospitals, these were constructed in the capital cities and in areas of great troop concentrations, and were more likely permanent structures of timber, fibrous cement sheet and/or corrugated iron, or were established in existing buildings such as houses, which the Army took over as a matter of national importance.

In 1943–1944 the Commonwealth Department of Public Works, at the request of the Allied Works Council (AWC), constructed the Australian Women's Hospital at Yeronga. The construction period for the hospital was estimated at four months and it had been completed by June 1944. The new facility provided accommodation for 160 female patients. It comprised fibrous cement and weatherboard wards with kitchens, operating theatre and admission building, all linked by covered ways. Ancillary buildings included pathological, laboratories, canteen and administration units.

The hospital was erected to the northeast of Rhyndarra house and a group of small huts were erected along the northeastern boundary of the site as sleeping quarters for the AAMWS. The nurses had their own sleeping quarters to the southwest of Rhyndarra, with the house used for administration offices, officer's mess, and for recreation. Some minor alterations were made to the house, including removing some of the alterations made by the Salvation Army. The stable was used as the quartermaster's store.

This establishment at Yeronga was known as 2 Women's Hospital (2WH). As a distinct medical unit 2WH had been situated at Redbank, in association with the 2/4 Australian General Hospital (AGH), but it moved completely to the purpose built complex at Yeronga by 1943. Only three specialist women's hospitals were established in Australia during the Second World War, the others being 1 Women's Hospital at Claremont in Western Australia and 3 Women's Hospital located in the grounds of the base hospital at Concord 113 General Hospital, Sydney.

Many women were required to assist the war effort, particularly during 1942 and 1943 when all able-bodied men were required to work in more forward areas. Special services were created to facilitate this, the largest of these being the AWAS (Australian Women's Army Service), formed in mid-1941 in order to release men from some military duties so that they could be employed with fighting units. Recruiting began in early 1942 and by 1944 there were more than 20,000 AWAS members.

The Australian Army Medical Women's Service (AAMWS) had grown out of the VADs (Voluntary Aid Detachments), volunteer women who assisted full-time nurses. With the declaration of war in 1939, approval was given for VADs to work in camp hospitals in Australia. As volunteers, these women worked without pay, but they performed essential work for the war effort. VADs were enrolled full-time and in 1941 were brought under the jurisdiction of the Army with the rank of private. Later in 1941 VADs were posted to military hospitals overseas, in groups of about 200. Recruitment was not a problem, but the large numbers of volunteers coming forward placed strains on those in charge. VADs were still under the administration of civilians and to distinguish between those working in civilian operations and those under the Army's jurisdiction were reclassified as the AAMWS. The AAMWS performed basic medical procedures and provided a back-up facility to the trained nurses of the Australian Army Nursing Service (AANS) in military hospitals. In total there were more than 8,500 members of the AAMWS.

Some members of the AAMWS who trained and worked at the Yeronga hospital were then sent overseas to the various medical units which served in New Guinea, Rabaul and other places in the front line serving at general hospitals. Others filled roles in army base hospitals in Australia such as Concord Hospital in Sydney and Heidelberg Hospital in Melbourne.

The 2 Women's Hospital at Yeronga was one of many similar establishments constructed around Brisbane during World War II for service personnel. Apart from the base hospital at Greenslopes (112 AGH) (now Greenslopes Private Hospital), numerous camp hospitals were established, as well as army camps, barracks and bases. Many of the camps and hospitals established in Brisbane were abandoned and disposed of by the Army after the war. The 2 Women's Hospital was retained and the Australian Government purchased the property in 1946.

After the war, those women who had participated in the services and in paid employment were asked to resume their pre-war lives. The AAMWS and other women's service organisations were demobilised, a process which took many months. It appears that 2 Women's Hospital at Yeronga was used immediately after the war for recuperating servicewomen and for medical check-ups before the women were demobbed.

=== Post World War II ===
In the administrative carving up of Australian Government's wartime property after 1945, the Rhyndarra site was allocated to the Department of Social Services. The DSS wanted to establish a centre for civilian rehabilitation on the site. However, due to the acute housing shortage after the war, the site was briefly allocated to the Queensland Housing Commission from the late 1940s to early 1950s as temporary accommodation for homeless people. Some alterations were made to the wards and other buildings, including Rhyndarra, for this purpose.

During the Cold War of the early 1950s, the Australian Government introduced national service. After the 1951 federal elections young men over the age of 18 had to register and serve in the Army, Navy or Air Force for a period of 5–6 months. In light of this recruiting activity, the Army was concerned about its facilities. The accommodation of recruits was provided at personnel depots in capital cities. The existing personnel depot at Indooroopilly was inadequate and Army officials believed that the former women's hospital at Yeronga would satisfactorily handle the recruits. The DSS agreed to the Army's reoccupation of the site and by the early 1950s the northern section of the former women's hospital became known as Northern Command Personnel Depot (NCPD). The southern part became a hospital for national service recruits and trainees. Known as the National Service Training Hospital in 1951, it was referred to as 1 Camp Hospital by the 1960s, after the NCPD has moved elsewhere in the late 1950s.

More recently the hospital expanded as 1 Military Hospital Yeronga, providing minor medical facilities for injured soldiers or those who had become sick during training. This necessitated the construction of a number of additional buildings, mostly accommodation and storage, and a pool and tennis court. Some of the buildings constructed during the Second World War had been demolished due to later construction works.

By the mid 1990s, the main hospital buildings such as the wards and the operating theatres were still extant, but had been adapted and altered several times. The admissions building and covered walkways remained, along with various other structures around the site. The AAMWS huts had been replaced by married quarters, the messes were demolished and replaced with new facilities, and the isolation and VD wards had been removed. Rhyndarra and the stables had been used continuously, with officers being accommodated in the main house since the early 1950s.

The 1 Military Hospital functioned together with the repatriation hospital at Greenslopes and facilities at Enoggera and treated its last patients mid-1996. A new hospital, constructed at Gallipoli Army Barracks, Enoggera, was commissioned in September 1996 and the former 1 Military Hospital was vacated.

Subsequently, the hospital buildings were demolished, leaving only the house Rhyndarra, stable and significant trees, prior to the property being subdivided into approximately 30 residential allotments. Rhyndarra was extensively refurbished, albeit on a greatly reduced block, and is now a family residence. The former stables is located on a separate allotment and became part of a new house, with the hay bale hoist beam on the upper floor still readily identifiable. Part of the riverfront of the original property is now a reserve for park purposes, under the trusteeship of the Brisbane City Council.

== Description ==
Rhyndarra comprises a two-storeyed rendered brick residence overlooking the Brisbane River towards Long Pocket to the south, a stables to the northwest of the house, and part of the park reserve to the south and southwest of the house, which was formerly part of the grounds. The house and stables are visible from the approach along Riverview Place.

The house rests on a raised square-snecked stone base. It has a hipped corrugated iron roof with projecting gable above a hipped bay to the southeast.

Double height verandahs almost encircle the building, being broken by a projecting two-storeyed bay on the southern corner. The verandahs have cast iron columns and balustrade, with cast iron brackets and valance to the first floor and a timber lattice valance to the ground floor. The rear first floor verandah has been partially enclosed with fibrous cement and glass louvre panels. Walls are scribed to represent ashlar, the projecting bay has sash windows framed by rendered pilasters supporting a deep cornice and the gable above has a scalloped bargeboard.

The building is entered via a flight of steps adjacent to the projecting bay with rendered balustrades supporting large urns. The main entry has paired, panelled cedar doors with sidelights and fanlight, with a bay window to the verandah adjacent. French doors with fanlights and tall sash windows open onto the verandahs.

The building has a two-storeyed masonry service wing to the northwest, with a lower two-storeyed addition (1938). This addition has a masonry ground floor, chamferboard first floor and gable roof. A narrow timber stair accesses the first floor verandah from the rear re-entrant corner.

Internally, the ground floor contains a wide entrance hall, with a cedar staircase with turned balustrade and a tall arched sash window. The building has plastered walls, ornate plaster ceilings and cornices, cedar panelled doors, architraves and skirtings and a variety of marble fireplace surrounds. The northeast rooms on the ground floor are connected by a wide opening that originally housed folding cedar doors. The rear wing accommodates a kitchen, bathrooms and service rooms.

The grounds immediately surrounding the house contain remnant plantings from the various gardens that have existed. These include a large Jacaranda to the southeast, lilly pilly to the west and a small garden to the north which contains a crow's ash, frangipani and silky oak. The area of the property fronting the Brisbane River contains a number of large Eucalyptus spp.

The original Rhyndarra stable is located to the northwest of the house, separated from it by Heritage Close. This brick structure has a steeply pitched corrugated iron roof with a lean-to addition at the northeast end. The building has been adaptively reused as a private residence, with sleeping areas to the loft level and living and bedroom areas to the ground level. Roof-lights have been added, and an internal staircase constructed. A single-storeyed addition has been constructed to the south comprising living, kitchen and bathroom areas. The adaptive reuse has retained a strong visual connection between the stable and the villa.

== Heritage listing ==
Ryndarra was added to the Queensland Heritage Register on 7 February 2005 having satisfied the following criteria.

The place is important in demonstrating the evolution or pattern of Queensland's history.

Constructed in 1888–89 Rhyndarra, comprising house, stables and surviving grounds, is important for the evidence it provides of the way of life of Brisbane's more prosperous citizens in the late 19th century. As a large semi-rural estate, it was closely associated with the development of Yeronga as a middle-class suburb following the opening of the Yeronga Railway Station in 1885, yet occupied a middle ground between farm and suburban residence.

The place is important in demonstrating the principal characteristics of a particular class of cultural places.

Rhyndarra is important in demonstrating the principal characteristics of its class of cultural places: large, late 19th century villa residences set in substantial grounds. These characteristics include: the form (two-storeyed); materials (brick on stone foundations); planning of both the main residence (public rooms downstairs, bedrooms on the upper floor, attached service wing) and the grounds (siting of the house overlooking the river, relationship of the house to auxiliary buildings such as the stables, and garden plantings) and decorative detailing and finishes (including ornate plaster ceilings and cornices, cedar panelled doors, architraves and skirtings and a variety of marble fireplace surrounds). It is a fine example of the work of Brisbane architect Andrea Stombuco.

The place is important because of its aesthetic significance.

Through its form, scale and siting as a riverside residence and together with its remnant plantings, Rhyndarra is of considerable aesthetic significance and the detailing of its materials and finishes reflects a fine quality of workmanship.

The place has a special association with the life or work of a particular person, group or organisation of importance in Queensland's history.

Rhyndarra has a special association with the work of the Salvation Army in housing and protecting orphans and other disadvantaged people in the early 20th century, particularly its concern for orphaned or homeless girls. The rear wing, added by the Salvation Army, has special value as it illustrates the adaptation of the building for use as a girls' home. Rhyndarra is also important for its strong association with the Australian Army as part of the military hospital established in the grounds of Rhyndarra in 1943/44.
