= Yeronga State High School =

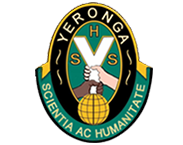

Location
- 159 Villa Street; Brisbane, Queensland, 4121; Australia; 27.5168°S 153.0228°E

Information
- Type: Public, co-educational, secondary, day school
- Motto: Scientia ac humanitate (Knowledge and humanity)
- Established: 25 January 1960
- Principal: Timothy Barraud
- Grades: 7–12
- Enrolment: 776
- Campus: Urban (Yeronga)
- Colours: Green, gold and black
- Website: yerongashs.eq.edu.au

Yeronga State High School (YSHS) is a co-educational state secondary school located in Yeronga, Queensland, Australia, five kilometres (3.1 mi) away from the Brisbane central business district. As of August 2021, Yeronga State High School had an enrolment of 776 students.

Yeronga has a diverse student population; in 2017, 27% of students enrolled were born in Australia.

In 2021, average class sizes were 21 (years 7 to 10) and 16 (years 11 to 12).

== History ==
Yeronga State High School was opened on 25 January 1960, with 217 students and 12 staff members. Enrolment peaked at 1,821 students in 1971: after which, enrolment declined due to the opening of Acacia Ridge State High School and Holland Park State High School, which both opened in 1971. Enrolment has since consistently remained at around ~770 students.

== Sporting houses ==
There are three sporting houses at Yeronga State High School:

- Avoca
- Kadumba
- Shottery

== Principals ==
The following principals have led the school since it was opened:

- W Kemp; 1960
- F T Barrell; 1961–1970
- N J Corfield; 1971–1983
- I K Smith; 1984–1987
- B G Tracey; 1988–2000
- Valerie Hadgelias; 2001–2003
- Alan Jones; 2004–2007
- Terry Heath; 2007–2021
- Timothy Barraud; 2022–present

== Notable alumni ==
=== Students ===
- Mabior Chol – Australian rules football player
- Bryan Law – Australian activist
- Thelma Plum – musician

=== Faculty ===
- Ian Dorricott – composer

== See also ==
- Education in Australia
- Lists of schools in Queensland
