= Woolloongabba Police Station =

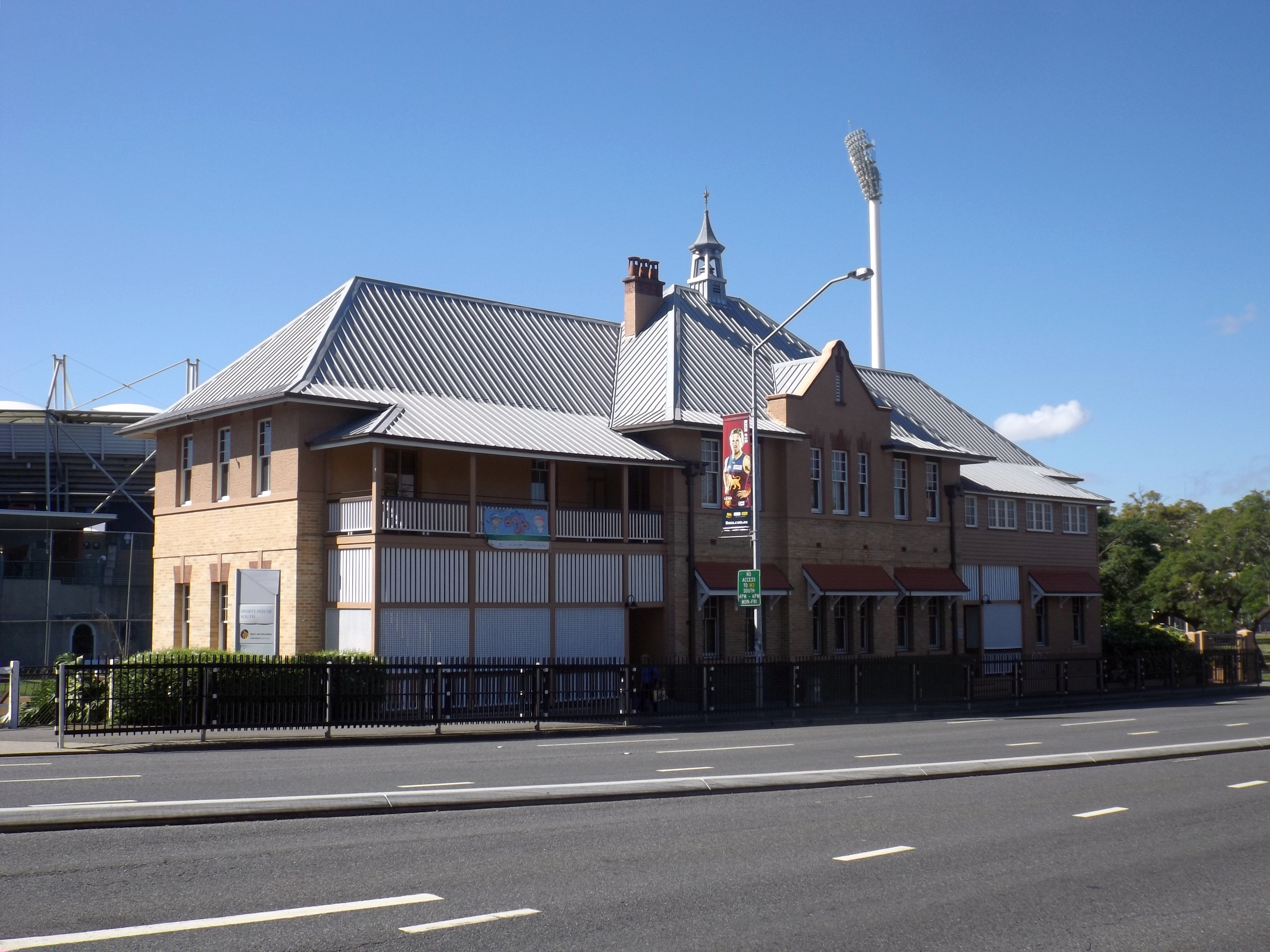
- View from Main Road, 2015

- Location within Queensland Location within Australia
- 27.4854°S 153.0362°E
- Location: 842–848 Main Street, Woolloongabba, City of Brisbane, Queensland, Australia

History
- Design period: 1900–1914 (early 20th century)
- Built: 1913–1936

Site notes
- Architect: Queensland Department of Public Works
- Architectural style: Classicism

Queensland Heritage Register
- Official name: Woolloongabba Police Station (former), South Coast District Headquarters, Woolloongabba Police Station
- Type: state heritage (built)
- Designated: 25 November 1994
- Reference no.: 601382
- Significant period: 1910s, 1930s (historical); 1913–1930s (fabric); 1913–1993 (social)
- Significant components: police station, barracks – police, office/s

Woolloongabba Police Station is a heritage-listed former police station at 842–848 Main Street, Woolloongabba, City of Brisbane, Queensland, Australia. It was designed by the Queensland Department of Public Works and built from 1913 to 1936. It is also known as South Coast District Headquarters and Woolloongabba Police Station. It was added to the Queensland Heritage Register on 25 November 1994.

== History ==
Completed in 1913, the two storeyed masonry building with basement, was the third police station in Woolloongabba.

The first police station in Woolloongabba was established in a rented house on Stanley Street, near Boggo Road (now Annerley Road). By 1888, the substantial population growth in Woolloongabba and surrounding suburbs meant the station facilities were no longer adequate, and the police station was removed to a rented house on Ipswich Road, near the Woolloongabba Fiveways. A lock-up facility was built in the yard of the house, and two years later, the adjacent house was used for accommodation. By 1910, the needs of the station had again outgrown the building, and approval was given for the erection of a new police station in Woolloongabba.

A portion (adjacent to a former Quarry Reserve) of the Woolloongabba Park Reserve facing Main Street was set apart as a Police Reserve thereby avoiding the need for the Government to purchase land for the new station. The design for the new building was prepared in 1911; AB Brady being Government Architect at the time. The contract sum for the building, which was completed and occupied in 1913, was £4,539.

Woolloongabba Police Station was one of a series of substantial two storeyed buildings erected as police stations during the early twentieth century. In addition to Woolloongabba, these included stations at Warwick (1901) (as part of the Warwick Court House) Maryborough (1907), Charters Towers Police Station (1911), Cairns (1912), Townsville (1914) and Kedron (1916). The plan of the Woolloongabba station and these other stations followed a generally similar pattern, with a vertical division of the building into a two storeyed residence for the senior commanding officer, and attached two storeyed barracks including dayroom and mess for the constables. The dayroom was generally the base for the station operations. This design reflected the contemporary mode of policing, whereby duty for constables generally involved patrolling the beat on foot and pursuing inquiries. Patrols were undertaken throughout 24 hours, divided into three eight-hour shifts, and the main function of the station was therefore to provide accommodation for police officers. Four cells were provided in the basement of Woolloongabba police station.

Electric lights were installed at the station in 1925, and the station was connected to sewage in 1926. In 1928, a dining room for constables was added to the rear of the station.

In 1934 a Headquarters for the South Coast Police District was needed, and the South Brisbane and Woolloongabba police buildings were the two possible locations. Woolloongabba was chosen, as it was considered to be the most central site, particularly with the anticipated opening of the Story Bridge, and had vacant land available for future development. The South Coast Police District covered approximately 2060 square miles.

The conversion of the Woolloongabba station into the district Headquarters demanded additional office accommodation, and it was considered that the rooms occupied by the Senior Sergeant could provide suitable additional office accommodation. The Senior Sergeant vacated his quarters at the station in October 1934.

Major additions to the station were undertaken in 1936. Completed the following year at an authorised cost of £9,555, this work comprised additions to the north and south ends of the existing building, an additional three-storey brick building at the rear of the existing one, also brick garage building, fences, etc. The building at the rear of the station was connected to the existing building by gangways at each floor level, and provided additional living and recreational facilities for the police. Concreting of the station yard and other similar projects were undertaken the following year, using day labour. The Police Reserve was extended to the north, to include a former Quarry Reserve at the corner of Main and Vulture Streets.

One of the requirements of the new Headquarters was the inclusion of a room for police to administer relief work, a government program instituted under the Income (Unemployment Relief) Act (1930) to reduce unemployment. On completion of the additions in 1937, rooms were provided in the basement for a Relief Office, records and public counter. The work also included the formation of an assembly yard for relief workers at the northern end of the station, adjacent to the Relief Office. Relief labour was used throughout Queensland during the 1930s, to carry out projects such as construction of retaining walls and roads, and improvements to school grounds.

The South Coast District Headquarters moved from South Brisbane to the Woolloongabba station in September 1937.

A park and playground were completed in 1938 on land adjacent to the police station, at the corner of Main and Vulture Streets. The concept for the park and playground which covered approximately two and a half acres was attributed to the Police Welfare Club, and included three tennis courts, dressing rooms, grandstands, umpires' stands, and a playground or "children's sanctuary" where children would be able to play in safety under the eyes of the police. A basketball court was constructed in 1939.

By the late 1930s, the relief work was progressively being phased out. The relief office at the station was vacated during 1939, and the room taken over for records.

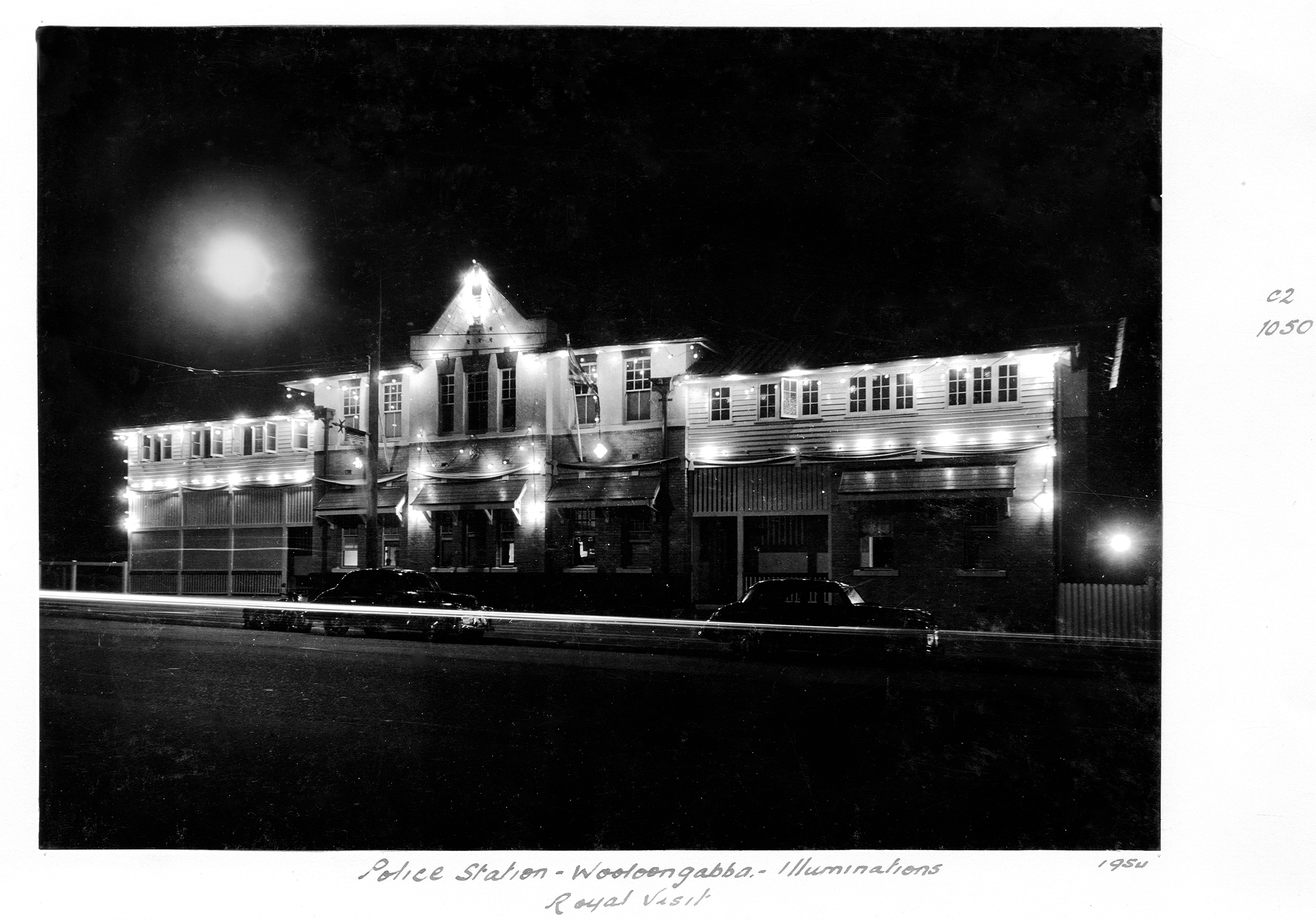
Woolloongabba Police Station illuminated for the Royal Visit, March 1954

The building ceased to be used as a barracks in early 1951. Also in 1951, the Criminal Investigation Branch moved into the building. The changing function of the building from residential to official appears to have been completed in 1954, when rooms previously used as bedrooms on the first floor of the building were occupied as offices by members of the CIB and the uniform inquiry staff. In 1964 the Kangaroo Point and East Brisbane police stations were closed, and these former police divisions were absorbed into the Woolloongabba Police Division.

Further alterations to the building were completed in 1967, when the southern end of the front portion of the building was extended by a single storey addition, and the gangway between the 1913 and 1937 buildings was enlarged to incorporate additional offices and rooms.

The playground and basketball court are no longer extant. The tennis courts were removed in early 1993, and replaced by cricket practice nets. The station was vacated by the police in July 1993.

The building was later used by the state Department of National Parks, Recreation, Sport and Racing and renamed "Sports House".

== Description ==
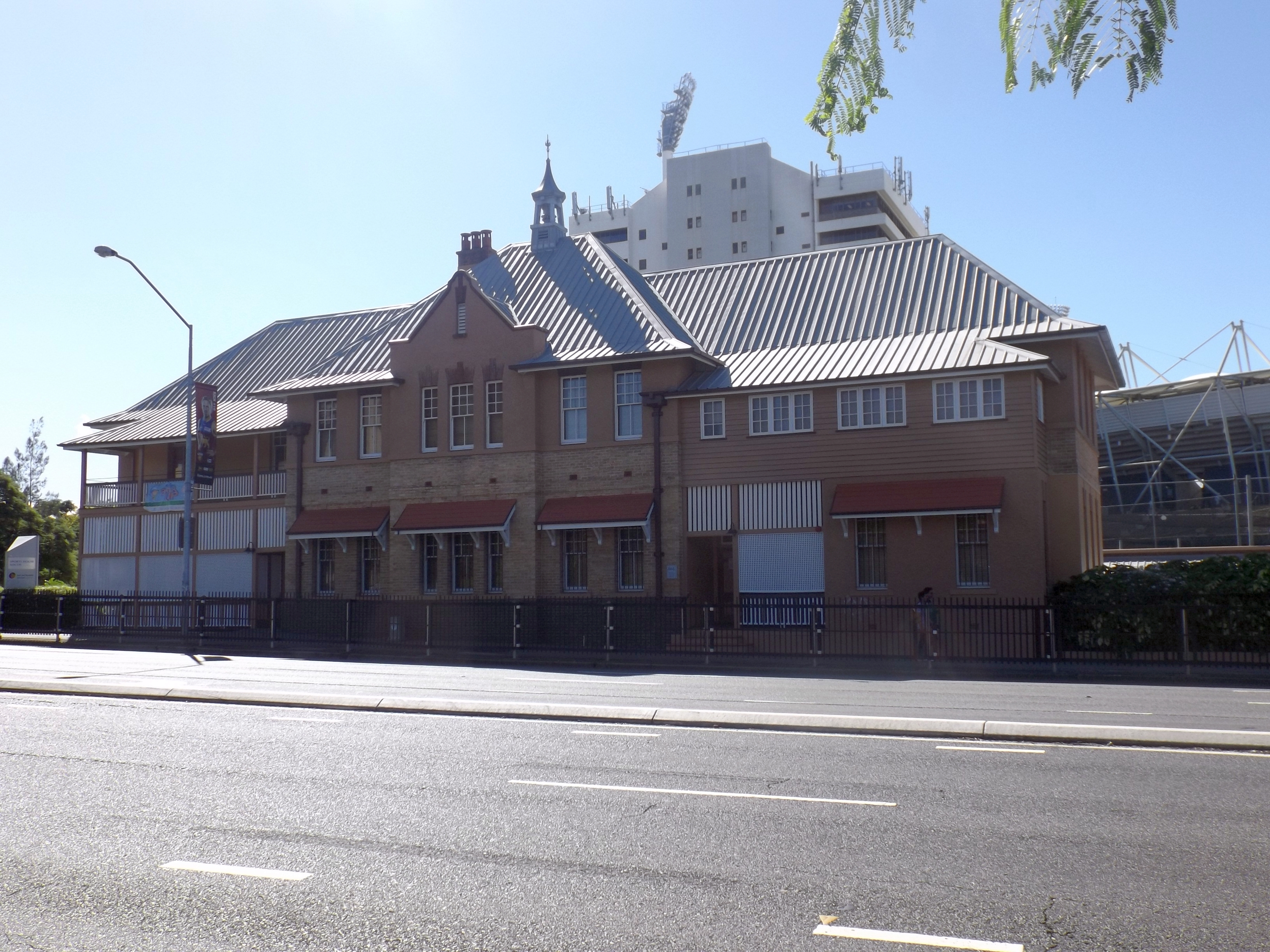
Building in 2015

The former Woolloongabba Police Station consists of a two-storeyed with sub-floor masonry structure built to the property boundary fronting Main Street to the west, and a three-storeyed masonry structure built parallel behind and connected via a two-storeyed overhead bridging structure. The ground level falls away to the east from the Main Street frontage to a level service yard providing access to the sub-floor rooms from the rear.

The Main Street structure has a hipped wide pan sheet metal roof, the central section of which is higher and crowned by a decorative fleche with a three pot chimney stack on the northern end, with kick-out eaves and verandah roofs. The building has an almost symmetrical street facade consisting of a central gabled section projecting from a central block which is flanked by enclosed verandahs to either side. The central gabled section has triple sash windows (the outer two of which are narrower) to both floors, and a base of dark brick to the ground floor sill height, with a lighter face brick to the first floor sill height, and stucco render above with face brick window heads and gable trim. The central block is treated in the same manner and has two sash windows to either side. The verandahs have been enclosed with stucco render over hardboard sheeting, and have a variety of fenestration. The ground floor has window awnings, with the central block having timber brackets with fibrous cement tiles, and the enclosed verandahs having metal sheeting.

The north end of the building has the lighter face brick to the first floor sill height with stucco render above and face brick window heads. The base is formed by rendered piers, part of which has been enclosed with louvres. The south end is similar, but the ground floor has been extended to the south with sub-floor parking space from the rear. This extension has a sheet metal roof concealed behind a parapet wall, stucco render and window awnings. The rear of the building has verandahs to both floors, enclosed with weatherboard and casement windows, and supported by brick piers with some timber battening forming a covered space to the sub-floor rooms behind. A timber staircase is located towards the southern end of the building.

The two-storeyed overhead bridging structure links the two floors of the building to the upper two floors of the rear parallel block. This spans the service yard and driveway and is supported by steel beams. It is clad in weatherboard with casement windows and has a hipped wide pan sheet metal roof.

The rear parallel building is a three-storeyed face brick structure with a hipped wide pan sheet metal roof. The building has rendered sills and bands at floor levels, with sash windows, high level hopper windows and louvres to the toilets. An incinerator and brick stack is located on the east wall.

Internally, each stage of construction of the Main Street building is visible. Verandah walls to the original section are of painted brickwork, with rendered brickwork to the second stage. Some end wall windows and doors are in place, and the south ground floor extension has hardboard ceilings and partition walls. Generally, the building has rendered walls with some partitioning, ceilings are boarded and enclosed verandahs have timber boarding or hardboard sheeting. There are two timber staircases either side of the central block, with a timber batten balustrade. There were originally two fireplaces on the ground floor of the central block, but the southern one and a section of wall were removed to create a large open plan room. The remaining fireplace is sealed. A toilet is located on the northern end of the ground floor rear verandah and contains timber partitioning and metal shower surround. Most internal doors have been removed, but an original five panelled timber door with hardware survives on the first floor, opening onto the southern streetfront enclosed verandah.

The sub-floor rooms consist of the former Relief Office and laundry on the northern side, and cells on the southern side. The offices and laundry consist of brick arches enclosed with window and door assemblies, with the offices having rendered walls and hardboard ceilings with timber cover strips and concrete floors. The laundry has concrete floors and a brick copper. There are four cells, with two opening to the east below the rear enclosed verandah and two opening to the south to a covered car parking area. These have limewash walls, concrete floors and steel doors. Two toilets are also located in this area.

Internally, the bridging structure has a passage on the northern side, with a large room on the southern side to the lower level, and two narrow rooms to the upper level. The passage section is earlier and the lower level has vertical timber boarding to the walls and a hardboard ceiling with timber cover strips. The rooms have hardboard partition walls and ceiling panels. Three steps access the rear building from the lower level.

Internally, the rear building has a central staircase with metal balustrade and newel posts, timber handrail and concrete treads. The ground and second floors have toilets on the northern side with original urinals, basins and cubicle partitions. Elsewhere there are open plan rooms, and a kitchen space is located on the ground floor northern side with a basin set in a timber bench. Walls are rendered and ceilings are of hardboard with timber cover strips.

A masonry carport, with a skillion wide pan sheet metal roof and concrete floor, is located to the south of the rear building. The remains of a masonry toilet block with a collapsed roof is located to the north of the rear building. The area between and around the buildings is concreted, with driveways from Main Street at both the south and north ends of the site. Positions of earlier piers to the bridging structure and rear stairs to the Main Street building are evidenced in the concreted service yard and driveway. A timber stair from the street level to the former assembly yard is located to the north of the Main Street building beside the driveway.

== Heritage listing ==
Woolloongabba Police Station (former) was listed on the Queensland Heritage Register on 25 November 1994 having satisfied the following criteria.

The place is important in demonstrating the evolution or pattern of Queensland's history.

Constructed in 1912–13 as the first purpose built police station in Woolloongabba, this was the third premises to be used for a police station and demonstrates the development of Woolloongabba. The choice of the building as the Headquarters for the South Coast Police District, which was influenced by the central location of the building and the impending opening of the Story Bridge, is also important in demonstrating the pattern of development of the southern suburbs of Brisbane from the 1930s.

The place is important in demonstrating the principal characteristics of a particular class of cultural places.

Evidence of the evolution of the role of police and police stations from the early twentieth century is visible in the building, in particular, the adaptation of the building from providing a predominantly accommodation function, to serving as an official base for extended police operations.

The place is important because of its aesthetic significance.

The former Woolloongabba Police Station faces Main Street, served as a prominent feature of the local streetscape. Constructed with a dark brick lower level and a rendered lighter brick upper level, the two-storey front building features a prominent central section and a decorative roof spire. A multi-storey rear building extension is connected to the primary structure via an enclosed walkway.

The place has a strong or special association with a particular community or cultural group for social, cultural or spiritual reasons.

The role of the building in providing an office and assembly yard for relief work during the 1930s, is also of social value.
