= Phoenix buildings =

Phoenix buildings may refer to:

- List of tallest buildings in Phoenix, USA
- Phoenix Buildings, Woolloongabba, heritage-listed commercial buildings in Brisbane, Queensland, Australia

== See also ==
- Phoenix Building (disambiguation)
