= Shop Row, Woolloongabba =

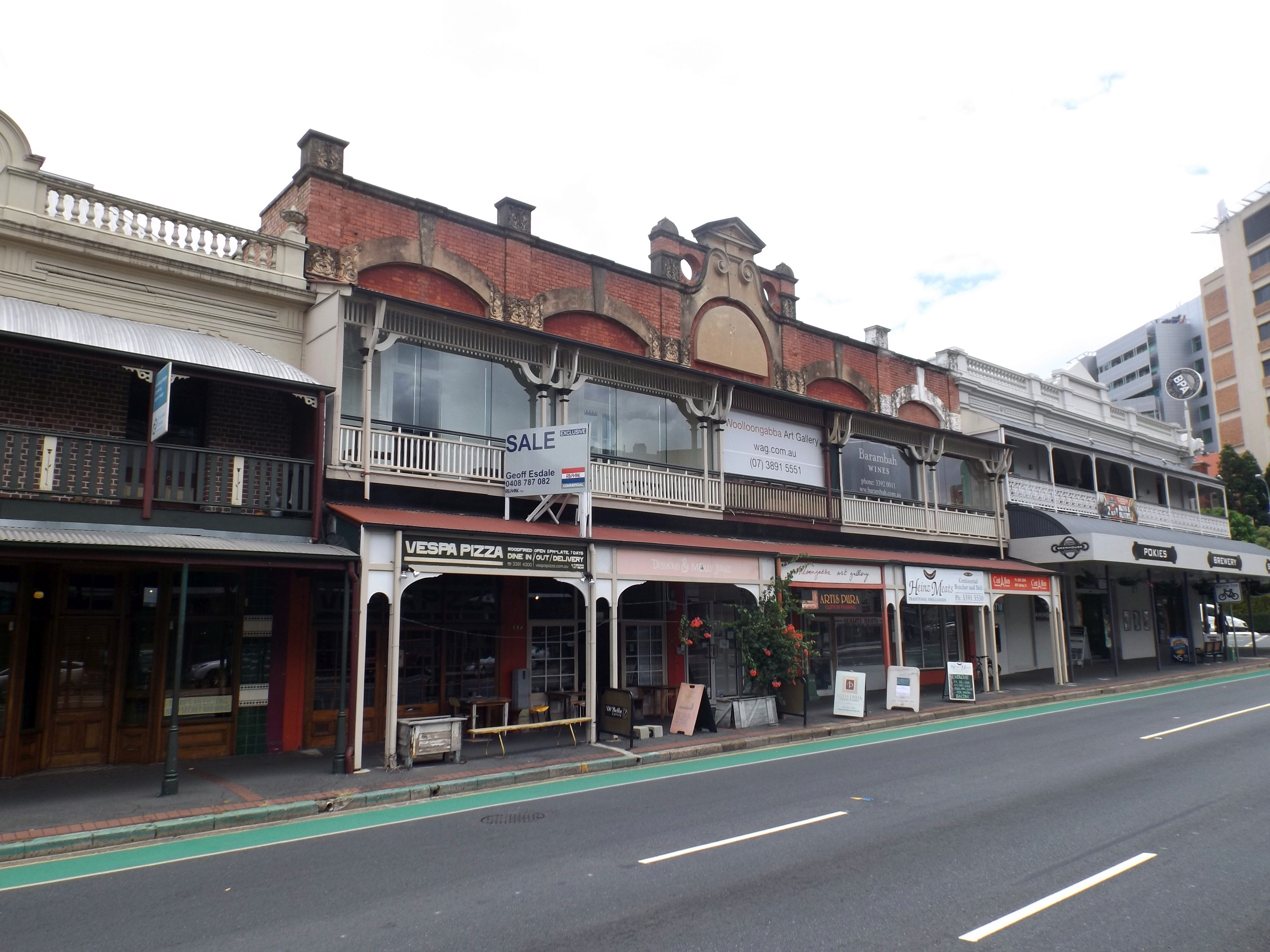
- Building in 2015

- Location within Queensland Location within Australia
- 27.4859°S 153.0295°E
- Location: 609 & 613 Stanley Street, Woolloongabba, City of Brisbane, Queensland, Australia

History
- Design period: 1900–1914 (early 20th century)
- Built: c. 1903

Queensland Heritage Register
- Official name: Shop Row
- Type: state heritage (built)
- Designated: 21 October 1992
- Reference no.: 600355
- Significant period: c. 1903 (fabric) c. 1903–ongoing (historical use)

Shop Row is a heritage-listed commercial building at 609 & 613 Stanley Street, Woolloongabba, City of Brisbane, Queensland, Australia. It was built c. 1903. It was added to the Queensland Heritage Register on 21 October 1992.

== History ==
This two-storeyed brick shop row was built c. 1903, probably for John Brett and Winifred Mary Charlton, owners of the adjoining Clarence Hotel.

Although the site on which the shop row is situated housed a number of small businesses from the 1870s onwards, the land subdivision which permitted construction of the brick shop row did not take place until 1903, following purchase of the Clarence Hotel and the adjoining Stanley Street property by the Charltons in 1902–03.

Its occupants have included fruiterers, hairdressers, tobacconists, drapers, and the Australian Bank of Commerce.

== Description ==
This two-storeyed brick row comprises five shops, with a single skillion roof of corrugated iron sloping down from the front to the back.

A parapet of exposed face brickwork with applied decoration in cement render dominates the Stanley Street facade. The central design element on this parapet is a pediment scroll with plant motifs; in the bays on either side of the scroll, arch forms in cement render are set in relief.

A first floor cantilevered verandah across the front elevation is ornamented with double timber posts, bracket sweeps to three sides of each post, and batten balustrade and frieze. A set of French doors with fanlight opens centrally from each shop onto the verandah.

At the lower level a corrugated iron street awning is supported by double timber posts.

== Heritage listing ==
Shop Row was listed on the Queensland Heritage Register on 21 October 1992 having satisfied the following criteria.

The place is important in demonstrating the evolution or pattern of Queensland's history.

Shop Row at Woolloongabba, erected c. 1903, is important typologically as surviving evidence of Federation-era shop row type in Brisbane, and historically as one of the few surviving commercial buildings of Woolloongabba's early 20th century post-depression recovery. The place is important for its streetscape contribution, and as an integral part of the Clarence Corner precinct, which encapsulates the principal phases of commercial development in Woolloongabba from the 1860s to the 1930s.

The place is important in demonstrating the principal characteristics of a particular class of cultural places.

Shop Row at Woolloongabba, erected c. 1903, is important typologically as surviving evidence of Federation-era shop row type in Brisbane, and historically as one of the few surviving commercial buildings of Woolloongabba's early 20th century post-depression recovery.

The place is important because of its aesthetic significance.

The place is important for its streetscape contribution, and as an integral part of the Clarence Corner precinct, which encapsulates the principal phases of commercial development in Woolloongabba from the 1860s to the 1930s.
