= Woolloongabba =

- Suburb
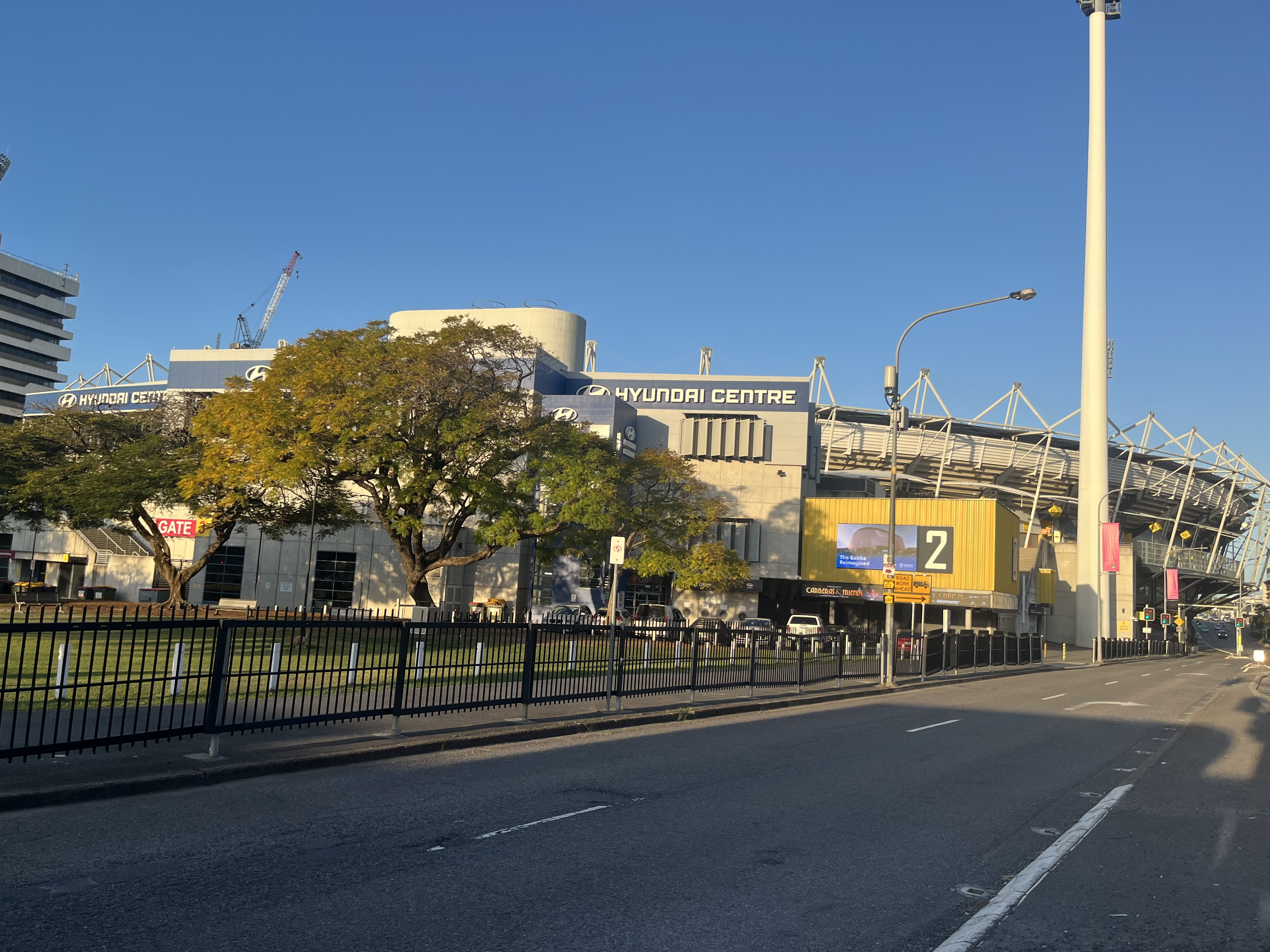
- The Gabba

- Interactive map of Woolloongabba
- Coordinates: 27.4913°S 153.0383°E
- Country: Australia
- State: Queensland
- City: Brisbane
- LGA: City of Brisbane (The Gabba Ward)
- Location: 3.0 km (1.9 mi) SSE of Brisbane CBD

Government
  - State electorate: South Brisbane
  - Federal division: Griffith

Area
  - Total: 2.5 km^{2} (0.97 sq mi)

Population
  - Total: 8,687 (2021 census)
  - Density: 3,470/km^{2} (9,000/sq mi)
- Time zone: UTC+10:00 (AEST)
- Postcode: 4102
Suburbs around Woolloongabba
South Brisbane	Kangaroo Point	East Brisbane
Dutton Park	Woolloongabba	Coorparoo; Stones Corner
Fairfield	Annerley	Greenslopes

Woolloongabba (/wʊlənˈɡæbə/ wuu-lən-GAB-ə) is an inner southern suburb in the City of Brisbane, Queensland, Australia. In the 2021 census, Woolloongabba had a population of 8,687 people.

== Geography ==
Woolloongabba is located 3.0 kilometres (1.9 mi) by road south of the Brisbane GPO. It contains the Brisbane Cricket Ground ('the Gabba') and the Princess Alexandra Hospital. It is crossed by several major roads including the Pacific Motorway, Logan Road and Ipswich Road. The suburb was once home to a large tram depot.

Buranda is a neighbourhood in the south of the suburb (27.5°S 153.0333°E). The name Buranda comes from Yuggera/Kabi/Bundjalung words buran meaning wind and da meaning place.

The Cleveland railway line enters the suburb from the west (Dutton Park) and exits to the east (Coorparoo) with Buranda railway station serving the suburb (27.4965°S 153.0405°E).

== History ==
Experts are divided regarding the Aboriginal meaning of the name, preferring either 'whirling waters' (woolloon and capemm) or 'fight talk place' (woolloon and gabba).

Because the area was low-lying and swampy, it was known as the One Mile Swamp. Although this name appears to be unofficial, it was in common use until the early 1890s.

The site of the current Princess Alexandra Hospital has had a long history, commencing in 1893 as the Diamantina Orphanage (named after Diamantina Bowen, wife of the first Queensland Governor). The first hospital to operate on the site was the Diamantina Hospital for Chronic Diseases from 1901, becoming the South Brisbane Auxiliary Hospital from 1943, then the South Brisbane Hospital from 1956, and then renamed Princess Alexandra Hospital in 1960 (to coincide with the visit of Princess Alexandra to Brisbane).

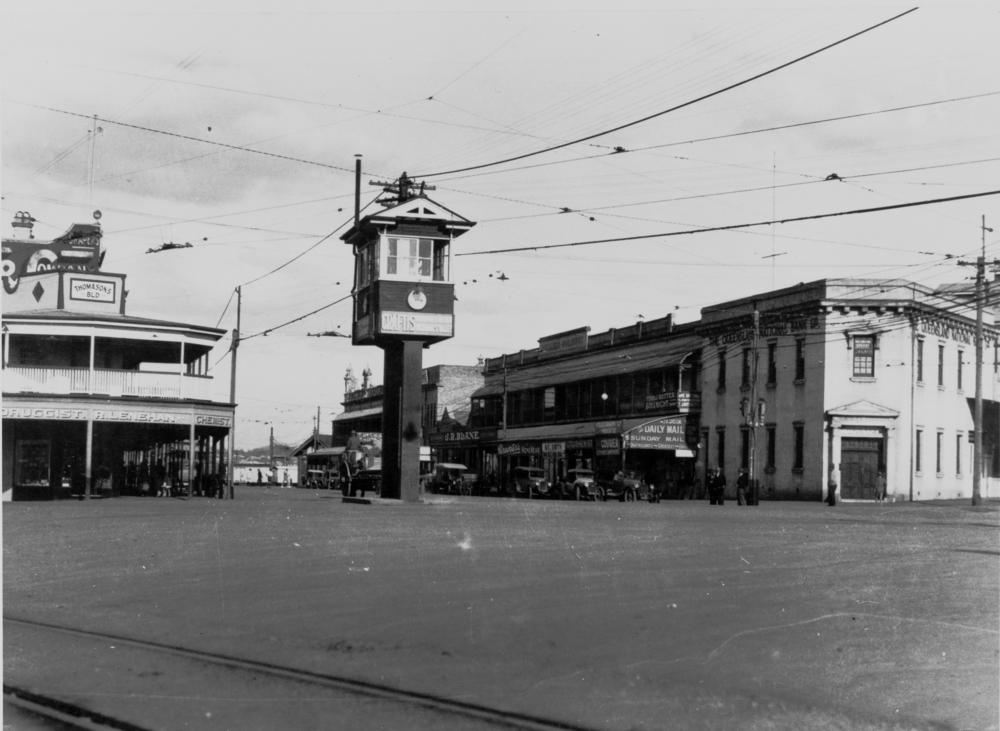
Gabba Fiveways, 1929

The suburb has a significant link to the history of transport in Brisbane. Between 1884 and 1969, the main railway locomotive depot for lines south of the Brisbane River was beside Stanley St. It was reached via a line that ran beside Stanley St, then crossing it, Logan Road and Ipswich Road to the main line at Dutton Park. By the 1960s, services from the depot were causing significant delays to traffic as they crossed these three major roads.

Woolloongabba Mixed State School opened on 1 September 1884. On 5 July 1885, the school was split into it was divided into Woolloongabba Boys State School and Woolloongabba Girls and Infants State School. In 1910, these schools were renamed Dutton Park Boys State School and Dutton Park Girls and Infants State School. In 1935 the two schools were re-united to create Dutton Park State School. In 1995 the Dutton Park Special School was closed as a separate school and became a special education unit within Dutton Park State School. The school is within the neighbouring suburb of Dutton Park.

The suburb was served by horse-drawn trams from 1885 to 1897, which were replaced by electric trams, which in turn ceased operation on 13 April 1969. All but one of Brisbane's trolleybus routes traversed the suburb, from 1953 to 1969. The Woolloongabba Fiveways (the intersection of Stanley Street, Main Street, Logan Road and Ipswich Road) was a complex junction with tram and railway lines, and tram and trolleybus overhead. Trams were controlled by a signalman, who operated the points (or switches) from a signal cabin near the eastern side of the junction. Trains were escorted across the junction by a flagman. Curiously, Queensland Railways always referred to the branch line as the Wooloongabba Branch, spelled with only one 'l'.

In August 1885, "The Deshon Estate" was advertised to be auctioned by Arthur Martin & Co., Auctioneers. A map advertising the auction provided a local sketch of the area. It consisted of approximately 184 allotments and was situated "only a few yards beyond the Woolloongabba Hotel."

In September 1885, the balance of the third and last section of the "Thompson Estate" was advertised for auction by L. J. Markwell. It consisted of approximately 300 allotments, subdivisions of Portion 85, which was bordered by Ipswich Road, Victoria Terrace and Juliette Street. A map advertising the auction provided a local sketch of the area. It also places the estate in Woolloongabba, now considered part of Annerley.

In September 1888, 70 allotments of "The Cremorne Estate" were advertised to be auctioned by W.J. Hooker, auctioneer. A map advertising the auction provided a local sketch of the area. It consisted of approximately 70 allotments, and the land for sale is resubdivisions of subdivision 1 of portion 171, Parish of South Brisbane.

On 1 February 1893, the Brisbane Institution for the Instruction of the Blind, Deaf & Dumb was established on a 10-acre (4.0 ha) site in Cornwall Street. By the end of 1893, 22 students were enrolled. On 4 February 1963, a separate school for blind students was established in Buranda as Narbethong School for the Blind, using the building previously occupied by the then-closed Buranda Infants School. It was later renamed Narbethong State Special School and moved to its current site in Salisbury Street in 1969. Deaf students continued to attend school at Cornwall Street which was then known as Queensland School for the Deaf, until it closed on 9 December 1988 and the deaf students transferred to mainstream schools.

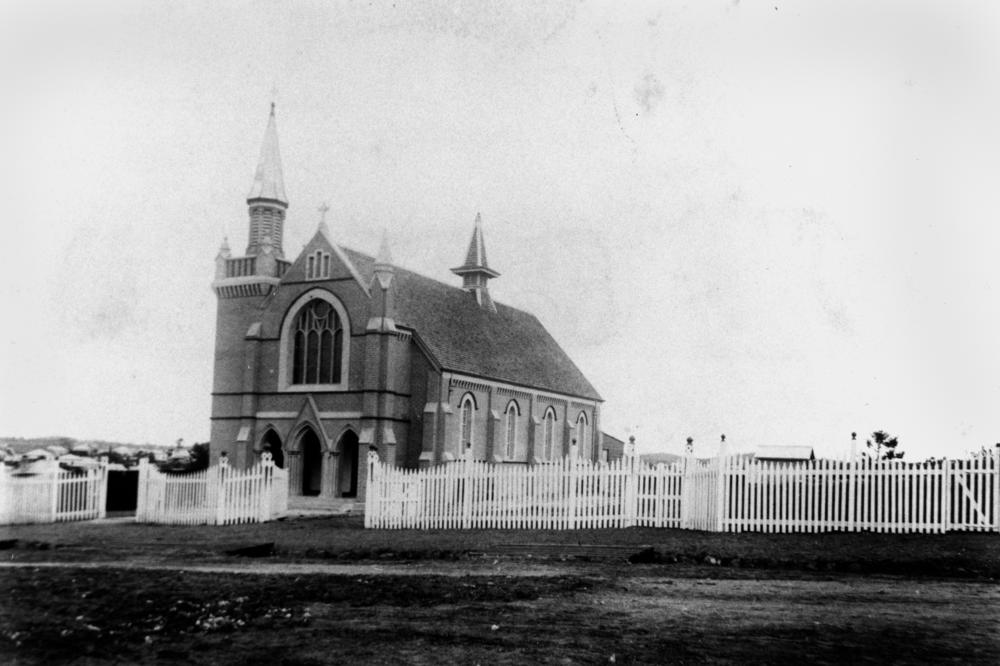
Nazareth Lutheran Church at Woolloongabba, 1896

On Saturday 12 October 1895, the foundation stone was laid for the Nazareth Lutheran Church in Hawthorne Road by Henry Norman, the Governor of Queensland. The church was to replace the congregation's existing church in South Brisbane, which was an old timber church in a location no longer convenient to the congregation. On Sunday 10 May 1896, the new church was opened and consecrated. It was built of brick (both inside and outside) in a Gothic design. The building was 62 by 32 feet (18.9 by 9.8 m) with a vestibule and chancel. It has a bell tower and spire on the front northern face. The architect was Charles McLay and the contractor W. Taylor.

The meeting house of the Church of Jesus Christ of Latter-day Saints in Australia opened on 4 December 1904 at 17 Gibbon Street. It remained in use until 3 August 1958, followed by the opening of a new meeting house at Kangaroo Point (now the site of the Brisbane Temple).

On 4 March 1918, Buranda Girls and Infants State School was opened, followed on 27 September 1920 by the opening of Buranda Boys School. The girls and infants were separated into Buranda State Infants School and Buranda Girls State School on 30 January 1934. In 1963, the girls' and infants' schools were reunited to re-establish Buranda Girls and Infants State School. In 1967, Buranda State School was established combining the schools for the boys and the girls and infants.

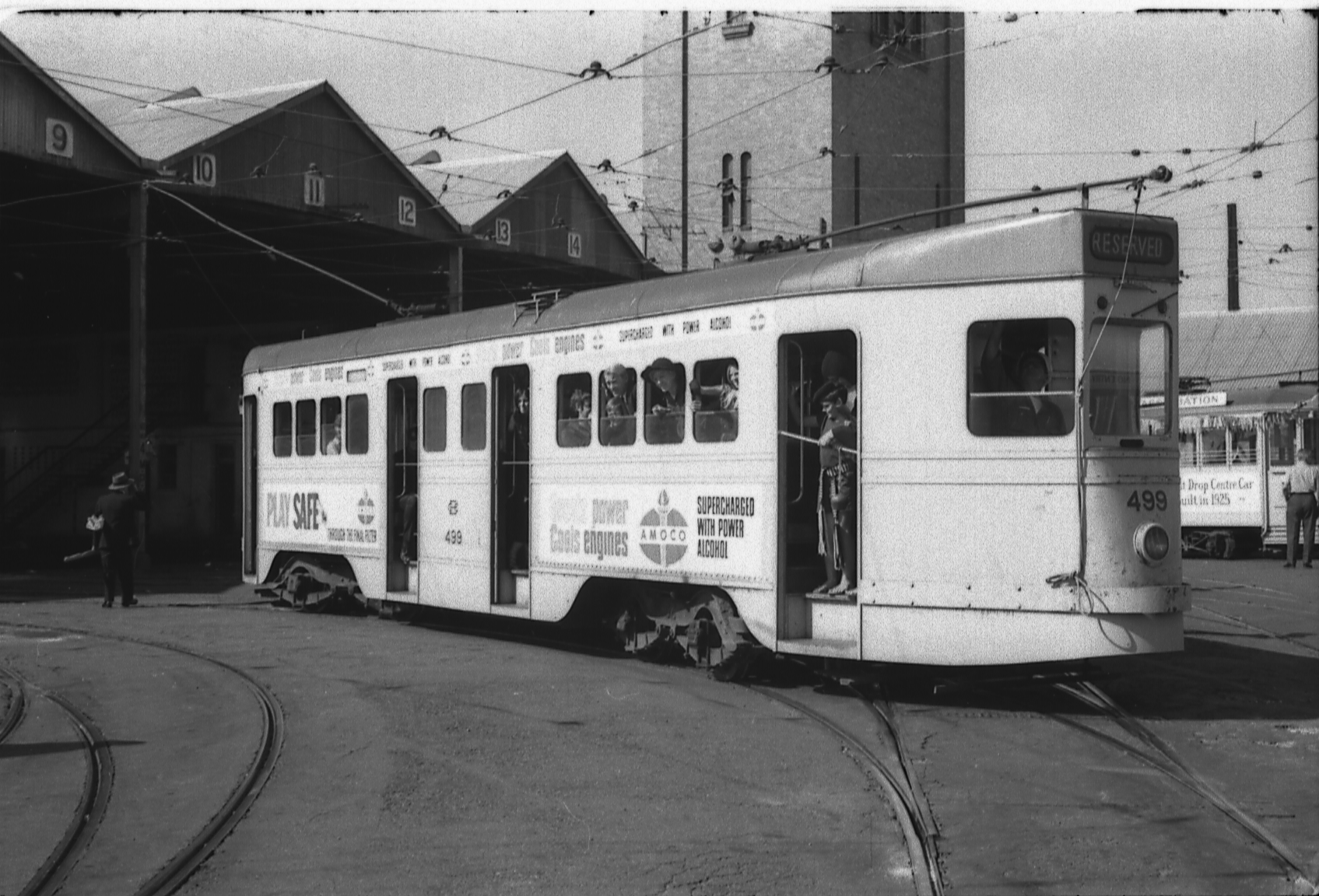
Tram No 499 ready to leave the Ipswich Road Depot, 1969

From 1927 until 1969, the largest of the Brisbane City Council's tram depots was on Ipswich Road between Cornwall Street and Tottenham Street (27.5005°S 153.0358°E), opposite the Princess Alexandra Hospital, now the site of the Buranda Village shopping centre. This tram depot was also used by the council's buses.

On Sunday 20 December 1936, Archbishop James Duhig laid the foundation stone for St Luke the Evangelist's Catholic Church on the site of the Barco Villa at Buranda (as that area was then known). On Sunday 11 April 1937 the Apostolic Delegate in Australia, Giovanni Panico, officially opened the new church in the presence of thousands of people. The church was built in the Spanish Mission style at a cost of about £3500. Although the church had a bell tower, the builder warned against installing the bell, fearing it would cause problems with the structural integrity of the church. The church was severely damaged in a hail storm in November 2014 and was officially closed on 28 December 2014. A 30-month project was then undertaken to refurbish the church, finally install the bell, and build a retirement village, St Luke's Green, on land surrounding the church. On Sunday 10 September 2017, St Luke's was officially re-dedicated by Archbishop Mark Coleridge and the retirement village blessed and officially opened.

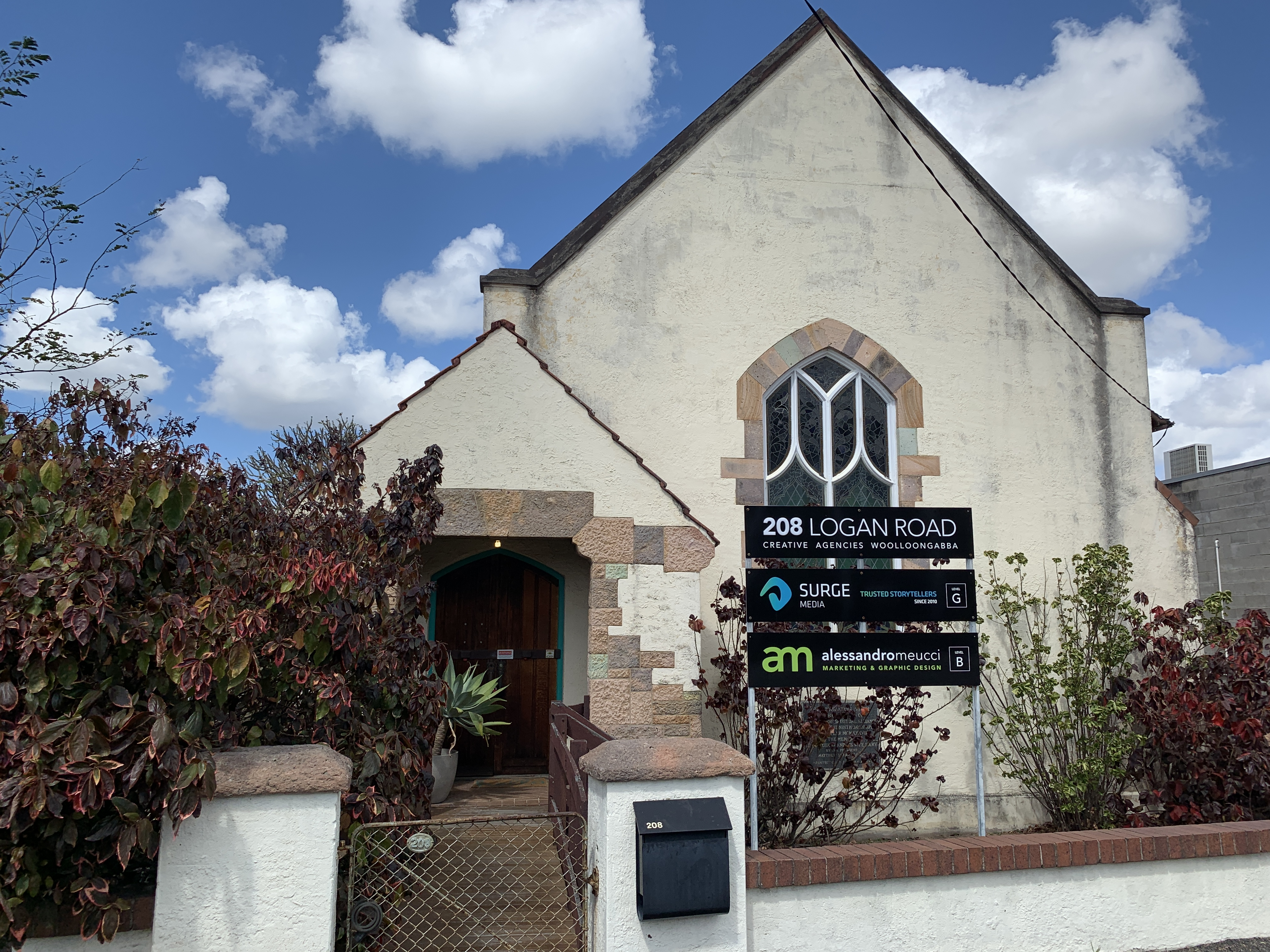
Brisbane Christian Spiritual Alliance Church (former), 2020

On 9 April 1938, the foundation stone of the Brisbane Spiritual Alliance Church was laid at 208 Logan Road (27.4948°S 153.0416°E). It was dedicated to the memory of George Coxon and his wife Mary who bequeathed two blocks of land and £2000 to the Church which they had established in 1924 following a split with another spiritualist church, after which they met in a building made of galvanised iron in Buranda. The architect was E. P. Trewern. The church was opened on Sunday 10 July 1938. A window in the western wall memorialised George Coxon. The church was still operating in 1990, but, as at 2020, is used as commercial premises.

In early 1942, the first Coca-Cola bottling plant in Australia was built in Woolloongabba at 36-39 Balaclava Street. It was originally designed to supply the demands of the newly arrived US military personnel, but later expanded production to the local Australian market.

On Sunday 20 June 1948, Archbishop James Duhig laid the foundation stone for St Luke's Catholic Primary School. On Sunday 23 January 1949, Duhig officially opened and blessed the new school designed for 200 students. The school was located on the O'Keefe Street side of the church and was operated by the Presentation Sisters. The school closed in 1977.

Buranda Senior Special School opened at 21 Martin Street with the grounds of Buranda State School (27.4964°S 153.0424°E) on 23 January 1967. it closed on 24 May 1996.

In early 2013, the congregation known over time as the Vulture Street Baptist Church, South Brisbane Baptist Church and South Bank Baptist Church relocated from their church at 128 Vulture Street (corner of Christie Street), South Brisbane, to a new site at 859 Stanley Street, Woolloongabba (27.4872°S 153.0393°E), renaming itself as Church@TheGabba.

== Demographics ==
In the 2016 census, Woolloongabba had a population of 5,631 people. 51.3% of people were born in Australia. The next most common countries of birth were China 3.8%, New Zealand 3.5%, England 2.7%, South Korea 2.7% and India 2.5%. 59.2% of people spoke only English at home. Other languages spoken at home included Mandarin 5.9%, Vietnamese 2.7%, Korean 2.4% and Spanish 2.3%. The most common responses for religion were No Religion 42.2% and Catholic 15.2%.

In the 2021 census, Woolloongabba had a population of 8,687 people.

== Heritage listings ==
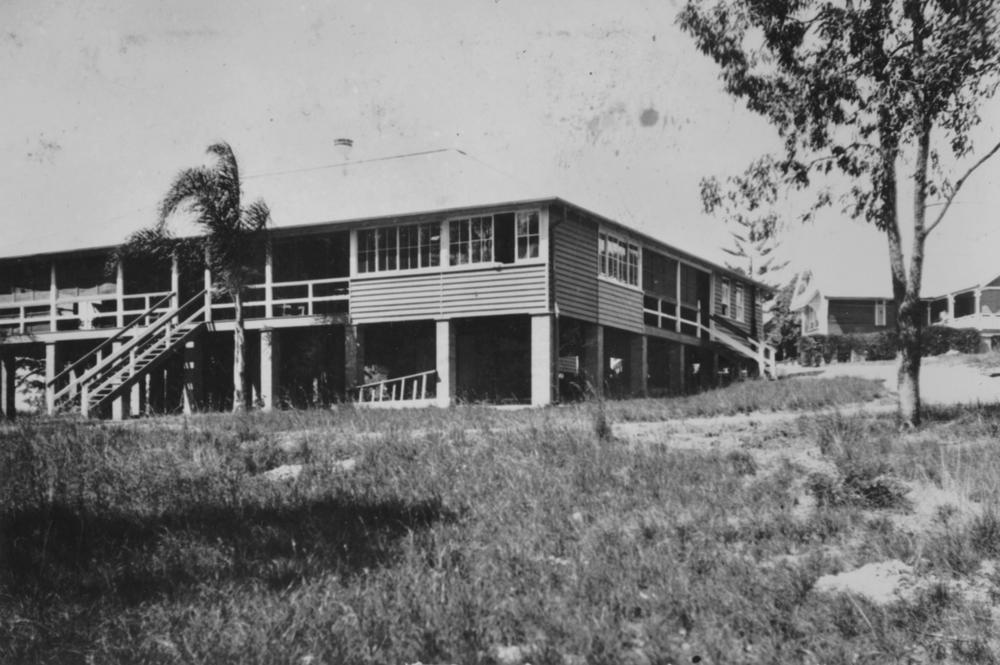
Diamantina Hospital for Chronic Diseases, 1920

Woolloongabba has a number of heritage-listed sites, including:

- 8 Annerley Road: Princess Theatre (also known as South Brisbane Public Hall, Boggo Road Theatre)
- 38 Annerley Road: Bethany Gospel Hall (also known as Bethany Hall)
- 83 Annerley Road: Burke's Hotel (also known as The Red Brick)
- 36 Broadway Street: Ukrainian Catholic Church & Presbytery
- 49 Broadway Street: former Spanish Speaking Baptist Church (also known as Broadway Congregational Church)
- Cornwall Street: former Dispenser's House of Diamantina Hospital (also known as Diamantina Health Care Museum)
- 12–24 Cowley Street: Buranda State School
- 12 Hawthorne Street: Nazareth Lutheran Church & Sunday School (also known as Nazareth Lutheran Church of South Brisbane)
- 52 Hawthorne Street: Wilbar (flats)
- 60 Hawthorne Street: St Seraphim Russian Orthodox Church (also known as Dalma)
- 68 Hawthorne Street: Holy Trinity Anglican Church
- 23 Heaslop Street: Wilhelm's Hoehe (house, also known as Papanui)
- 5 Hubert Street: R.A.O.B. Lodge Hall (also known as St. Joseph's Hibernian Hall)
- 102 Ipswich Road: Norman Hotel
- 207A Ipswich Road: City Electric Lights Company Substation No.3 (also known as South Brisbane Transformer Station)
- 264 Ipswich Road: Buranda Ventilation Shaft
- 10–14 Logan Road: former Taylor–Heaslop Building (also known as People's Cash Store, grocers, J.R. Blane, grocer & hardware merchant, Moreton Rubber Works, John Evan's Cash Draper, George Logan Draper, Johns & Co. Draper, Ernest Reid, Draper)
- 23 Logan Road: former Baby Clinic
- 28 Logan Road: Federation-era shop
- 45 Logan Road: City Electric Light Substation No.5
- 93 Logan Road: Broadway Hotel
- 208 Logan Road: Brisbane Christian Spiritual Alliance Church
- 842–848 Main Street: former Woolloongabba Police Station
- 46 Maynard Street: Merrilands (villa, also known as Hambergvil)
- 49 Maynard Street: Radford House
- Merton Road (27.4880°S 153.0304°E): Retaining wall east (between Hawthorne & Peterson St)
- 18 Merton Road: The Duke of Clarence Lodge, MUIOOF (also known as Protestant Hall)
- 45 Merton Road: Carininya (house)
- 55 Merton Road: Merton Road Cottages
- 264 Ipswich Road (27.5004°S 153.0354°E): former Route 31 Ipswich Road Tram Shelter
- 36 Oxford Street: OES Hall (also known as Harriers Hall)
- 8 Ross Street: Serbian Orthodox Church (also known as Merton Street Primitive Methodist Church)
- 588 Stanley Street: former Magee's Drapery Emporium
- 596 Stanley Street: Shops
- 601 Stanley Street: Clarence Corner Hotel (also known as The Newton)
- 609 & 613 Stanley Street: Shop Row
- 615 Stanley Street: Hillyards Shop House
- 617–619 Stanley Street: Pollock's Shop House
- 640 Stanley Street: Morrison Hotel (also known as Brittania)
- 647 Stanley Street: Phoenix Buildings (also known as Malouf's Fashion House)
- 659 Stanley Street: Langford–Ely Pawnbroker's Shop
- 663 Stanley Street: Short's Building
- 667 Stanley Street: Oswald Flohrer & Co.
- 735 Stanley Street: Railway Hotel (also known as Recovery Hotel, Chalk Hotel)
- 765 Stanley Street: former Woolloongabba Post Office
- 767 Stanley Street: former Brisbane Associated Friendly Society Dispensary
- 779 Stanley Street: former Tacey & Co. Shop
- 34 Sword Street: Woolloongabba Air Raid Shelter
- 43 Taylor Street: St Luke's Catholic Church

== Education ==
Buranda State School is a government primary (Prep–6) school for boys and girls at 24 Cowley Street (27.4971°S 153.0426°E). In 2018, the school had an enrolment of 247 students with 20 teachers (14 full-time equivalent) and 10 non-teaching staff (8 full-time equivalent).

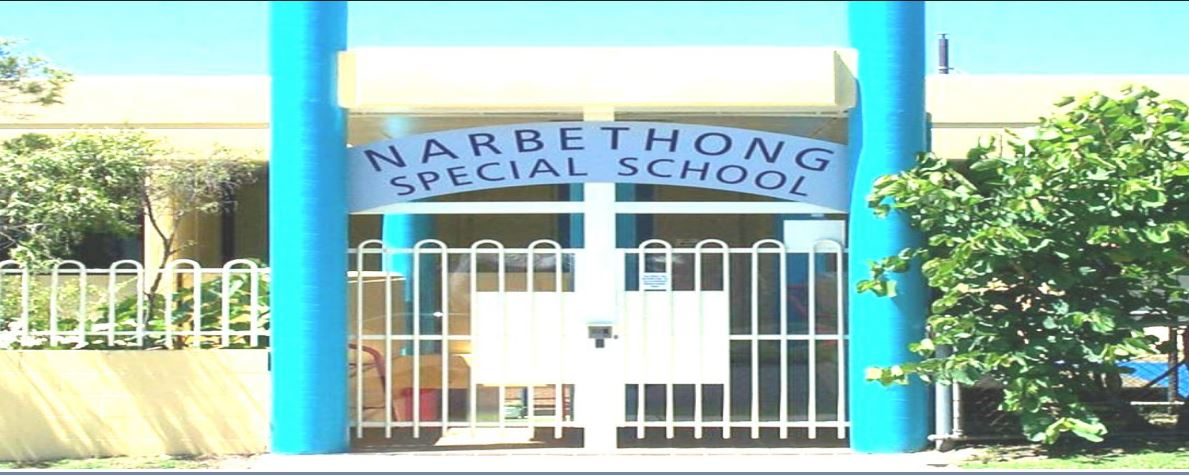
Narbethong State Special School, 2021

Narbethong State Special School is a government special primary and secondary (Early Childhood to Year 12) school for boys and girls at 25 Salisbury Street (27.4957°S 153.0447°E). The school specialises in education for students with impaired vision. In 2018, the school had an enrolment of 57 students with 38 teachers (32 full-time equivalent) and 60 non-teaching staff (35 full-time equivalent).

There are no mainstream government secondary schools in Woolloongabba. The nearest government secondary schools are Brisbane State High School in neighbouring South Brisbane to the north-west, Coorparoo Secondary College in neighbouring Coorparoo to the west, and the new Brisbane South State Secondary College in neighbouring Dutton Park to the west.

The 2021 initial intake at Brisbane South State Secondary College was Year 7 students only, with each successive calendar year extending the range of school years on offer until 2026 when the full Years 7–12 schooling will be provided. Until that time, another option for schooling to Year 12 is Yeronga State High School in Yeronga to the south.

== Facilities ==
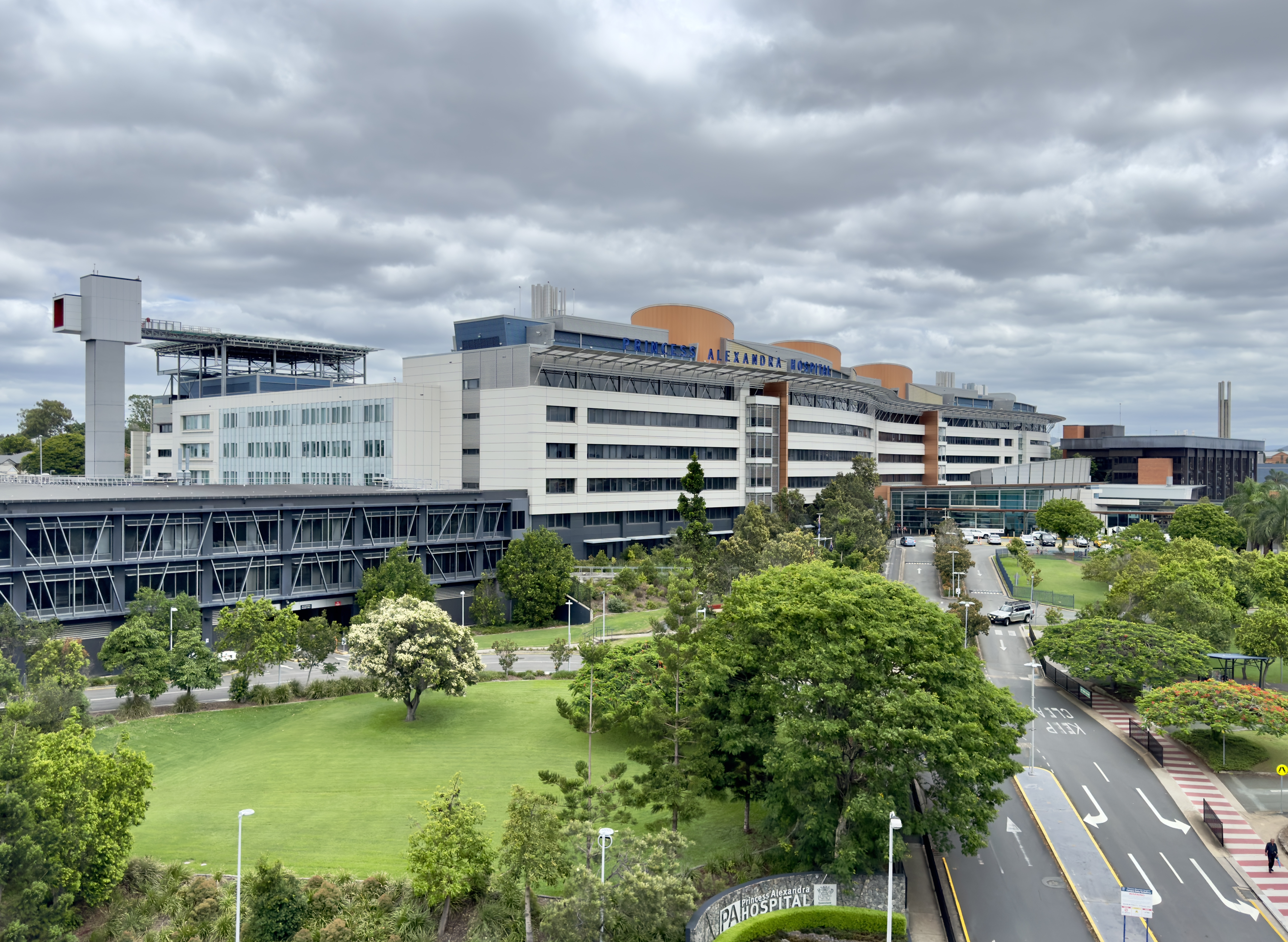
Main building of Princess Alexandra Hospital, 2024

Princess Alexandra Hospital (often abbreviated to PA Hospital) is at 199 Ipswich Road (27.4989°S 153.0333°E). It is a public tertiary hospital, providing care for adults in most medical specialties. The hospital has expertise in trauma management and organ transplants. It has an emergency department.

The head office of the Queensland Justices Association is located in Woolloongabba.

== Places of worship ==
Woolloongabba is home to a number of places of worship, including:

- Serbian Orthodox Church of Saint Nicholas (Ross Street)
- Holy Trinity Anglican Church (Hawthorne Street)
- Finnish Lutheran Church in Brisbane (Hawthorne Street)
- Holy Annunciation Orthodox Church (Park Road)
- Protection of the Mother of God Ukrainian Catholic Church (Broadway Street)
- New Apostolic Church (Qualtrough Street)
- Darul Uloom Islamic Academy of Brisbane (Agnes Street)
- South Brisbane Seventh-day Adventist Church (O'Keefe Street)
- St Luke's Catholic Church, 47 Taylor Street (27.4942°S 153.0383°E)
- Nazareth Lutheran Church, 12 Hawthorne Street (27.4887°S 153.0346°E)

== Sport and recreation ==
The suburb is home to the Brisbane Cricket Ground, commonly known as "the Gabba".

Angelika Cinemas, a subsidiary of Reading Cinemas, has a branch in Woolloongabba.

== Attractions ==
The Norman Hotel is a local landmark that has served customers since 1890.

== Transport ==
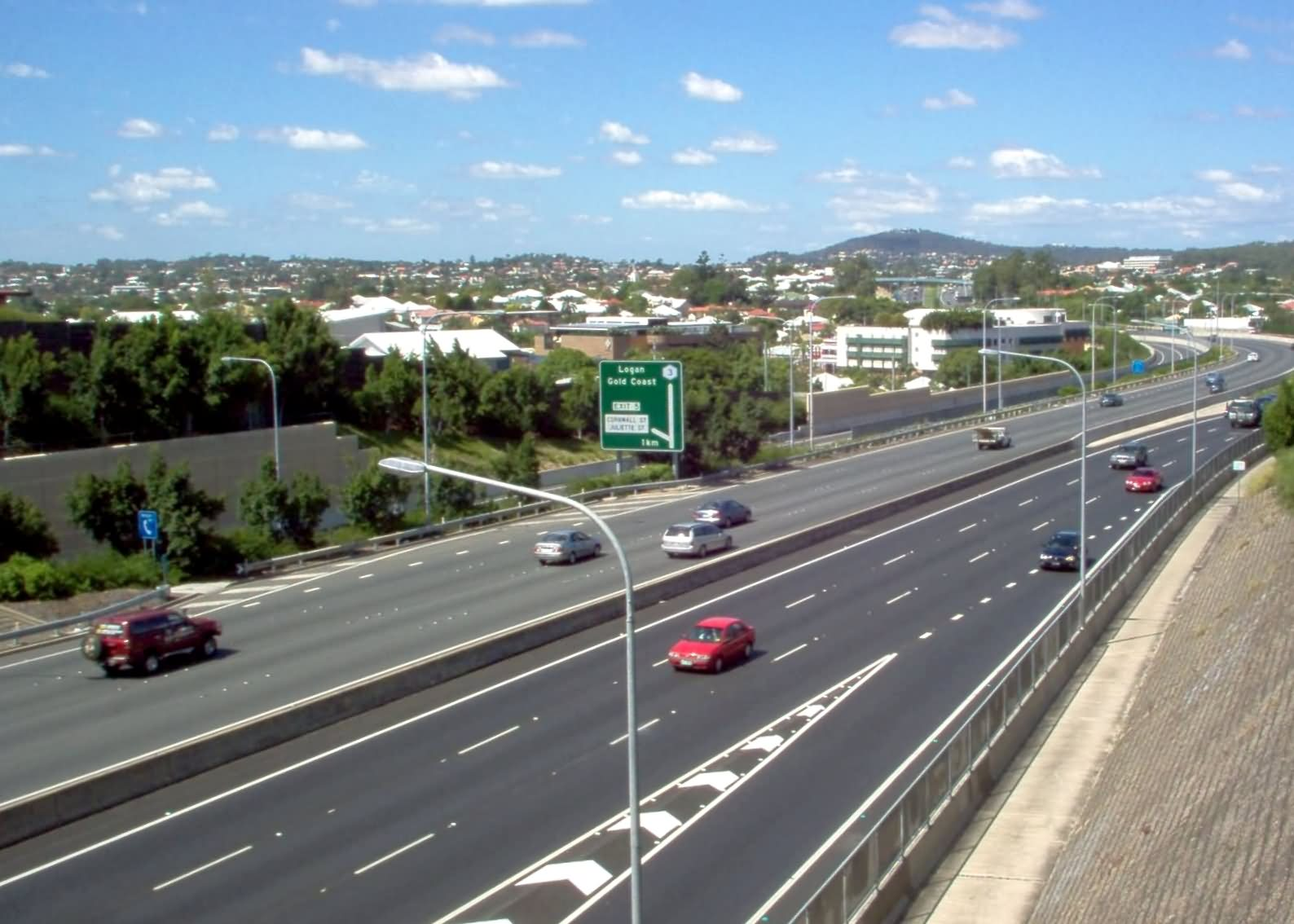
The Pacific Motorway in Woolloongabba, 2006

The Pacific Motorway cuts through the suburb with an exit south into Vulture Street and a Stanley Street exit for vehicles heading north. Additionally, there is an entrance to the Clem Jones Tunnel in the suburb on Ipswich road.

=== Public transport ===
Queensland Rail trains service the suburb with stops at Boggo Road and Buranda. The South East Busway also runs through Woolloongabba, with stops at Woolloongabba busway station and Buranda busway station. The high-frequency Maroon CityGlider bus service also stops here.
