= Woolloongabba Fiveways =

Intersection of 5 major roads at Woolloongabba, Brisbane

Coordinates: 27.4864°S 153.0360°E

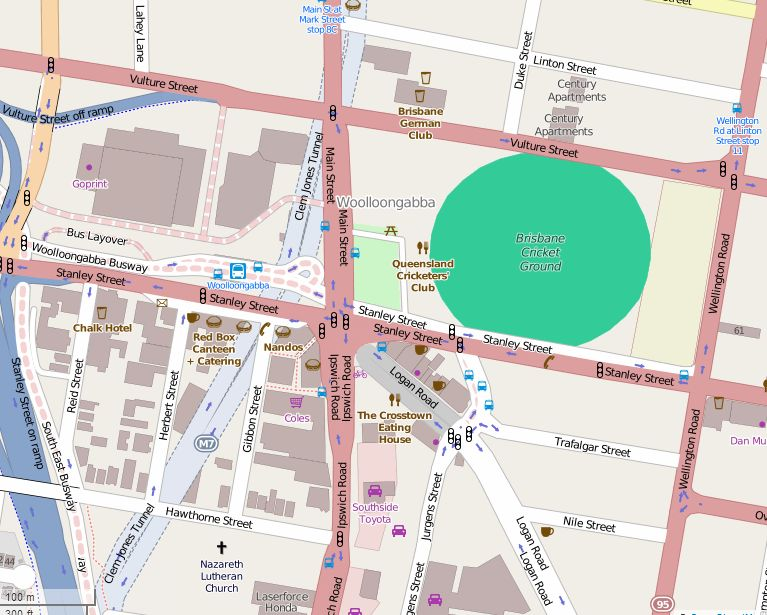
Woolloongabba Fiveways, 2014

The Woolloongabba Fiveways is the intersection of 5 major roads at Woolloongabba, Brisbane, Queensland, Australia. The intersection gives its name to the surrounding commercial area.

== Geography ==
The intersection consists of:

- to the north: Main Street leading to Kangaroo Point and the Story Bridge
- to the west: Stanley Street leading to South Brisbane
- to the east: Stanley Street, where it is known as Stanley Street East, leading to Brisbane's eastern suburbs and eventually to Cleveland and Moreton Bay
- to the south-east: Logan Road, leading to Brisbane's southern suburbs and eventually to the Logan River and City of Logan
- to the south: Ipswich Road, leading to Brisbane's south-western suburbs and eventually to Ipswich

The Woolloongabba Railway Yards were once located on the corner of Main Street and Stanley Street (north-west of the Fiveways); the Woolloongabba busway station is there today. The Gabba sporting grounds are located to the north-east of the Fiveways (on the block at the corner of Main Street and Stanley Street East).

== History ==
The intersection of Brisbane's major roads on the southern side of the Brisbane River is of the major intersections in Brisbane's history with the first track to Ipswich (now Ipswich Road) established in the 1840s.

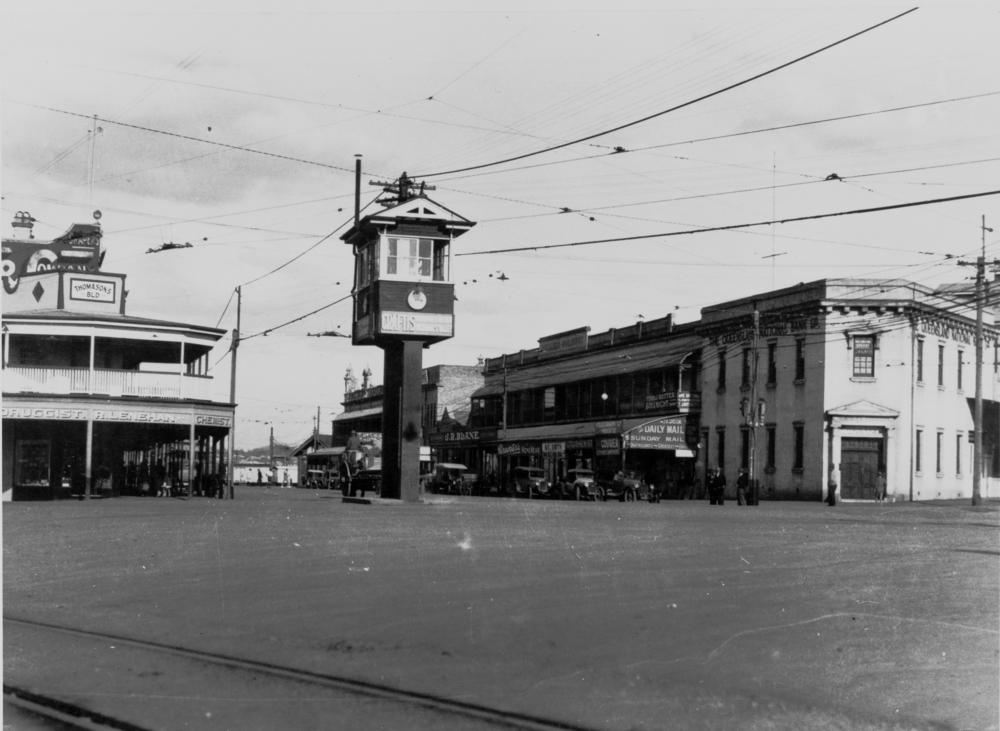
Signalman's box with Logan Road behind, Woolloongabba Fiveways, circa 1929

The Woolloongabba Railway Station constructed in 1887 with the associated railway yards being built in 1900. The Wooloongabba Branch railway line passed through the intersection until the closure of the yards and lines in the late 1960s. As tram routes also ran through the intersection, the management of 5 major road routes with car and buses, plus trams and trains travelling on their own tracks through the intersection made it Brisbane's busiest intersection. A signalman's box was in the centre of the intersection to manage the transit of trains through the intersection.
