= Broadway Hotel, Woolloongabba =

Broadway Hotel
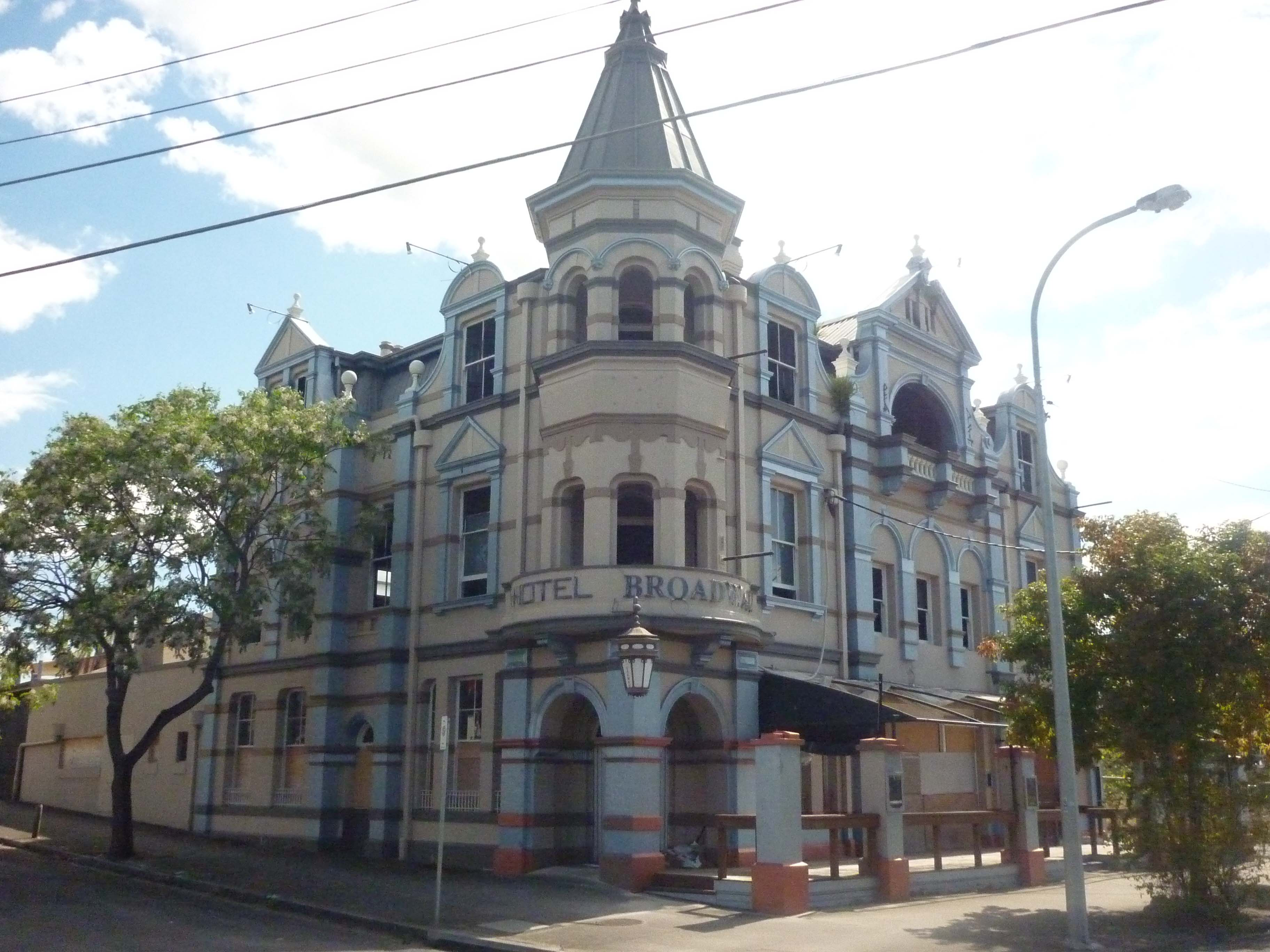
- Broadway Hotel, 2012

- Location within Queensland Location within Australia
- 27.4899°S 153.0384°E
- Location: 93 Logan Road, Woolloongabba, City of Brisbane, Queensland, Australia

History
- Design period: 1870s–1890s (late 19th century)
- Built: 1890

Site notes
- Architect(s): John Hall & Son

Queensland Heritage Register
- Official name: Broadway Hotel
- Type: state heritage (built)
- Designated: 21 October 1992
- Reference no.: 600354
- Historical Period: 1870s–1890s Late 19th century
- Builders: Wooley & Whyte

Broadway Hotel is a heritage-listed hotel at 93 Logan Road, Woolloongabba, City of Brisbane, Queensland, Australia. It was added to the Queensland Heritage Register on 21 October 1992. Damaged in fires in 2010 , 2018, and 2026, the building has undergone stabilisation works but remains damaged and unused.

== History ==
The Broadway Hotel, Woolloongabba was built in 1890 during a period of major growth in Queensland’s economy, population, and construction. It operated as a privately-owned commercial hotel until its closure due to a fire in 2010. In 2018, it was heavily damaged in a second fire and remains closed.

The area now known as Woolloongabba is part of the traditional country of the Jagera and Turrbal People. Following European occupation, it was called One Mile Swamp due to a series of large waterholes stretching for a mile between what is now Stanley and Vulture streets. The roads from the Logan and Darling Downs districts converged there and in the 1850s bullock drays and livestock were rested at the waterholes. By the 1860s some of the waterholes had been drained and a fledgling commercial precinct emerged. The name, Woolloongabba, replaced One Mile Swamp in the 1870s.

Queensland experienced an economic boom beginning in the 1870s and peaking in the late 1880s before growth slowed dramatically in the early 1890s due to a series of economic setbacks. During the boom, Queensland travel routes and services, particularly railways, were expanded, stimulating growth in industries, increasing the availability of consumer goods and construction materials, and spurring closer settlement, particularly in Brisbane. Trams were introduced as a form of public transport in Brisbane in the mid-1880s and expanded rapidly, shaping the development of the city’s suburbs.

Many new hotels were built in the 1880s to service the increased size and mobility of the Queensland population. In the late 19th century, hotels (licensed drinking establishments that also provided lodging) were key venues for social interaction. They provided a vital service for travellers, pastoralists, workers, and others moving around the colony, and were typically located on or near major travel routes or services. Queensland’s many late 19th to early 20th century hotels shared characteristics, including being located prominently in growing urban or suburban areas, serviced by transport routes and amenities. They were typically two- or three-storey, loadbearing brick and timber-framed structures with a grand form, architectural style, and elaborate detailing, designed to attract public attention. The interior functions included public hospitality amenities, such as public bars, lounges, dining rooms, bedrooms, and ablutions, serviced by back of house rooms, such as cellars, store rooms, kitchens, and laundries.

In the 1880s, Woolloongabba developed quickly, together with the adjoining suburbs of East Brisbane, Buranda, and Stones Corner, following the expansion of the railway and tramway systems and the growth of associated commerce and light industry. In 1881 a dry dock was established at South Brisbane and the nearby coal wharves were linked to a railway goods yard at Woolloongabba in 1884. The first (horse drawn) trams in Brisbane ran between Woolloongabba and Newstead in 1885 and had reached Buranda by 1887. South Brisbane and Woolloongabba were amalgamated to form the City of South Brisbane in 1888 and in the following year the first Post Office opened in Woolloongabba and was serviced by tram. The area was booming, as was the Queensland economy generally. It was within this buoyant context that Brisbane publican Michael McKenna bought land in Woolloongabba and built his substantial Broadway Hotel to a design by John Hall & Son.

John Hall & Son was a successful, Brisbane-based architecture firm, operating from 1883 until 1896. The firm was extremely busy during the 1880s, designing more than 100 buildings in the late 1880s alone, but work lessened after the economic downturn of the early 1890s. Led by principal Francis Richard Hall, the firm employed a number of talented architects, including John Smith Murdoch from the late 1880s to 1893. The firm’s designs were primarily for Brisbane buildings, mostly residences and villas; likely the firm’s most prominent and notable design was the South Brisbane Municipal Chambers (QHR 600306), designed in c1890, and its construction completed in 1892 to considerable fanfare. During the same period, the firm completed designs for at least nine Brisbane hotels, one of which was the Broadway Hotel, possibly by Murdoch.

The Broadway Hotel was constructed by local contractors Wooley and White, with their £4820 tender accepted in September 1889. The hotel’s Woolloongabba site, bounded by Logan Road, Short Street, and Balaclava Street, had been transferred to McKenna in January that year. Its location at the intersection of major arterial roads was prominent, and well serviced by the tram line which ran along Logan Road. John Hall & Son’s design was an imposing structure to attract attention, and when completed and opened in 1890 it rapidly became a well-known local landmark.

The Broadway Hotel was a substantial, three-storey, brick hotel in an elaborate Late-Victorian style, described as Queen Anne Revival. Its two street facades were highly decorative, featuring polychrome face brick walls with elaborately moulded terracotta dressings, balconies, parapets, a mansard roof, and an octagonal corner tower with tall, peaked roof. It included a single-storey, rear service wing extending along Short Street with a cast-iron post and lace balustrade verandah facing the street. The wing’s original interior layout and function are not known, but was likely one or two small rooms (kitchen and scullery). It is possible the building included a second rear wing, although its size and functions are not known, and is only confirmed to be here by 1915.

McKenna operated the hotel until the end of 1899, when he leased the hotel to a succession of licensees, and he sold it in 1917.

An air-raid shelter was constructed in the rear yard in 1943. The hotel was refurbished in the late-1950s, including altering room layouts, enclosing balconies, cutting new openings in walls, and closing others, building toilets and a cold room, and adding new finishes. Plans of this work show the second rear wing at this time to be a two-storey, brick wing with hip roof. Its ground floor layout and large fireplace indicate it was possibly an early kitchen and/or laundry and two adjacent, smaller rooms, possibly scullery and storeroom. The first floor, which was at a different level to that of the main block, had a layout and room sizes which were domestic, possibly servants’ or manager’s living rooms. Connecting this wing and the hotel’s main block was a semi-enclosed stair down to the rear yard. The plans also show a two-storey, rear verandah (with cast iron posts at ground level), which ran along the rear of the main block, likely built in 1890. It was demolished as part of the late 1950s work. Further refurbishment work was completed in 1960 and 1962. Also at this time, the hotel’s stables in the rear yard were demolished. In the mid-1980s the hotel underwent a program of refurbishment, alterations, and additions. By this time, the external face brick walls had been painted.

In 1997, the hotel passed into new ownership. In July 2010, while renovations were underway, a fire occurred at the hotel causing extensive damage, and the hotel ceased operation. Still closed, a second major fire occurred in the hotel in September 2018, causing greater damage. The 2018 fire attracted considerable public, political and media interest about the building’s future, following a long period of being unoccupied and subject to vandalism. This included community meetings and petitions to both State and local government to protect the building. After the fire, the hotel’s structure was stabilised, and debris cleanup occurred. The air-raid shelter, found to be structurally unsound, and other, more-recent structures were demolished by 2020. In 2022 a further change in ownership occurred.

In 2024, the hotel remains vacant and fire damaged.

In January 2026, the building was further damaged by fire.

== Description ==
The Broadway Hotel is a substantial brick building occupying a prominent corner site in Woolloongabba bounded by the main thoroughfare Logan Road to its northeast, a closed section of road reserve (originally Short Street) to its southeast, Balaclava Street to its southwest (rear), and commercial properties to its northwest side. The building is vacant and bears major fire damage.

The building comprises three parts. A three-storey main block (1890) with part basement stands at the corner of the site with elaborate facades fronting Logan Road and the former Short Street. Extending off its rear are two rectangular wings: a single-storey service wing with basement (1890); and a two-storey wing (by 1915, possibly original or incorporating original fabric).

Main Block (1890)

The main block has loadbearing brick walls and interior partitions, timber-framed floors for its rooms, and suspended concrete floors for balconies. The block is roofless, its timber-framed mansard roof and the tower’s spire roof, both clad with metal sheets, have been destroyed in the fires.

The street-facing facades of the hotel’s main block are in an elaborate Late Victorian era style (Queen Anne Revival), featuring multiple pedimented bays, balconies, and an octagonal corner tower over the main entrance. The original polychrome face brick with tuck pointing has been rendered over and painted, and moulded terracotta dressings (string courses, cornices, cappings, balcony balusters, and finials) have been painted over, or demolished (likely 1958). A large, original glass lantern is mounted to the corner tower of the building. The main block’s rear and side facades, originally plain, lime-pencilled face brick, have been rendered and painted. Most external timber joinery has been lost to the fires, including its doors and windows; however, some remnants survive. A modern timber ground floor deck and lightweight roof structure have been attached to the Logan Road facade.

The interior on all floor levels is fire damaged, and has lost original fabric, including lime plaster wall finishes and cornices, lath-and-plaster ceilings, fireplace surrounds, and moulded timber joinery, such as skirtings, architraves, doors, and the main stair, except for a fragment of stair landing at the second floor level.

The ground floor layout, which is not intact, comprises a large public bar room on the principal corner of the building, smaller surrounding rooms, and a rear stair hall. The ground floor balcony fronting Logan Road has had its wall demolished to extend the interior. The ground floor’s original, timber-framed floors have been altered in many areas by the addition of later surfaces including concrete topping slabs.

The first floor layout is considerably intact, comprising a central, L-shaped corridor with rooms opening on either side; however, the walls of the balconies have been demolished to extend the interior. The original floor structure of the first floor generally survives throughout, comprising steel beams on sandstone blocks within the brick walls supporting herringbone strutted timber joists; and areas of original floor boards survive. Some remnants of original moulded skirting, and a double-hung window also survive.

The second floor, originally largely identical to the first floor, is not intact due to the complete loss of its floor and roof; however, most of its masonry partitions survive. Its original Logan Road-facing balcony survives relatively intact. As post-fire stabilising measures, a suspended concrete slab and steel struts have been added to the interior.

The basement, reached via timber stairs through an access hatch in the floor of the public bar, is one room with cast iron posts supporting the steel beam and timber joists floor framing of the ground floor. Two grated lightwells in the former Short Street footpath open into the basement.

Single-Storey Service Wing (1890)

The single-storey service wing is not intact. At its core is the original small, rectangular, wing, with brick walls and timber-framed floors and hip roof. However, its original open eastern verandah has been demolished and replaced by a masonry, flat-roofed extension accommodating toilets, which also wraps around the wing’s southern side. One original timber-framed window survives, and the surviving original brick walls have been rendered and painted. The wing’s hip roof has been extended, but sections of early ogee profile gutters, beaded timber fascias, and timber boarded eaves survive. The original corrugated metal roof sheets have been replaced with modern ribbed metal sheets.

The interior comprises a large room, with non-original partitions forming a toilet in one corner. The original southern wall and most of the original eastern wall have been demolished to form openings into the extension on these sides. New windows and a modern partition with fireplace have been added.

The wing’s basement connects through to that of the main block but is at a higher level. It comprises one room with brick walls, and brick piers support the ground floor.

Two-Storey Wing (by 1915)

Although its construction date is not known, the two-storey wing may be largely 1890, incorporate 1890 fabric, or a later extension. It is not intact. At least part of its brick wall bonding is built up to the main block rather than keyed into the main block, as the single-storey service wing is. It has a rectangular footprint, concrete slab ground floor, and timber-framed first-floor floor structure. Its earlier, possibly original timber-framed hip roof has been demolished and replaced with a timber-framed skillion roof. It has been extended on its southern end with a skillion-roofed, two-storey, masonry and concrete ablutions block, replacing an early, single-storey, open-sided lean-to shelter (likely laundry) here. The exterior walls, originally face brick, have been largely rendered and painted, and no early doors or windows survive. Many non-original window penetrations and large openings have been made to the exterior.

The ground floor interior layout is not intact. It retains some early masonry partitions, however, modern partitions have been added and doorways closed over and repositioned. It comprises a large room, possibly originally a kitchen or laundry, two smaller adjacent rooms, one a modern cold room, and an L-shaped room, part of which was originally an open-sided verandah-like space that has been enclosed, and the other part an early stair hall to the first floor that has had its stair demolished and converted to a wide corridor to the now-demolished drive-thru. The floor, wall, and ceiling finishes are not early, and the original large fireplace has been demolished.

The first floor is not accessible, as its former access via non-original rear decks has been destroyed. Its interior is not intact, comprising a single, large room and all original partitions demolished. It retains sections of its original timber framed floor structure, floor boards, and early plaster wall finish, however, the floor, wall, and ceiling surfaces are predominantly not early.

The rear yard contains no features or structures of state-level cultural heritage significance.

== Heritage listing ==
Broadway Hotel was listed on the Queensland Heritage Register on 21 October 1992, as it satisfied the following criteria.

The place is important in demonstrating the evolution or pattern of Queensland's history.

The Broadway Hotel (1890) is important in demonstrating the evolution and pattern of Queensland's history, providing evidence of: the pattern of 1880s boom-era economic confidence, which led to a large increase in building throughout Queensland, most notably in Brisbane; and the evolution of the Woolloongabba-East Brisbane area in response to the growth of the railway and tramway systems.

The place is important because of its aesthetic significance.

Standing prominently on its corner site on Logan Road, Brisbane, the Broadway Hotel is important for its aesthetic significance as a three-storey hotel in an elaborate, boom-era style. It is a landmark within the Woolloongabba townscape.
