= Phoenix Building =

Phoenix Building may refer to:

== Australia ==
- Phoenix Buildings, Woolloongabba, heritage-listed commercial buildings in Brisbane, Queensland, Australia

== United States ==
- Phoenix Building/Cincinnati Club, two heritage-listed buildings in downtown Cincinnati, Ohio
- Phoenix Building in Milwaukee, Wisconsin's Historic Third Ward
- Phoenix Building (Pittsford, New York), heritage-listed inn and tavern in Monroe County, New York
- Phoenix Building (Rockland, Massachusetts), heritage-listed building in Rockland, Massachusetts
- Manhattan Building (Muskogee, Oklahoma), also known as the Phoenix Building or the Phoenix-Manhattan Building, a heritage-listed skyscraper in Muskogee, Oklahoma
- Phoenix Life Insurance Company Building in Hartford, Connecticut
