= Ipswich Road, Brisbane =

Road in Brisbane, Australia

Ipswich Road Queensland
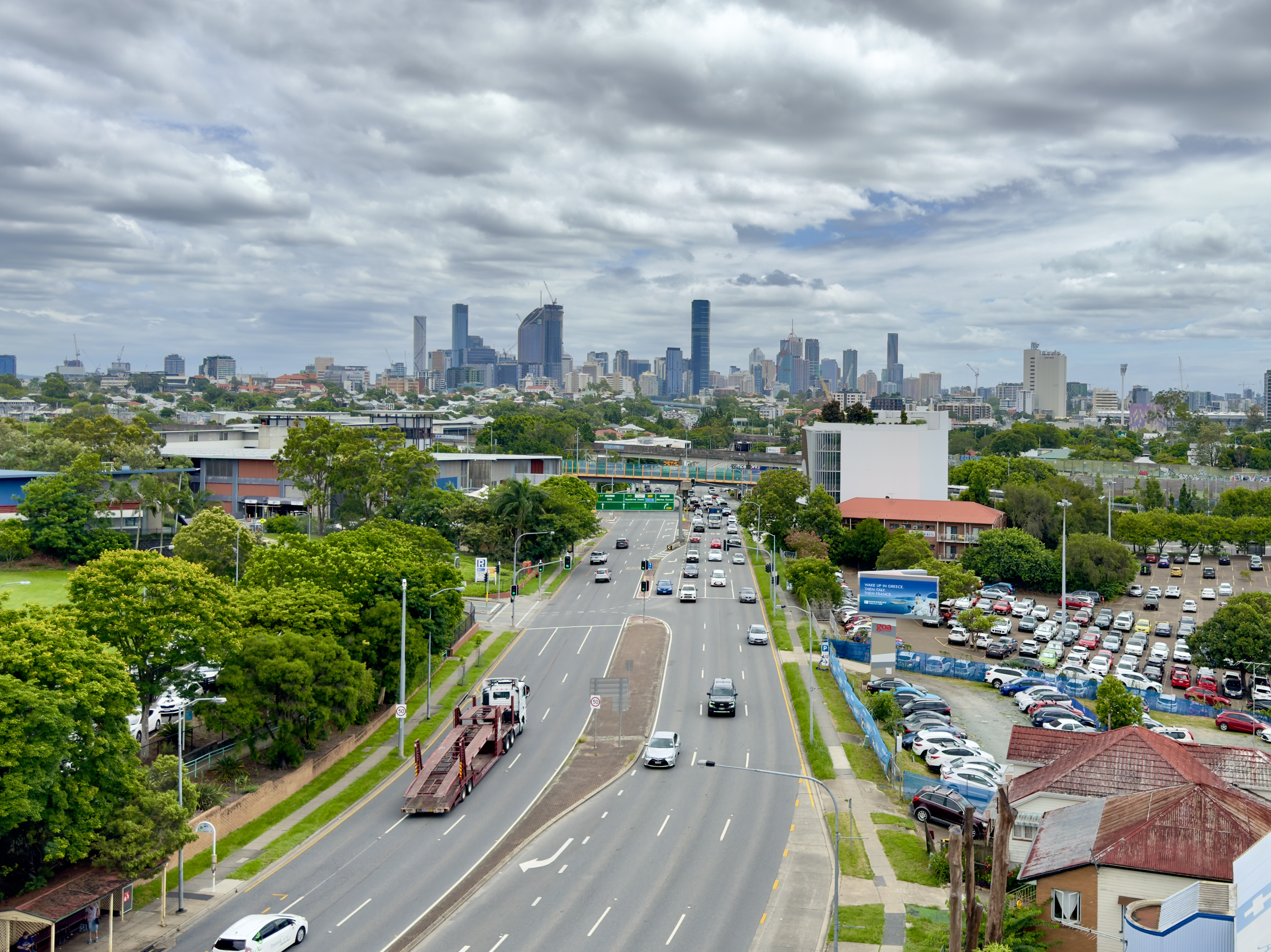
- Ipswich Road in Woolloongabba, 2024
- Coordinates: 27°34′31.64″S 152°56′58.61″E

General information
- Type: Road
- Length: 6.5 km (4.0 mi)
- Route number(s): A7; State Route 15

Major junctions
- NE end: Main Street, Woolloongabba
- Clem Jones Tunnel; Annerley Road (State Route 10); Beaudesert Road
- SW end: Ipswich Motorway, Rocklea

Location(s)
- Major suburbs: Annerley, Moorooka

Ipswich Road is major road in the City of Brisbane, Queensland, Australia. The road has been an important transport route since the 19th century when it connected the towns of Brisbane and Ipswich.

Logan Road, Pacific Motorway, and Beaudesert Road (Mount Lindesay Highway) are the other major roads in the south of Brisbane.

== Woolloongabba ==
Ipswich Road begins at the Woolloongabba Fiveways intersection. From there Ipswich Road heads south towards Ipswich, Main Street heads north (to the tip of Kangaroo Point), Stanley Street goes east and west and Logan Road heads south-east towards Logan City.

The heritage-listed Norman Hotel is positioned on 102 Ipswich Road at Woolloongabba. The establishment was built in 1889, opened in 1890 and quickly became a local landmark.

The Clem Jones Tunnel has an entry and exit point on Ipswich Road at Woolloongabba, the same place that the Pacific Motorway crosses over the road. Also in this vicinity the Eastern Busway crosses Ipswich Road.

== Buranda ==
The Princess Alexandra Hospital is located on Ipswich Road at Buranda, as is the Buranda Shopping Centre (formerly the Ipswich Road tram depot).

== Annerley ==
Ipswich Road near the junction of Annerley Road in Annerley, Queensland, 2009

At Annerley, Ipswich Road intersects with Annerley Road (formerly Boggo Road) at the Annerley Junction.

There are a number of heritage-listed sites on Ipswich Road in Annerley. In the Annerley Junction area are:

- 413 Ipswich Road: Tram substation (part of the infrastructure of Brisbane's former tramways, now used as a hotel restaurant)
- 413 Ipswich Road: Fig tree (the sole survivor of an avenue of fig trees planted on Ipswich Road in Annerley between 1911 and 1955)
- 444 Ipswich Road: Police Station (built in 1925 and still in use as a police station)
- 448 Ipswich Road: Annerley Library & Community Centre (designed in 1956 by architect James Birrell)

Further along in the Chardon's Corner area (the intersection with Cracknell Road where the Chardons Hotel stands), there are more heritage-listed sites:

- 616 Ipswich Road: Mary Immaculate Catholic Church (a notable city landmark due to its prominent position and its imposing interwar Gothic architecture)
- 770 Ipswich Road: Shops

== Yeronga ==
In Yeronga the road passes the heritage-listed Yeronga Memorial Park and the heritage-listed Yeronga Fire Station.

The Ipswich Road is the boundary between Annerley and Yeronga in the vicinity of the Yeronga Memorial Park (Annerley being on the east, Yeronga on the west).

== Moorooka ==
At Moorooka the major arterial road called Beaudesert Road branches to the south east through the industrial suburbs of Salisbury and Acacia Ridge continuing on to the northern outskirts of Logan City. It is when Beaudesert Road crosses the Logan Motorway that Beaudesert Road becomes the Mount Lindesay Highway, which continues through to Logan, Jimboomba, Beaudesert and Mount Lindesay and beyond to the Queensland–New South Wales border.

South from this intersection the road is lined with numerous car sale yards and is known as the Moorooka Magic Mile of Motors.

== Rocklea ==
As it enters Rocklea, the road crosses over the Beenleigh railway line via the Rocklea Overpass. It then continues to the Granard Road interchange, where it becomes the upgraded Ipswich Motorway.

== Road traffic ==
At morning peak times the road can be congested anywhere from Annerley towards the city. According to the Brisbane City Council compared to 2007 rates, by 2016 the road is expected to carry an extra 12,000 cars each day. The road carried an average of 52,299 vehicles per day between July and December 2014.

== Trams ==
The last tram service in Brisbane took route S34 along Ipswich Road into Tottenham Road and the Ipswich Road Depot on 14 April 1969.

== Major intersections ==
The entire road is in the Brisbane local government area.

Location	km	mi	Destinations	Notes
Woolloongabba	0	0.0	Main Street (State Route 15) – north – Kangaroo Point / Stanley Street (State Route 41) – west – South Brisbane / east – East Brisbane / Logan Road – south–east – Greenslopes	Northern end of Ipswich Road (State Route 15); No access to Logan Road from Ipswich Road at this intersection.
Woolloongabba	0.8	0.50	Clem Jones Tunnel (M7) – north – Bowen Hills	No northbound entry from M7. No southbound exit to M7. Ipswich road continues south as A7.
Woolloongabba	1.2	0.75	Okeefe Street – east – Greenslopes; Eastern Busway – west – Boggo Road busway station	Okeefe Street provides access to Logan Road (State Route 95) and Old Cleveland Road (State Route 22)
Woolloongabba – Annerley boundary	1.6	0.99	Cornwall Street – east – Greenslopes west – Fairfield, Dutton Park	Cornwall Street (to east) provides access to Pacific Motorway
Annerley	2.7	1.7	Annerley Road (State Route 10) – north–west – Dutton Park	State Route 10 northern concurrency terminus
Annerley	3.2	2.0	Waterton Street (State Route 10) – east – Tarragindi; Venner Road – west – Yeronga, Fairfield	State Route 10 southern concurrency terminus
Moorooka	4.7	2.9	Beaudesert Road – south–east – Moorooka	No southbound entry from Beaudesert Road. No northbound exit to Beaudesert Road.
Moorooka	6.5	4.0	Kenway Street – east – Moorooka	Southern end of Ipswich Road. A7 continues south as Ipswich Motorway
1.000 mi = 1.609 km; 1.000 km = 0.621 mi: Concurrency terminus; Incomplete access

== See also ==
- Logan Road
- Old Cleveland Road
- Road transport in Brisbane
