= Wooloongabba Branch railway line =

Former railway line in Queensland, Australia

Wooloongabba Branch
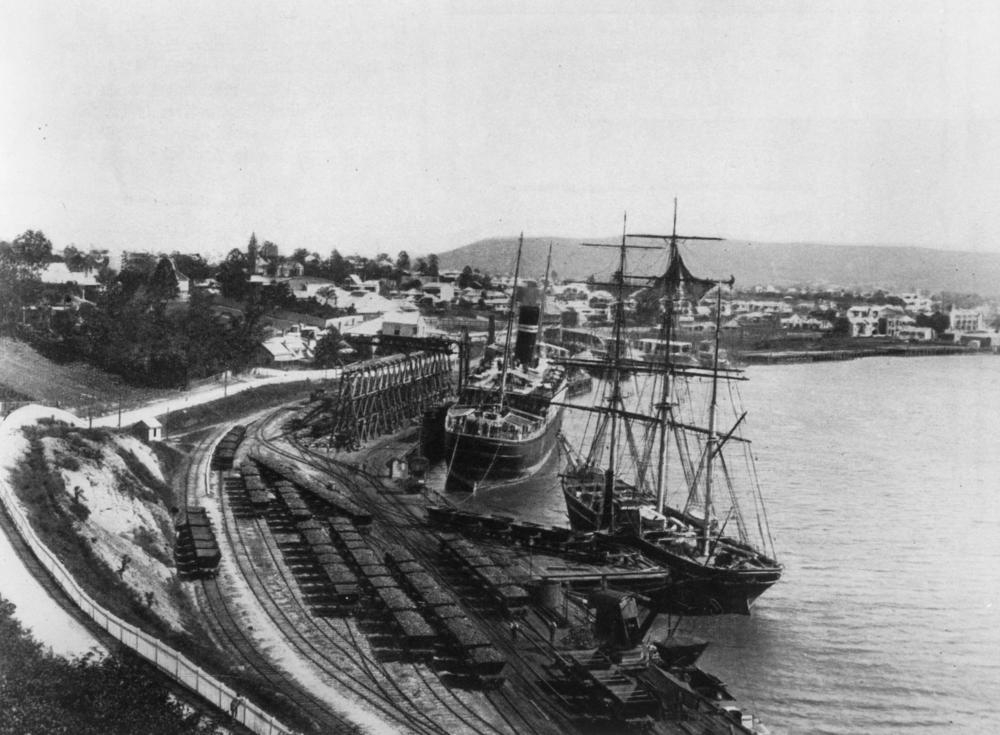
- South Brisbane coal wharf, c1889.

Overview
- Owner: Queensland Railways

Service
- Operator: Queensland Railways

History
- Opened: 2 June 1884
- Closed: Progressive from 1960 to 1989

Technical
- Track gauge: 3 ft 6 in (1,067 mm)

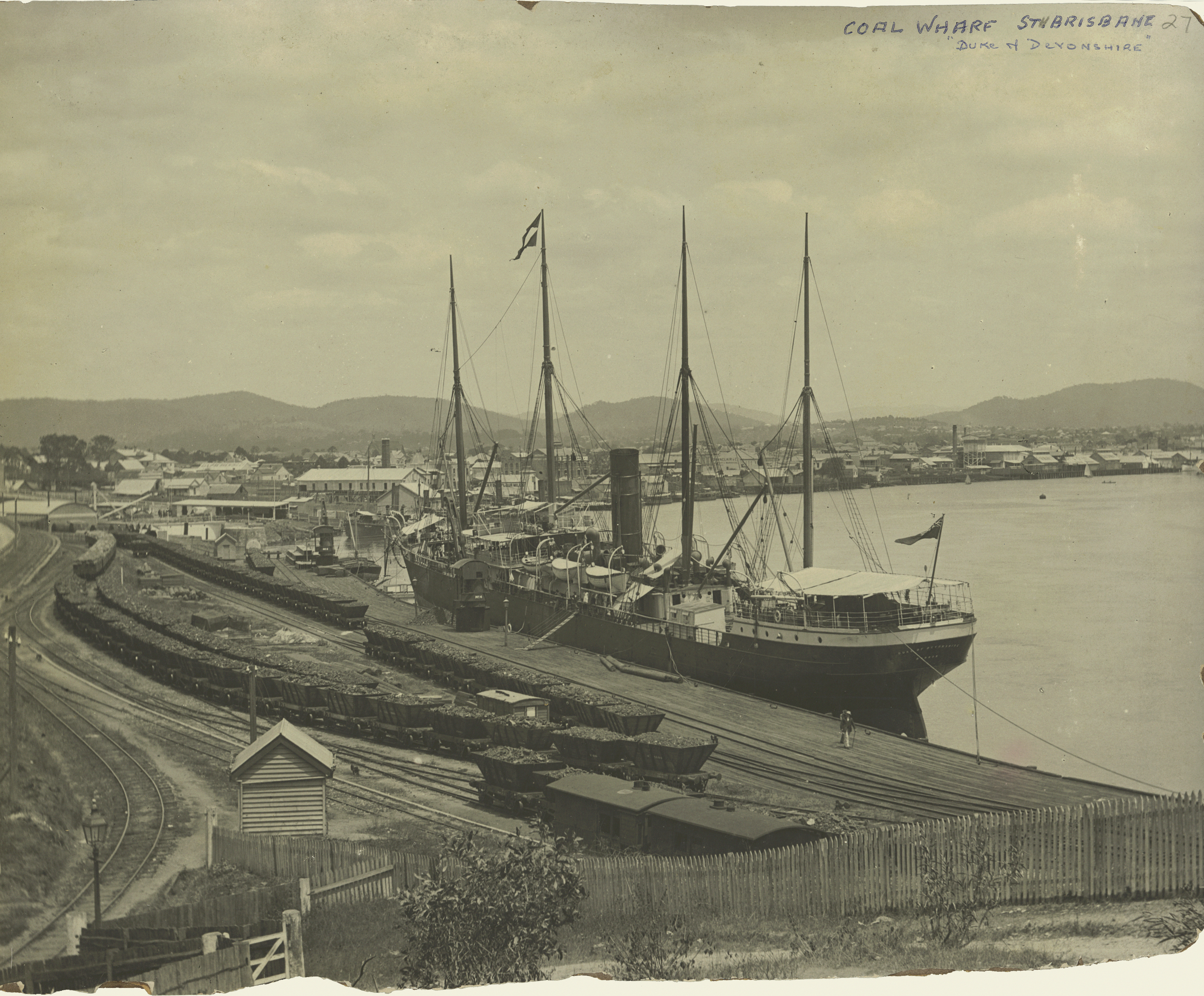
Coal wharf ~1898

The Wooloongabba Branch railway line was a branch line off the South Coast railway line in the inner southern suburbs of Brisbane, Australia. It opened on 2 June 1884 to serve the wharves and industries along the Brisbane River at Woolloongabba and South Brisbane. Queensland Railways always referred to the line as the Wooloongabba Branch (with one 'l'), despite the official spelling of the suburb it ran through being Woolloongabba (spelt with two 'l's).

== Approval and construction ==
A railway from the Western line to Woolloongabba was first proposed in 1878. A railway from South Brisbane Junction (now Corinda station) to Stanley Street railway station was approved by the Queensland Parliament on 17 September 1881. The first sod was turned in October 1882. The line was built to provide a connection for Ipswich area coal mines exporting from and/or refueling ships at the wharves.

The South Brisbane Wharf Branch extension was proposed in 1889 and costings were made in 1892.

== Route ==
The branch ran from Boggo Junction (now Dutton Park) and ran under the Cleveland line. There was passenger station at Albert and a passenger terminus at Stanley Street near the South Brisbane Dry Dock (now the Queensland Maritime Museum). The major locomotive depot for the southern half of Brisbane's suburban network was at "Wooloongabba". The line was extended to the State Fish Market near Victoria Bridge, opening on 30 March 1897 with the first consignment of goods on 12 April.

Stanley Street was the terminus for passenger trains south of the Brisbane River until the opening of Melbourne Street station.

== Closure ==
The South Brisbane Wharf Branch beyond Stanley Street closed in January 1960. Wooloongabba locomotive depot closed on 22 September 1967. Wheat traffic to the South Brisbane flour mills was transferred to South Brisbane station and limestone to Roma Street from October 1969. Much of the goods traffic was transferred from Wooloongabba to the new goods yard at Moolabin from December 1969 and much of the line closed on the 19th of that month. The line beyond Albert was dismantled in early 1970. The last section between Dutton Park and Albert closed in 1989.
