= Phoenix Buildings, Woolloongabba =

Phoenix Buildings
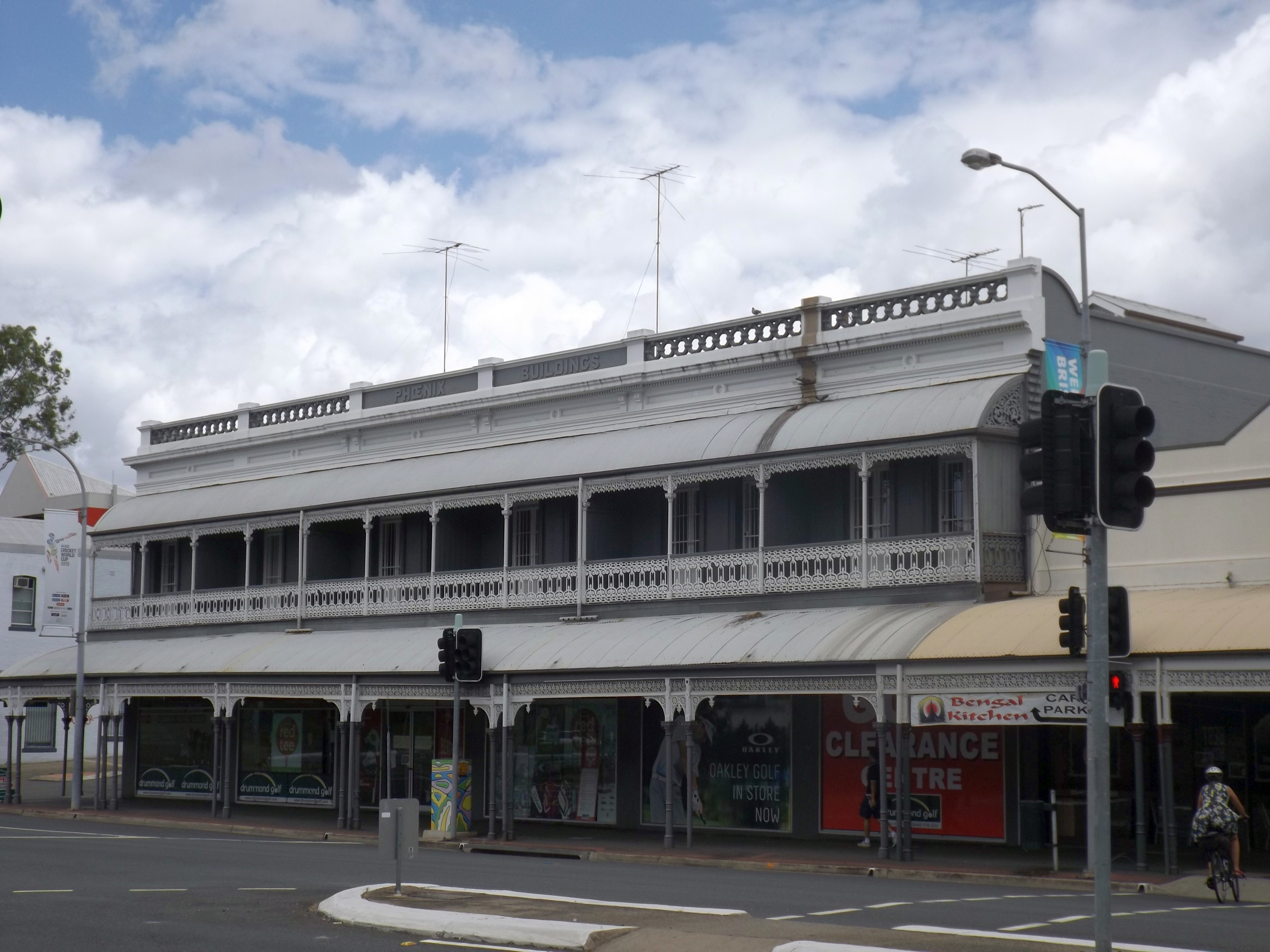
- Buildings in 2015

- Location within Queensland Location within Australia
- 27.4861°S 153.0304°E
- Location: 647 Stanley Street, Woolloongabba, City of Brisbane, Queensland, Australia

History
- Design period: 1870s–1890s (late 19th century)
- Built: 1889–1890
- Built for: William Davies

Site notes
- Architect: Richard Gailey

Queensland Heritage Register
- Official name: Phoenix Building
- Type: state heritage (built)
- Designated: 24 May 1995
- Reference no.: 600300
- Significant period: 1888–1889 (fabric); 1920–1986 (historical: Malouf Drapery Business)
- Builders: James Rix

The Phoenix Buildings are heritage-listed commercial buildings at 647 Stanley Street, Woolloongabba, City of Brisbane, Queensland, Australia. They were designed by Richard Gailey and built from 1889 to 1890 by James Rix. They were added to the Queensland Heritage Register on 24 May 1995.

== History ==
The Phoenix Buildings were erected in 1889–90 for William Davies, mining entrepreneur, who purchased subdivisions 1–5 of suburban allotment 135, parish of South Brisbane, in late 1888.

The buildings were designed by Brisbane architect Richard Gailey, who called tenders in April 1889. The contractor was Woolloongabba builder James Rix. Gailey designed a row of ten two-storeyed shops, six of which comprised the initial contract. Shops in the buildings were advertised for rent in the Brisbane Courier of July 1890. The ground floors of the other four shops appear to have been erected about the same time, but the upper floors were never completed.

In 1919, ownership of Phoenix Buildings passed to Davies' son, Maldwyn, who sold the property in mid-1920. The six two-storeyed shops were purchased by George Calile Malouf, who established a drapery business in the two end shops, and rented out the remainder. Malouf's became a familiar Woolloongabba landmark, expanding to include most of the premises. These buildings remain in the Malouf family, but the drapery business ceased operation in 1986.

The four single-storeyed shops were purchased by grocers Barry and Roberts. Although the decorative street awning survives, the buildings themselves have been substantially altered, and do not form part of the listing.

== Description ==
The Phoenix Buildings, comprising six two-storeyed, rendered masonry, attached shops, are located on the corner of Merton Street facing Stanley Street, a major arterial road through Woolloongabba. They form the end of a group of commercial buildings, ranging from the mid 19th century through to the early 20th century, with street awnings and decorative rendered facades.

The Stanley Street elevation is unified by a curved corrugated iron street awning, which continues in front of neighbouring shops returning slightly into Merton Street, and a narrow first floor verandah. The lined street awning has cast iron paired columns, brackets and valance, with shopfronts of aluminium framed glazing. The verandah has cast iron single columns, brackets, valance and balustrade, curved corrugated iron roof, timber partitions and floor with French doors and fanlights. A rendered parapet balustrade with circular openings above a deep cornice has the inscription PHOENIX BUILDINGS over the two centre panels.

Each shop has a hipped corrugated iron roof with, except for the corner shop, a central clerestory skylight behind a perimeter parapet. The two end shops nearest Merton Street are deeper, giving the building an L-shaped plan, the other four shops have a basement. The Merton Street elevation has pilasters, with cornice and parapet above, and sash windows with moulded surrounds. At the rear of the building the first floor verandahs are enclosed.

A caretakers flat on the first floor at the Merton Street end could indicate the original layout. The building is currently divided into two tenancies.

The ground floor of the Merton Street end tenancy has had party walls removed and has a suspended ceiling. The first floor has single skin tongue and groove partitions, boarded ceilings and clerestory skylights.

The second tenancy has been fitted out for offices with arched openings in party walls and suspended ceilings on both levels.

Turned timber staircases are intact in both tenancies, and basements have back to back fireplaces with shared chimneys which no longer operate.

A concrete block toilet addition with a lean-to corrugated iron roof is attached to the rear.

== Heritage listing ==
The Phoenix Buildings were listed on the Queensland Heritage Register on 24 May 1995 having satisfied the following criteria.

The place is important in demonstrating the evolution or pattern of Queensland's history.

Phoenix Buildings are an integral part of a group of commercial buildings which are important in demonstrating the evolution of Clarence Corner as a business and retail centre from the mid-19th century through to the early 20th century, and in particular, illustrate Woolloongabba's commercial development in the 1880s.

The place demonstrates rare, uncommon or endangered aspects of Queensland's cultural heritage.

The place is evidence of 1880s brick attached shops in Brisbane, a now rare aspect of Queensland's cultural heritage.

The place is important in demonstrating the principal characteristics of a particular class of cultural places.

As one of the few known examples of attached shops designed by Brisbane architect Richard Gailey, Phoenix Buildings are important in demonstrating some of the principal characteristics of Gailey's commercial work.

The place is important because of its aesthetic significance.

In scale and form, Phoenix Buildings exhibit an aesthetic contribution to the Stanley Street streetscape and to the Woolloongabba townscape which is valued by the community.
