= Stanley Street, Brisbane =

Street in Brisbane, Queensland, Australia

Stanley Street Queensland

General information
- Type: Street
- Length: 1.5 km (0.9 mi)
- Route number(s): State Route 41; State Route 10

Major junctions
- West end: South Brisbane
- East end: Woolloongabba

Location(s)
- Suburb(s): Woolloongabba

Stanley Street is a major street in Brisbane, Queensland. It carries the designation state route 41 for the entirety of its length and state route 10 between the Vulture Street and Annerley Road intersections. For the majority of its length the road is a one-way carriageway westbound. The route is a major connector between the Southern and Eastern suburbs and South Brisbane. The street passes directly to the south of The Gabba and runs directly through the Mater Hospital precinct.

Stanley Street is accessible via exit 2 on the Pacific Motorway.

== History ==
Stanley Street was named after Frederick Stanley, 16th Earl of Derby, the United Kingdom's Colonial Secretary, 1885–1886.

In the late 1880s, at least two hotels were built on Stanley Street, the Brisbane Bridge Hotel and Graham's Hotel. Stanley Street used to continue past the Vulture Street intersection, and follow the Brisbane River north to Kurilpa Point. At this time South Brisbane was an industrial area. The road between Melbourne Street and Vulture Street was removed to make way for the construction of the Expo '88 World's Fair precinct. The precinct was converted to South Bank Parklands after the Expo. At this time a small section of the route north of Vulture Street between Tribune and Glenelg Streets was renamed Little Stanley Street.

In 2006, with the construction of the Queensland Gallery of Modern Art, the section of road still named Stanley street which tunneled under the Queensland Art Gallery was renamed Cultural Centre Tunnel and the road to the north was removed to make way for construction. A new section of road slightly to the west of the old road was built and named Stanley Place.

Of the old Stanley Street in South Brisbane, only a section about 100 m long, running alongside the Queensland Maritime Museum remains. The remainder has been built over by the Gallery of Modern Art and South Bank Parklands, rebuilt as a pedestrian plaza as part of the Parklands (Stanley Street Plaza and the Cultural Forecourt); or renamed.

The development of Woolloongabba railway station plans to strengthen Stanley Street's importance as a major connection between the CBD and southern suburbs.

== Significant features ==
On Stanley Street between the intersection with Vulture Street and Annerley Road, there is a major hospital precinct including Queensland Children's Hospital and the Mater Public Hospital.

The Stanley Street junction with Annerley Road (formerly Boggo Road) at Woolloongabba/South Brisbane is known as Clarence Corner.

The Stanley Street intersection with Ipswich Road, Logan Road and Main Street at Woolloongabba is known as the Woolloongabba Fiveways and features The Gabba sports ground.

== Major intersections ==
The entire road is in the Brisbane local government area.

Location	km	mi	Destinations	Notes
Woolloongabba–East Brisbane boundary	0	0.0	Stanley Street East (State Route 41) – east – East Brisbane / Wellington Road – north – East Brisbane / south – East Brisbane	Eastern end of Stanley Street (State Route 41)
Woolloongabba	0.4	0.25	Main Street (State Route 15) – north – Kangaroo Point / Ipswich Road (State Route 15) – south – Annerley	
Woolloongabba	0.7– 0.9	0.43– 0.56	Pacific Motorway – northwest – Brisbane City / southeast – Greenslopes	No exit from Stanley Street eastbound to Pacific Motorway southbound
Woolloongabba–South Brisbane boundary	1.1	0.68	Annerley Road (State Route 10) – south – Dutton Park	Eastern concurrency terminus with State Route 10
South Brisbane	1.5	0.93	Vulture Street (State Route 10) – west – West End / Vulture Street (State Route 41) – east – Woolloongabba	Western concurrency terminus with State Route 10. Western end of Stanley Street.
1.000 mi = 1.609 km; 1.000 km = 0.621 mi: Concurrency terminus; Incomplete access

== See also ==
- Road transport in Brisbane
