= Annerley =

- Suburb
- Ipswich Road near the junction of Annerley Road

- Interactive map of Annerley
- Coordinates: 27.5122°S 153.0330°E
- Country: Australia
- State: Queensland
- City: Brisbane
- LGA: City of Brisbane (Coorparoo Ward, Tennyson Ward)
- Location: 6.2 km (3.9 mi) S of Brisbane CBD

Government
  - State electorates: South Brisbane; Miller
  - Federal division: Moreton

Area
  - Total: 2.8 km^{2} (1.1 sq mi)
- Elevation: 48 m (157 ft)

Population
  - Total: 11,891 (2021 census)
  - Density: 4,250/km^{2} (11,000/sq mi)
- Time zone: UTC+10:00 (AEST)
- Postcode: 4103
Suburbs around Annerley
Dutton Park	Woolloongabba	Greenslopes
Fairfield	Annerley	Tarragindi
Yeronga; Yeerongpilly	Moorooka	Tarragindi

Annerley is a suburb in the City of Brisbane, Queensland, Australia. Annerley is located 6.2 kilometres (3.9 mi) by road south of the Brisbane CBD. In the 2021 census, Annerley had a population of 11,891 people.

== Geography ==
Much of the suburb is elevated, lying on a ridge that gives views of the city. For many years it was a somewhat rundown suburb, particularly close to main roads and with a lot of social housing, but with gentrification and the rise in the cost of housing, many of the original 'Queenslanders' have been restored to their former glory, giving the suburb an eclectic mix of residences for all socio-economic levels.

The suburb is of medium population density with many apartment blocks, guest houses and fast-food outlets. The major road in the suburb is Ipswich Road, one of Brisbane's main southerly traffic arteries. Until 13 April 1969, the suburb was served by electric trams, which ran along Ipswich Road.

The area where Ipswich Road intersects with Annerley Road (formerly Boggo Road) is commonly known as Annerley Junction, which in turn gave its name to the local state primary school Junction Park State School.

== History ==
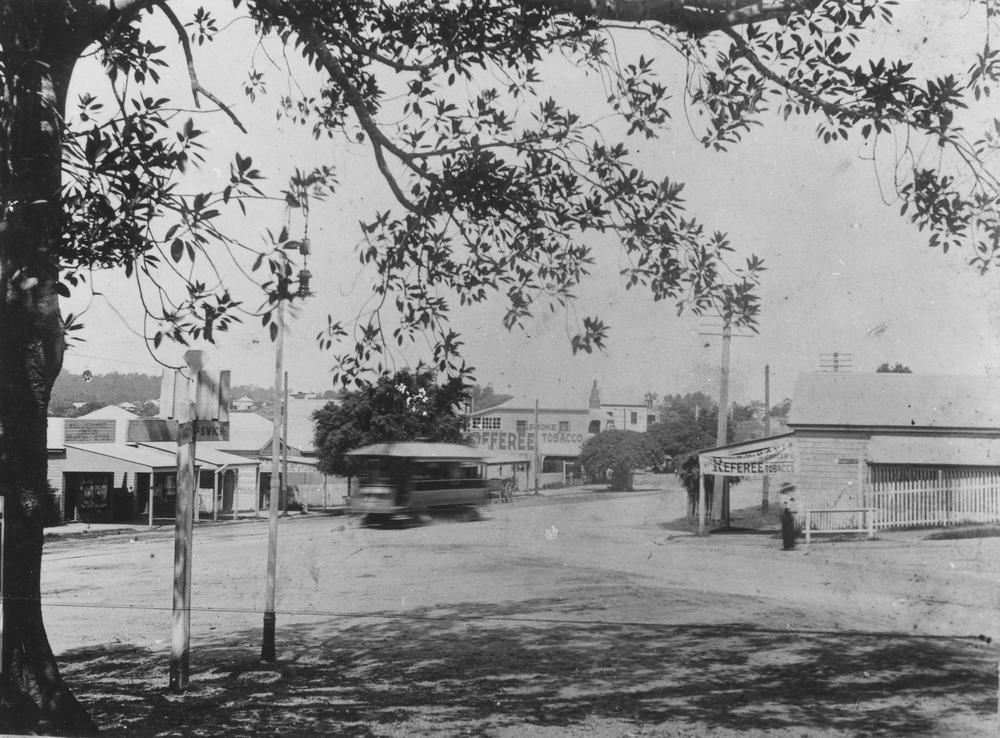
Junction of Ipswich and Annerley Roads c.1915

The area was originally used for dairy farms.

=== Land sales ===
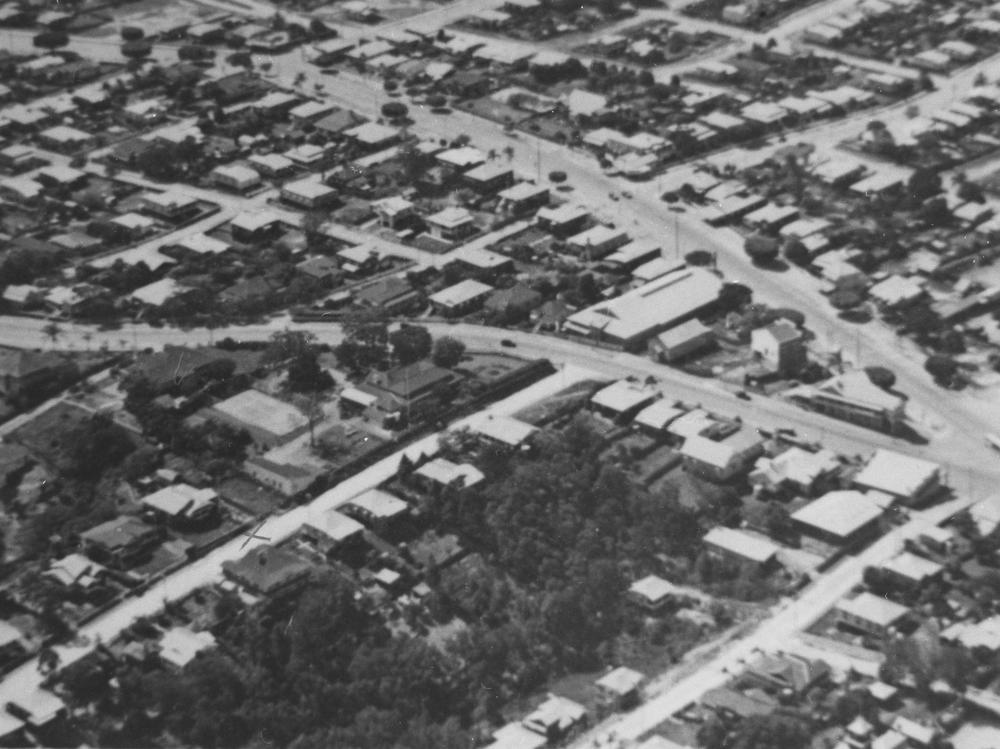
Aerial view of Annerley c.1934

One of the first residential subdivisions was the "St Kilda Estate" bounded by Cornwall Street to the north, Boggo Road (now Annerley Road) to the west and Ipswich Road to the south. In 1866, the Junction Hotel was opened on the triangular corner of Ipswich Road and Boggo Road (now Annerley Road).

On 7 June 1884, J.B. Ellis auctioned 201 suburban allotments (66 to 30 perches) in the "River View Estate" which was bounded by River View Street (now Fanny Street) to the south and Old Ipswich Road (now Annerley Road) to the east and includes Caroline and Florence Streets (between the Fairfield railway station and the Junction Hotel). The auction did not sell all the allotments as on 8 September 1885 Hooker, Son & Elliott auctioned 89 unsold allotments in the same estate.

On 26 July 1884, James Duncan auctioned 20 suburban allotments (all 16 perches) in the "Hastings Estate" which were located on Fanny Street near the intersection with Hastings Street. These appear to be a later stage of an estate that was offered at least as early as 1869.

On 25 October 1884, Arthur Martin & Co auctioned 201 suburban allotments (mostly 16 perches) in the "Broadmere Estate" in Mary Street (now Broadmere Street), Clara Street, Frederick Street and George Street (now Somerville Street) around the intersection with Francis Street (now Tamworth Street).

In September 1885, the balance of the third and last section of the "Thompson Estate" was advertised for auction by L. J. Markwell. It consisted of approximately 300 allotments, subdivisions of Portion 85, which was bordered by Ipswich Road, Victoria Terrace and Juliette Street. A map advertising the auction provided a local sketch of the area. It also places the estate in Woolloongabba, now considered part of Annerley.

In July 1886, H. Ponsonby Cardew advertised 66 allotments for private sale in the "Ferndale Estate", subdivisions of Portion 110, Parish of Yerongpilly, including Alice Street (now Rigby Street), Gibson Street, Ferndale Street, Ellen Street (now Jester Street), Jessie Street (now Collins Street) and Government Road (now Ekibin Road East). A map advertising the sale states the land is situated just beyond the Junction Hotel, Ipswich Road.

In May 1888, Arthur Martin & Co., Auctioneers, advertised 44 allotments for auction in the "River View Estate", being subdivisions of Portions 159A and 160A, Parish of Yerongpilly. The map advertising the auction states the land is close to Junction Hotel. The land includes River View Street (now Fanny Street), Old Ipswich Road (now Annerley Road), Caroline and Florence Streets.

On 6 May 1889, Simon Fraser & Son Auctioneers advertised 8 allotments for sale on Ipswich Rd, being resubdivisions of 1 to 8 of Subdivision 43 to 46 Portion 173A, Parish of Yeerongpilly. The advertising map states the land is close to Junction Hotel and opposite Stephen's Divisional Board Office. The land is shown as located at the corner of Ipswich Rd and Boggo Rd (now Annerley Rd).

In October 1889, H. Ponsonby Cardew advertised 16 allotments for auction in the "Ferndale Estate" to close out the estate. A map advertising the auction includes a local sketch of the area.

In November 1889, T. Howling & Co., Auctioneers, advertised allotments for sale in the "Richter Estate", being subdivisions 1 to 94 of Portion 109, Parish of Bulimba. A map advertising the auction states that the land is close to Junction Ipswich Road.

In 1910, auctioneers Hooker, Son & Elliott offered 75 suburban allotments of 16 perches in the "Collins Estate" which was bounded by Ipswich Road to the west, Ekibin Road to the south and includes Rose Street (now Lambton Street), Jane Street (now Lothian Street), Alice Street (now Bower Street), Annie Street (now Real Street) and Mary Street (now Gustavson Street).

In April 1914, estate agent Arthur R. Webb offered 160 suburban allotments (mostly of 16 perches) in the "Queenstown Estate" which included allotments in Dairy Street (now Franklin Street), Taylor Street, Albert Street, Cosker Street, Queen Street (now Cavan Street), Hamlet Street and Woodville Place.

In October 1914, "Cracknell Hill Estate", made up of 115 allotments of 16 perches, was advertised for sale by Isles, Love & Co., Auctioneers. The map advertising the sale states that the estate was a five minute walk from the proposed new tram terminus at Chardon's Hotel.

In July 1915, "Tramway Terminus Estate", consisting of 17 allotments being resubdivisions of section 3 of Portion 109, was advertised to be auctioned by Cameron Bros., Town Hall Auctioneers. The land was bound by Ipswich Road, Richter Street and Ferndale Street. The map advertising the auction states that gas and water mains pass the estate and a few yards from Chardon's Hotel.

On 17 April 1920, auctioneers Cameron Brothers offered 97 allotments (mostly 16 perches) in the "Cracknell Hill Estate" which were in Queen Street (now Cavan Street), Hamlet Terrace (now Hamlet Street) and Woodville Place between Warwick Street (now Marjorie Street) and Percy Street. These appear to be unsold allotments of an estate first offered in October 1914.

In August 1924, Marcus F. Lyons & Winning advertised 312 allotments for private sale in the "Cracknel Road Estate", being subdivisions 1 to 313 of resubdivision 1 and 2 of portion 113, Parish of Yeerongpilly. A map advertising the sale states the estate is 5 minutes from Ipswich Road Trams, water main and electricity passes through the estate; and gas is handy to the estate.

=== Post Office ===
Around 1880 a postal receiving office was opened at Boggo, which became Boggo Post Office on 1 May 1882. There was a proposal to rename it Richmond Post Office but this was rejected owing to the potential for confusion with Richmond, North Queensland and Richmond, New South Wales and new alternative names were sought. At this point it is believed that Digby Denham, then a member of the Stephens Divisional Board (and later a Premier of Queensland), proposed to call it Annerley after the township variously spelled Annerley, Annerly or Anerly in Surrey, England. The post office was renamed Annerley Post Office in November 1892.

=== St John's Presbyterian Church ===
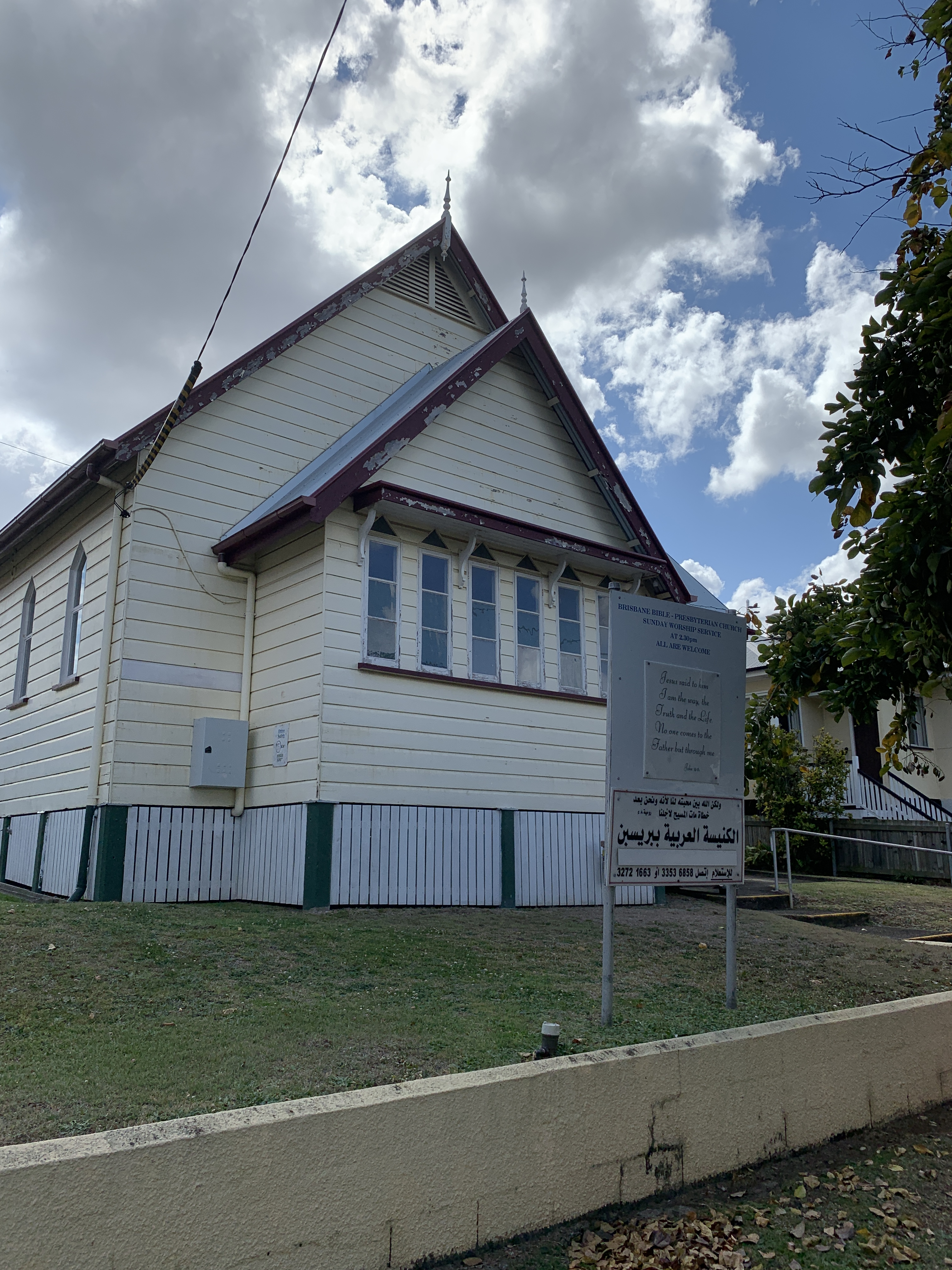
St John's Presbyterian Church Hall (first church), 2020

The Thompson Estate Presbyterian Church opened on 16 May 1886 at 23-29 King Street. It was a weatherboard building built in the Victorian Carpenter Gothic style, 30 by 25 feet (9.1 by 7.6 m) at a cost of £150 by Mr Krause. It was an initiative by local residents who were then part of the congregation of the Park Presbyterian Church in South Brisbane. In 1922 the minister Reverend Alexander Duff began to fundraise for a larger church. In 1929 the new church was built to the west of the first church (which would become the church hall). On Saturday 23 November 1929, the second church was officially opened and dedicated to St John by the Presbyterian Moderator of Queensland, Reverend John Sinclair. The new church was designed by architect George Trotter, a member of the congregation, in Federation Gothic style. It was built by Edward Kirby for £3,500. The main body of the church was 61 by 32 feet (18.6 by 9.8 m), capable of seating 300 people, with a proscenium and recess for a pipe organ and two vestries, each 15 by 11 feet (4.6 by 3.4 m).

Outreach efforts in Coorparoo commenced with Sunday school and Sunday evening services held in the Shire Hall on Cavendish Road. Land in Emlyn Street was purchased for £550 and a hall erected at a cost of £1500, opening in July 1928. In September 1931, Coorparoo Presbyterian Church engaged its first minister Reverend Andrew Cuthbertson Kennedy.

=== Shire of Stephens ===
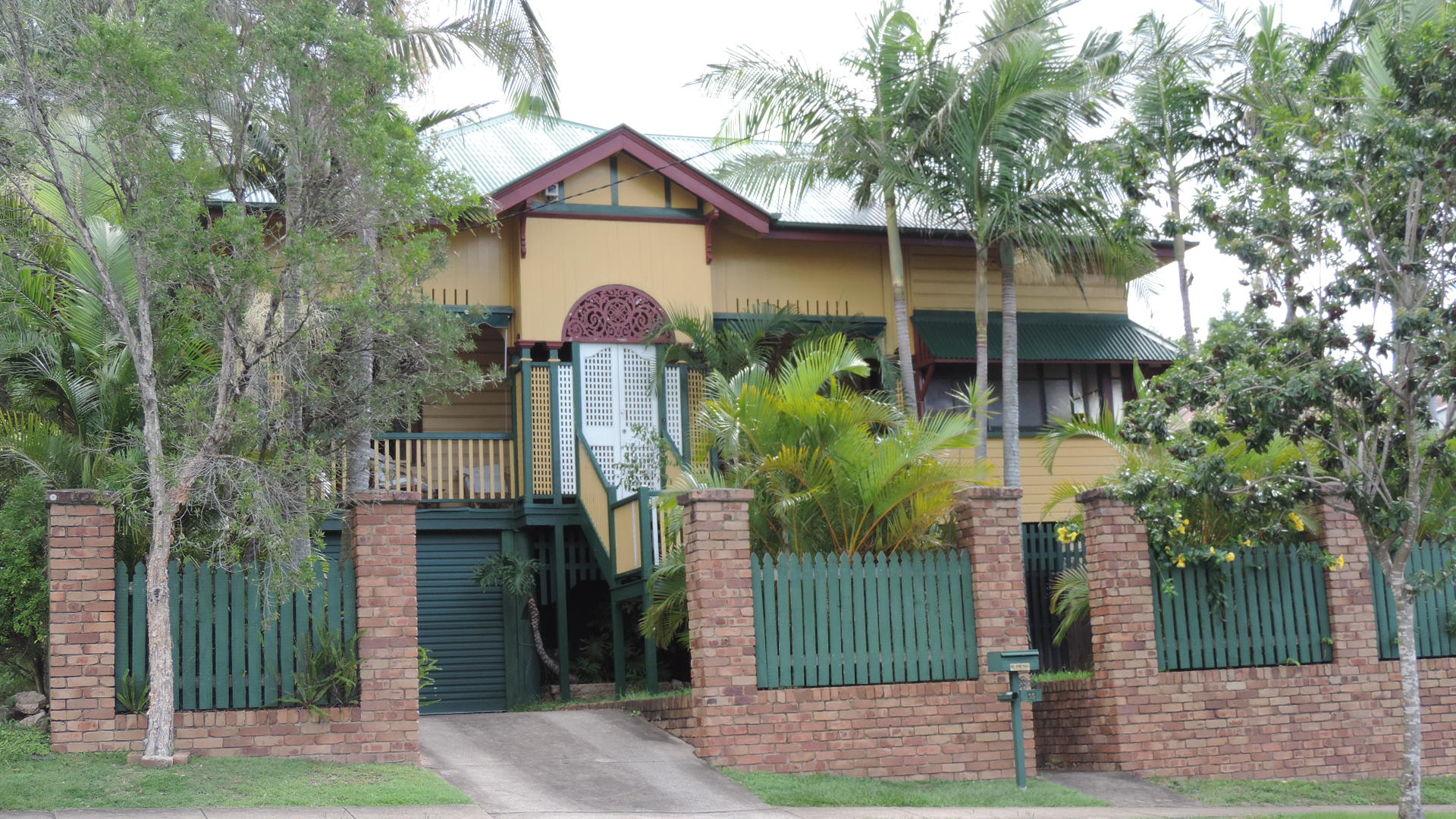
Former Stephens Shire office, 2014

On 14 October 1886, following a successful petition from ratepayers to create a new division, Stephens Division was severed from subdivision No. 1 of Yeerongpilly Division. In 1903 it became the Shire of Stephens. Annerley was the seat of the Shire of Stephens. The shire offices were located on Ipswich Road between Victoria Terrace and Junction Terrace (27.5069°S 153.0347°E). After the shire became part of the City of Brisbane in 1925, the land was sold and the offices relocated on the block to become a residence at 15 Ealing Street (27.5070°S 153.0351°E).

=== St Philip's Anglican Church ===
St Philip's Anglican Church in Thompson Estate (as the area was then known) was dedicated on 18 October 1886 by Archbishop of Brisbane William Webber. It was designed by architect John Henry Burley and was built by J.W. Stranson. The church bell was a gift of Abraham Fleetwood Luya and the baptismal font was the gift of stonemason Andrew Lang Petrie. On 7 December 1905, the church was "reduced to ruin" by a severe storm which caused extensive flooding and the death of two children. It was extended and re-dedicated on 1 April 1906 by St. Clair Donaldson, Archbishop of Brisbane, with Henry Wallace Atkinson as architect. The old church was destroyed by fire 28 November 1954 after work on the new church had begun. The current church was consecrated by the Archbishop Reginald Halse on 1 December 1955. It is listed on the Brisbane Heritage Register. There were at least two parishioners that lost their lives at Gallipoli. "At St Philips we know of only two of our parishioners who were part of this landing at Gallipoli who later died on 5 April 1918 in France. The two were good mates and brother and brother in law. They died on the same day in the same battle recorded by the historian Charles Bean. ....Reginald Verry and his brother in law James Victor Atkinson." A state funeral was held at the church for Gordon Brown who was a Senator for Queensland from 1932 to 1965 (as a member of the Australia Labor Party); his ashes are kept in the church's columbarium.

=== Thompson Estate Methodist Church ===
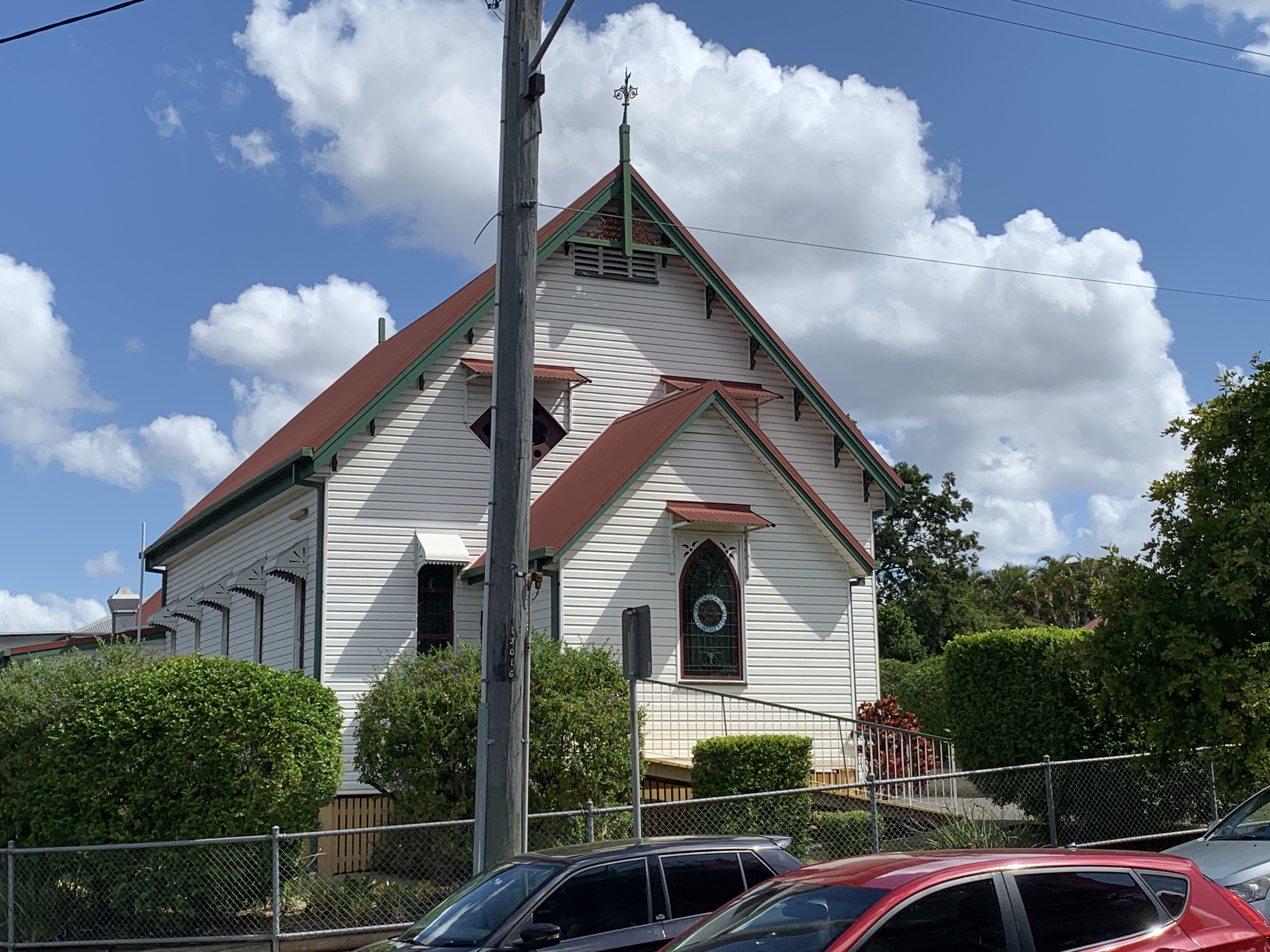
Apostolic Church (formerly Methodist Church), 2020

A Wesleyan Methodist Church opened at 151 Cornwall Street, Thompson Estate, on Sunday 4 November 1888. A Wesleyan Sunday School had operated in that area in the public hall in Regent Street from February 1887; its popularity leading to the decision to build a church. The church was designed by architects Mark Taylor and William Richer and built by Mr C Topper.

On 25 August 1973, it was officially re-opened as an Apostolic Church by Apostles A. Niemeyer and Emil Zielke. A stained glass window with the church's logo was installed at the front of the church.

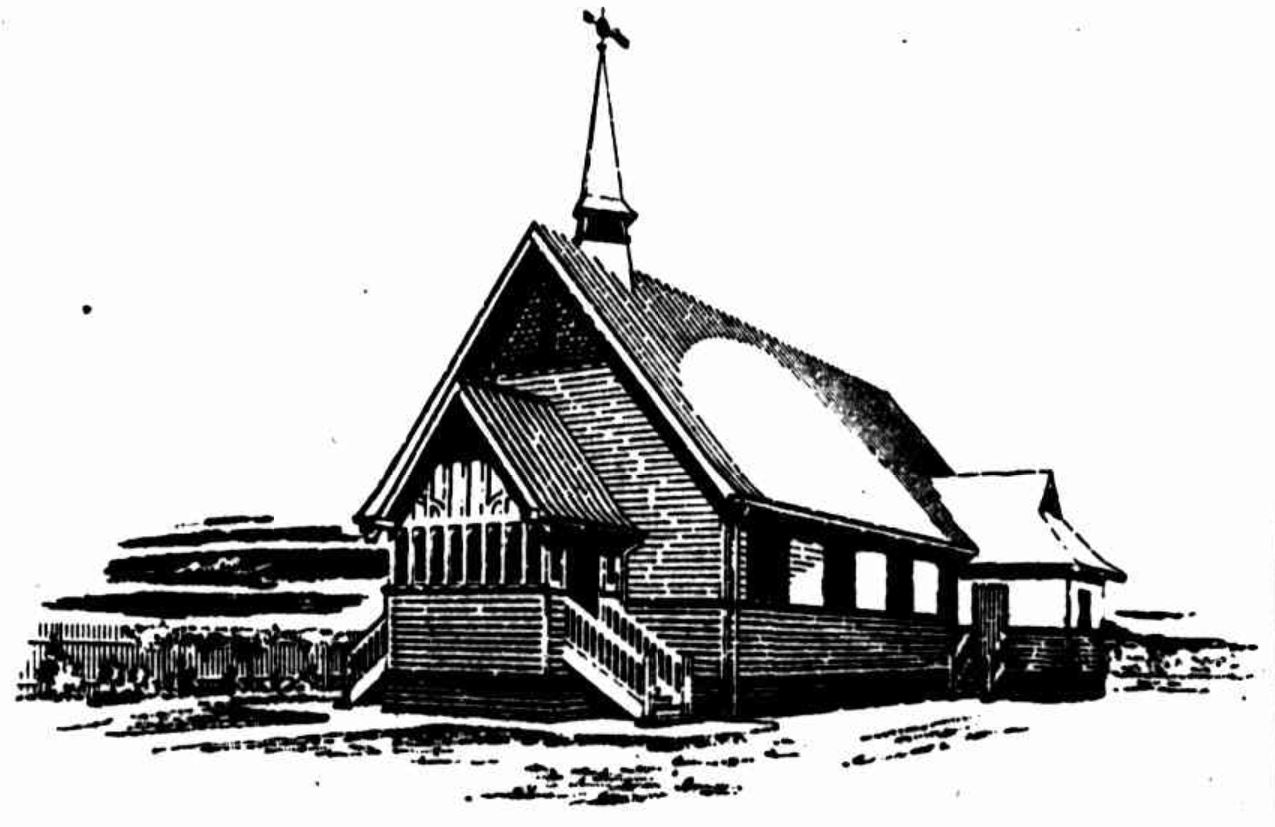
Cracknell Road Congregational Church, designed by Brenan Gargett, 1925

=== Annerley Congregational Church ===
A Congregational Church community formed in the Cracknell Road area with the commencement of Sunday schools in the homes of Mrs B. G. Wilson (The Wilderness) and Mrs W. G. Grimes (Tarragindi House). In 1899 a small church building in Tarragindi was relocated to Cracknell Road (opposite the site of the current Uniting Church) with the first service held there on 30 May 1899, although not officially opened until 1901. By 1915 the congregation purchased the site opposite (the site of the current Brisbane Fijian Uniting Church) for £500 and build on that site a manse. In 1924 when it was decided to build a new church building on the current site, the manse was relocated to Horatio Street. The foundation stone of the new Cracknell Road Congregational Church was laid on 21 March 1925 by A. Walker. The church opened on 28 June 1925. The architect was Thomas Brenan Femister Gargett of Atkinson & Conrad and the contractor was C. G. Harris. The Jubilee Hall was built at the rear of the church in 1951 to celebrate the 50th anniversary of the church. In 1977, the church became the Annerley Uniting Church when it joined with many Congregational, Presbyterian and Methodists churches in an amalgamation to form the Uniting Church in Australia. It later became the Brisbane Fijian Uniting Church.

=== Annerley Methodist Church ===
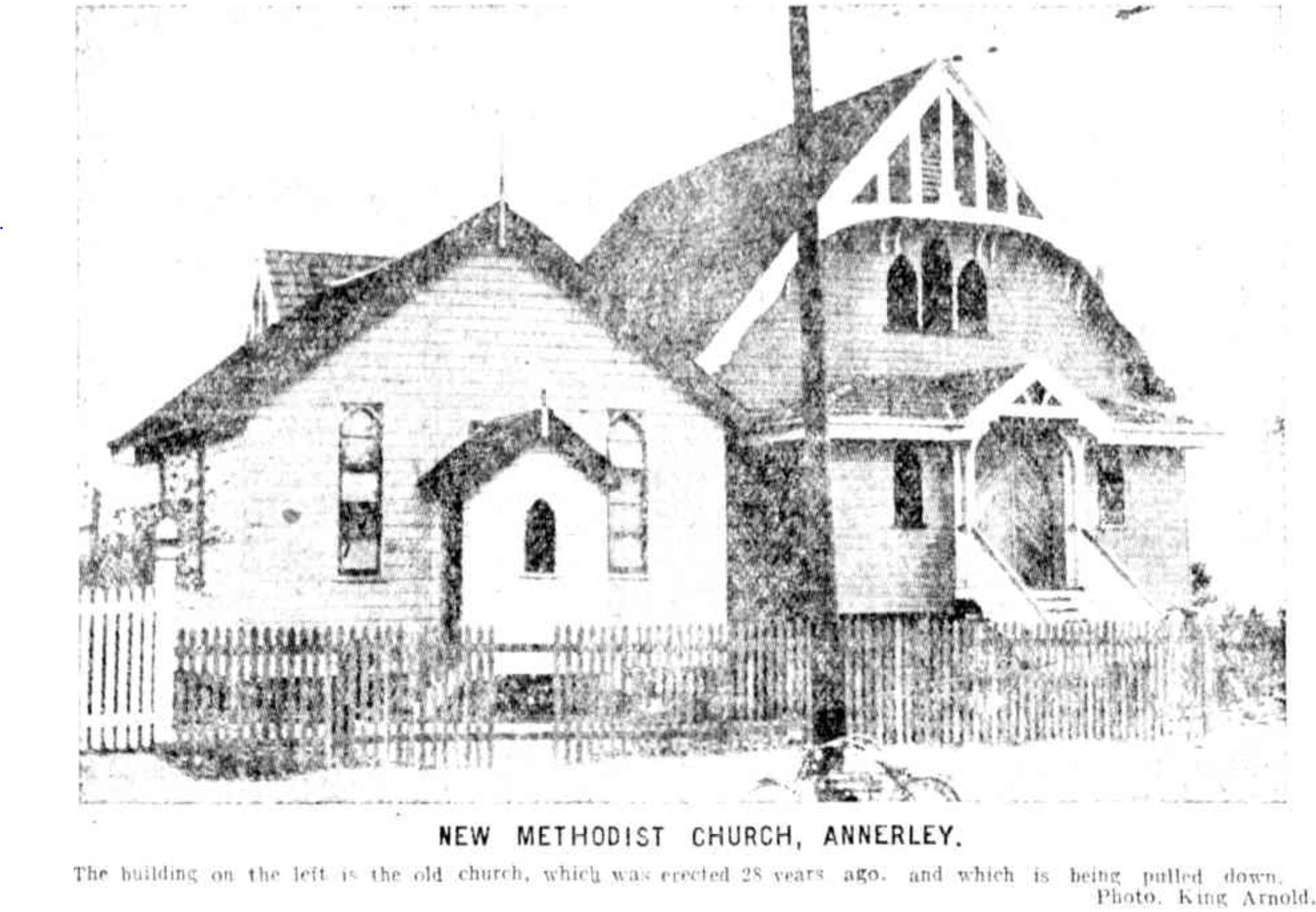
Old (left) and new (right) Methodist Church at Ipswich Road, Annerley, 1917

Circa 1889-1890, a Primitive Methodist Mission Hall/Church was operating at Ipswich Road at The Junction. On Sunday 30 November 1890 the new Primitive Methodist Church was opened at 541 Ipswich Road (corner Taunton Street, 27.5165°S 153.0297°E) at a cost of £250. In August 1917 a new church was erected to the right of the old church which was later demolished. In May 1940 there was a stump capping ceremony for a hall to be erected behind the church. On Tuesday 8 October 1946 a fire badly damaged the church's hall but the firemen managed to save the church. A brick-veneer church building was subsequently constructed. The church was still operating in 1975, but by 1990 the church had closed and the building was being used as an antiques shop.

=== Annerley Church of Christ ===
On 4 February 1913, a Bible school commenced at Walker's Memorial Hall at 486 Ipswich Road (on the corner with Dudley Street East, 27.5106°S 153.0325°E), now the site of the Westpac Bank building. On 24 August 1913 a congregation was formed, also meeting at the Hall as well as holding tent meetings at the Annerley Junction (where Annerley Road and Ipswich Road meet). A letter from the Church of Christ in Ann Street in the Brisbane CBD dated 1 February 1914 formally acknowledged that part of its congregation were severing their connection with that church to form a self-governing Church of Christ at Annerley. As Walker's Hall had no facility suitable for the immersion baptism practiced by the church, these ceremonies were conducted in a clear pool in Ekibin Creek. In June 1918 an offer was made to the church to buy Walker's Hall for £500. The church considered the offer but declined, purchasing a site on Annerley Road in 1919 instead. In 1920 the vacant Vernor Church of Christ building was relocated to the Annerley Road site and re-erected as the first Annerley Church of Christ. By the 1960s the need for a new chapel was evident and on 21 November 1963 the Brisbane City Council approved the plans for a new chapel and school rooms, a project with an estimated cost of £13,000. The new chapel was officially opened on Sunday 11 October 1964.

=== Mary Immaculate Church ===
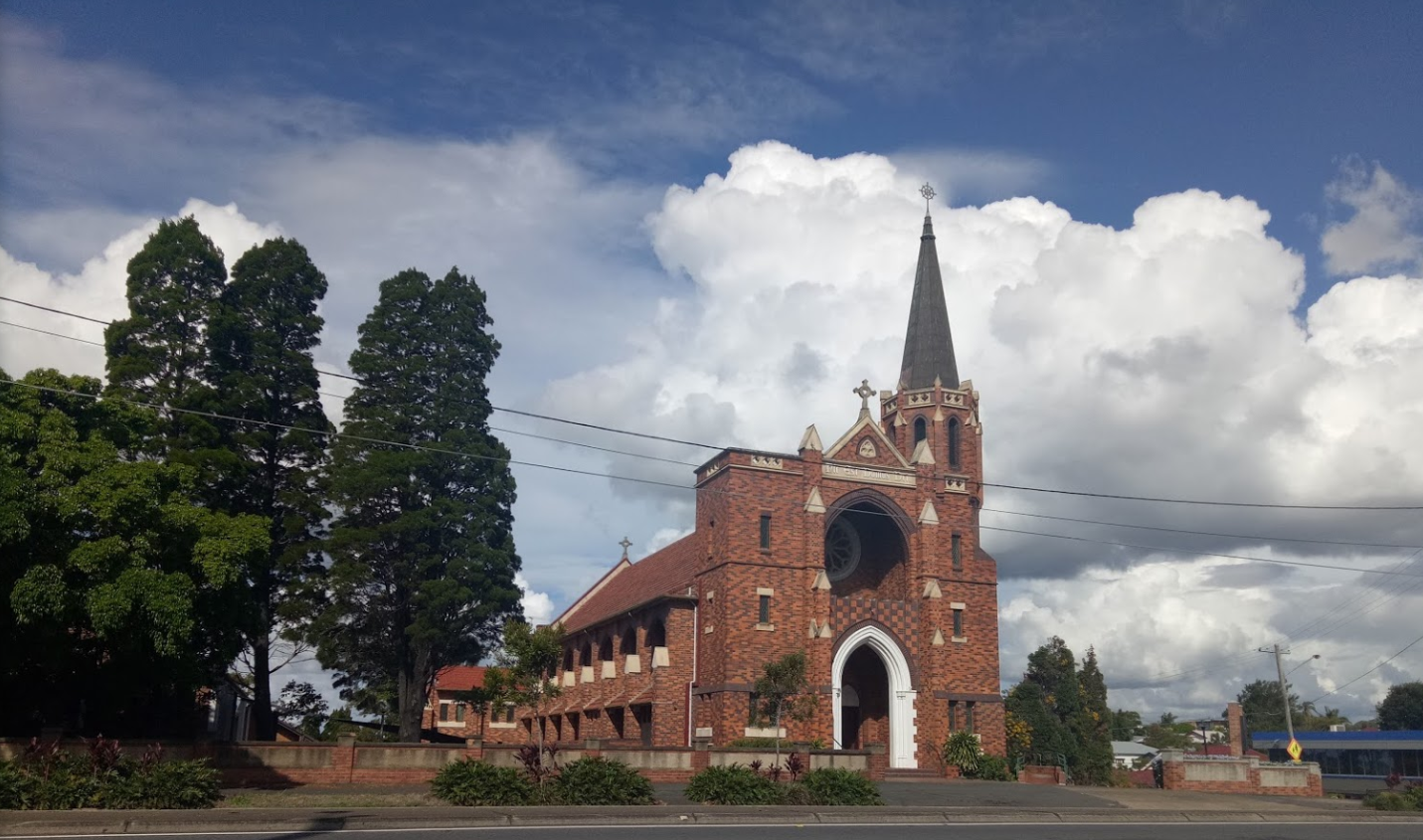
Mary Immaculate Church is a Roman Catholic church built in 1932

The original timber church was built in 1914 as a temporary building until such time something larger and more permanent could be built. In 1929 Archbishop James Duhig instructed the parish priest, Fr James Kelly to build a new church, which was dedicated by Archbishop Duhig on 1 May 1932. The current church was built during the depression, and in a great testament to the Catholic community of Annerley, provided employment for 30 men. Mary Immaculate Church is built in the French Gothic style with some notable features including an octagonal bell tower with a copper spire and a large rose window on its western face. Over the facade of the church are the Latin words Hic est Domus Dei, which translates as This is the House of God. The interior of the church has seen several changes over the years, but recently much of the interior of the church has been restored to its original design with the refurbishment of the original sanctuary floor and installation of altar rails to match those that were there originally. Mary Immaculate Church is an imposing and historically significant building in the area and a testament of faith to the people of Annerley. It is listed on the Brisbane Heritage Register.

=== Annerley Baptist Church ===
On Saturday 9 February 1935, the Annerley Baptist Church was opened on its current 470 Ipswich Road site by Reverend John Carnegie Farquhar. The church building had been relocated from Fairfield, where it had formerly been the Fairfield Baptist Church. The church building had first opened for worship in Fairfield on 24 December (Christmas Eve) 1865 followed by a celebratory luncheon on 26 December (Boxing Day) as a branch of the Vulture Street Baptist Church. Located on the south-western corner of Dudley Street and Lang Street (now Lagonda Street) approximately 1/4 mile (0.40 km) west of Ipswich Road, it was large enough to accommodate 90 to 100 people. In 1888 a larger building was erected. The church was established and operated by brothers George and Samuel Grimes, until 1906 when Reverend Thomas Edward Ashworth was appointed as the first minister. By 1927 it was decided that the church needed a more prominent location, and in 1928 a property on Ipswich Road was purchased for £1,625. During 1934 services were held in the church hall while the church building was being relocated to the Ipswich Road site and refurbished. The last service was held at Fairfield on 9 December 1934. The official re-opening of the church at Ipswich Road was on 9 February 1935, but some services and functions had taken place at Ipswich Road prior to this.

The appointment of Reverend Chester Hope Eric Martin in July 1938 led to the commencement of an outreach program, starting with the establishment of a Sunday School in Fairfield and in 1940 a building was erected as a hall in which services were held. The success of establishing a Sunday School at the Tarragindi State School, led to the purchase of land in Tarragindi and the relocation of a building to serve as a hall. The church hall at Tarragindi officially opened on 14 February 1953, becoming a church in its own right on 12 August 1956. Land was also acquired in Salisbury and a hall established there, becoming a church on 24 June 1956.

The Billy Graham Crusade in 1959 had a great impact on the church and its work.

The foundation stone of the current brick Annerley Baptist Church building on the Ipswich Road site was unveiled on 13 March 1965 by Philip Joseph Hancox, President of the Baptist Union of Queensland. On Saturday 26 June 1965, Hancox returned to open and dedicate the new church building.

=== Annerley Library ===
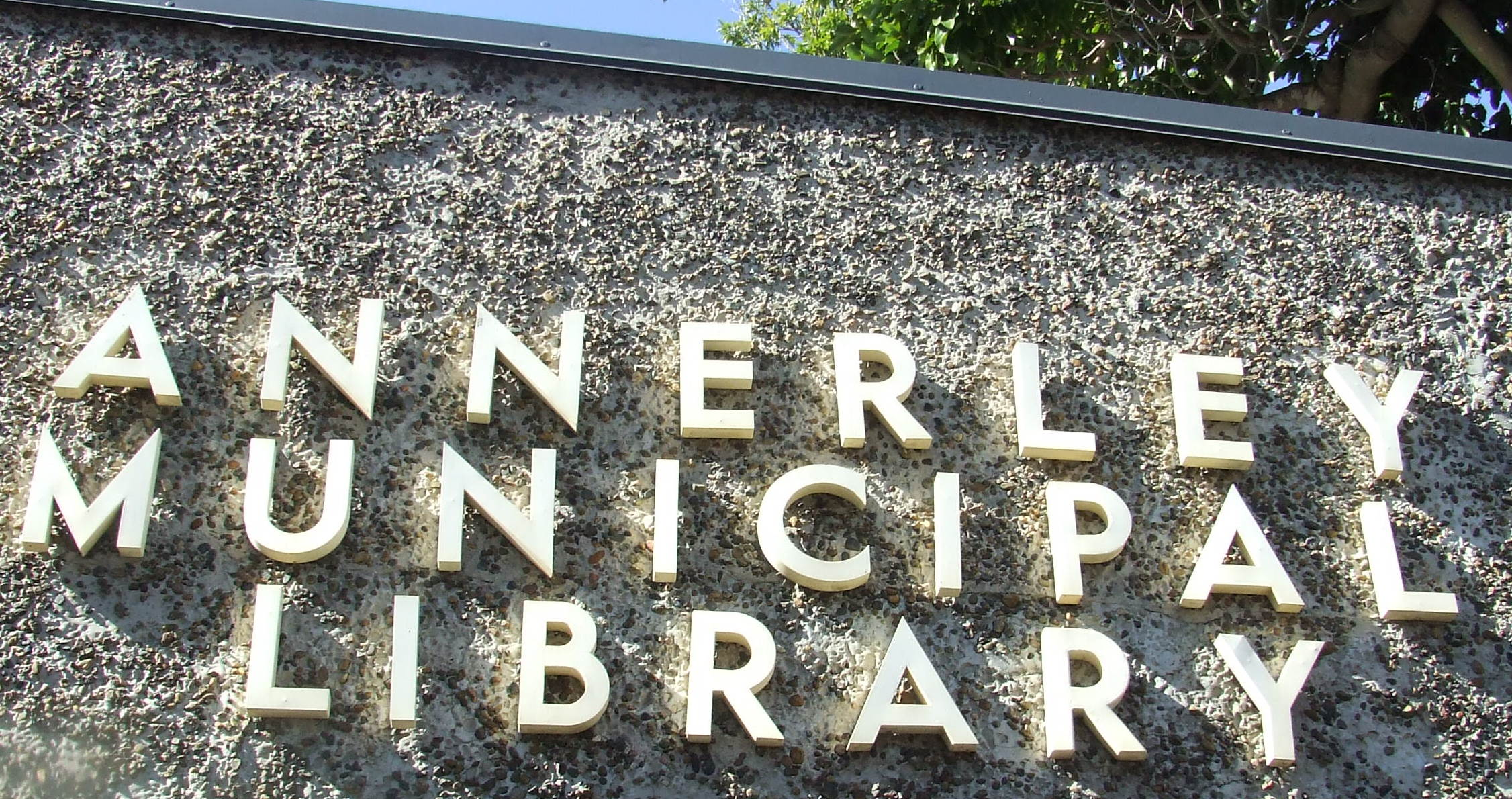
Annerley Library sign (from Ipswich Road)

The Annerley public library was opened in 1957 at 448 Ipswich Road. It was designed in 1956 by architect James Birrell and is listed on the Brisbane Heritage Register.

=== Our Lady's College ===
In 1964, the Sisters of St Joseph also opened a secondary school for girls called Our Lady's College. Since 1976, the school has been operated by Brisbane Catholic Education.

== Demographics ==
In the 2011 census, Annerley recorded a population of 10,664 people, 50.2% female and 49.8% male. The median age of the Annerley population was 32 years, 5 years below the national median of 37. 62.1% of people living in Annerley were born in Australia, compared to the national average of 69.8%; the next most common countries of birth were India 3.6%, New Zealand 3.5%, England 3%, China 1.6%, Vietnam 1.5%. 70.1% of people spoke only English at home; the next most popular languages were 2.2% Mandarin, 2% Greek, 1.8% Vietnamese, 1.2% Malayalam, 1.2% Cantonese.

In the 2016 census, Annerley had a population of 11,336 people.

In the 2021 census, Annerley had a population of 11,891 people.

== Heritage listings ==
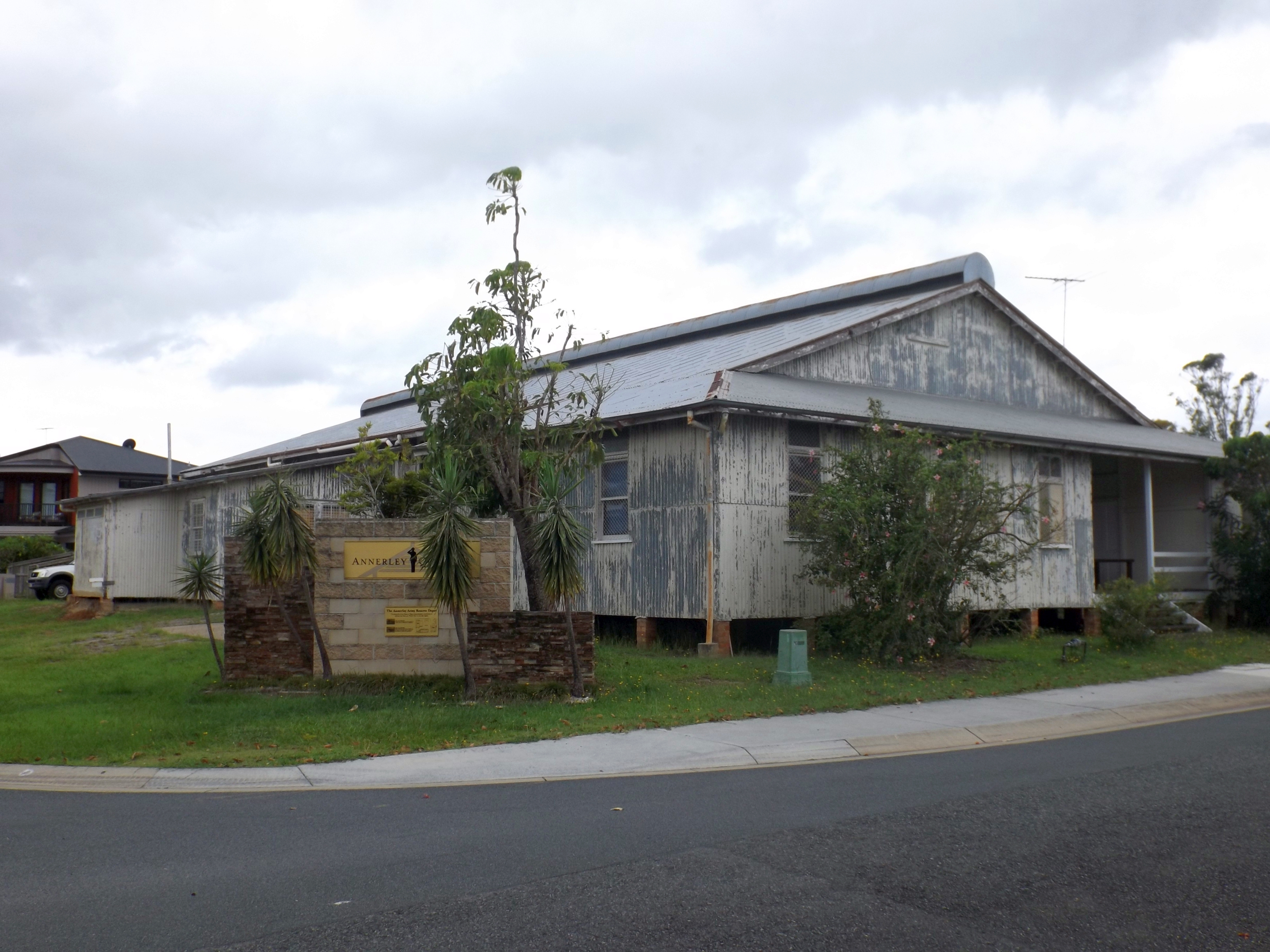
Annerley Army Reserve Depot, 2015

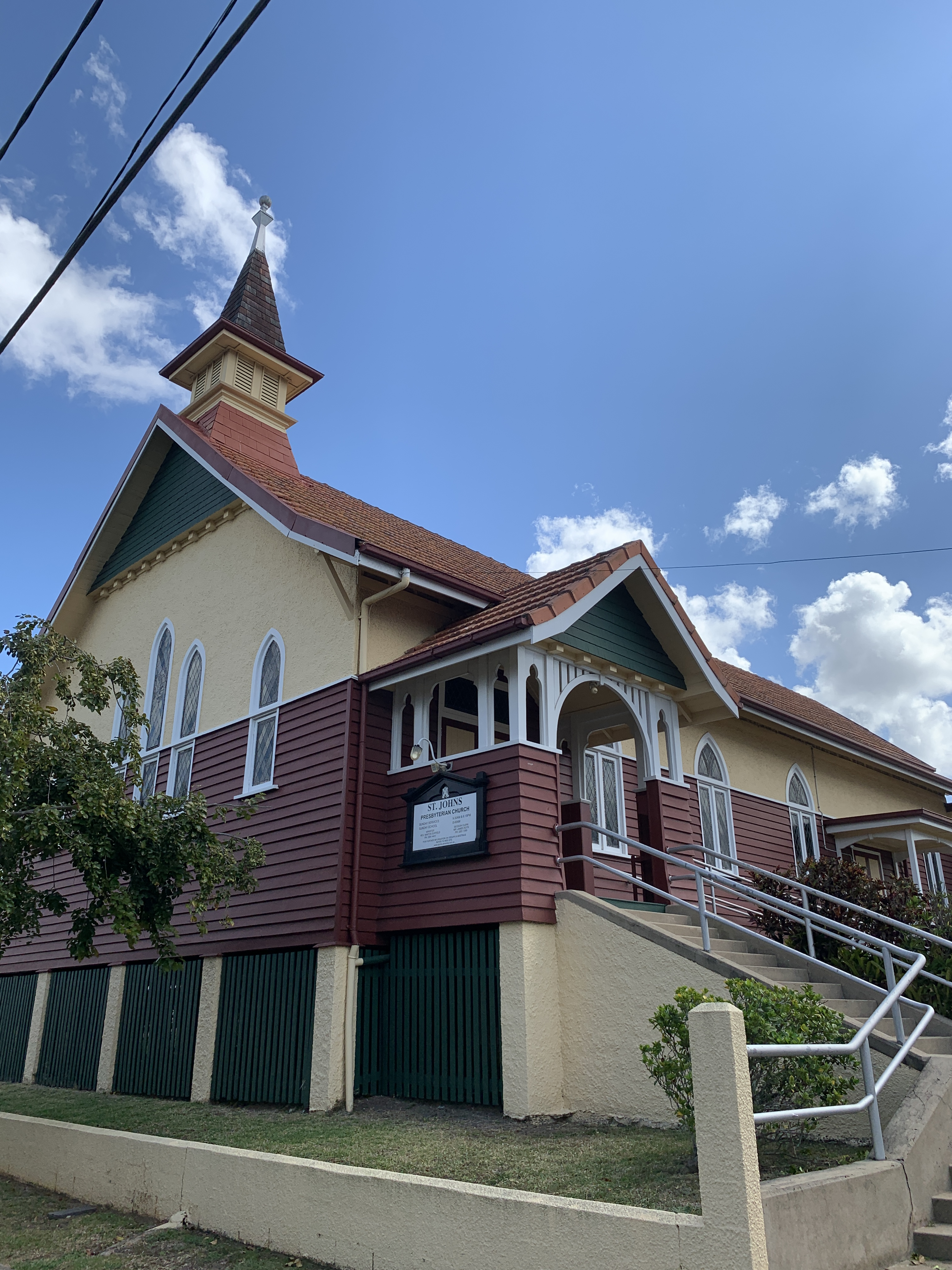
St John's Presbyterian Church, 2020

There are a number of heritage-listed sites in Annerley, including:

- Hefferan Park Air Raid Shelter, 260 Annerley Road
- Ingleside, former residence of Digby Denham, Premier of Queensland, 391 Annerley Road
- Residence, 34 Brisbane Street
- Apostolic church (formerly Methodist church), 151 Cornwall Street (corner King Street)
- Brisbane Fijian Uniting Church (also known as the Annerley Uniting Church and originally as Cracknell Road Congregational Church), 29 Cracknell Road
- Residence “Runnymede”, 75 Cracknell Road
- former Annerley Army Reserve Depot, 158 Dudley Street
- former Stephens Shire office, 15 Ealing Street
- Residence, 68 Emperor Street
- Tram substation (part of the infrastructure of Brisbane's former tramways, now used as a hotel restaurant), 413 Ipswich Road
- Fig tree (the sole survivor of an avenue of fig trees planted on Ipswich Road in Annerley between 1911 and 1955), 413 Ipswich Road
- Police Station (built in 1925 and still in use as a police station), 444 Ipswich Road
- Annerley Library & Community Centre, 448 Ipswich Road
- Mary Immaculate Catholic Church (a notable city landmark due to its prominent position and its imposing interwar Gothic architecture), 616 Ipswich Road
- Shops, 770 Ipswich Road
- Residence, 22 Junction Terrace
- Residence, 23 Junction Terrace
- St John's Presbyterian Church, 23 King Street
- Residence, 20 Laurier Street
- former Stephen's Farm Homestead, 35 Waldheim Street
- Junction Park State School, 50 Waldheim Street
- Residence Cambrae, 6 Young Street
- Residence Cockerill, 11 Young Street
- Duplex Coombie, 12 Young Street
- Residence, 17 Young Street
- Duplex Kama Lodge, 34 Young Street

In addition there are many period homes, which, although not heritage-listed, contribute to the aesthetics of the suburb, including:

- Rockmont (house), 607 Ipswich Road

== Education ==
Junction Park State School is a government primary (Prep-6) school for boys and girls at 50 Waldheim Street (27.5099°S 153.0353°E). In 2012, the school had an enrolment of 373 students with 29 teachers (22.9 full-time equivalent). In 2018, the school had an enrolment of 476 students with 39 teachers (32 full-time equivalent) and 19 non-teaching staff (12 full-time equivalent). It includes a special education program.

Mary Immaculate Primary School is a Catholic primary (Prep-6) school for boys and girls at 616 Ipswich Road (27.5159°S 153.0303°E). In 2013, the school had an enrolment of 140 students with 17 teachers (10.9 full-time equivalent). In 2018, the school had an enrolment of 114 students with 18 teachers (12 full-time equivalent) and 9 non-teaching staff (4 full-time equivalent). The school's long-standing nickname is Mary Mac or Marymac, so much so that Marymac was chosen as the official name of the community hall on the school's site.

Our Lady's College is a Catholic secondary (7-12) school for girls at 15 Chester Road (27.5156°S 153.0319°E). In 2013, the school had an enrolment of 347 students with 32 teachers (32.68 full-time equivalent). In 2018, the school had an enrolment of 327 students with 31 teachers (30 full-time equivalent) and 16 non-teaching staff (12 full-time equivalent).

There is no government secondary school in Annerley. The nearest government secondary school is Yeronga State High School in neighbouring Yeronga to the south-west.

== Amenities ==
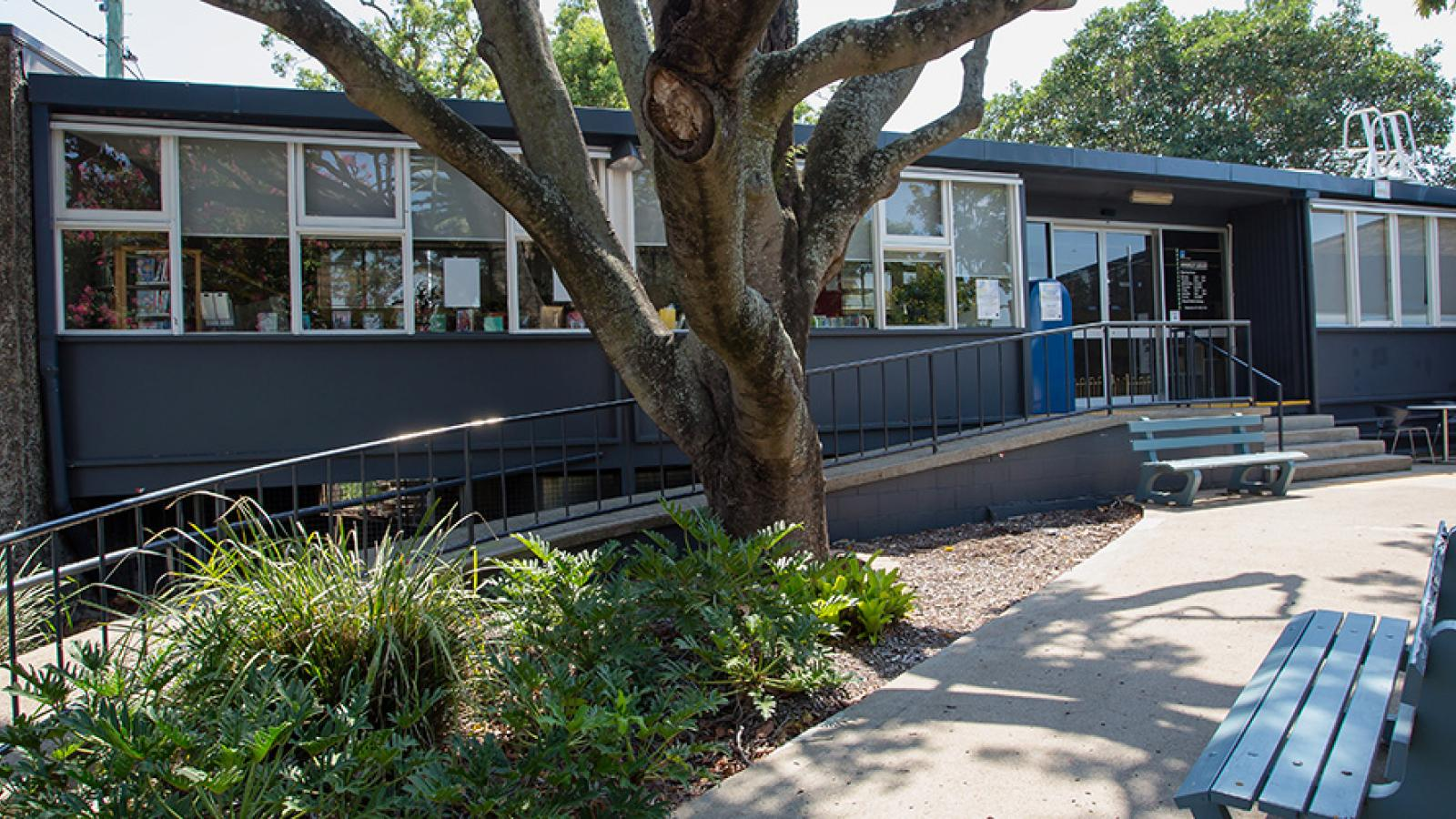
Annerley Library, entrance

The Brisbane City Council operates the Annerley public library at 448 Ipswich Road (27.5094°S 153.0333°E).

Mary Immaculate Church is a heritage-listed Roman Catholic church situated within the Archdiocese of Brisbane. The church is located on the corner of Ipswich Road and Ferndale Street (27.5168°S 153.0303°E).

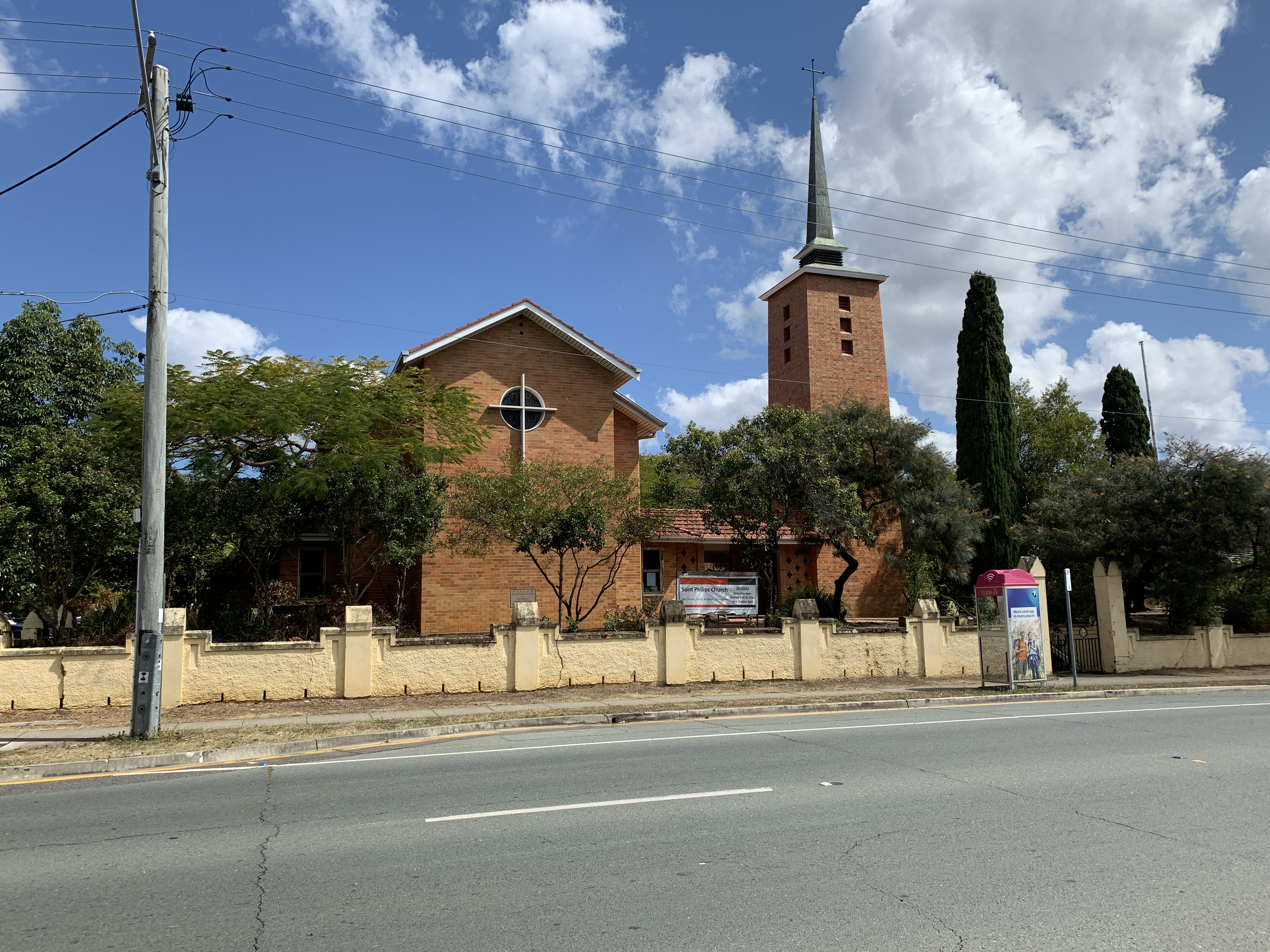
St Philip's Anglican Church, 2020

St Philip's Anglican church is at 115 Cornwall Street (27.5015°S 153.0369°E). The Brisbane congregation of the Mar Thoma Church also hold their services at St Philip's.

St John's Presbyterian Church at 23 King Street (27.5027°S 153.0368°E) and conducts Sunday services. It is a congregation of the Presbyterian Church of Australia.

Brisbane Fijian Uniting Church (also known as Annerley Uniting Church and Stephens Fijian Uniting Church) is at 29 Cracknell Road (27.5189°S 153.0307°E). It is part of the South Moreton Presbytery of the Uniting Church in Australia. It holds Sunday services, in English in the morning and in Fijian in the afternoon.

Annerley Church of Christ conducts Sunday services in English, Spanish, and Farsi at 459 Annerley Road (27.5093°S 153.0324°E).

Annerley Baptist Church is at 560 Ipswich Road (27.5132°S 153.0316°E). The Westside Tongan Church conduct their services at the Baptist Church; it is part of the Wesleyan Methodist Church.

Annerley Apostolic Church is 151 Cornwall Street (27.5019°S 153.0389°E).

== Events ==
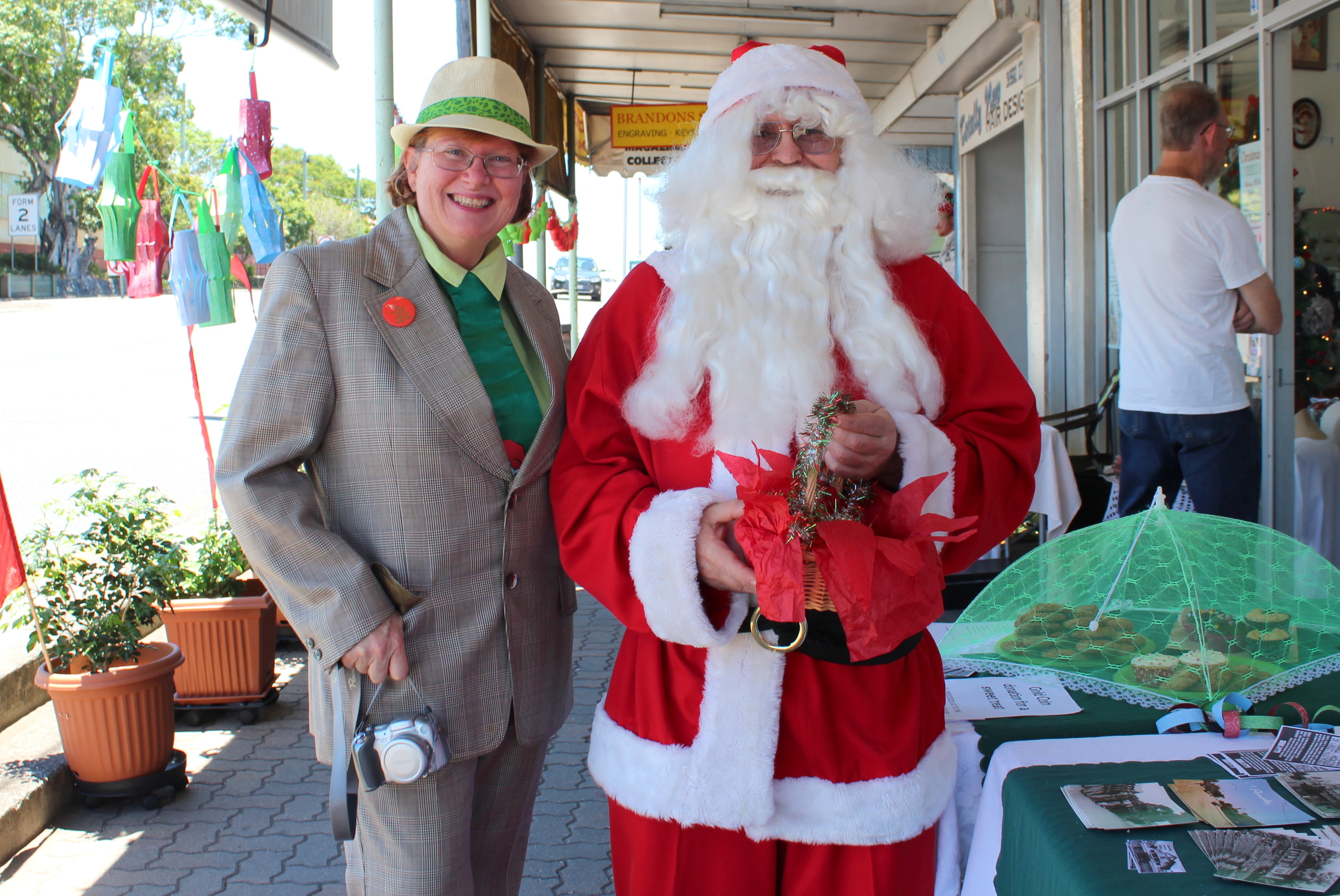
Annerley Junction Christmas Fair, 2013

Annerley Junction now hosts a number of yearly events which are organised by the Annerley Junction Traders' Association. The first Christmas event "Junction Fair" was first hosted on 8 December 2012. The first "Junction Jumble Sale" was held on 22 June 2012. Both events were more successful than expected and Junction Fair was rebranded as the "Annerley Junction Christmas Fair" and was held on 7 December 2013.

The annual Annerley Junction Fest now occurs on the second Saturday of October and includes a children’s area, fashion Parades, Art show, food and market stalls and a short film competition.

== Notable residents ==
- Digby Denham, 18th Premier of Queensland lived at Ingleside, 391 Annerley Road
- Ken Fletcher, Australian tennis player who won numerous doubles and mixed doubles Grand Slam titles was born in Annerley Junction
- Ainsley Gotto, political secretary and interior designer born here in 14 February 1946
- Hugh Lunn, Journalist and writer lived at 484 Ipswich Rd in the 'Lunns for Buns' cake shop made famous in his autobiographical novel,"Over the Top with Jim"
