= Annerley Army Reserve Depot =

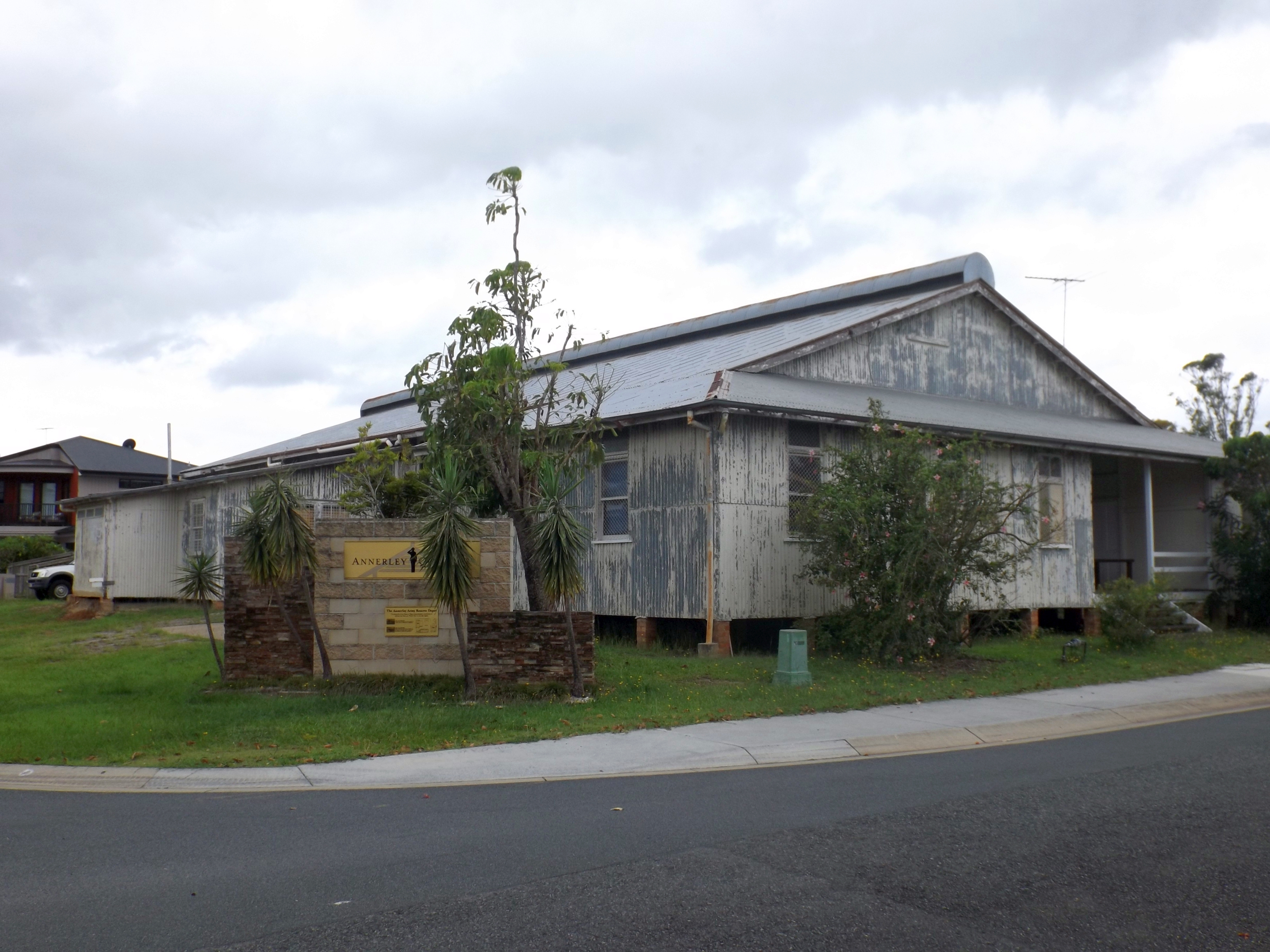
- Structure in 2015

- Location within Queensland Location within Australia
- 27.511°S 153.0368°E
- Location: 158 Dudley Street, Annerley, City of Brisbane, Queensland, Australia

History
- Design period: 1914–1919 (World War I)
- Built: 1914–1954

Queensland Heritage Register
- Official name: Annerley Army Reserve Depot (former)
- Type: state heritage (built)
- Designated: 7 February 2005
- Reference no.: 602216
- Significant period: 1910s, 1950s (fabric); 1910s–1960s (historical)
- Significant components: other – defence: component, wall/s – retaining, trees/plantings, toilet block/earth closet/water closet, parade ground/quadrangle/assembly ground, hall – drill

Annerley Army Reserve Depot is a heritage-listed barracks at 158 Dudley Street, Annerley, City of Brisbane, Queensland, Australia. It was built from 1914 to 1954. It was added to the Queensland Heritage Register on 7 February 2005.

== History ==
The drill halls at Annerley were constructed in 1914 and 1954 to designs prepared by the Office of Queensland Government Architect, Department of Public Works.

Volunteer military forces have played a central role in the organisation of the defence of Queensland. Volunteer units were formed from 1860 onwards and regular training camps were organised as citizen soldiers became the foundation of the State's defence. The first Easter encampment of the Queensland Volunteer Force was held at Toowoomba in 1875. These camps were held so that the various individual groups could train in larger numbers, a necessary requirement if they were to be an effective fighting force in the event of war.

A series of war scares in the late 1870s and an official survey of the colony's defences prepared by two military officers from England forced changes to Queensland's colonial defences. In 1884, the Defence Act was passed, completely reorganising the defence of the colony. The volunteer system was continued but augmented, with the establishment of the first permanent local force in Queensland. The permanent force included paid militia and volunteer units forces, as well as members of the Police Force Rifle Clubs. After the passing of the 1884 defence act the government authorised the construction of a large number of drill halls around the colony. Many were built in the suburbs of Brisbane, and in the major towns such as Ipswich, Warwick, Gympie, Rockhampton, Mackay, Townsville and Cairns. Approximately 30 halls were constructed after 1884 and towards the turn of the century for the militia units.

In 1901, the new Commonwealth Of Australia was formed. The Commonwealth government thereafter assumed control of a number of formerly colonial responsibilities, including defence. An amendment to the Defence Act provided for compulsory drilling for boys aged twelve to eighteen and annual training for youths aged eighteen to twenty. The amendment was implemented in 1911 The initial training groups in 1911 numbered over 90,000 youths and the size of the defence grew from 23,506 in 1910 to 60,972 in 1915.

The Department of the Army responded to these changes by providing appropriate facilities for the compulsory militia force. Drill halls had been built in Brisbane in the late 19th century, including one in Alice Street and another in Adelaide Street. Following the national growth, drill halls and parade grounds were built all over Queensland. Drill Halls were built to a standard design in central locations to provide the organisational structure and all weather sites for militia and cadet training. The Commonwealth entered into an arrangement with the states in this early period of Federation whereby the Commonwealth paid for the construction and maintenance of their buildings but the state's architects did the work.

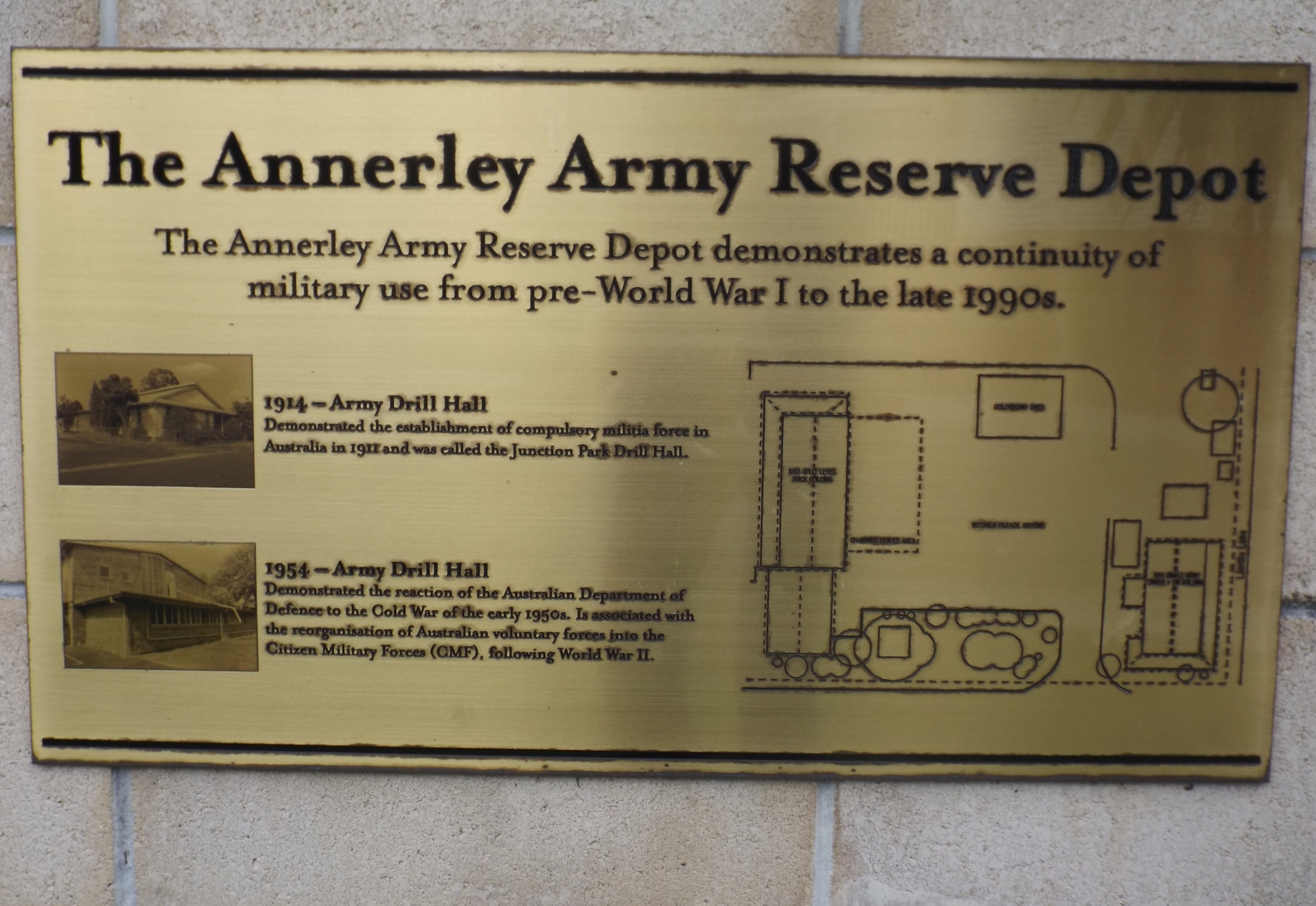
Plaque next to the building

In Queensland, the design and construction of this new batch of drill halls was undertaken by the Department of Public Works. This generation of drill halls followed the basic form of those constructed in the 19th century period. Most known examples are timber framed and sheeted with corrugated iron. Most 19th century drill halls had curved, iron framed roofs, a design unique to Queensland. Those constructed for World War I broke with this tradition, with timber-framed gabled roofs and were constructed of corrugated iron. Head Commonwealth architect, John Smith Murdoch observed in 1915:

"... the Minister of Defence laid down the principle that we were to put the cost of drill halls down to bedrock, there being so many required; and those drill halls are made of wood and iron and are found good enough..."

The Commandant of the first military district applied for suitable land to the Stephens Shire Council from late 1912 to early 1913, but was rejected on both occasions. William Stephens, son of Thomas Blacket Stephens, a Councillor with the Stephens Shire Council, offered 2.7 acres (1.1 ha) of his own land in Dudley Street for the purpose. When it was inspected, the land was found to be in a well-elevated position within easy distance of the Ipswich Road Tramway Terminus. The land was a treeless, grassed slope, without any improvements apart from a barbed wire fence around the perimeter. The Commandant recommended the land for purchase and a price of £519 was settled between the vendor and the commonwealth.

The first drill hall constructed on the Annerley site, known as the Junction Park Drill Hall, was constructed in 1914 to a design by the Office of Public Works signed by Alfred Barton Brady. Tenders were called on 24 February 1914. The cost of construction was £1625. In the Annual Report for the Public Works Department for 1915–16, works conducted to the Junction Park Drill Hall included the addition of drainage and furniture at a cost of £35/5/0. The drill hall was built in the south eastern corner of the site facing Dudley Street. Typical of drill halls at the time, the Annerley building was simple in form. It comprised a meeting hall, covered so that night time drilling could occur, with offices for each of the companies assigned to Annerley.

The site became the headquarters and offices of the 2nd Brigade Area and Machine Gun Section 2nd Light Horse, Headquarters Machine Gun Section and two companies of the Ninth Infantry, area office and store 9A and for two companies of cadets. In addition to these companies, the 3rd AMC (Field Ambulance) and the 34th AMC (Company) were also placed at the site.

By 1947, a number of outbuildings had been added to the site including, toilets and showers, a kitchen and an officer's mess. During World War II, encampments for personnel of the Australian and United States armed forces were placed wherever space could be provided. Training depots like the one at Annerley provided a range of facilities for the garrison troops. Construction of drill halls ceased at the end of World War I. By the mid-1930s, the political situation in Europe began to worsen and there was a revival of citizen forces. Following the Second World War, the Australian defence forces had a major overhaul. The existing situation, where a small core of professional officers was supplemented by a volunteer force, was deemed unsatisfactory for the national force. In September 1947, the Australian Regular Army was created as a body of full-time professional soldiers. The Australian Military Forces, the existing organisation of part-time soldiers, was retained but renamed the Citizens Military Forces (CMF). The National Service Scheme, requiring all 18-year-old males to register for one year of military service and further part-time service, was introduced in 1951. This ensured that the number of participants in the CMF would grow. At this time, the Annerley site was renamed the Annerley CMF Training Depot. The army needed new or upgraded facilities to cater for these major changes. Resources were generally directed to facilities for the regular army and very few drill halls were constructed in the 1950s. Only six were built in Queensland at this time, one of which was the drill hall at Annerley (1954).

Plans to upgrade the Annerley facility were drawn up in 1953. The 1952–53 Works Program allocated £20,000 for the first phase of redevelopment of the CMF training depot at Annerley. Plans included designs for a multi-purpose drill hall with company stores and offices and an attached annexe for showers and latrines and quartermaster's store. The siting of the building on the western boundary of the land allowed a metalled parade ground to be prepared between the original drill hall and the modern one. In 1964, additional accommodation for officers was added by creating a mezzanine floor in the drill hall space. The mezzanine floor included extra offices, a theatrette, a lecture room and officers' and sergeants' messes.

The place is no longer owned by the Department of Defence. In 2004 the Queensland Heritage Council approved the adaptive reuse of the place for residential purposes, including subdivision, constructions of new dwellings and demolition of ancillary structures.

== Description ==
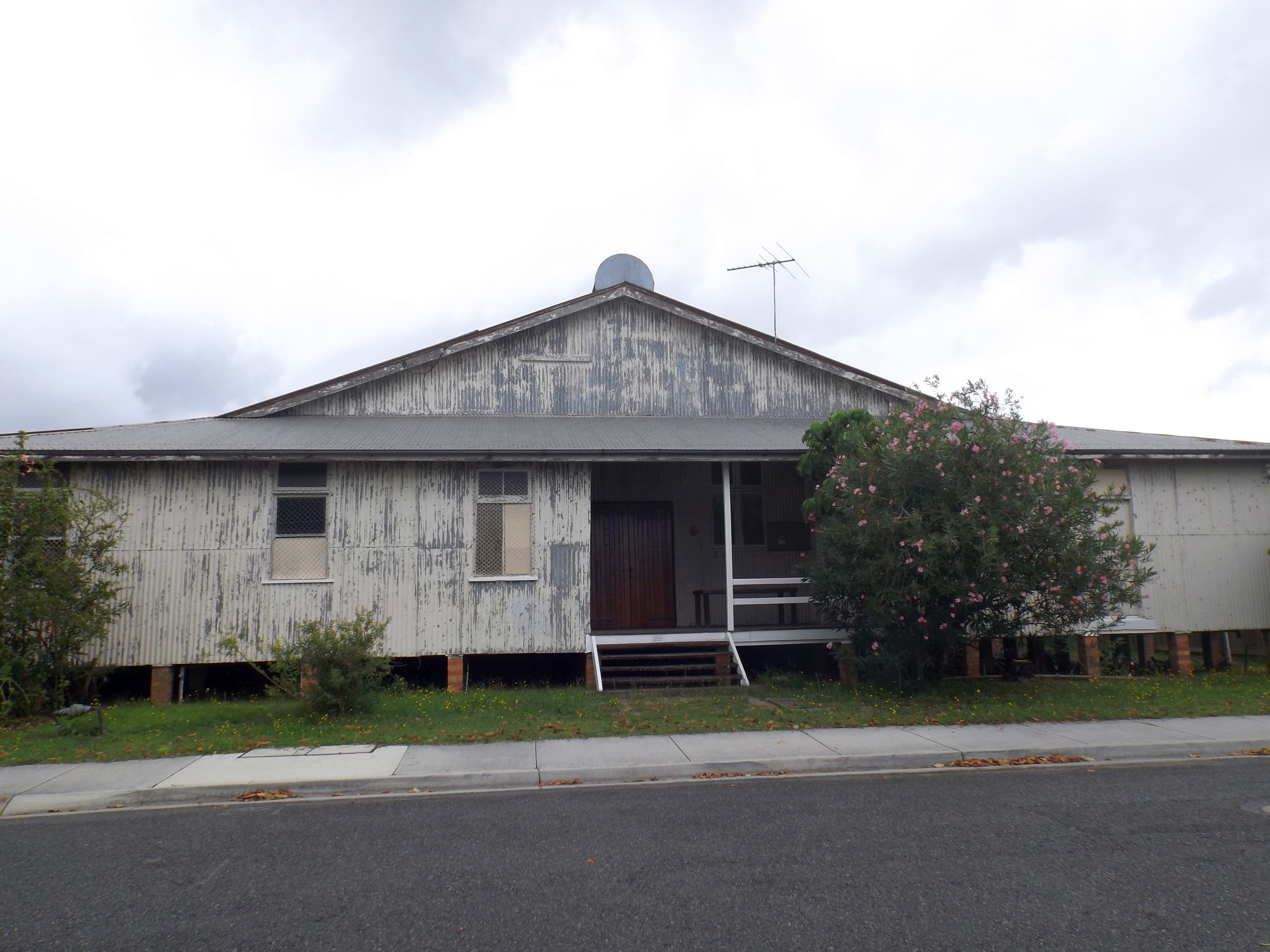
Front of the building, 2015

The rectangular site has a long frontage to Dudley Street to the south, with a wide, gated entrance through the galvanised pipe and chain wire fence. To the east the site is bounded by Linville Lane. The principal buildings on the site are the two drill halls – constructed in 1914 and 1954.

The 1914 drill hall is generally similar to others built around the same time in Queensland, such as those at Roma and Ayr. It is a simple gable roofed building enclosing a single large space. Small offices are ranged along the east of the large space.

The building is framed with timber, with corrugated galvanised iron sheeting and timber boarded lining. The corrugated iron roof is supported by timber and angled steel trusses. A ventilator, covered with curved corrugated sheeting, runs the full length of the ridge. The timber floor is raised a short distance from the ground. The windows are predominantly double hung timber sashes.

The standard plan of the drill hall has only been slightly modified. The principal alterations to the building include the addition of a verandah with flanking enclosures at the south end, forming an entrance porch facing Dudley Street. This addition was placed by 1935. A small skillion roofed annexe in the middle of the west wall after 1935.

The 1954 drill hall building consists of two sections – the drill hall to the north and a wing to the south containing bathrooms, toilets and stores, including the armoury, located in the south east corner of the building. In place above some doors in the southern section of the building are original timber signage. A substantial brick-walled foyer links the two sections. Double timber glazed doors are located at either end of the foyer. The floor is timber laid over concrete – a standard feature of drill hall design during the period. Along the western elevation (rear) of the building, the joinery is steel and in the eastern elevation, facing the parade ground, the joinery is timber.

The northern section, as first built, contained a large tall space about 37 metres (121 ft) long and 15 metres (49 ft) wide. Six large roller doors open out on the eastern side onto the parade ground. Smaller offices range along the north and west of the hall. In 1964, a mezzanine floor, covering more than half the floor area of the drill hall, was added. On the mezzanine are former offices, messes, a lecture room and a theatrette.

Other buildings on the site include the a toilet block (1913) with a gable roof and clad with corrugated iron. A second brick toilet block, kitchen and shower block is located along the Linville Lane side of the property. Also located in the north-eastern corner of the site include a small brick building which originally stored inflammable liquid and a demountable building. A large skillion roofed shed sheeted with ribbed colourbond metal, with a roller shutter door is located along the Waldheim Street side to the north of the parade ground.

An open bitumen sealed parade ground is in the centre of the site, with the various buildings arranged around three of its perimeters. On the south, the parade ground is separated from the street by a belt of mature camphor laurel trees. Other mature trees include a mango in the north east corner and a jacaranda in the south east. The site has been cut to form the level parade ground, and there are battered retaining walls to the north and east.

== Heritage listing ==
The former Annerley Army Reserve Depot was listed on the Queensland Heritage Register on 7 February 2005 having satisfied the following criteria.

The place is important in demonstrating the evolution or pattern of Queensland's history.

The former Annerley Army Reserve Depot is significant in demonstrating the pattern of Queensland's history as the drill halls (1914 and 1954) located on the site are good, intact, surviving examples of their respective type and period and demonstrate the development of the site as a militia training depot, following the amendments to the Defence Act. A number of drill halls were built in Queensland, and around Australia in the period 1911–1916, in order to provide facilities for the increased number of new conscripts. The original drill hall (1914), which retains its early form, demonstrates the establishment of compulsory militia force in Australia in 1911. This scheme is visible in the fabric and layout of the drill hall and the parade ground.

Construction of the second drill hall in 1954 is associated with the reorganisation of Australian voluntary forces into the Citizen Military Forces (CMF), following World War II, and demonstrates the reaction of the Australian Department of Defence to the Cold War of the early 1950s.

The place demonstrates rare, uncommon or endangered aspects of Queensland's cultural heritage.

The Annerley Army Reserve Depot is significant in that the place demonstrates a continuity of military use from pre-World War I to the late 1990s. The combination of World War I and post-World War II drill halls located at the same site is significant for its rarity in Australia and particularly in Queensland. Together, the 1913 and the 1954 drill halls demonstrate the continued use of a standard drill hall design in Australia, often modified only slightly, for over 100 years.

The place is important in demonstrating the principal characteristics of a particular class of cultural places.

The two main buildings on the site are significant as good, intact examples of the types of drill halls built by the commonwealth government during their respective periods of construction. In the 1914 drill hall, the use of corrugated iron and timber was in response to a need for the buildings to be constructed efficiently and economically. Two standard designs were used, only varying in size.

The 1914 building is one of six that survive in Queensland, the others being located at Toowoomba (relocated), Albion, Kelvin Grove (ex-Toowong), Maryborough and Rockhampton (ex-Mt Morgan). These buildings were all to a standard design with offices running down one side, clad in corrugated galvanised iron with open angle steel roof trusses and pivoting timber windows and timber floors.

The Annerley building is unusual as it has eight bays. It is significant as an example of one of the larger types of drill halls found in Australia. Drill halls from the mid-1950s period were constructed to a standard design with some variations in each state relating to configuration and materials.

The associated outbuildings on the site, including a kitchen, showers and latrines and various storage facilities provide further evidence of the use of the site and the manner in which the participants spent time in the compound.

The place has a strong or special association with a particular community or cultural group for social, cultural or spiritual reasons.

Until recently, the Australian Army has continuously used the site since the early 20th century. Whilst the numbers of servicemen and women who may have visited and trained at the site cannot be ascertained, their association with the depot is certain.

The place has a special association with the life or work of a particular person, group or organisation of importance in Queensland's history.

Until recently, the Australian Army has continuously used the site since the early 20th century. Whilst the numbers of servicemen and women who may have visited and trained at the site cannot be ascertained, their association with the depot is certain.
