= Shire of Stephens =

Coordinates: 27°30′41.5″S 153°01′53.7″E

Shire of Stephens Queensland
- Population: 12,403 (1923 est.)
  - Density: 539/km^{2} (1,397/sq mi)
- Established: 1886
- Area: 23 km^{2} (8.9 sq mi)
- Council seat: Annerley
- Region: Brisbane

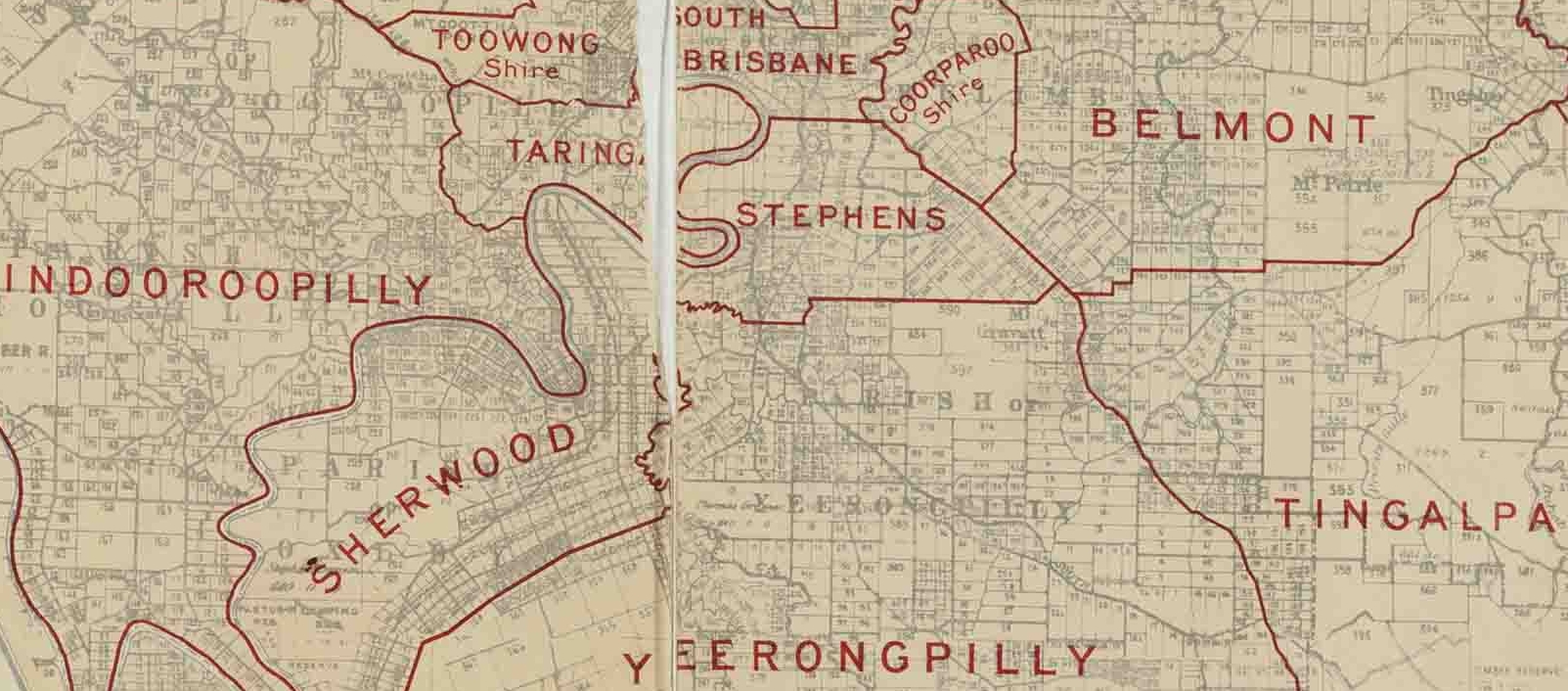
Map of Stephens Division and adjacent local government areas, March 1902

The Shire of Stephens was a local government area in the inner southern suburbs of Brisbane, Queensland, Australia. The shire, administered from Annerley, covered an area of 9 square miles (23 km^{2}), and existed as a local government entity from 1886 until 1925, when it was amalgamated into the City of Brisbane under the City of Brisbane Act 1924.

== History ==
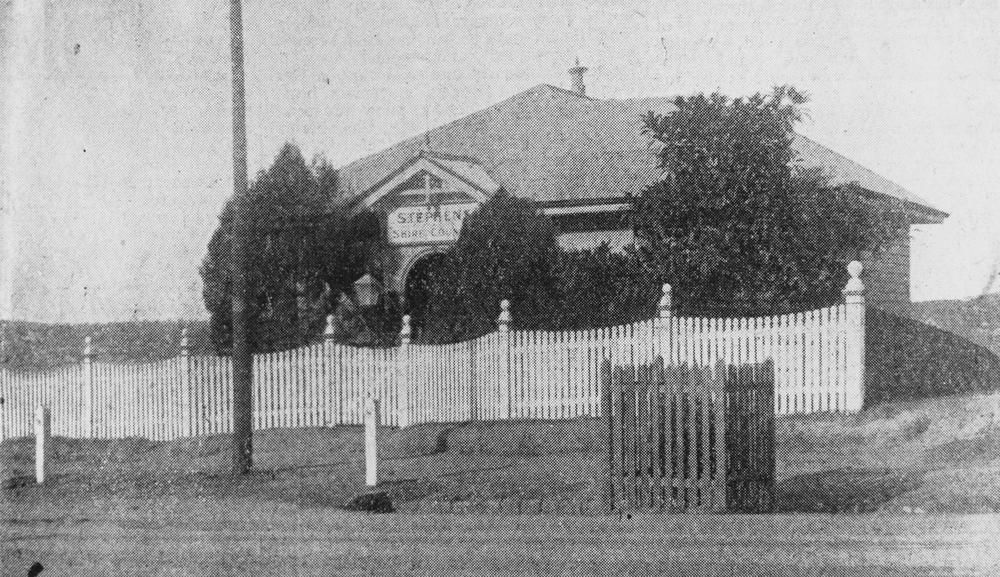
Stephens Shire Council Office, 1906

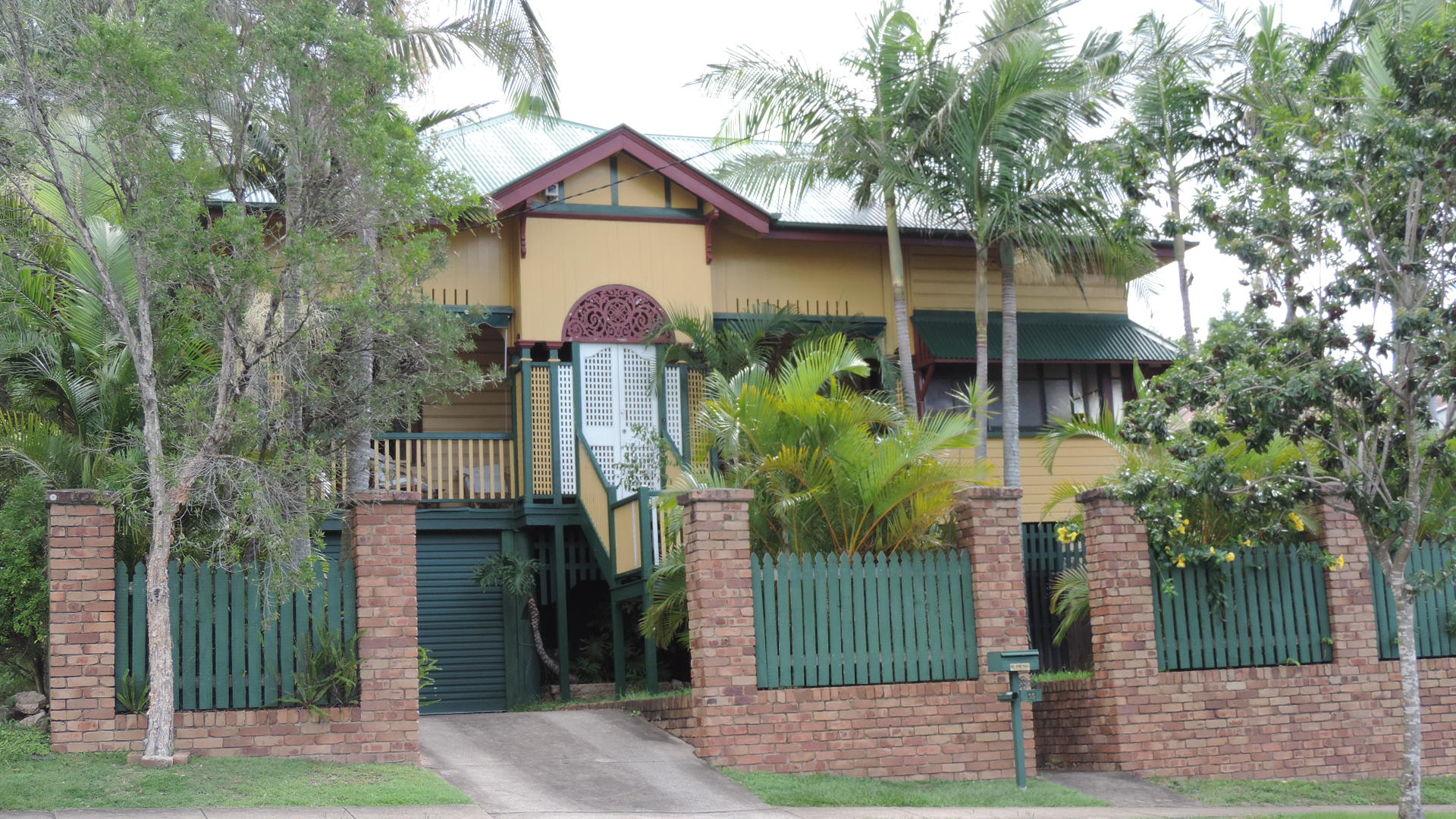
Former Stephens Shire offices, now a residence at 15 Ealing Street, Annerley, 2014

On 11 November 1879, the Yeerongpilly Division was created as one of 74 divisions within Queensland under the Divisional Boards Act 1879. On 14 October 1886, following a successful petition from ratepayers to create a new division, Stephens Division was severed from subdivision No. 1 of Yeerongpilly Division. It had a board of six members (3 being elected by each of 2 subdivisions); the first board elections were held in February 1887.

With the passage of the Local Authorities Act 1902, Stephens Division became the Shire of Stephens on 31 March 1903.

A major project undertaken by the shire was the creation of the Yeronga Memorial Park. The land (bounded by Ipswich Road, Villa Street, Park Road & School Road) was originally set aside in 1882 as a recreational reserve. Between 1917 and 1921 the shire redeveloped the park as a memorial to local participation in World War I, 14% of the population having enlisted for military service. The park is listed on both the Queensland Heritage Register and the Brisbane Heritage Register.

In 1923 the Stephens Croquet Club was established in the Yeronga Memorial Park consisting of two lawns and a clubhouse.

The offices for the shire were located on Ipswich Road, between Victoria Terrace and Junction Terrace. In 1923, it was planned to develop a new council chambers, offices and a School of Arts, but this was delayed given the proposal to create Greater Brisbane which would have resulted in the abolition of Stephens Shire.

On 1 October 1925, the Shire of Stephens was abolished and its area became part of the new City of Brisbane.

The shire offices and associated land were sold in 1929. The building was relocated to the rear of the block and turned to face the street behind (its street address is now 15 Ealing Street) and was altered for use as a residence. It is listed on the Brisbane Heritage Register.

The name Stephens survives in the Stephens Croquet Club which continues to operate under that name.

== Chairmen and presidents ==
- 1903: P. Marshall
- 1905, and another year between 1904 and 1907: Alexander McNab
- 1906: H. W. Luya
- 1908: Mr McCosker
- 1925: F. A. Stimson
- George Grimes

== Population ==
The population of Stephen Shire was:

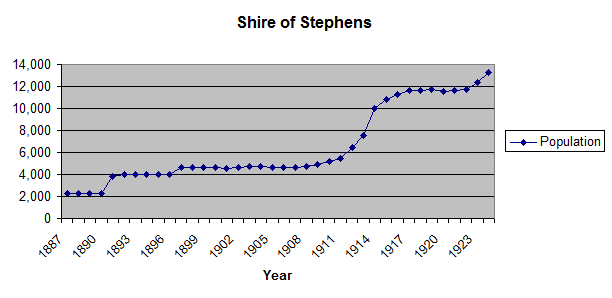
Population-of-Shire-of-Stephens

Year	Population
1887	2,310
1888	2,310
1889	2,310
1890	2,310
1891	3,782
1892	4,000
1893	4,000
1894	4,000
1895	4,000
1896	4,000
1897	4,620
1898	4,600
1899	4,630
1900	4,600
1901	4,513
1902	4,600
1903	4,700
1904	4,700
1905	4,650
1906	4,650
1907	4,670
1908	4,720
1909	4,870
1910	5,200
1911	5,415
1912	6,500
1913	7,518
1914	9,982
1915	10,774
1916	11,297
1917	11,625
1918	11,636
1919	11,700
1920	11,506
1921	11,600
1922	11,704
1923	12,403
1924	13,257

== Localities ==
- Annerley
- Fairfield
- Greenslopes (split with Shire of Coorparoo)
- Holland Park West
- Moorooka
- Tarragindi (split with Shire of Yeerongpilly)
- Yeerongpilly (split with Shire of Yeerongpilly)
- Yeronga
