= Shire of Yeerongpilly =

Coordinates: 27°32′09.84″S 153°00′02.5″E

Shire of Yeerongpilly Queensland
- Population: 3,500 (1923 est.)
  - Density: 7.69/km^{2} (19.92/sq mi)
- Established: 1879
- Area: 455 km^{2} (175.7 sq mi)
- Council seat: Rocklea
- Region: Brisbane

The Shire of Yeerongpilly was a local government area in the southern suburbs of Brisbane, Queensland. The shire, administered from Rocklea, covered an area of 175 square miles (453 km^{2}), and existed as a local government entity from 1879 until 1925, when it was split up following the creation of the City of Brisbane under the City of Brisbane Act 1924.

== History ==
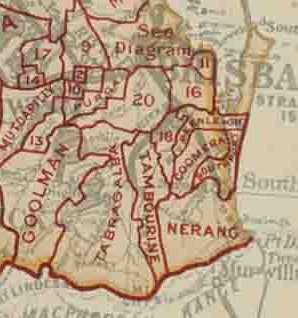
Map of Yeerongpilly Division and adjacent local government areas to the south, March 1902. Legend: Tingalpa Division (16), Waterford Division (18), Yeerongpilly Division (20)

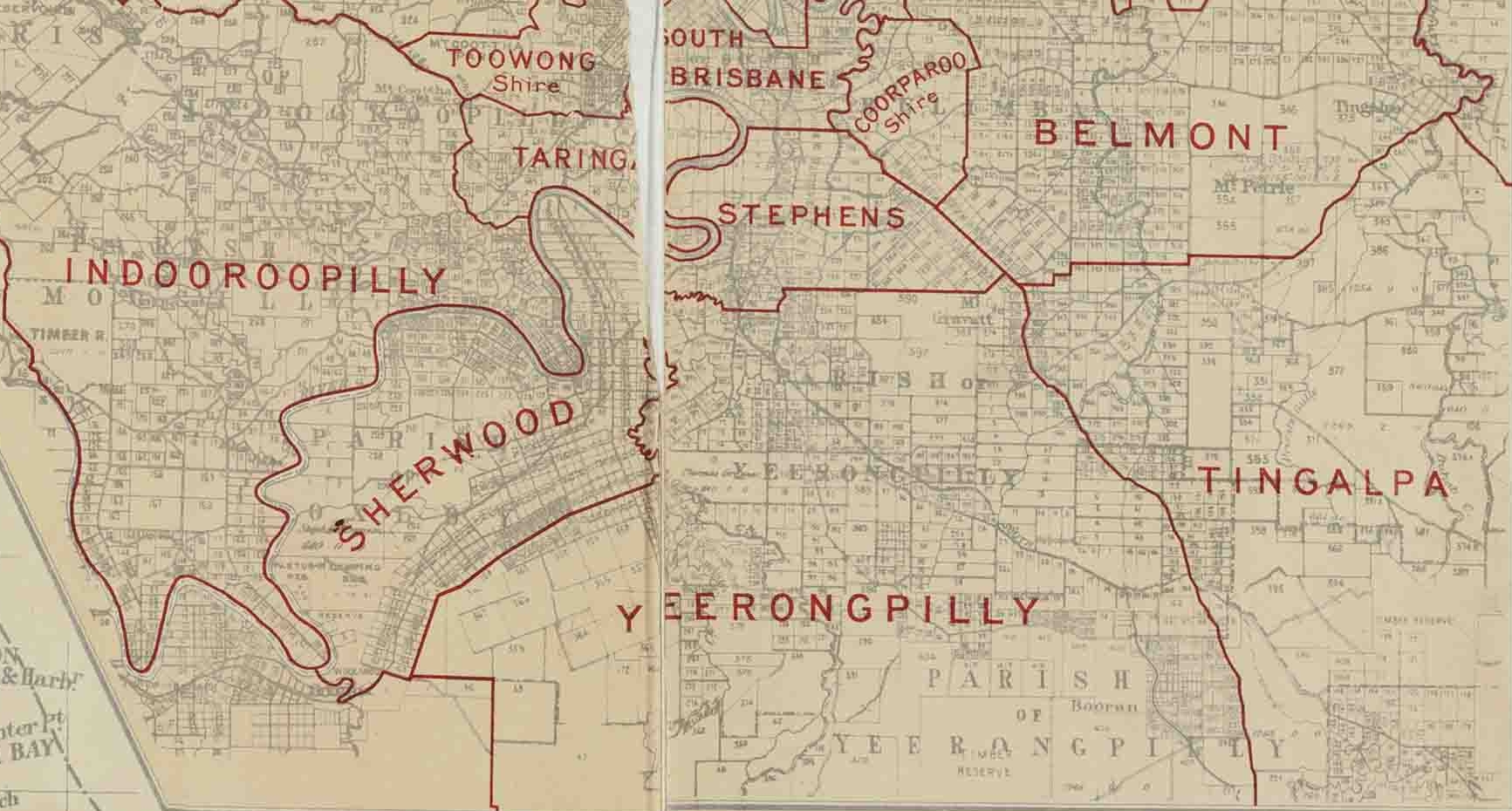
Map of Yeerongpilly Division and adjacent local government areas to the north, March 1902

On 11 November 1879, the Yeerongpilly Division was created as one of 74 divisions within Queensland under the Divisional Boards Act 1879 with a population of 3428. It included and took its name from Yeerongpilly (now a suburb of Brisbane).

On 16 October 1886, parts of Yeerongpilly Division (from South Brisbane to Rocklea and including Yeerongpilly itself) were excised to create Stephens Division (later Shire of Stephens).

On 24 January 1891, further parts of Yeerongpilly Division (west of Blunder Creek to Wacol) were excised to create Sherwood Division (later Shire of Sherwood).

With the passage of the Local Authorities Act 1902, Yeerongpilly Division became the Shire of Yeerongpilly on 31 March 1903.

On 1 October 1925, the Shire of Yeerongpilly was abolished, with its urban area becoming part of the new City of Brisbane, and the rural areas being divided between the Shires of Beaudesert, Tingalpa and Waterford.

== Population ==
Year	Population
1911	1,313
1921	3,263
1923	3,500

== Localities ==
- Rocklea
- Acacia Ridge
- Archerfield
- Berrinba
- Calamvale
- Kingston
- Tarragindi (split with Shire of Stephens)
- Woodridge
- Yeerongpilly (split with Shire of Stephens)

== Chairmen ==
The chairmen of the Yeerongpilly Shire were:

- 1888: John Moffat
- 1889: W.H. Coxen
- 1890: G. Boyland
- 1891: George Grimes
- 1892: Nicholas J. Kessels
- 1893: John Moffatt
- 1894: G. Boyland
- 1895: A. Laver
- 1896: G. Boyland
- 1897: A. Williams
- 1898: James Tuckett
- 1899: M. Moody
- 1900: M. Daly
- 1901: J. Whitfield
- 1902: A.K. Robertson
- 1903–1904: J. Whitfield
- 1905–1906: Thomas Freeney
- 1907–1908: J. Whitfield
- 1909–1910: J. McCotter
- 1911–1913: B.R. Bale
- 1914: Edwin J. Westaway
- 1915–1917: James Tuckett
- 1918–1919: J. Greer
- 1920–1923: J. McCotter
- 1924–1925: J. Cox
