= Brisbane Heritage Register =

Local heritage register in Queensland, Australia

The Brisbane Heritage Register is a heritage register of culturally and historically significant places within the City of Brisbane, Queensland, Australia. Under Section 113 of the Queensland Heritage Act 1992, all local government authorities in Queensland must maintain a local heritage register.

== Criteria ==
Listings on the Brisbane Heritage Register are made on the recommendation of the council's architects and historians in consultation with the Heritage Advisory Committee.

Places on the heritage register must satisfy one or more of these criteria:

- illustrates the evolution or pattern in local history
- has rare, uncommon or endangered aspects of cultural heritage
- aids the knowledge and understanding of local history
- illustrates the important characteristics of a particular class cultural places
- has aesthetic significance
- was very creative or technologically advanced for its period
- has special links to a particular community or cultural group
- has special links to a significant local historical person or organisation

== See also ==
- Category:Brisbane Local Heritage Register for list of sites on the Brisbane Heritage Register with Wikipedia articles
