= Department of Defense Veterinary Pathology Residency =

The Department of Defense Veterinary Pathology Residency (DODVPR), formally established in 1983 by United States Army Surgeon General Lieutenant General Bernhard Mittemeyer, resides within the Department of Veterinary Pathology at the Armed Forces Institute of Pathology (AFIP) in Washington, DC. A preceptorship program was developed in 1967 to meet the growing demand for veterinary pathologists in military medical research and diagnostic medicine. In the early 1980s, leaders of the Army veterinary pathology specialty recognized that training would be more effective and the Department of Defense better served by a formal residency program consolidating all training under one roof.^{1} Now in its 23rd year, the DODVPR is one of the largest and most successful veterinary pathology training programs in the world.

== Sources ==
- Dunn DG. Historical files of the Department of Veterinary Pathology, AFIP. These unpublished materials are maintained within the Office of the Director of Veterinary Pathology, Washington, DC.
