= Queensland Stock Institute =

Government research facility, 1893–1910

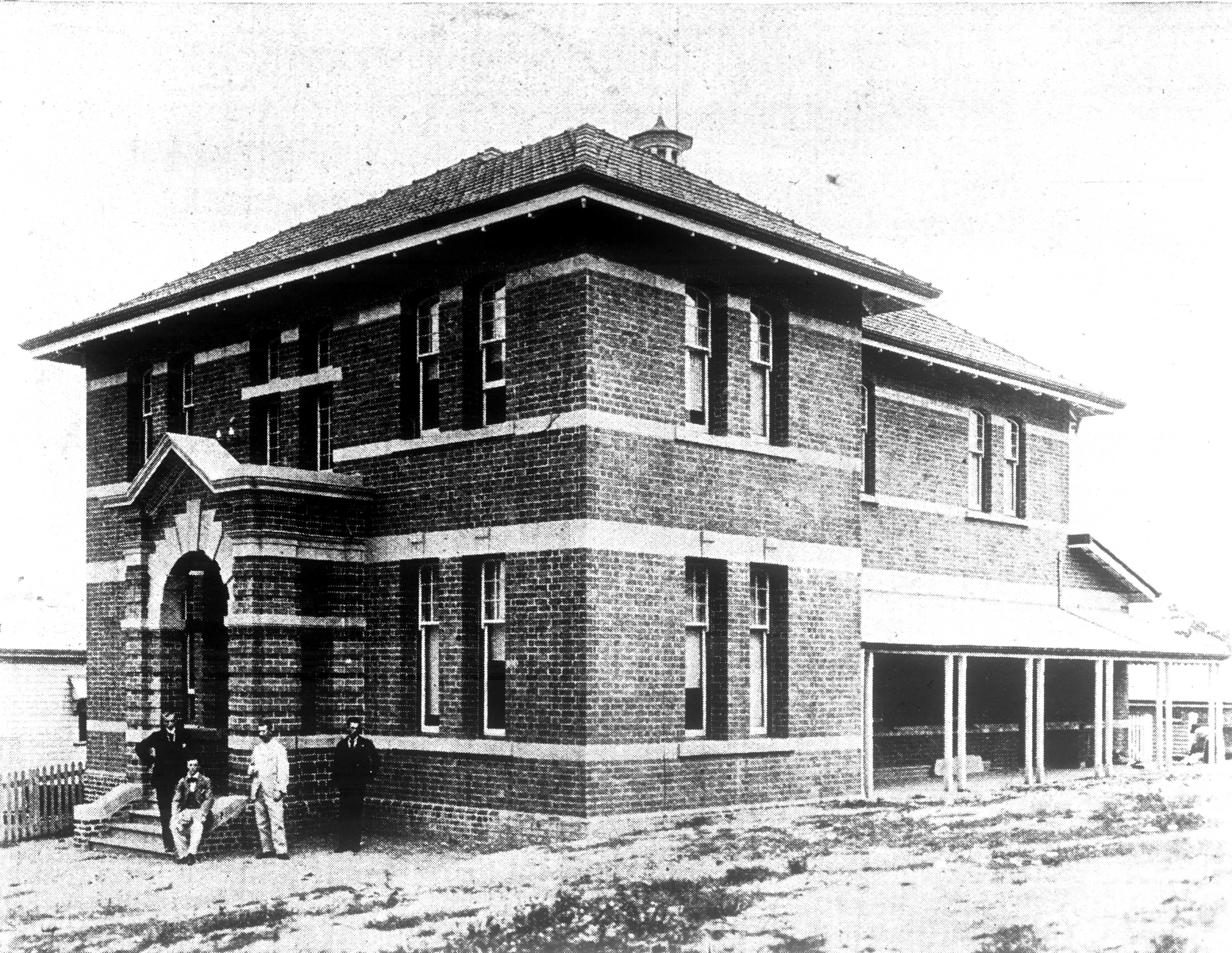
- Queensland Stock Institute, Normanby Hill 1900
- Founder: Stock Branch of the Queensland Colonial Secretary's Office
- Established: 1893
- Mission: "the discovery, by means of experimental research, of the nature and origin of diseases in Stock, and the means of their prevention"
- Key people: Charles Joseph Pound, James Sidney Hunt, Sydney Dodd, John James Dalton Harris
- Location: Brisbane, Queensland, Australia
- Coordinates: 27.46°S 153.0157°E
- Dissolved: 1910, on division into separate institutions for livestock and human disease. Livestock work moved to the Stock Experiment Station, Yeerongpilly.
- Renamed Bacteriological Institute in 1900

The Queensland Stock Institute was a government scientific facility in Brisbane, Queensland, Australia, for the research and prevention of disease in agricultural animals relevant to Queensland. Established in 1893, it was the first research institution in Queensland dedicated to the investigation of disease. In 1900, it was renamed the Bacteriological Institute when activities were officially extended to include human pathology. The institute ceased as a facility for livestock disease in 1910 when animal work was transferred to Yeerongpilly. Laboratory work relating to human disease remained at the purpose-built facility under the control of the health department until 1918.

== Origins ==
=== Pleuropneumonia ===
Contagious bovine pleuropneumonia (CBPP), a respiratory disease that affects cattle, led to the first livestock science in Queensland. Louis Willems’ tail inoculation work in Belgium was known in Australia prior to 1858, when the first diagnosed outbreak occurred in Victoria. Patrick Robertson Gordon, then Queensland's Chief Inspector of Stock and an advocate of inoculation, supported a proposal by graziers in 1887 for "establishing a laboratory for the cultivation of the contagium [sic] of pleuro-pneumonia for the inoculation of cattle".

=== Pasteur Mission ===
Expertise for a laboratory came the following year when Louis Pasteur, responding to a notice for the extermination of rabbits in New South Wales, sent a mission that included the French scientists Adrien Loir and Louis Germont. While in Australia, Loir and Germont were engaged by the Queensland Government to research the origin of pleuropneumonia and its preventive inoculation, setting up a temporary laboratory at the old Immigration Barracks (Brisbane central business district) in conjunction with the (sheep) quarantine grounds at Indooroopilly for experimental animals. The supervisory commission viewed the results as promising and recommended establishing a permanent institution and laboratory for all diseases of stock, with suitable buildings and a scientist.

Also in 1888, additional interest in "scientific inquiry" emerged when a deputation of graziers asked the Colonial Secretary to appoint a board to investigate mange in stock. In 1892 there was further petition for a local institute by the newly formed Queensland Stockbreeders and Graziers' Association, with reference to seeking the services of Adrien Loir.

== Establishment ==
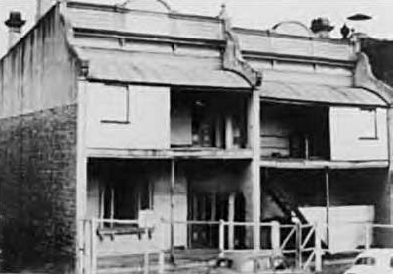
First premises, Turbot St (building photograph ca. 1953)

In November 1893 it was reported that the Colonial Secretary, Horace Tozer, had "decided to establish a Stock Institute in Brisbane for pathological and bacteriological purposes", and that Charles Joseph Pound, who had conducted a microscopy class in Brisbane, was preferred as scientist to take charge (Adrien Loir being unavailable). C. J. Pound FRMS had been principal assistant to Edgar Crookshank at Britain's first bacteriology laboratory, King's College London, and briefly studied vaccines at the Pasteur Institute in Paris. Establishment and maintenance costs were paid out of the Brands and Sheep Fund and a building in Turbot Street (Brisbane central business district) was leased for the institute.

=== Tick Fever ===
Pound was commissioned by the Government in 1894 to investigate redwater cattle disease in the Gulf Country of Northern Australia. He reported parasites transmitted by ticks as the cause (see tick fever: babesiosis, anaplasmosis), which was subsequently confirmed by James Sidney Hunt. A system of preventive inoculation was developed following Pound's experiments with blood from animals surviving tick fever, notably the Mundoolun experiments.

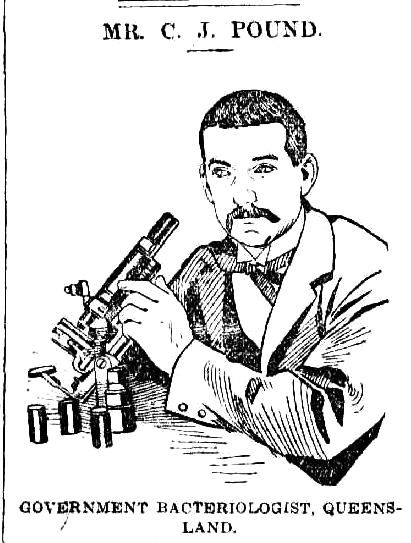
C. J. Pound ca. 1897

By 1895 the institute was outgrowing its Turbot Street premises; work had expanded beyond pleuropneumonia to tuberculosis, redwater, tetanus, and as time permitted, leprosy. The laboratory featured bacteria culturing apparatus, and histopathology preparation using paraffin. The institute's "museum" included specimens that showed advanced bovine tuberculosis (communicable to humans and a risk before milk pasteurisation), collected from apparently healthy cattle which supported Pound in urging for the establishment of public abattoirs and inspection of carcasses.

=== Tuberculin ===
The institute claimed to be the first in the Southern Hemisphere to produce standardised tuberculin on a large scale for testing tuberculosis in cattle. In 1898 Pound described the method developed at the institute for culturing the tubercle bacillus, and then purifying and standardising the extracted tuberculin. Refinements in bacteria growing conditions, filtering out contaminants, and the use of live animals to standardise each batch were seen as crucial in providing a reliable source for the tuberculin test.

== Bacteriological Institute ==
=== Normanby Hill ===
Floor Plans, Normanby Hill 1898

Plans were prepared in 1898 for new buildings to better accommodate the institute, including provision for livestock and small animals. The new site, about 6 acres (2.4 ha), was adjacent to the Brisbane Grammar School on College Road (known then as Normanby Hill, now part of Spring Hill). Pound was reported as having "regard to the plans of the Pasteur Institute" (Paris) in his influence on the design of the new premises.

In 1900 the name of the institution was altered to the Bacteriological Institute, with control moved from the agricultural department to the Home Secretary's department. Diagnostic work on human diseases by the institute was approved to the Board of Health. This included specimen examination for typhoid, diphtheria, and tuberculosis, diagnosis by bacteriology, and microscopy for tumours. Pound was appointed Government Bacteriologist and his staff consisted of three assistants.

=== Plague ===
Following the first reported cases of plague in Australia at Sydney in January 1900, Pound was asked to examine rats in Brisbane. In March 1900 Pound found plague bacilli in a dead rat near a wharf used by ships arriving from Sydney. The first human cases in Queensland were diagnosed later that year, and plague examinations became a major part of the institute's work until 1909.

The extent of work occupying the Bacteriological Institute is detailed in the Public Health Commissioner's annual reports. For 1905–1906, Pound stated that the institute had received a total of 17,062 specimens (animal and human combined). Specimens that returned positive for disease included: plague 49 (rat 38, human 11), tuberculosis 165 (cattle 2, human 163), typhoid 194, diphtheria 65, and leprosy 17. Unique specimens from medical operations were preserved for the institute's museum using the "formalin-glycerine process". Inoculum for pleuropneumonia was still being supplied to cattle owners in Queensland and other states, "guaranteed ... free from tuberculosis, actinomycosis, and other animal diseases". The institute also tested water and food. Of the 30 water samples examined for bacteria that year, Pound recorded that half were found to contain "coli bacilli" (an indicator of faecal contamination), 3 of which were also found to contain typhoid bacilli. An investigation of specimens from dengue fever patients was summarised with Pound noting that, of the microorganisms isolated, one microscopically distinct bacillus found common to 11 cases failed to prove as the "sole exciting cause" (now known to be viral).

=== Livestock refocus ===
A cattle tick conference in May 1907, convened by the agricultural department, approved the motion "that a bacteriologist be attached to the Department of Agriculture and Stock to investigate diseases in stock" with mention of regaining the services of Pound. It was reported the government decided that while Pound was to continue supervising the institute's work on plague outbreaks and other human pathology, his attention should again be directed to livestock: tick fever, pleuropneumonia, lumpy jaw, swine fever, swamp cancer, sheep parasites, and poultry diseases. As a result, in August 1907 supervision and control of the institute were returned to the agricultural department.

== Division ==
The agricultural sector sought additional research effort. In 1908 Sydney Dodd, then Principal Veterinary Surgeon and Bacteriologist in the agricultural department, asked the Government to obtain an experimental farm. Dodd's proposal included experiments for redwater disease (tick fever)—of increasing concern for Central Queensland, an "artificial virus" for pleuropneumonia inoculation, and plants toxic to livestock. This was realised in 1909 with the establishment of the Stock Experiment Station at Yeerongpilly (later to become the Animal Research Institute).

Discussions between the medical profession and the government occurred following the transfer of the institute back to the agricultural department, an indication of the growing recognition of the pathology sciences. When the Queensland branch of the British Medical Association requested a dedicated laboratory in 1910, the Government responded by dividing the human and livestock work into separate institutions. The institute was renamed the Laboratory of Microbiology and Pathology, with John J. D. Harris appointed as medical director and control transferred to the health department. Pound and the livestock work of the institute were reassigned to the Yeerongpilly facility.

== See also ==
- Animal Research Institute, Yeerongpilly
- Queensland Department of Agriculture, Fisheries and Forestry
- Queensland Institute of Medical Research
