= Animal Research Institute Buildings =

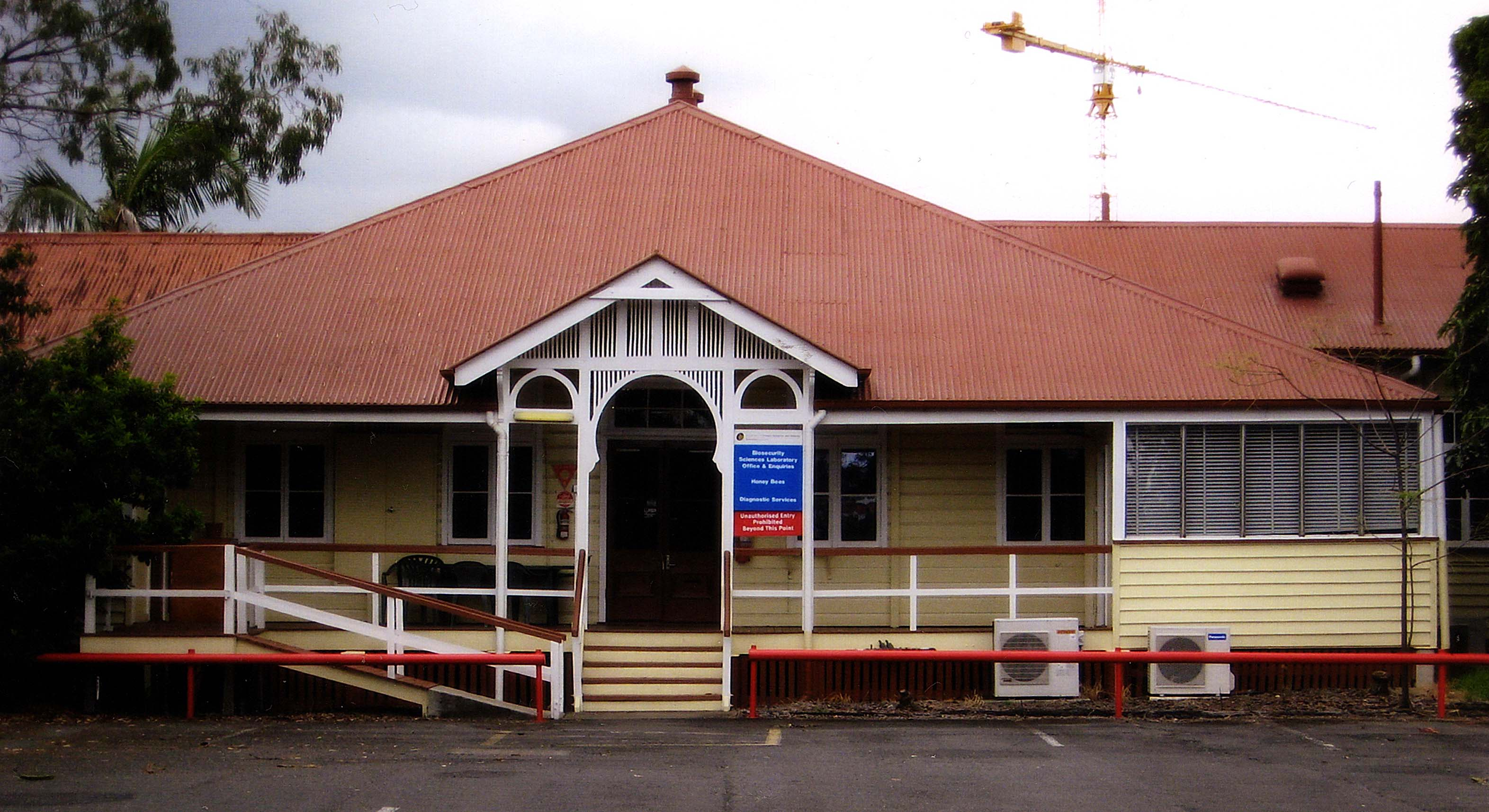
- Stock Experiment Station main building, 2008

- Location within Queensland
- 27.5246°S 153.0121°E
- Location: 681 Fairfield Road, Yeerongpilly, City of Brisbane, Queensland, Australia

Queensland Heritage Register
- Official name: Animal Research Institute (former), Stock Experiment Station (1909-1932), Animal Research Station (1932-1953)
- Type: state heritage (built)
- Designated: 13 June 2008
- Reference no.: 602598
- Significant period: 1909 - 2010

Animal Research Institute Buildings is a heritage-listed set of research station buildings at 681 Fairfield Road, Yeerongpilly, City of Brisbane, Queensland, Australia. It is also known as Stock Experiment Station (1909–1932) and Animal Research Station (1932–1953). It was added to the Queensland Heritage Register on 13 June 2008.

== History ==
The former Animal Research Institute at Yeerongpilly was established by the Department of Agriculture and Stock in 1909 as the Stock Experiment Station. The Station was the first purpose-built, farm-based facility of Australia's first Stock Institute and its work was primarily to research and control diseases in livestock, develop vaccines and improve animal health and production. The complex was extended over time to accommodate the changing needs of the institute, the University of Queensland's first veterinary training facility in 1938–1940 and then, between 1933 and 1967, the interrelated work of the Commonwealth Scientific and Industrial Research Organisation (CSIRO). In 1889 an Intercolonial Stock Conference in Melbourne recommended that an Australasian Stock Institute be established to study diseases in livestock; however the various colonies could not reach agreement on the matter. The first such institute was set up in Queensland in 1893 following a deputation of stock owners to the then Colonial Secretary, the Hon. Berkeley Basil Moreton. The Queensland Stock Institute was initially set up in rented premises in Turbot Street, Brisbane, under bacteriologist Charles Joseph Pound. The premises included a laboratory and a museum.

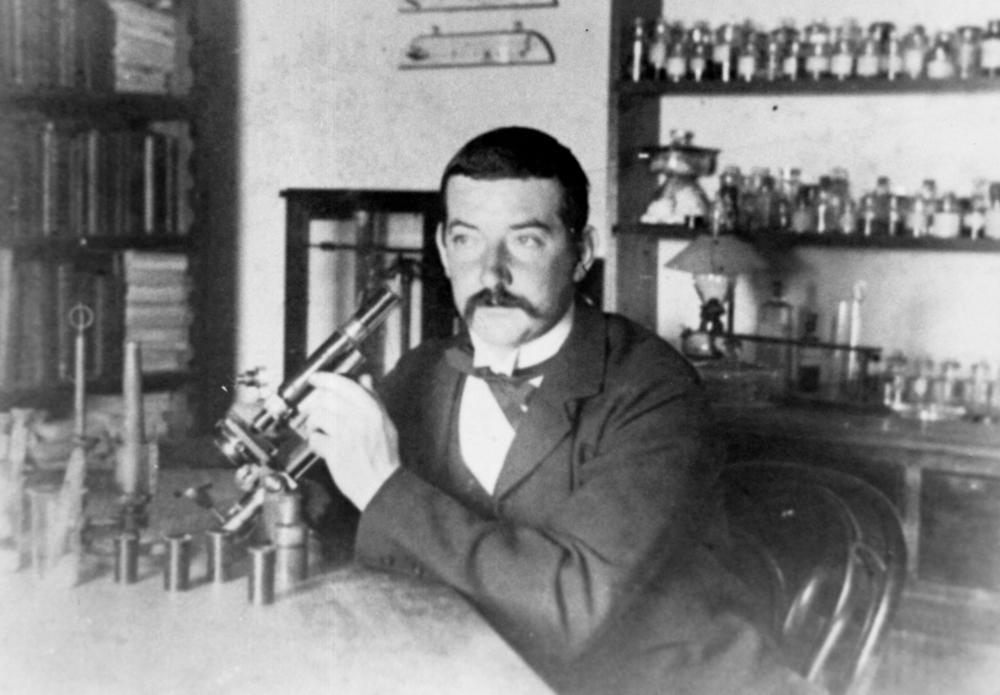
C. J. Pound at his microscope

Pound was a "microscopist" who trained in London in microscopy, physiology and bacteriology and at the Pasteur Institute in Paris in developing vaccines, then a new technology. Arriving in Sydney in 1892, he worked first for the New South Wales Department of Health before taking up the position in Queensland.

As part of his work for the new Stock Institute, in 1894 Pound proved that cattle ticks transmitted Redwater Disease (Bacillary Hemoglobinuria), which was causing heavy losses in Queensland cattle. He conducted the first inoculation studies into this disease in Australia and established a methodology and dosage that are still used worldwide. He trained stockowners in the techniques of collecting recovered blood, defibrillating it and using this vaccine to inoculate their stock. To facilitate this, he invented the "Pound" syringe and arranged for it to be manufactured. Backed by his lectures and published articles, this work made a major contribution to the success of Queensland's cattle industry. Pound's activities also included obtaining pathological specimens of various manifestations of diseases in stock and other domesticated animals, and items sent in by stock owners were added to the museum's collection. However, the primary object of the Institute in 1895 was to cultivate the pleuro-pneumonia virus for inoculating cattle. In 1897 administration of the Institute passed from the Colonial Secretary's Office to the Queensland Department of Agriculture, founded in 1887.

In 1899 new premises for the Institute were constructed in the then Brisbane suburb of Normanby (now within Spring Hill). The two-storey red brick building, located next to the Brisbane Grammar School residence on College Road, included rooms for Mr Pound and clerical work; a general laboratory; plus chemistry, incubator, sterilizing and photographic rooms on the ground floor, and a museum, library and lecture room on the first floor. Outbuildings included two stalls and loose-boxes, plus other facilities for stock used in experiments.

Due to the government's increased focus on human health, Pound was transferred to the Health Section of the Home Secretary's Department as Government Bacteriologist and the department was renamed the Bacteriological Institute. He was the only scientist in Australia then producing tuberculin, used in diagnosing human and bovine tuberculosis, and also carrying out work on leprosy.

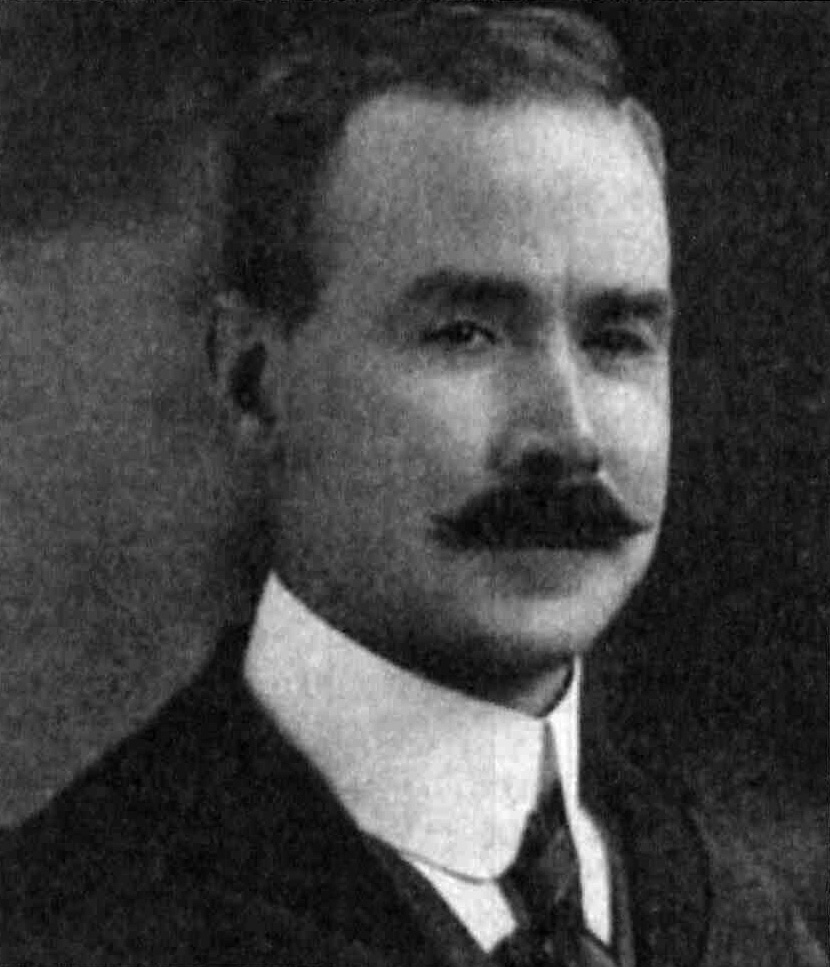
Sydney Dodd (1874-1926), veterinarian and scientist

In 1907, due to concerns about the impact of cattle tick on the dairy industry, the Institute returned to the control of the Department of Agriculture and Stock and Dr Sydney Dodd was appointed Principal Veterinary Surgeon and Bacteriologist for three years. He continued research work on the eradication of cattle ticks and the diseases caused by them. At his suggestion, the Department acquired 23 hectares (57 acres) of land at Yeerongpilly for an experimental station capable of accommodating the animals needed for research and sufficient for grass and crops to make the farm self-supporting in fodder. The Yeerongpilly site was more suitable than other sites considered as it was bounded on the north by the river, on the south by the railway line, leaving only narrow frontages on the east and west to adjoining land and public roads, thereby reducing the danger that disease could spread.

The first land sales in the Yeerongpilly area had begun in the 1850s and arrowroot and cotton were initially grown, being replaced by sugar cane before the industry moved north following a series of cold winters. In 1879, the Yeerongpilly Divisional Board was formed. The development of rail links in the 1880s opened the area to residential development; but this slowed in the late 19th century following the 1893 floods, which submerged much of Yeerongpilly; and the depression of the 1890s. In the early 20th century, development increased again and most of the area was connected to electricity by the 1920s.

The Stock Experiment Station complex, designed by Dodd, opened in 1909 making Queensland the first state to possess such a facility. As well as Dodd, it employed two laboratory assistants and two farm workers. The offices and laboratories were housed in a timber building, the Stock Experiment Station Main Building, probably designed by Arthur Morry, who was then the Department's architect. It had five rooms off a central corridor that led to a large, sixth room. There were verandahs on the eastern, northern and western sides. The rooms were all airy and well-lit, with fly-proof shields to windows and doors. The main laboratory in the room at the rear was fitted-out with shelves, cupboards and workbenches, much of which remains in 2011. There were also support structures and animal yards, along with a post mortem room, sheep and pig pens and an incinerator.

In 1909 a stable was erected to the north of the Stock Experiment Station Main Building. The Department of Agriculture and Stock Annual Report for 1910 described the building:

"The stable provide four stalls, a loose-box, and feed-room, with a room for harness, tools, etc., and another room for small animals, specially ventilated. The manger fittings are of iron, with water-pots and hay-racks combined. The floors of stalls are laid with a special channelled stable brick, and a tramway is laid the whole length of the building with an overhead traveller for removing the carcasses of dead animals."

A similar building of 12 stalls, designated as cattle byres, was erected immediately to the north but it does not survive. The total cost of the complex to October 1909 was £5,000.

In 1910 Dodd resigned and Pound was transferred from the Bacteriological Institute, taking charge of the new Station until his retirement in 1932, when the facility was renamed the Animal Health Station and a large wing was added to the northern side of the main building to provide additional laboratories. This wing comprised three rooms accessed by a verandah on the western side, part of which was later in-filled. Some original benches and bookcases have been removed. A verandah annex accommodating toilet, store, shower and dressing room on the 1909 section was extended in 1940 to include a ladies dressing room and the whole was modified in 1958 for further laboratory space and updated staffroom and toilets.

Facilities for undertaking post mortems were an essential part of the work of the Stock Experiment Station. The first detached post mortem building was erected in the 1920s and by the early 1930s a new one was required. This building, the Animal Morgue, was erected in 1934 to designs prepared by Department of Public Works architect DFW Roberts. It comprised a single room with a purpose-built concrete mortuary table in the centre and two concrete dissecting benches against the northern wall. As much as possible of the building was constructed of concrete for ease of cleaning and hygiene. It was well ventilated with ceiling vents and a Robinson's Patent ventilator on the roof. The joins between walls and floor were coved. The windows and doors were timber and fly-screens were provided to all openings. Taps operated by foot remain at the dissecting bench in the north-eastern corner.

In the 1930s, staff carried out the first animal husbandry research studies in Queensland with nutritional experiments on pigs and poultry. Major alterations were undertaken in 1939 to convert the Animal Health Station for use as an anatomy school by the University of Queensland's Veterinary School. In April 1935 Queensland Premier William Forgan Smith had stated the reasoning behind the government's funding of a veterinary school for Queensland - that:

"Queensland ... was a primary producer, and its problems could in large measure be solved by research; veterinary science would supplement the contribution of agriculture ... a scientific veterinary staff would enable the Department of Agriculture and Stock to deal efficiently with all aspects of veterinary problems and only a Queensland school could meet Queensland's needs ..."

The Courier Mail concurred:

"animal husbandry, sheep, beef and dairy cattle supported the whole edifice of the state's economy. The need was clear ..."

Subsequently, in 1936, a faculty of Veterinary Science had been established within the University of Queensland to provide local training for veterinarians. For practical and economic reasons the faculty used the existing facilities at the Animal Health Station at Yeerongpilly and the North Queensland Stock Experiment Station at Oonoonba in Townsville (est. 1915), as it was thought that their work would complement that of the Veterinary Science Department.

A dedicated building for the School was planned for the Yeerongpilly site and its first stage - comprising part of the animal hospital and the northern wing of the main building - was completed in 1938. Facilities for anatomy were still required so the 1909 stable was altered for this purpose by infilling the door openings on the north with weatherboards and casement windows, lining interior walls with VJ pine boards, inserting a ceiling and covering the brick floor with a concrete slab. (It is not clear if all brick floors were simply covered or some removed. Some channeled brick flooring remains in the room on the south-eastern corner of the stable in 2011.) In c. 1940 a skillion-roofed, weatherboard-clad annex was erected along the stable's eastern side.

The final two stages in the building of the Veterinary School were completed by 1940 commencing with the remainder of the Hospital Block and the southern wing, and ending with the eastern (entry) wing. It contained five laboratories, offices, library, dark room, stores, toilets, locker and common rooms; the northern wing offices, lecture rooms, X-ray room and operating theatres; and the southern wing a museum, preparation room, post-mortem room and common room. The Hospital Block was L-shaped forming a courtyard at the rear of Main Building. It provided accommodation for cattle, horses, dogs, cats, and small animals receiving treatment. A two-storey fodder store was located on the south-western corner of the Hospital Block and a blacksmith shop on the eastern end of its southern wing. The construction of the Veterinary School was completed for £26,000.

The Veterinary School suspended its activities during World War II. The United States Army's 3rd Medical Laboratory arrived in Brisbane in June 1942, and its Headquarters Section moved into the new Veterinary School buildings soon after. The functions of a Medical Laboratory (on behalf of US Army medical units) included: water analyses; examination of food supplies; investigation of epidemics and epizootics; and the distribution of special laboratory supplies. The laboratories performed special serological, bacteriological, pathological and chemical examinations, and would have played an important role in safeguarding the health of US troops operating in a tropical environment.

Medical Laboratories could also furnish support for post mortem examinations. The USA Quartermaster had a morgue in Yeerongpilly by October 1943, and this was probably the morgue at the School. US military personnel who died in Australia were buried locally, including at Ipswich, and their bodies were returned to the US after the war.

The 3rd Medical Laboratory was the only laboratory in the South West Pacific Area until mid 1943, and it also functioned as a Malaria School. Apparently it did not treat any patients. A Veterinary Officer also served at the Headquarters section, to supervise the animal section of the laboratory. In August 1943 the 3rd Medical Laboratory was replaced at Yeerongpilly by the 8th Medical Laboratory, which left Australia in late August 1944. The circular garden arrangement with flagpole located in front of the Veterinary School is a typical US Army design, and probably dates from the period of US occupation. The Veterinary School was handed back to the government in excellent order, with some improvements, in September 1944. After the departure of the US Army, staff from the Stock Experiment Station Main Building moved into the Veterinary School Main Building. In 1946–7 the university moved into relocated timber buildings on site. The University of Queensland's Veterinary School remained there in temporary accommodation until February 1961 when the school moved to the university's St Lucia campus.

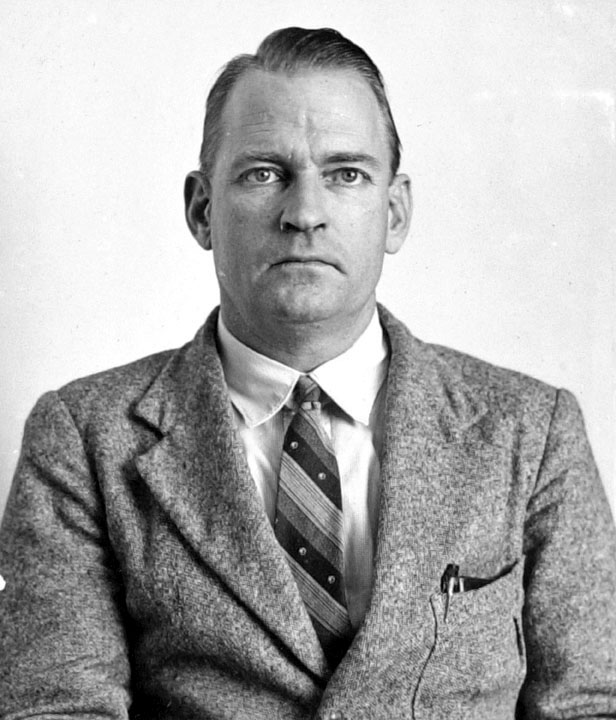
Dr FHS Roberts, Parasitologist, 1937

By the early 1930s, the Council of Scientific and Industrial Research (CSIR, later CSIRO, established in 1926 by the Australian Government) were conducting research on stock in Queensland, collaborating with and complementing the work of the Department of Agriculture and Stock. This interaction saw responsibilities for certain aspects of pest control and research shift between the organizations. Over time a number of scientists involved in animal research worked for both organizations. Among these scientists, one who had a longstanding and important association with Yeerongpilly was Dr Frederick Hugh Sherston Roberts (1901–1972). Born in Rockhampton, Roberts studied at the University of Queensland and was based at Yeerongpilly from 1933 as an entomologist and parasitologist. Roberts specialized in researching parasitic diseases of livestock and was sent abroad for this purpose, and additionally researched domestic animal parasites.

From 1945, CSIR were using the Stock Experiment Station Main Building. In 1947 Roberts was appointed as principal research officer and officer-in charge of the new CSIR Veterinary Parasitology Laboratory at Yeerongpilly. The CSIR announced in early 1948 that in tandem with beef production expansion, Queensland would become the Australian centre for research into the industry. In June of that year the Department of Agriculture and Stock announced that the CSIR would be granted for ten years, "free of interest" the buildings at the State Animal Health laboratory.

In 1949, CSIR was renamed CSIRO, the Commonwealth Scientific and Industrial Research Organisation. A timber wing was added on the southern side of the Stock Experiment Station Main Building in 1950 to provide additional facilities for CSIRO's Veterinary Parasitology Laboratory. Under the leadership of Roberts, this laboratory became known internationally for its work on parasitic diseases of cattle. A number of other subsidiary buildings were also erected on the site during this period to accommodate the work of CSIRO.

In 1954, the Animal Health Station was renamed the Animal Research Institute and from 1967 Queensland Government laboratory staff were again housed in the Stock Experiment Station Main Building, following CSIRO's departure for new laboratories at Long Pocket, Indooroopilly.

In 1952 about 21 acres (8.5 ha) of the site was transferred to the Brisbane City Council and then on to the State Electricity Authority for the development of the Tennyson Power Station, which has since been demolished to make way for riverside apartment blocks and a tennis centre.

There are several buildings on site that are not considered to be of cultural heritage significance. In 1956 three buildings were erected at the rear of western wing of the Veterinary School Hospital Block - two brick buildings accommodating animal stalls and a metal-clad and framed building for stores. The c.1938 garage adjacent to the northern end of the hospital was also extended as part of these additions. In 1960 a brick staff amenities building was erected adjacent to the stores building and abutting the western wall of the Hospital Block. These buildings demonstrate the expansion of the Animal Research Institute in the 1950s and early 1960s but are not considered to be of cultural heritage significance. Several timber buildings erected in the early 1950s to provide additional offices and laboratory accommodation are located immediately to the rear of the Stock Experiment Station Main Building. These buildings are not considered to be of cultural heritage significance.

Work carried out by the Institute over the years includes testing to diagnose diseases of cattle, sheep, goats, horses, deer, pigs and poultry. It is famous for its research into cattle tick fever and developing vaccines against stock diseases. Research work has been carried out on plant poisons, infectious and parasitic diseases, trace element deficiencies and metabolic disorders. Many diseases of livestock were first diagnosed and described at Yeerongpilly, leading to effective control measures being developed. The research undertaken by the institute has been a major factor in the development of pastoral primary industries in Queensland.

Following road works in 1983 the main entrance to the institute was relocated from Fairfield Road to Ortive Street.

In 1999 the Department of Primary Industries opened the CJ Pound Laboratory at the Tick Fever Research Centre at Wacol, in honour of a man who was described by one newspaper as the "boffin" who "saved the cattle industry".

In 2011 the institute has vacated the site which is to be redeveloped.

== Description ==
Site plan, circa 1983

The former Animal Research Institute is a complex of buildings, sheds and animal pens on a 12 hectares (30 acres) site in the Brisbane suburb of Yeerongpilly. Those structures considered of state-level heritage significance are: the Stock Experiment Station Main Building (1909), an associated Stable (1909), the purpose-built Animal Morgue (1934), and the Veterinary School Main Building and Hospital Block (1938–1940). The entire Institute site is bound on the north by King Arthur Terrace, to the east by Fairfield Road, on the south by the Tennyson Branch Railway line, and to the west by an easement shared with the Queensland Tennis Centre. Its entrance is on King Arthur Terrace on the north-eastern corner and the significant buildings are clustered on higher ground across the eastern half of the site with the remaining, lower area comprising many large, fenced yards of grass.

=== Stock Experiment Station Main Building ===
The Stock Experiment Station Main Building is a large timber-framed building comprising a central rectangular core with wings to the north (1932) and south (1950). All the building's phases feature verandahs, some of which are enclosed. The building is low-set and single-storey except for the southern wing which, in using the slope of the land, is two-storey. The roof is hipped and sheeted with corrugated metal and has three metal ventilators on the centre ridge which are not original. This building occupies the centre of the site facing east onto a large asphalted forecourt used for car parking. The view this forecourt provides of what has historically been the front facade of the earliest building on the Institute site is considered of cultural heritage significance, while the asphalt itself is not.

The different phases of construction of this building are distinguishable in its fabric. The original 1909 core is in a Federation style, the northern wing (1932) has elements typical of the interwar classical style, and the southern wing (1950) is in a post-war functionalist style. The exterior of the building is clad with chamferboards on the core and southern wing and weatherboards on the northern wing. The core is surrounded by verandahs which are mostly enclosed. The southern and northern wings are long and narrow and have verandahs on their western sides providing access to the rooms that open from them.

The composition of the eastern facade reflects the symmetrical plan of the core. The open verandah has a small, projecting central gabled entrance with decorative timber battens and arches sheltering a short timber stair. A later timber ramp provides access to its southern end, which is not considered to be of cultural heritage significance. Each verandah end is enclosed with glazing, weatherboards, and fibrous cement sheeting. The verandah balustrade is a timber post and rail arrangement that is not original and therefore not of cultural heritage significance. The verandah ceiling is tongue-and-groove jointed boarding on the rake and the floor is recent shot-edge boards.

The building's 1909 core comprises six rooms and a central hall leading off the east-facing front verandah to one of the rooms, a large laboratory, to the west. The hall has a decorative timber battened arch with moulded brackets and architrave. All rooms (except the laboratory) have pressed metal ceilings, pressed metal cornices, and decorative, ventilated ceiling roses some of which have evidence of gas pendant lights which are not extant. The ceiling of the former laboratory is lined with flat sheeting with no cornice. The other rooms, formerly laboratories and store rooms, have plastered walls with rounded corners which are stop-chamfered near the ceiling. The hall walls are timber, vertically jointed boards. There are no skirtings or rails throughout and all walls and ceilings are painted. The floors are lined with non-original carpet or vinyl, coverings which are not of cultural heritage significance.

The rooms feature a number of built-in timber cabinets, shelves, work benches, and freestanding furniture that are early or original. Original internal doors are timber with stop-chamfered detailing and have early or original brass (as well as more recent) door furniture. A number of recent doors have been installed throughout the 1909 core and are not of cultural heritage significance. Timber French doors with glazing and decorative bolection moulding and timber casement windows open onto the eastern verandah. Some of these doors and windows retain original glazed fanlights with curved brass opening stays and mechanisms with ceramic knobs. Projecting from the north- western corner of the rear, western verandah are a number of smaller rooms containing toilets and a shower, a staff room, and a small laboratory. The walls and ceilings of these rooms are lined with fibrous cement sheeting and rounded cover strips, and the floors are finished with vinyl, ceramic tiles, and terrazzo. The 1909 laboratory contains equipment, cupboards, and workbenches.

The core of the Station Main Building is supported on low concrete stumps, and timber and steel posts. There is a small, timber enclosure under the core on its southern side that contains a small laboratory with shelving, workbenches, and cupboards.

The Station Main Building's northern wing comprises three rooms and a semi-enclosed, west-facing verandah. It is supported on low concrete stumps, and timber and steel posts. Tongue-and-groove jointed boarding lines the ceilings of each room and the floors are covered in vinyl or carpet. The walls of the central room are sheeted while the walls of the other two rooms have vertically jointed boards with moulded belt rails. The rooms contain some solid timber furniture, wall-hung cupboards, and workbenches that appear original to the 1932 construction date. One original timber-boarded door remains in the southernmost room. The original windows are timber-framed and double- hung or casements with fanlights. Air conditioning units have replaced some windows however those remaining retain original brass hardware.

The southern wing comprises two levels, four rooms on the upper floor and three rooms and a toilets area on the lower, connected by a stair to west-facing verandahs. This building wing is founded on a concrete slab partially suspended and supported on brick-faced foundations. The rooms have plasterboard ceilings with a large coved cornice, plasterboard walls, a square timber skirting, and vinyl covered floors. The rooms contain solid timber built-in workbenches and wall- hung cupboards that are original to the 1950 construction date. The rooms also feature a number of solid timber, freestanding pieces of furniture. The doors are timber with a glazed panel and some have screens. The original windows are timber-framed with two layers, an inner set of double hung sashes and an outer layer of casements. Those on the eastern side have timber brackets with slots for a workbench shield. The toilet ceilings and walls are sheeted, and the floor is a vinyl composite coved to the wall. The fixtures are original.

Adjacent to the western side of the Stock Experiment Station's northern wing is a small building, rectangular in plan with a Dutch gable roof clad with corrugated metal sheeting, weatherboard clad walls, and a concrete slab floor. The top section of the exterior walls is in-filled with mesh to the soffit allowing ventilation of the interior. A channel in the slab drains into a drainage trough running around the base of the south-western corner. A concrete ramp leads to a door on the side of the building and a large concrete open-topped tank is positioned next to the north-eastern side. The doors are timber, one having a screen. Some windows have been sheeted up to hold air conditioning units, while others are later aluminium-framed sliders.

=== Stable ===
The Stable (1909) is located nearby to the north of the Stock Experiment Station Main Building. It is a long rectangle in plan with a hipped and gabled roof. A small secondary gable extends about three- quarters the length of the main ridge to assist ventilation. All roof planes are sheeted with corrugated metal. The stable is timber-framed, and clad in weatherboards. The floor is a concrete slab with areas of early brick flooring visible in the rooms on its eastern side. The gable end walls have ventilated weatherboards at the apex. The interior is divided into a number of rooms by a combination of vertically jointed boarding and sheet walls. The doors are all modern and not significant. The early windows are double-hung timber sashes. Some have had air conditioning units installed in the bottom sash. Channels in the floor connect to an external concrete spoon drain that runs around the base of the building. In the largest room, facing west, meshed ventilation windows are positioned near the floor. A freestanding building which is not significant is located on the eastern side of the stable separated by a very narrow space with a concrete spoon drain.

=== Animal Morgue ===
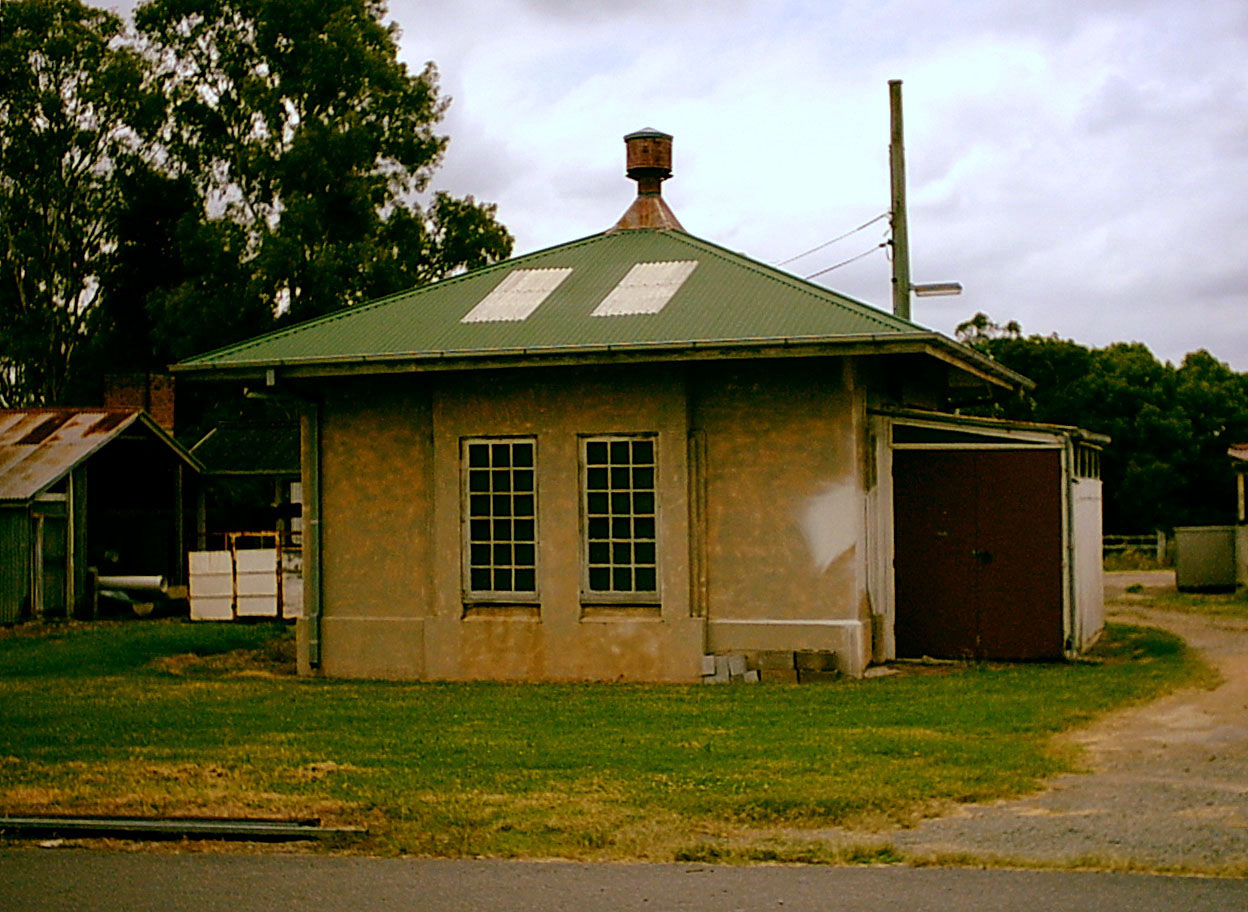
Animal morgue, 2004

The Animal Morgue (1934) is situated north of the Stable. The morgue is a cement-rendered concrete structure, square in plan, with a timber-framed pyramid roof clad with corrugated metal sheeting. A large metal ventilation fleche caps the ridge. A timber lean-to that is not significant shelters the entry doors. There are prominent stepped architraves around the exteriors of the windows. The interior walls are cement-rendered with coving to all corners. The floor is concrete, while the ceiling is white-painted cement sheet with dark- stained timber battens forming a geometric pattern. The ceiling features lattice timber ventilation panels and a skylight at the southern end made with translucent corrugated plastic sheeting. The double door is timber with multi-light glazed panels. The windows are multi-light, timber double-hung sashes and have external hinged timber-framed screens. There are small high level windows in the west wall. All glass in the building is obscured. A steel I-beam spans the width of the room from north to south. In the north-western corner is a concrete dissecting bench with drain and in the north-eastern corner is a similar bench with a ceramic sink and associated foot-operated tap. These tables drain to an integrated concrete surface gutter that runs around the western and northern edges of the floor. There is a central floor drain.

=== Veterinary School Main Building ===
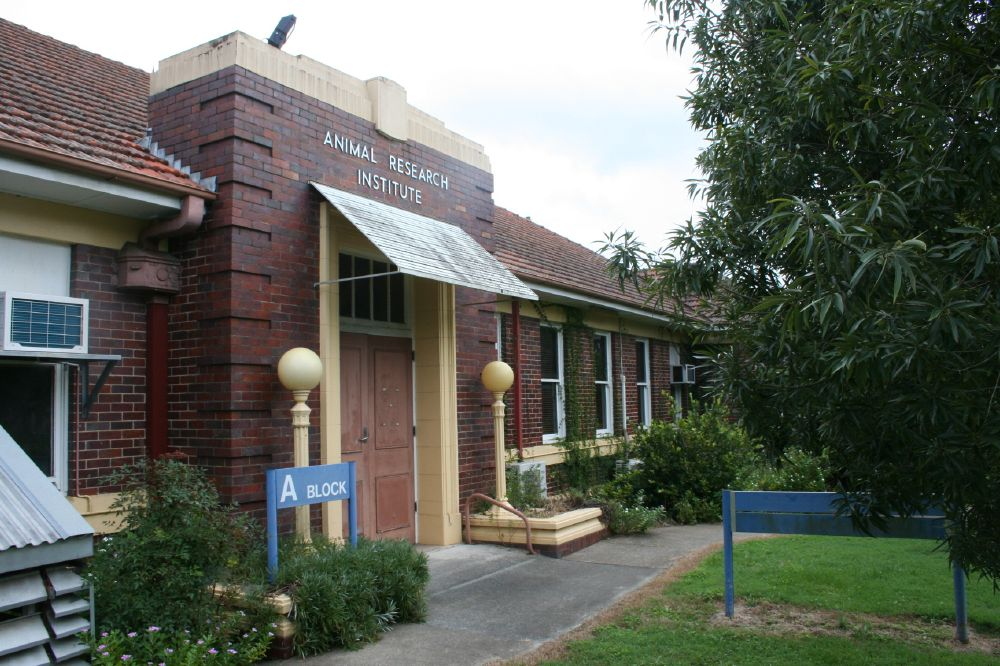
Vet School main building, 2011

The Veterinary School Main Building is located to the south-east of the Stock Experiment Station Main Building, facing east towards Fairfield Road. It is a large, single storey, U-shaped building of brick construction with a hipped roof clad with tiles. The building is notable for its Interwar Classical design and detailing, including its symmetrical plan form, high ceilings, interior colour scheme of white paint and dark-stained timber, and the rhythmic placement of its windows. The exterior of the building is glazed brick with cream- painted, cement-rendered dressings. The symmetrical front facade has a central pedimented entry and flanking wings with rhythmically placed windows terminating in projecting bays. The entry is prominent, having brick planters and metal pedestal lights with large globe-shaped shades. A metal awning shelters the door and is not significant.

The entry foyer has a terrazzo floor, rendered walls scored to imitate stonework, moulded timber picture rail, decorative plaster cornice, and stained and clear lacquered timber doors with leaded glazing panels, sidelights, and fanlights. A timber-framed reception window opens into the adjacent room. The room features timber, wall-hung display cabinet and pigeon holes, and a large amount of veterinary science paraphernalia.

The building plan is arranged around a central corridor that runs down all wings providing access to variously sized rooms on either side. The entry (eastern) wing contains laboratories, offices, toilets, and store rooms. The southern wing contains similar spaces and also a dark room and the post-mortem room. This is a large room, its floor set lower than the other rooms with coved concrete skirtings. It has a large doorway to the exterior in-filled with more recent glazing and a timber door, and a steel I-beam on the ceiling above the door. The northern wing again contains laboratories, offices and store rooms, but also a large lecture room with dais and kitchenette, and an equine operating theatre. Another large room, it has concrete floors, coved concrete skirtings, walls tiled to shoulder height, a steel I-beam and hoist trolley fixed to the ceiling above the large doorway to the exterior.

The Veterinary School building interior has sheeting and batten cover strips lining its ceilings in a geometric pattern. The ceiling ventilation panels have all been sheeted over. Walls are rendered, and floors are finished with carpet, vinyl, or sealed concrete coved to the walls. There are dark-stained and clear-finished timber skirtings, cornices, picture rails, and architraves in most rooms. Room names are painted on timber panels and fixed above doorways. The timber doors match the other timberwork in the building with circular, glass observation panels, or panels with bolection moulding. Most retain original brass hardware and some the original auto-closers. Windows are timber-framed double-hung sashes or timber-framed fixed panes; many of which have external, hinged, timber-framed screens and retain original brass hardware.

The building retains many original items of built-in and freestanding furniture including terrazzo-topped, cantilevered concrete work benches, solid timber cabinets, drawers, cupboards, ceramic pedestal basins, wall-hung timber display cases, and picture frames. The toilets retain original partitions and doors as well as many fixtures and fittings. Cupboards and store rooms retain original timber shelving.

The main facade of the building looks to the east and a grassed area where a large, circular garden bed formed by concrete edging is positioned. Its shape and extent are significant but not the edging. In its centre is a steel flagpole dating from the period of the School's occupation during WWII. The building wings facing to the west enclose a small courtyard which has large sections of concrete pathway and some plantings, none of which are significant.

=== Veterinary School Hospital Block ===
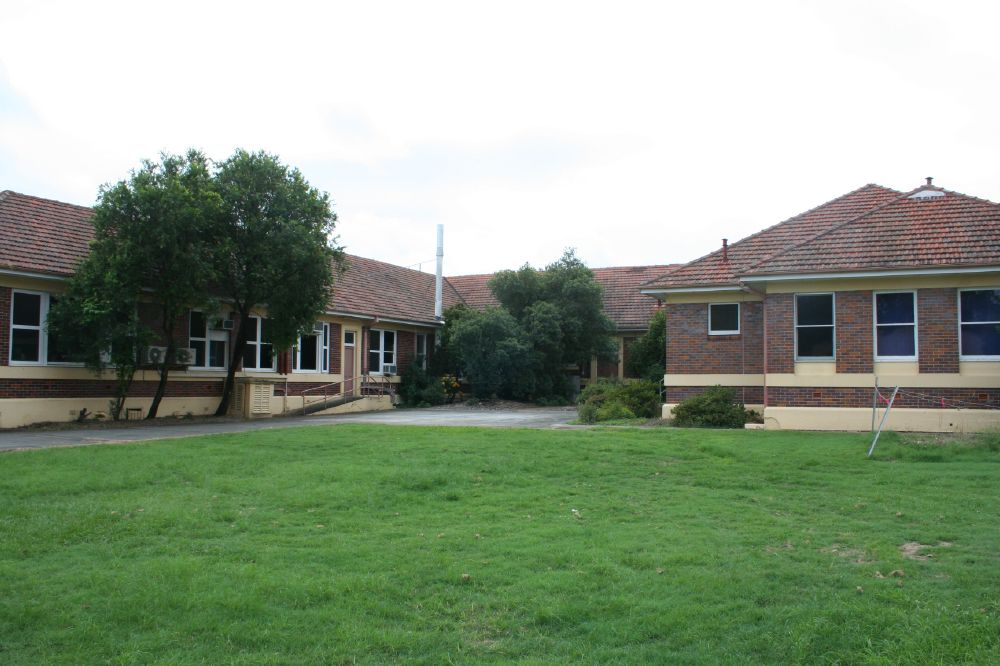
Vet School Hospital Block, 2011

The Veterinary School Hospital Block is located to the west of the Veterinary School Main Building and its L-shaped plan completes a large grassed courtyard between the two. The hospital block is long and narrow with small stalls for animals along the western range, a two-level, brick fodder store in the south-western corner, a series of work rooms by the yard entrance on the north-west, further work rooms in the southern range terminating to the east with a blacksmith's room with forge and chimney. It combines glazed brickwork (the same as in the Veterinary School Main Building adjacent) and timber construction with a hipped roof over the fodder store and skillion roofs elsewhere; all clad with corrugated metal sheets. The interior walls of the animal stalls are painted brick with concrete floors. Enclosure on the yard side is by timber half-doors, steel mesh, and fly screens. Small, high-level windows feature on the rear wall. A timber and mesh enclosure runs along the front of the animal stalls and a concrete apron with drain extends into the courtyard. The workrooms and blacksmith's room have timber double-hung sash windows and ceilings of jointed boarding. The forge is sheeted over internally. The upper level of the fodder store is accessed by a timber stair and door on its western facade, where a large timber beam and part of a pulley is fixed to the ceiling above the doorway. There is evidence of a trap door into the lower level. The three-bay garage on the northern end of the hospital block's western range of rooms opens to the north. Adjacent to this is a small reception office, gate, and store rooms that attach to the north-western end of the Veterinary School Main Building.

Additions have been made to the western side of the Hospital Block and are not of heritage significance. Nor are the garages that were part of its original construction (1938–40).

== Heritage listing ==
The Animal Research Institute Buildings were listed on the Queensland Heritage Register on 13 June 2008 having satisfied the following criteria.

The place is important in demonstrating the evolution or pattern of Queensland's history.

The Animal Research Institute at Yeerongpilly was the oldest facility of its kind in Queensland, its work having begun with the establishment of the Stock Experiment Station in 1909 - the state's first purpose-built, farm-based animal research laboratory - and continued until its closure in 2010. The place demonstrates the enduring importance of the pastoral primary industries to Queensland's economy and the commitment of successive governments to supporting this industry through scientific research into its productivity, most particularly the diseases that threatened its profitability.

The Veterinary School Main Building and Hospital Block (1938–1940) were the first purpose-built facility for tertiary-level veterinary science training in Queensland. The buildings demonstrate the formalisation of professional training in the medical and veterinary sciences, and its physical association within professional facilities, an approach being strongly advocated by the state government at the time.

Over the course of its long history the Animal Research Institute (former) has accommodated the work of the state government's Animal Research Institute, the University of Queensland Veterinary School and the Commonwealth Scientific and Industrial Research Organisation (CSIRO). The place is associated with important scientific advances in diagnostic research into the prevention and treatment of diseases in livestock, and the development and supply of vaccines, to which all of these organisations have contributed.

The circular garden bed and flagpole at the front of the Veterinary School Main Building provide the only evidence of the occupation of it, and other parts of the site now demolished, by the United States Army during World War II. The 3rd Medical Laboratory, based there from 1942 until 1943 when the 8th Medical Laboratory took its place, played an important role in safeguarding the health of US troops operating in a tropical environment and was the only laboratory in the South West Pacific Area until mid 1943.

The place is important in demonstrating the principal characteristics of a particular class of cultural places.

The Stock Experiment Station Main Building (1909), Stable (1909) and Animal Morgue (1934) are important as a demonstration of the principal characteristics of an animal research facility, comprising research laboratories, offices, animal accommodation and handling, and facility for conducting post mortems.

The Veterinary School Main Building and Hospital Block (1938–1940) are important as a demonstration of the principal characteristics of Queensland's first veterinary school, including formally composed facades, offices, a lecture room, library, laboratories, animal operating and post-mortem rooms, animal stalls, fodder store and blacksmith.

The Stock Experiment Station Main Building, Animal Morgue, Veterinary School Main Building, and Hospital Block are substantially intact and retain original interior and exterior detailing to facilitate superior functionality, as well as built-in and loose furniture, fixtures, and fittings used specifically for performing animal research, all of which provide a clear demonstration of the original function of the place.

The place has a special association with the life or work of a particular person, group or organisation of importance in Queensland's history.

The core of the Stock Experiment Station Main Building and the Stable, the earliest parts of the former Animal Research Institute, have a special association with Charles Joseph Pound (b. 1866, d. 1946), the inaugural director of the Queensland Stock Institute, the first such laboratory in Australia, and head of the facility at Yeerongpilly from 1910 to 1932 when he retired. Pound is credited with the research and development that provided a means of preventing the spread of Redwater Disease, which caused heavy losses to Queensland's vital cattle industry during the late nineteenth century. Under the auspices of the Institute Pound conducted the first inoculation studies into this disease in Australia and established a methodology and dosage that are still used worldwide.

The former Animal Research Institute also has a special association with the internationally renowned parasitologist and entomologist Dr Frederick Hugh Sherston Roberts (b. 1901, d. 1972) who began work at the Yeerongpilly research facility in 1933 when it was known as the Animal Health Station. Following World War II, he returned to work at Yeerongpilly and under his direction as principal research officer and officer-in-charge of CSIRO's veterinary parasitology laboratory (1947–1966) the Yeerongpilly institute gained an international reputation for its studies of parasitic diseases in cattle.
