= Animal Research Institute, Yeerongpilly =

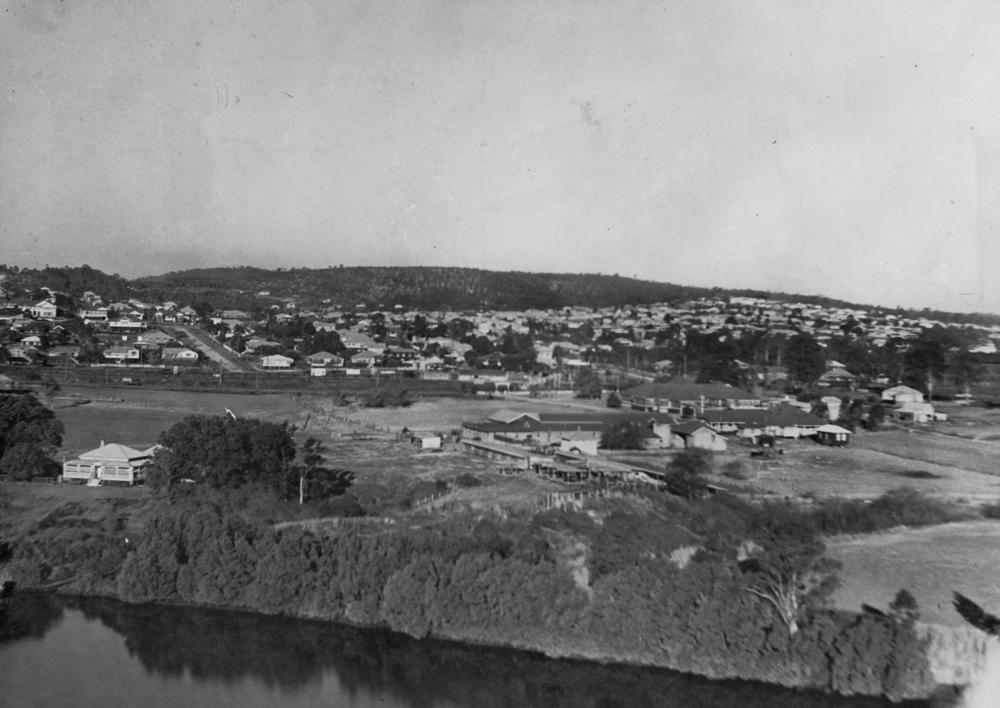
- Animal research complex at Yeerongpilly, 1946

- Site location
- 27°31′29″S 153°00′41″E
- Location: Yeerongpilly, Queensland, Australia

History
- Founded: Stock Experiment Station 1909

The Animal Research Institute, Yeerongpilly (ARI) was a government science complex at Yeerongpilly, Queensland, Australia, serving the agricultural sector of Queensland. A number of the Animal Research Institute Buildings are heritage-listed, added to the Queensland Heritage Register in 2008.

== History ==
The site was proposed and established by Sydney Dodd in 1909 as the Stock Experiment Station for the then Queensland Department of Agriculture and Stock. The land had been occupied in the 19th century by the King family, Parr Smith – headmaster of the Yeronga State School, and A. A. McDiarmid. With Dodd began the site's long-standing contribution to the cattle industry in the protection against tick fever (babesiosis, anaplasmosis). In 1910 the Government Bacteriologist Charles Joseph Pound, inaugural director of the Queensland Stock Institute, took charge of the station for the next 22 years.

From 1932 to 1953 the complex was known as the Animal Health Station. In this period the site's various scientific disciplines became specialised roles, and the Department's biochemical and toxicological laboratory sections were also transferred there. The CSIRO, known then as the Council for Scientific and Industrial Research (CSIR), and the University of Queensland's Veterinary School first occupied parts of the site during this era. In World War II the United States Army utilised the Veterinary School building, with a laboratory and malaria school formed as part of the 3rd Medical Laboratory in 1942.

Animal Research Institute, Yeerongpilly c. 1983

In 1953, the complex became the Animal Research Institute. Immunologist and Nobel Laureate Peter C. Doherty worked at Yeerongpilly in the 1960s, involved in diagnostic veterinary pathology and a project on the epidemiology of bovine leptospirosis. A national campaign to eradicate bovine brucellosis and tuberculosis (BTEC) was supported by a set of laboratories built on the site in the 1970s. The investigation of Hendra virus, first described after an outbreak at a Brisbane suburb in 1994, included researchers at Yeerongpilly.

In 2009, the site celebrated a centenary of contribution to veterinary pathology, microbiology, biometry, biochemistry, animal husbandry, information and extension. The Institute had vacated the site in 2011, relocating activities to other facilities.

== Redevelopment ==
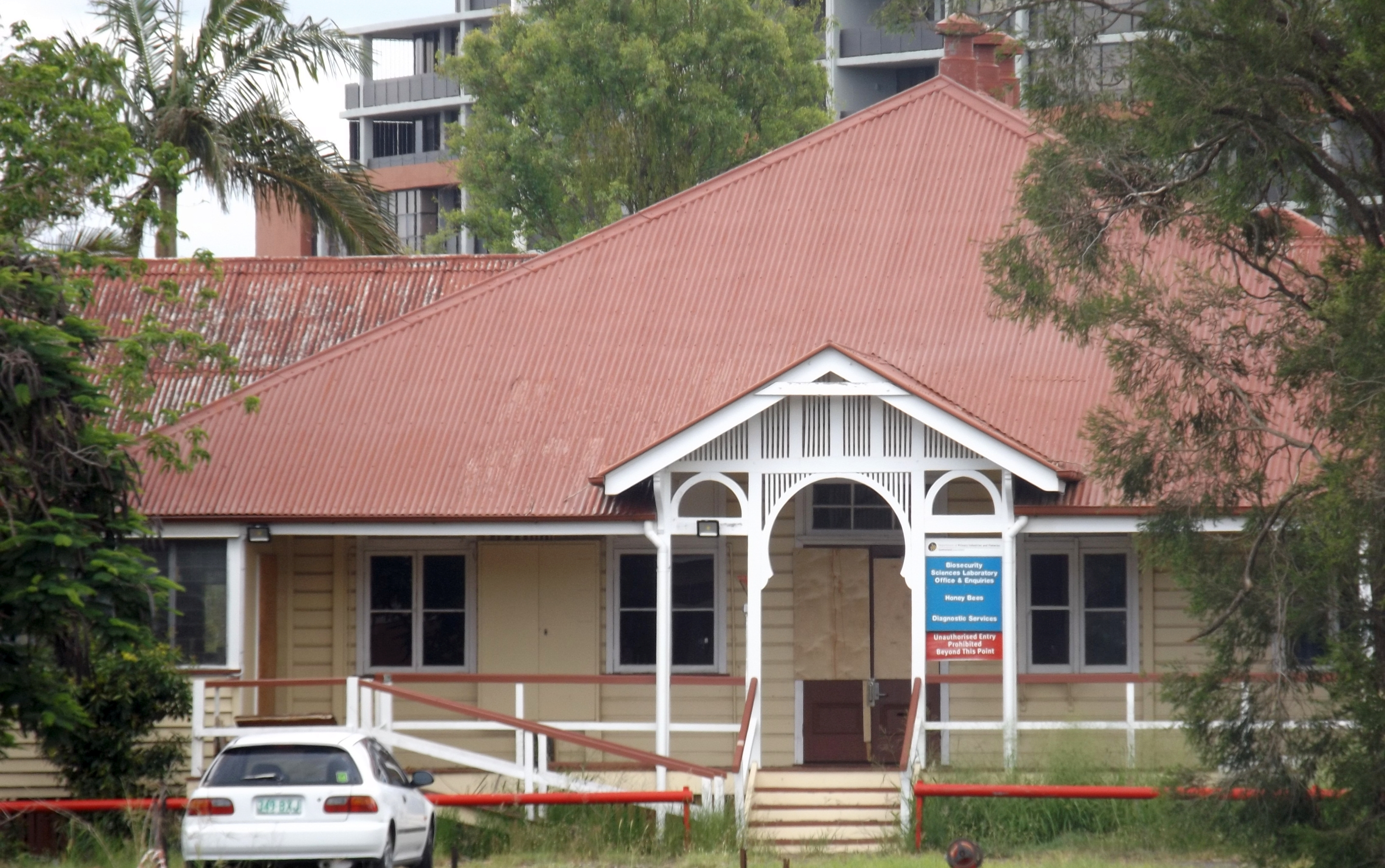
Building undergoing redevelopment in 2015

In January 2014 a draft plan for redevelopment of the 14-hectare site of the former Institute was released by the Queensland Government. It proposed the Yeerongpilly transit-oriented development to establish urban communities around transit stations.

== See also ==
- Department of Primary Industries, Queensland
- Centre for Advanced Animal Science (CAAS), University of Queensland Gatton Campus
- Ecosciences Precinct, Dutton Park
- Health and Food Sciences Precinct, Coopers Plains
