= Sydney Dodd =

British veterinary surgeon and scientist

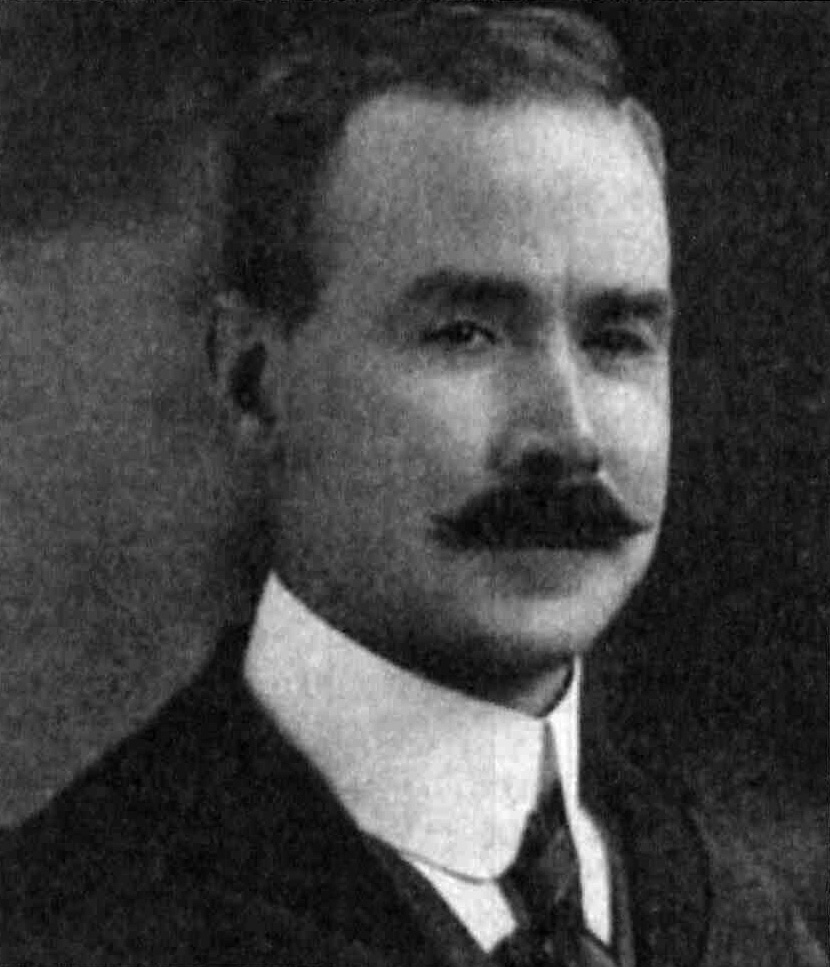
- Born: c. 1874; Sevenoaks, Kent, England
- Died: 20 October 1926; Sydney, Australia
- Scientific career
- Fields: Veterinary Pathology, Bacteriology, and Protozoology
- Institutions: University of Sydney; Animal Research Institute, Yeerongpilly; Daspoort Laboratories, Pretoria; Royal Veterinary College
- Thesis: Spirochaetosis in Fowls in Queensland (1910)

Sydney Dodd, FRCVS (c. 1874 – 20 October 1926), was a British veterinary surgeon and scientist. He contributed to the development of bacteriology and protozoology in England, South Africa and Australia. Dodd established a research station in Queensland that was to become the Animal Research Institute, and he was the first lecturer in veterinary bacteriology at the University of Sydney. He became one of the foremost bacteriologists in Australia.

== Family ==
Sydney Dodd was born about 1874 in Sevenoaks, Kent, England. His parents were Francis Dodd (born c. 1827, Ireland), and Amy Dodd (born c. 1842, Sittingbourne, Kent). He had at least two older brothers, George and William, and a younger brother Francis.

He married Clara (also known as Clare) Annie Brooker, a hospital nurse (born 1879, Chatham, Kent), in 1904 while living in Wealdstone, Middlesex.

Dodd died in 1926 after a short illness at his home in Cremorne, Sydney, Australia, and his remains were taken to the Rookwood Crematorium in Sydney for interment.

== Education ==
Dodd graduated in 1902 with honours from the Royal Veterinary College, London, becoming a member of the Royal College of Veterinary Surgeons (MRCVS).

In 1910 the University of Melbourne conferred on him the degree of Doctor of Veterinary Science. His thesis was: Spirochaetosis in Fowls in Queensland.

== Career ==
After graduating, Dodd initially continued at the Royal Veterinary College as Demonstrator of Pathology and assistant to John McFadyean, Professor of Pathology and Bacteriology and a leading veterinary scientist. This post provided Dodd with experience in veterinary research and vaccine preparation. Throughout his career Dodd was to publish many of his scientific papers in the quarterly started and edited by McFadyean, The Journal of Comparative Pathology and Therapeutics ISSN 0368-1742.

=== South Africa ===
Dodd had served during the Boer War prior to his veterinary qualification. In 1905 after returning to South Africa he became the assistant government veterinary bacteriologist to Arnold Theiler at the Daspoort laboratories in Pretoria. In addition to taking charge of vaccine production, his research work was notable for spirochaetosis in livestock and is credited for recognising its bacterial cause in pigs which was published in 1906 as "'A Disease of the Pig, due to a Spirochæta". While in South Africa he contracted typhoid in early 1907.

It was in South Africa that Dodd gained experience with tick-borne diseases of livestock. In 1907 he was admitted a fellow of the Royal College of Veterinary Surgeons (FRCVS). His fellowship resulted in part by investigating a then unknown respiratory infection in turkeys, "Epizootic Pneumo-enteritus of the Turkey" (1905), later deemed likely to have been infectious sinusitis (caused by Mycoplasma gallisepticum) complicated with fowl cholera.

=== Queensland ===
The Queensland Government engaged Dodd in 1907 as Principal Veterinary Surgeon and Bacteriologist, following a cattle tick conference in May of that year. Instructed by the Queensland Government, Dodd visited North America on-route to Australia to investigate bovine tick fever in the United States and Canada (also known as redwater or Texas fever: see babesiosis, anaplasmosis).

In Queensland Dodd proposed an experimental farm for livestock disease which he established as the Stock Experiment Station in 1909 at Yeerongpilly, Brisbane, later to become the Animal Research Institute. His research at this time included the first detection in Australia of a species of Theileria in cattle, a parasitic protozoan, published in 1910 as "Piroplasmosis of Cattle in Queensland".

Dodd resigned from the Queensland Department of Agriculture and Stock in April 1910, dissatisfied after seeking clarification of his duties.

=== Sydney University ===
In 1911, Dodd was appointed the first lecturer in veterinary bacteriology at the University of Sydney. He also lectured in veterinary pathology and was an honorary lecturer in preventive medicine at the University, where he remained until his death in 1926.

Along with teaching, Dodd continued to perform valuable research. His work on black disease in sheep found an association between the causal bacterium and a liver fluke, "The Etiology of Black Disease: Being Further Studies in a Braxy-Like Disease of Sheep" (1921).

== Military service ==
Before qualifying, Dodd served in South Africa with the British Army during the Second Boer War (1899–1902). Descriptions of his service include joining the Army Veterinary Department, and veterinary officer to the 10th Hussars.

At the start of World War I, Dodd was commissioned a captain in the Australian Army Veterinary Corps. He served with the Sea Transport Service on the Barambah taking troops and horses to Egypt in December 1914, and his service ended after returning to Australia on the Maiwu in March, 1915.

== Recognition ==
Shortly after his death, the Sydney Dodd Memorial Committee was formed in 1927 to honour his contributions to veterinary research and teaching. Funds were raised and a bronze bust by G. Rayner Hoff was unveiled at the Veterinary School of the University of Sydney in 1928.
