= Yeerongpilly =

- Suburb
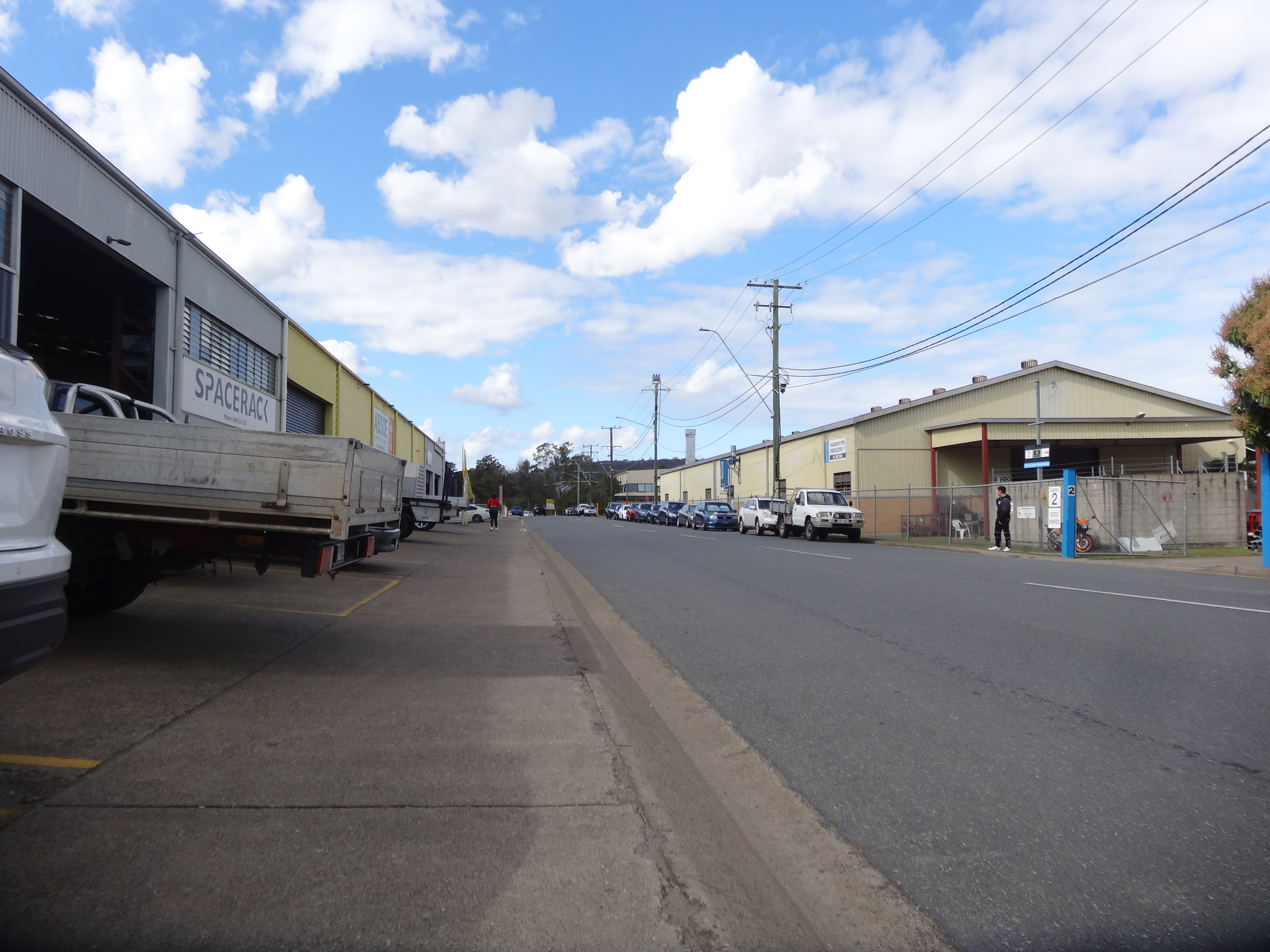
- Station Road Industrial Area

- Interactive map of Yeerongpilly
- Coordinates: 27.5300°S 153.0119°E
- Country: Australia
- State: Queensland
- City: Brisbane
- LGA: City of Brisbane (Tennyson Ward)
- Location: 8.5 km (5.3 mi) SW of Brisbane CBD

Government
  - State electorate: Miller
  - Federal division: Moreton

Area
  - Total: 1.9 km^{2} (0.73 sq mi)

Population
  - Total: 2,033 (2021 census)
  - Density: 1,070/km^{2} (2,770/sq mi)
- Time zone: UTC+10:00 (AEST)
- Postcode: 4105
Suburbs around Yeerongpilly
Indooroopilly	Yeronga	Annerley
Tennyson	Yeerongpilly	Moorooka
Rocklea	Rocklea	Moorooka

Yeerongpilly is a southern suburb in the City of Brisbane, Queensland, Australia. In the 2021 census, Yeerongpilly had a population of 2,033 people.

== Geography ==
Yeerongpilly is 8.5 kilometres (5.3 mi) south-west of the Brisbane GPO.

A small section of the north eastern boundary runs along Ipswich Road.

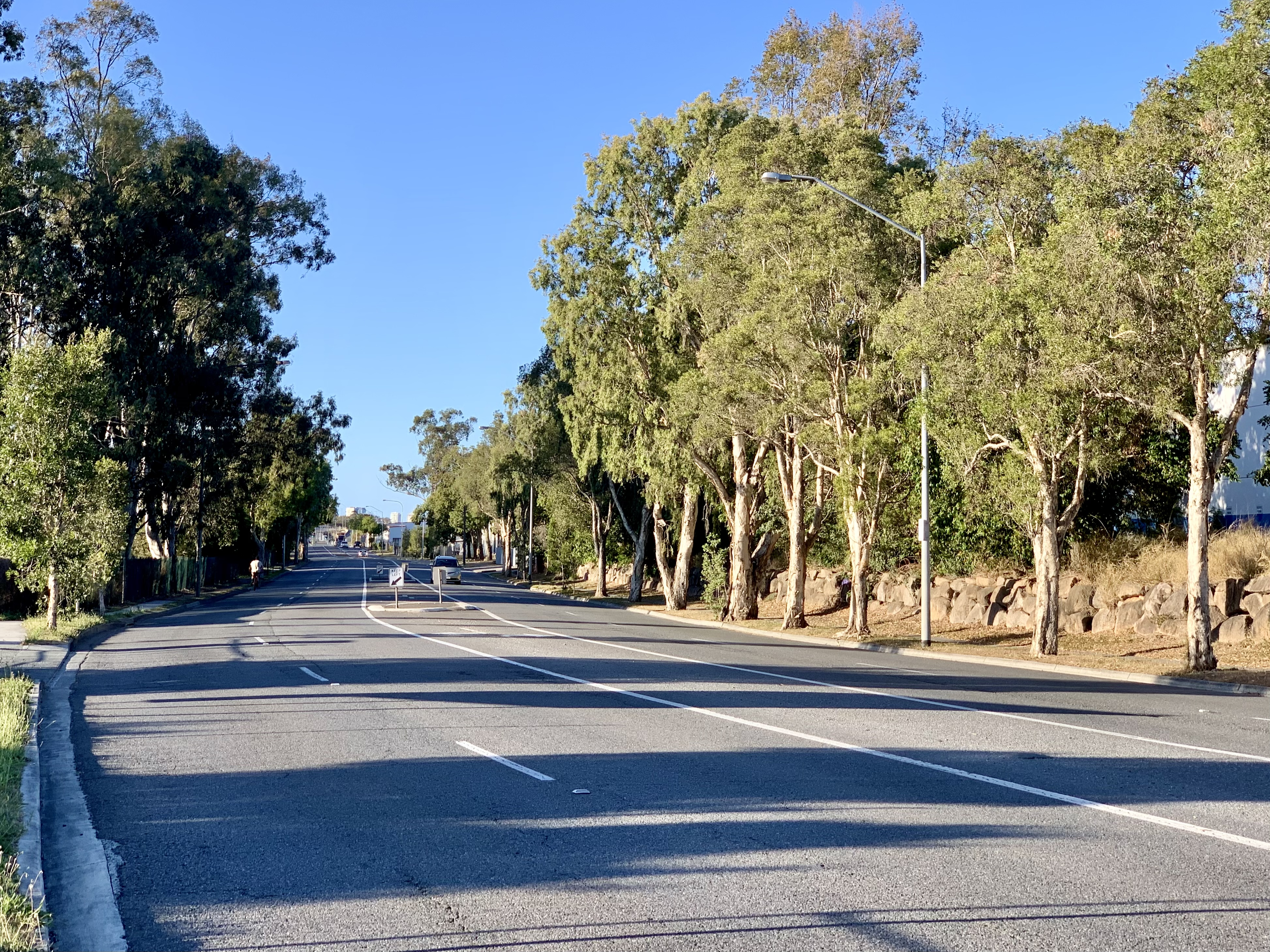
Fairfield Road

== History ==
Yeerongpilly is an Aboriginal word meaning rain coming according to Thomas Petrie or is derived from the Aboriginal words yurong meaning rain or yarung meaning sandy or gravelly. The suffix "pilly" means a gully or watercourse.

Yeerongpilly grew from an area named Boggo, which was logged for timber for Brisbane.

In April 1885, "Lathorn Estate" made up of 118 allotments were advertised to be auctioned by James R. Dickson & Co. A map advertising the auction states the Estate consisted of 118 subdivisions of 131 Portion, Parish of Yeerongpilly. Newspaper advertising states the Estate was "situated at the junction of Ipswich and Boggo Roads" and "within a quarter of a mile of Yeerong Railway Station".

In October 1887, 24 large allotments of the "Ortive Estate" were advertised to be auctioned by G. T. Bell, Auctioneer. A map advertising the auction states the Estate was "close to South Coast Junction Railway Station." Newspaper advertising states the Estate was "within stone throw of railway station" with "24 grand large-sized building allotments, all over 20 perches".

In February 1890, "Grand View Estate" made up of 18 allotments were advertised to be auctioned by John W. Todd. A map advertising the auction states the Estate was bordered by Fairfield Road and Boundary Road. Newspaper advertising states the Estate was "directly opposite the South Brisbane cemetery" and offers "magnificent views of the River, Mountains and surrounding land."

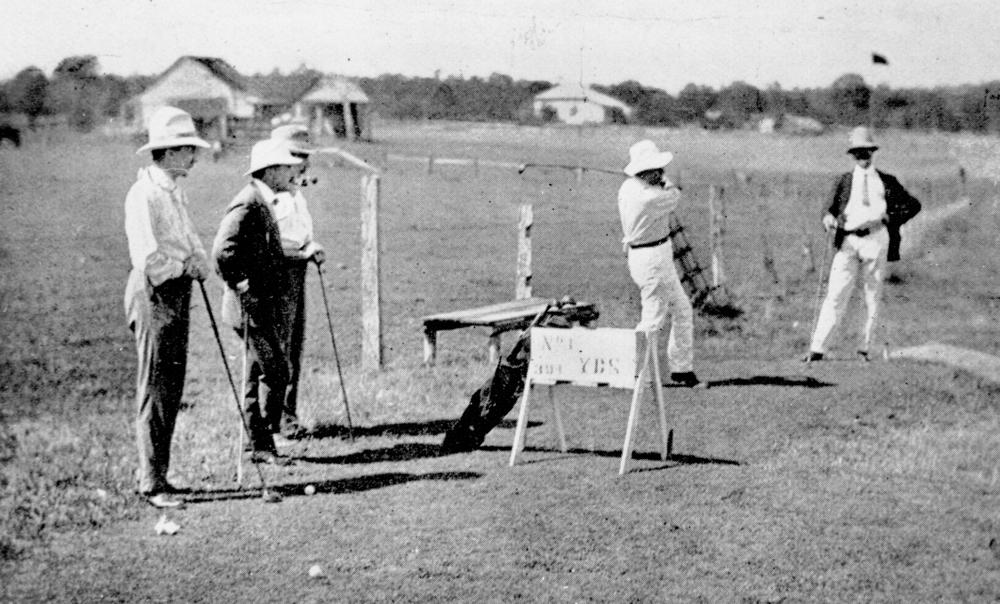
Golfers tee off at the Brisbane Golf Club Championship Tournament at Yeerongpilly Links, Brisbane, 1910

The Brisbane Golf Club was established in the suburb in 1896.

A Queensland Government research complex, last known as the Animal Research Institute, occupied a site adjacent to Fairfield Road from 1909 to 2011.

In October 1927, 14 allotments of "Riverside Estate" were advertised to be auctioned by Thornton & Pearce, Auctioneers. A map advertising the auction states that the Estate was "only a few yards from Tennyson station, within easy walking distance". Newspaper advertising states the Estate allotments were "the last of the select, High River frontage sites" with "appealing views of the river and mountains".

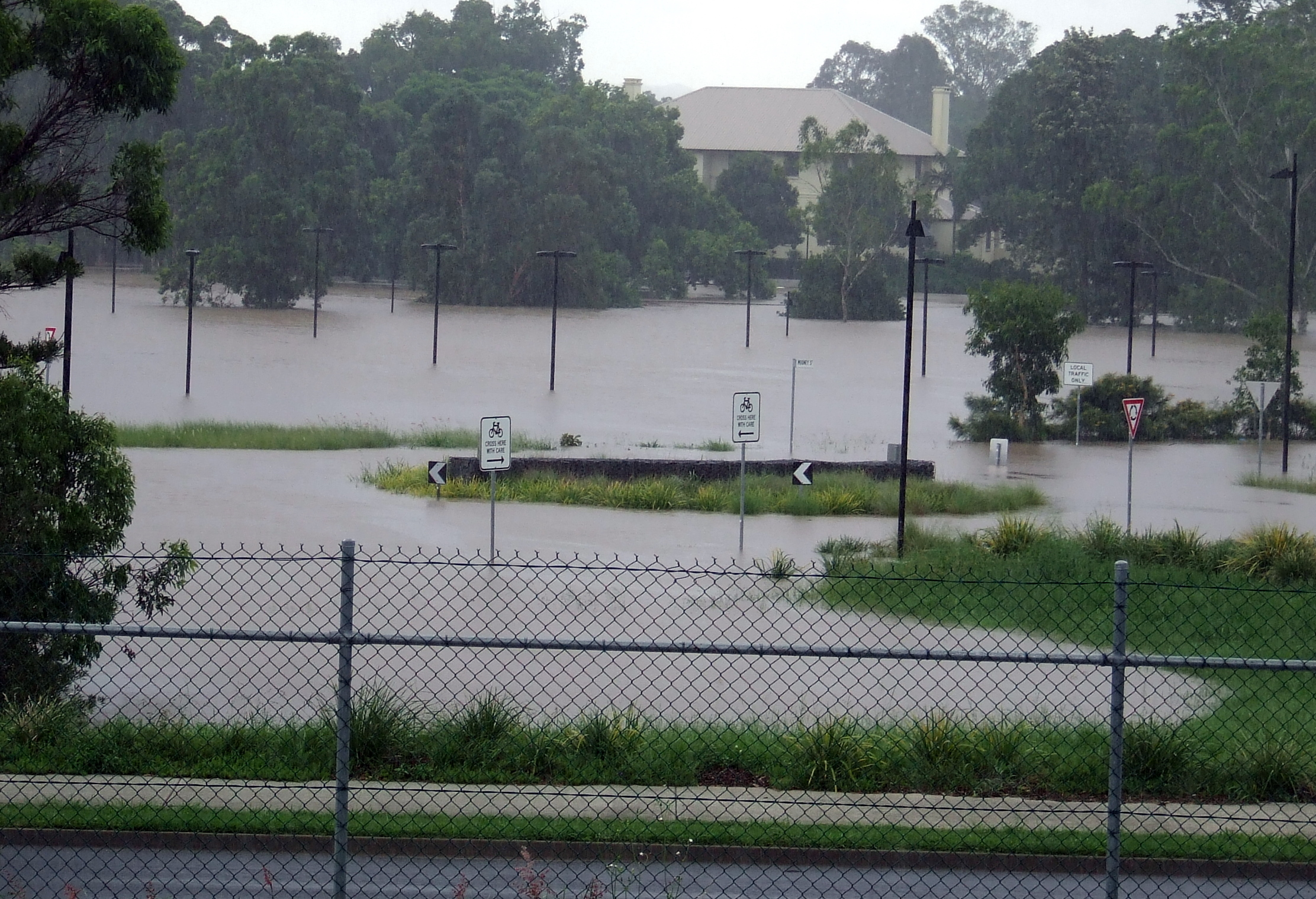
2010–2011 Queensland floods

The Brisbane River makes up a very small section of the northern boundary of the locality while a small section of the western boundary follows Oxley Creek. Parts of Yeerongpilly were affected by the 2010–2011 Queensland floods. Insurance claims for damage created by the flood were the second highest in the state, according to Suncorp Insurance.

== Demographics ==
In the 2016 census, Yeerongpilly had a population of 1,934 people, 50.8% female and 49.2% male. The median age of the Yeerongpilly population was 32 years. The most common ancestries in Yeerongpilly were English 25.9%, Australian 21.0%, Irish 11.6%, Scottish 8.5% and German 4.0%. In Yeerongpilly (State Suburbs), 70.2% of people were born in Australia. The most common countries of birth were New Zealand 3.6%, England 3.4%, India 1.9%, Vietnam 1.5% and China (excludes SARs and Taiwan) 1.3%. 78.1% of people only spoke English at home. Other languages spoken at home included Vietnamese 2.1%, Mandarin 1.4%, Arabic 1.1%, Cantonese 1.0% and Spanish 0.9%.

In the 2021 census, Yeerongpilly had a population of 2,033 people.

== Heritage listings ==
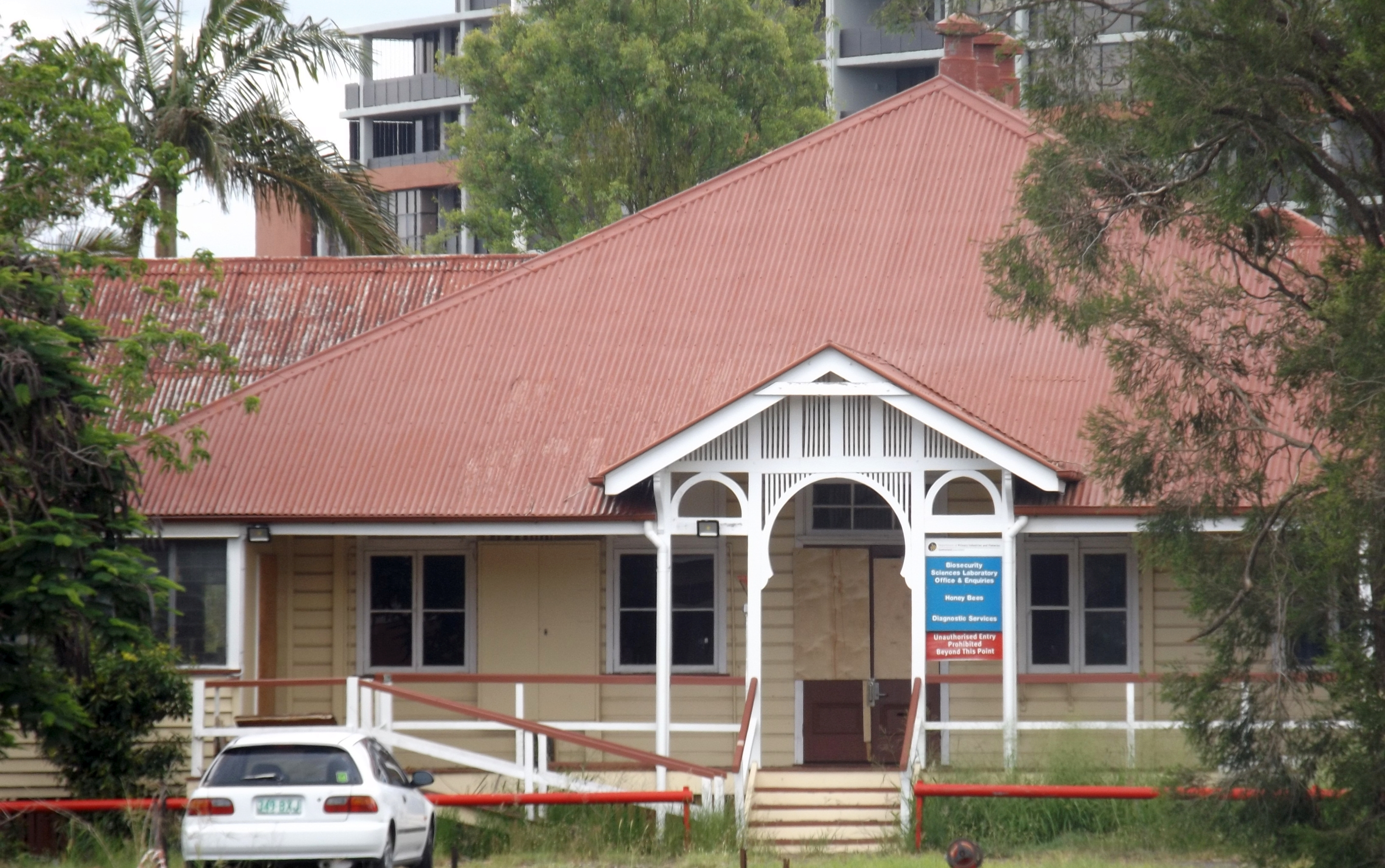
Animal Research Institute

Yeerongpilly has a number of heritage-listed sites, including:

- Trainmen's Quarters, 740 Fairfield Road
- Animal Research Institute Buildings, 681 Fairfield Road & 41 Godiva Street
- Craigilea (house), 14 Grosvenor Street
- former St Giles Uniting Church (also known as Yeerongpilly Presbyterian Church), 53 Nathan Terrace
- Revoncourt (house), 12 Tees Street
- Brisbane Golf Club Clubhouse, 70 Tennyson Memorial Avenue
- Warra (house), 32 Wingarra Street

== Education ==
There are no schools in Yeerongpilly. The nearest government primary school is Yeronga State School in Yeronga to the north. The nearest government secondary school is Yeronga State High School in Yeronga.

== Transport ==
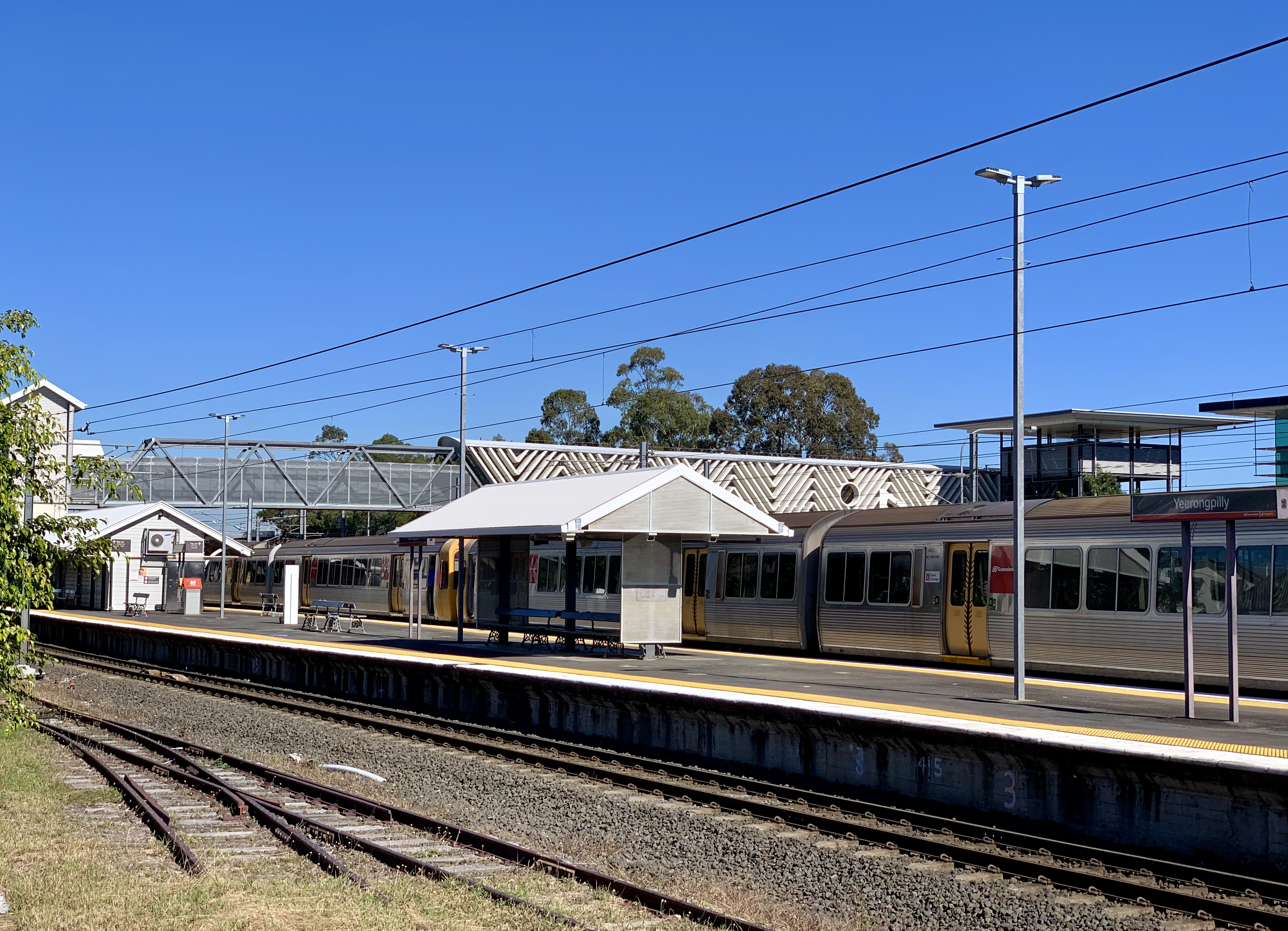
Yeerongpilly railway station, 2019

Yeerongpilly railway station provides access to regular Queensland Rail City network services to Brisbane, Beenleigh and Ferny Grove.

The original proposal for the Cross River Rail project was to have its southern tunnel portal approximately at the Cardross St overbridge. The current proposal has relocated the southern tunnel portal to Dutton Park.

== Sport ==
The Brisbane Golf Club is a 36 hole, private golf club and includes facilities such as driving range and pro shop.

== Notable people ==
- Ken Archer, an Australian cricketer was born in the suburb in 1928.
- Marty Mayberry, a double leg amputee Paralympic alpine skier born in 1986.

== See also ==
- Shire of Yeerongpilly
