= Veterinary pathology =

Component of pathology that focuses on the application of veterinary science

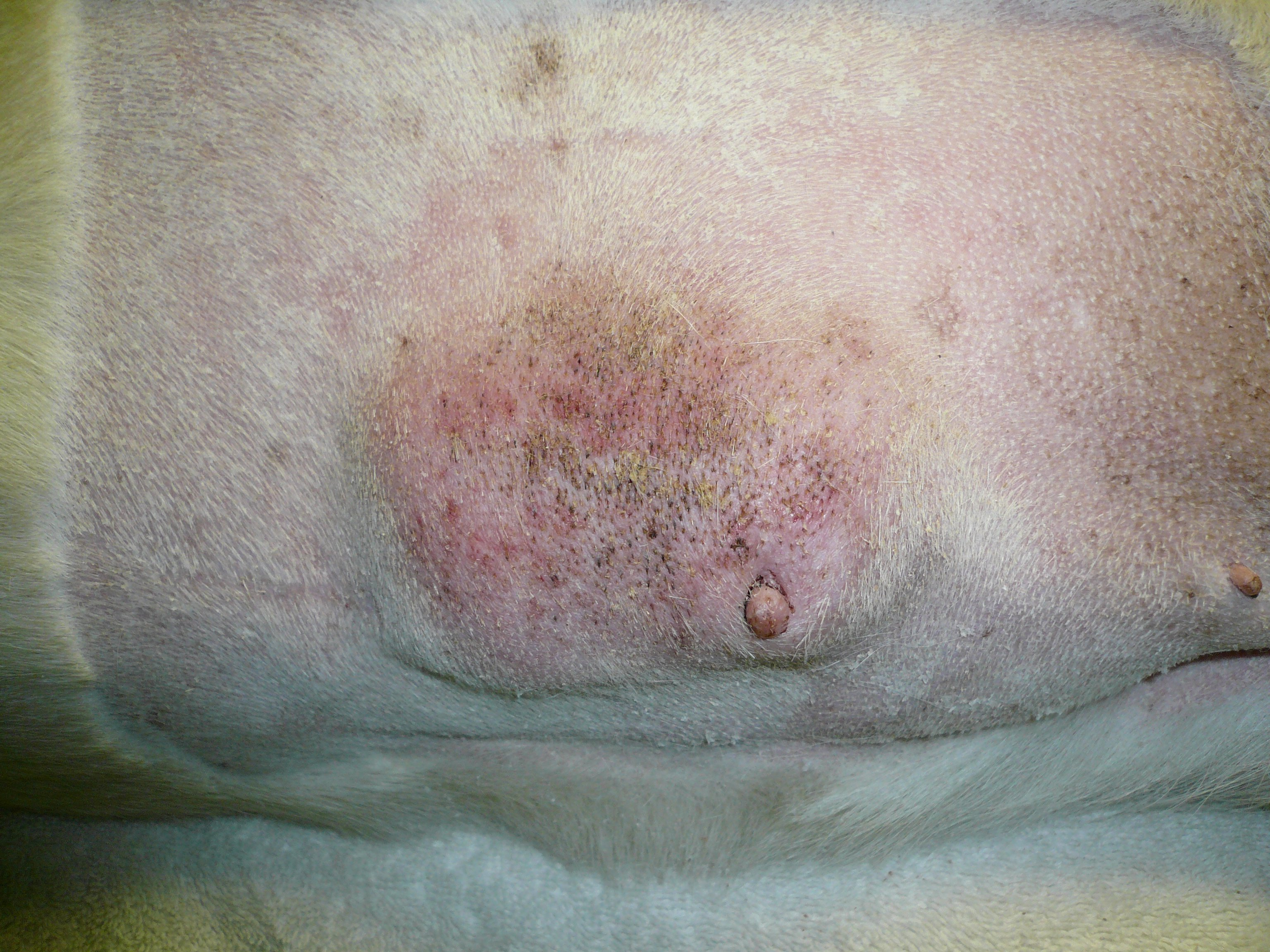
Mammary (breast) cancer on a dog.

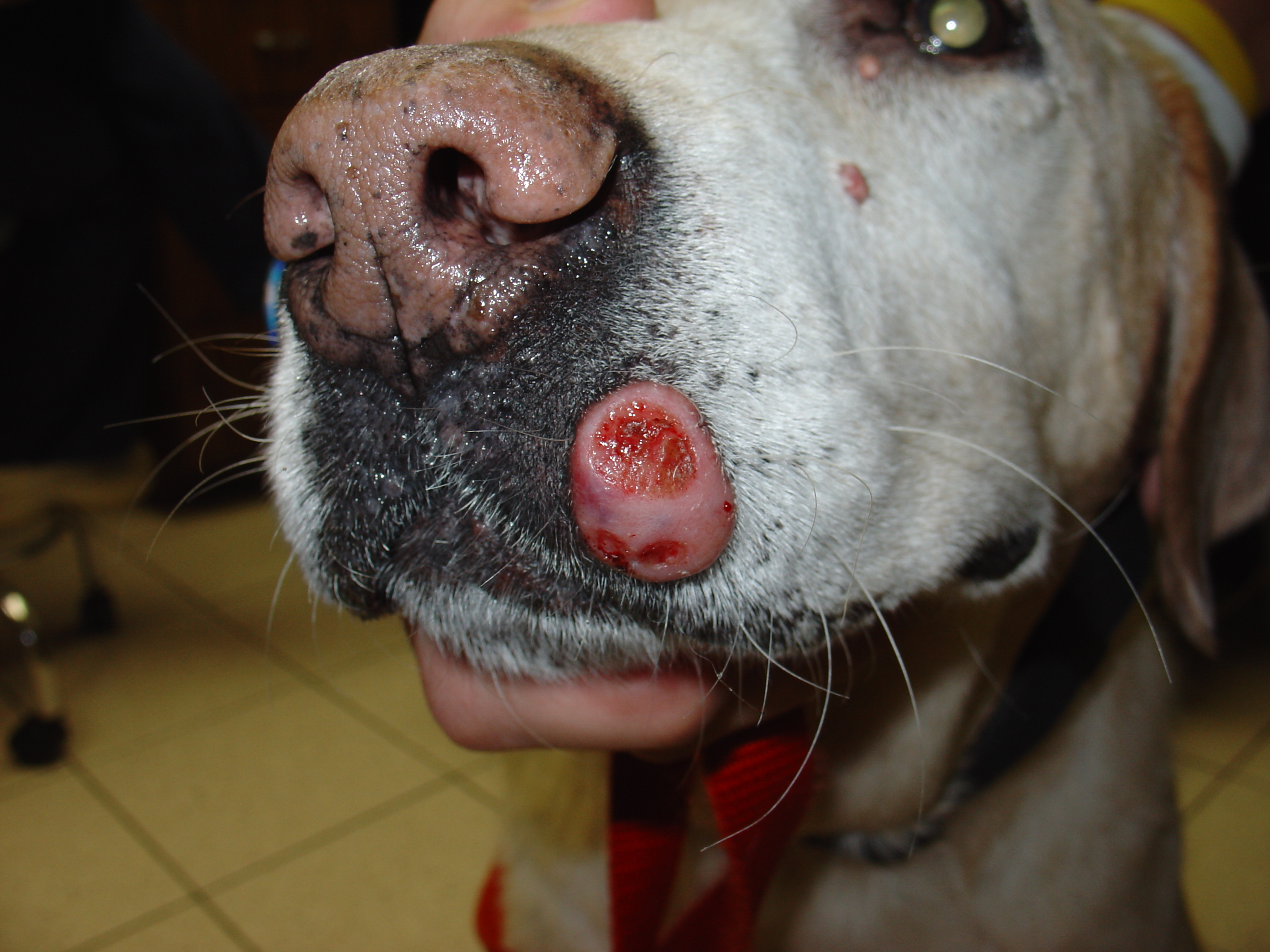
Mast cell tumor on dog.

Veterinary pathologists are veterinarians who specialize in the diagnosis of diseases through the examination of animal tissue and body fluids. Like medical pathology, veterinary pathology is divided into two branches, anatomical pathology and clinical pathology. Other than the diagnosis of disease in food-producing animals, companion animals, zoo animals and wildlife, veterinary pathologists also have an important role in drug discovery and safety as well as scientific research.

== Veterinary anatomical pathology ==
Anatomical pathology (Commonwealth) or anatomic pathology (U.S.) is concerned with the diagnosis of disease based on the gross examination, microscopic, and molecular examination of organs, tissues, and whole bodies (necropsy). Veterinary pathology also takes into account the structure and function of the body and how particular cells were injured. The Indian, European, Japanese, and American Colleges of Veterinary Pathologists certify veterinary pathologists through a certifying exam after completing a residency program. After completing the residency and the exam, a certificate will be given out to display specialization in veterinary pathology. The American College of Veterinary Pathologist certification exam consists of four parts, - gross pathology, microscopic pathology, veterinary pathology, and general pathology. Only the general pathology section is shared between the anatomic and clinical pathology examinations. Veterinary pathologists are employed in several different positions, including diagnostics, teaching, research, and the pharmaceutical industry.

== Veterinary clinical pathology ==
Clinical pathology is concerned with the diagnosis of disease based on the laboratory analysis of bodily fluids such as blood, urine or cavitary effusions, or tissue aspirates using the tools of chemistry, microbiology, hematology, and molecular pathology. Clinical pathology labs offer many services including hematology, hemostasis, urinalysis, cytology, and clinical biochemistry tests. Many clinical pathology tests can be done "in" or "out" of house, meaning that the test can be done in that particular clinic or sent to a further specialized outside laboratory. Many patients have the desire to do "in-house" tests because it is usually cheaper. Ultimately, veterinary pathology consists of most of the behind-the-scenes laboratory work that studies virus, infections, bacteria, and much more. Without veterinary pathologists, illness would spread throughout many species of animals much quicker than in the present day.

== See also ==
- Veterinary medicine
