= Pollock's Shop House =

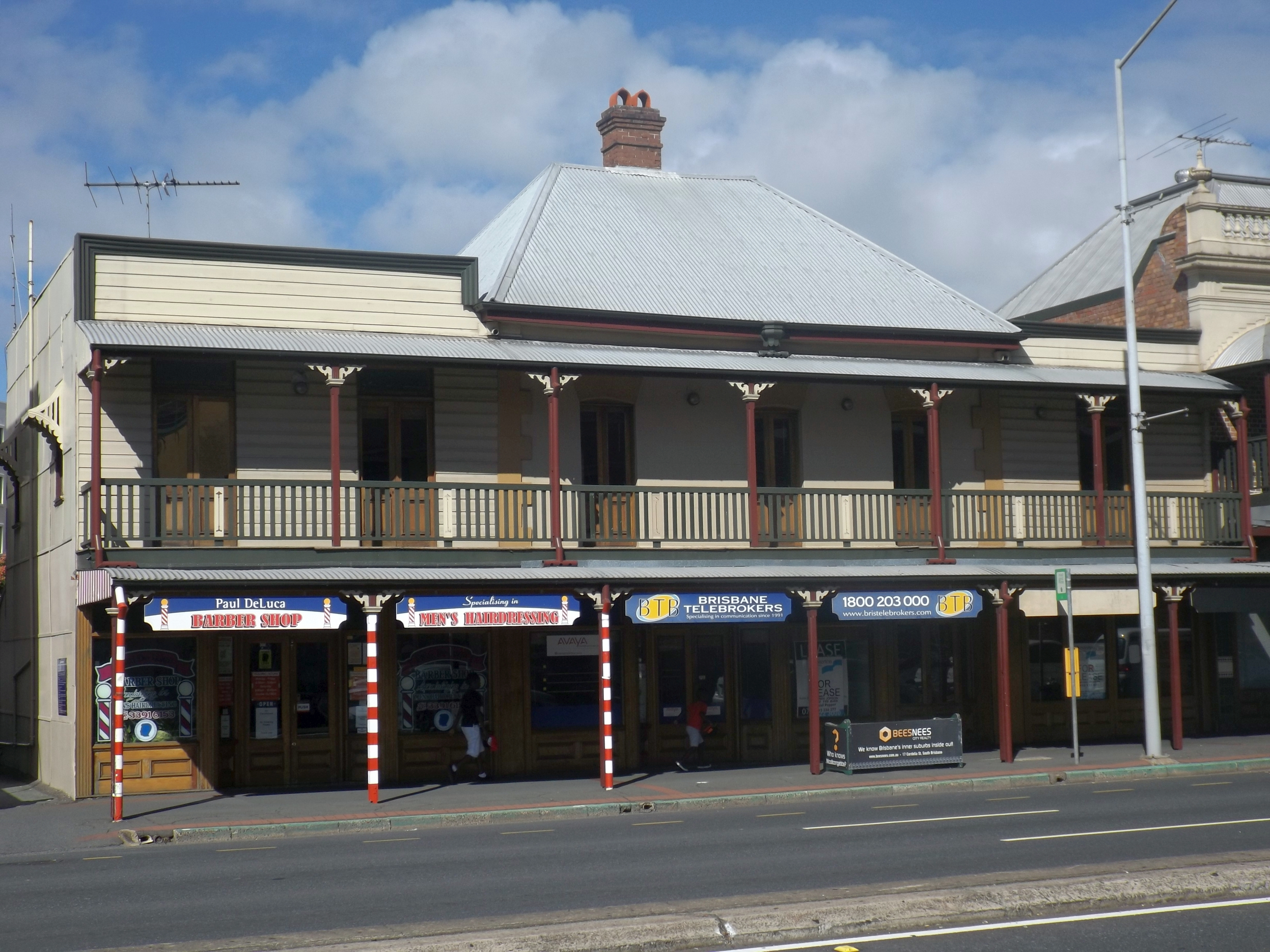
- Building in 2015

- Location within Queensland Location within Australia
- 27.486°S 153.0298°E
- Location: 617–619 Stanley Street, Woolloongabba, City of Brisbane, Queensland, Australia

History
- Design period: 1840s–1860s (mid-19th century)
- Built: c. 1865

Queensland Heritage Register
- Official name: Pollock's Shop House
- Type: state heritage (built)
- Designated: 21 October 1992
- Reference no.: 600356
- Significant period: 1860s (fabric) c. 1865–ongoing (historical use as shops)
- Significant components: residential accommodation – manager's house/quarters, laneway

Pollock's Shop House is a heritage-listed general store at 617–619 Stanley Street, Woolloongabba, City of Brisbane, Queensland, Australia. It was built c. 1865. It was added to the Queensland Heritage Register on 21 October 1992.

== History ==
This two-storeyed brick building was constructed in the mid-1860s, either for Brisbane businessman and contractor William Pettigrew, who acquired the site in December 1864, or for Brisbane contractor and butcher Alexander Pollock, who acquired title to the site, (then part of the Clarence Estate), in April 1865.

It was one of the earliest masonry buildings at One-mile Swamp (Woolloongabba), erected during the 1860s development of that part of Stanley Street as an early commercial centre.

One-mile Swamp received an investment boost in the early and mid-1860s, following diversion of the Toowoomba mail from South Brisbane to Kangaroo Point, the formation of the New Ipswich Road, (avoiding the Old Ipswich or Boggo (Boghole) Road - later Annerley Road), and the opening of Brisbane's first cross river bridge (Victoria Bridge) at South Brisbane in June 1865.

These developments stimulated land investment at One-mile Swamp, and in 1864 the Clarence Town Estate was offered for sale. This parcel of land, which comprised 7 acres (2.8 ha) with frontages to Stanley Street and Boggo and Merton Roads, had been alienated in 1856 by Thomas Grenier of Brisbane. It was sold to publican Thomas Hayselden in 1863, and the first Clarence Hotel, at the corner of Stanley Street (by then the main Ipswich Road) and Boggo Road, was opened by Hayselden in January 1864.

When Hayselden's Clarence Estate and neighbouring One-mile Swamp or Woolloongabba allotments were being advertised for auction or sale in 1864–65, the potential of the area for both small business and residential purposes was emphasised. Suddenly, in the mid-1860s, an area which previously had been defined by little other than three Hotels - the Clarence at the intersection of the old and new Ipswich Roads, Scanlan's hotel at the Woolloongabba fiveways, and the Buffalo at the corner of Hawthorne Road and New Ipswich Road - acquired a string of small businesses fronting the new Ipswich Road beyond Boggo Road. Amongst these was Pollock's shop house.

Until well into the 1870s, One-mile Swamp was a separate settlement from South Brisbane and Kangaroo Point, and early progress was associated with the traffic from the interior – bullock teams converging on One-mile Swamp from the old and new Ipswich Roads, and the Logan and Cleveland Roads. A further stimulus to development of the area came with the discovery of beds of clay amongst the string of waterholes and marshes which comprised the One-mile Swamp. It is understood that a brickworks was established near the site of the Woolloongabba cricket ground c. 1856, and that several other such establishments followed in the One-mile Swamp/Kangaroo Point area, flourishing in the 1860s and 1870s.

It is likely that the bricks used in the construction of Pollock's shop-house came from the One-mile Swamp brickworks, and survive to illustrate one of the earliest industries of Woolloongabba.

Alexander Pollock was bankrupted in the crash of 1866–67, and although reputedly he later retrieved his fortune in the Gympie goldrush, was forced to forfeit the Stanley Street property to a mortgagee in 1868.

Since that time a variety of small businesses have operated from the ground floor premises, which totalled four shops by the twentieth century. One of the more enduring businesses established in the building was the oyster saloon run by Luigi Cervetto, fish merchant, who acquired the property in 1912, and neighbouring subdivision 10 in 1920. The Cervetto family retained both sites until 1956. The first floor has been rented as boarding rooms, and more recently occupied by squatters.

== Description ==
Pollock's Shop House is situated in Stanley Street between Clarence Corner and Merton Road, adjacent to Hillyard's Shop House, another c. 1865 two-storeyed brick building. A narrow laneway runs along the east face of the building, which has a sealed bitumen carpark at the rear.

The building consists of a two storeyed brick core, square in plan, with early double storeyed timber additions to either side, and a single storeyed extension to the rear.

There is a hipped roof on the central brick core, with inward sloping skillion roofs on each side wing that drain to box gutters fixed to the brick walls, and a skillion roof to the rear extension.

The building has a pleasing balance in its design, with two symmetrically placed window openings in the upper level of the plain brick rear facade, and three door openings to the Stanley Street verandah.

Despite the unequal sizes of the side additions, the building's appearance is unified by a street awning and verandah that run the full width of the Stanley Street elevation, with a chamferboard parapet each side of the central roof; and by the rear extension which also spans the full width of the facade.

The eastern facade and the verandah are oversheeted with fibro, as is the soffit of the street awning.

Facebrick coursing of the central core is English Bond brickwork, with corner quoins to the Stanley Street elevation, and round headed openings with sandstone sills at first floor level in the southern face, one of which has been extended to form a doorway.

Internally the central core has set plasterwork to walls, lathe and plaster ceilings, pine floors, and a timber framed roof of corrugated GI sheeting over timber shingles.

The wings are of timber, lined externally with horizontal chamferboards and internally with vertical VJ boards to walls and ceilings, and are roofed in corrugated GI sheeting.

A central chimney services both floors and joinery throughout is of cedar, including the turned staircase.

The interior of the core comprises a front shop, two back rooms in what was possibly the former kitchen, and a side stairwell on the ground floor with a side passage that is now a toilet. At the first floor level, the stairwell opens into a large parlour with French doors to the Stanley Street verandah and doorways either side of the central fireplace to two bedrooms at the rear.

In the eastern wing is a ground floor shop with two small rooms at the rear, giving access to a stair that leads to four upstairs rooms, which are symmetrically placed around a central hallway. Each upstairs room on the eastern and southern elevations has a single double hung sash window, protected by an external hood.

A ground floor shop occupies the western wing, with a room at the rear. Access to the two rooms and small bathroom upstairs is gained through a doorway to the front verandah.

Except for the westernmost shop which has a metal roller shutter, the shopfronts have glazed showcases either side of splayed and glazed reveals and central doorways, and date from early this century.

== Heritage listing ==
Pollock's Shop House was listed on the Queensland Heritage Register on 21 October 1992 having satisfied the following criteria.

The place is important in demonstrating the evolution or pattern of Queensland's history.

It provides rare evidence of the early commercial development of One-Mile Swamp/ Woolloongabba in the mid-1860s; of the early brickmaking industry associated with the area at this time, of which little record, either physical or written, survives; and of 1860s brick construction technique and stylistic and aesthetic choices.

The place demonstrates rare, uncommon or endangered aspects of Queensland's cultural heritage.

Pollock's Shop House is one of few two-storeyed, brick, 1860s shop houses to survive in Brisbane. It provides rare evidence of the early commercial development of One-Mile Swamp/ Woolloongabba in the mid-1860s; of the early brickmaking industry associated with the area at this time, of which little record, either physical or written, survives; and of 1860s brick construction technique and stylistic and aesthetic choices.

The place is important in demonstrating the principal characteristics of a particular class of cultural places.

As a substantially intact, detached, two-storeyed brick shop house, this building is particularly important in illustrating a past way of life.

The place is important because of its aesthetic significance.

As an integral part of the Clarence Corner streetscape, and one of a pair of c. 1865 two-storeyed brick shop houses on adjacent properties fronting Stanley Street, this building contributes strongly to the Woolloongabba townscape.
