= Hillyards Shop House =

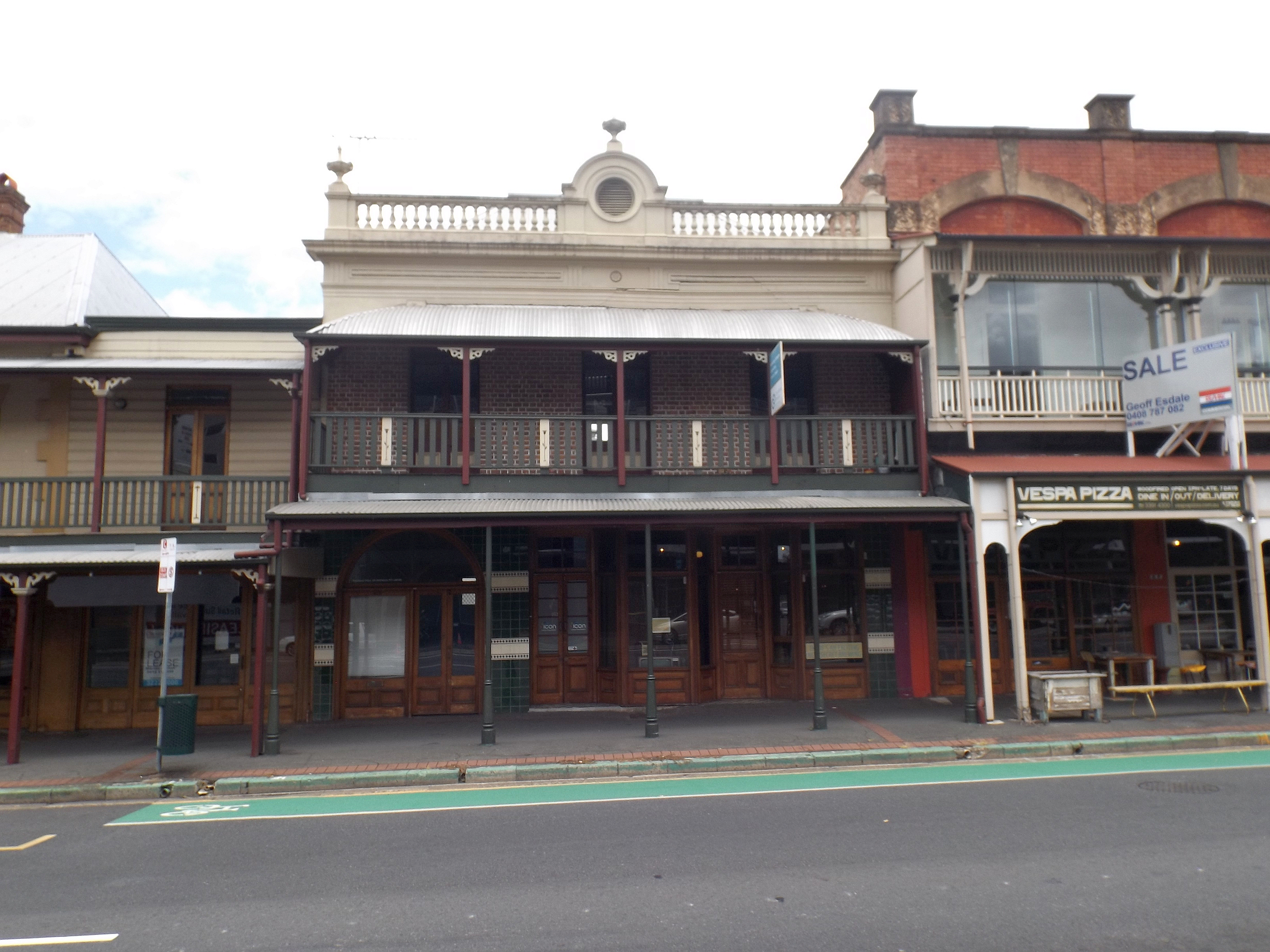
- Building in 2015

- Location within Queensland Location within Australia
- 27.4859°S 153.0296°E
- Location: 615 Stanley Street, Woolloongabba, City of Brisbane, Queensland, Australia

History
- Design period: 1840s–1860s (mid-19th century)
- Built: c. 1865, 1920s
- Built for: George Hillyard

Queensland Heritage Register
- Official name: Hillyards Shop House
- Type: state heritage (built)
- Designated: 21 October 1992
- Reference no.: 601059
- Significant period: 1860s, 1920s (fabric) c. 1865–ongoing (historical commercial use)
- Significant components: carriage way/drive, residential accommodation – manager's house/quarters

Hillyards Shop House is a heritage-listed general store at 615 Stanley Street, Woolloongabba, City of Brisbane, Queensland, Australia. It was built c. 1865 and remodelled in the 1920s. It was added to the Queensland Heritage Register on 21 October 1992.

== History ==
This two-storeyed brick shop house was constructed in the mid-1860s for Brisbane watchmaker George Hillyard, who purchased the site in 1865.

It was one of the earliest masonry buildings at One-mile Swamp (Woolloongabba), erected during the 1860s development of that part of Stanley Street as an early commercial centre.

The Hillyard family ran a successful watchmaking and jewellery business from the premises for nearly twenty years. Their shop boasted a clock tower at some stage, an advertisement which served as a convenience for passing travellers and drovers.

After George Hillyard died in 1881 his widow opened a fancy toy shop in part of the building, and William Hillyard continued with the watchmaking business. They sold the Stanley Street property in 1885.

Over the subsequent century a variety of small businesses have operated from the ground floor, with the first floor rented as boarding rooms and more recently occupied by squatters.

== Description ==
Hillyards shop house is situated in Stanley Street between Clarence Corner and Merton Road, and adjacent to Pollocks shop house, another c.1865 two-storeyed brick building.

The building comprises a main shop on the ground floor, residential accommodation on the first floor, an arched covered carriage-way through to the rear of the property, and a brick and iron skillion-roofed kitchen extension, which projects as a one-storeyed wing at the rear along the western side. The carriage-way has been enclosed to create another shop.

The core is capped by a steeply pitched corrugated-iron roof with a square platform at the top. Probably it was shingled originally.

The front facade is distinguished by a small rendered brick parapet, possibly of later origin, which returns unrendered along both sides of the building. This parapet features three decorative urns and a pediment with a central circular opening which houses a ventilation duct leading via a small gable into the roof.

A cantilevered iron-roofed first floor verandah has been boarded over, and a curved iron street awning is supported by slender cast iron and modern steel columns.

The ground floor has been altered and the main shop facade appears to have been remodelled in the 1920s.

The first floor is substantially intact. It contains five rooms, including a large front parlour. Twelve feet high, timber tongue and groove lined ceilings feature central circular ventilators. The 370-millimetre (15 in) brick walls are plaster lined and divided internally by walls of eight inch wide tongue and groove vertical joint boards, with narrow timber picture rails and wide skirting boards. Three sets of wide French doors with single pane fanlights open onto the front verandah.

The kitchen wing consists of three rooms with a double fireplace, probably initially housing kitchen, dining room and servant's room.

Despite a number of modifications, the building retains much of the original character. The most significant alterations are the removal of both the early clock tower and the internal staircase.

== Heritage listing ==
Hillyards Shop House was listed on the Queensland Heritage Register on 21 October 1992 having satisfied the following criteria.

The place is important in demonstrating the evolution or pattern of Queensland's history.

Hillyard's Shop House is a rare surviving 1860s detached brick shop house complete with service wing and covered carriage-way, indicative of a way of life no longer common in Brisbane, and is important for its association with the early commercial development of the One-mile Swamp (Woolloongabba) area in the 1860s.

The place demonstrates rare, uncommon or endangered aspects of Queensland's cultural heritage.

Hillyard's Shop House is a rare surviving 1860s detached brick shop house complete with service wing and covered carriage-way, indicative of a way of life no longer common in Brisbane, and is important for its association with the early commercial development of the One-mile Swamp (Woolloongabba) area in the 1860s.

The place is important because of its aesthetic significance.

The place is an integral part of the Clarence Corner streetscape, and particularly significant as one of a pair of c. 1865 brick, two-storeyed shop houses on adjacent properties fronting Stanley Street. It makes a strong contribution to the Woolloongabba townscape.
