= Gair Park =

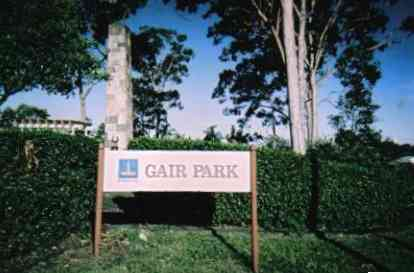
- Gair Park, 2009

- Location within Queensland Location within Australia
- 27.4967°S 153.0274°E
- Location: 181 Annerley Road, Dutton Park, City of Brisbane, Queensland, Australia

History
- Design period: 1919–1930s (interwar period)
- Built: 1936–

Queensland Heritage Register
- Official name: Gair Park
- Type: state heritage (landscape, built)
- Designated: 5 April 2004
- Reference no.: 602429
- Significant period: 1930s–ongoing (fabric); 1936–ongoing (historical park use); 1951–ongoing (historical memorial use)
- Significant components: seating, memorial – obelisk, memorial – plaque, trees/plantings, shed – shelter, tree groups – avenue of, fence/wall – perimeter

Gair Park is a heritage-listed park and memorial at 181 Annerley Road, Dutton Park, City of Brisbane, Queensland, Australia. It was built from 1936 onwards. It was added to the Queensland Heritage Register on 5 April 2004.

== History ==
Gair Park is a triangular area of land at the intersection of two major roads at Dutton Park and was developed as a park in 1936 and as a garden of remembrance and memorial following World War II. It now also commemorates subsequent conflicts.

The area now that is now known as Dutton Park was originally called Bloggo or Boggo. It was thickly timbered and cut by steep gullies. Some farms were established there in the 1840s, but there were few houses until the 1880s. As transport became available, more people moved to the district. Dutton Park railway station opened in 1884 and the first horse-drawn bus service linking Dutton Park with the Brisbane CBD began in 1890. It was replaced by electric tram in 1908, after which the area developed more rapidly. In 1914 the suburb was renamed in honour of Charles Boydell Dutton, Secretary of Public Lands between 1883 and 1887, and by the late 1920s, was considered a fashionable suburb.

In the 30 June 1929 edition of the Sunday Mail, an article generally praising the suburb commented unfavourably on the area at the intersection of Annerley Road and Gladstone Road where there was:

"a vacant triangle of public land which would make a charming little tree shaded reserve, but at the present time it remains little more than a rubbish heap, that is more of a disfigurement to the locality than an acquisition, which it would be if tided up and planted with shade trees"

Steps were taken to address this problem in 1936 when the area, previously part of the road reserve, was vested in the Brisbane City Council for general municipal purposes. It was reserved as a park and Gilchrist prepared plans for it in June 1936. In 1938 the planting of fifty trees furthered the development.

The new park was named Gair Park in honour of parliamentarian Vincent (Vince) Clair Gair, Labor Member of the Queensland Legislative Assembly for South Brisbane. Born in Rockhampton in 1901, Gair moved to Dutton Park with his parents in 1916. His family was politically active and he became Secretary of the South Brisbane branch of the Australian Labor Party and by 1924 was its president. He was first elected to the Queensland Parliament in 1932 and gained his first Ministry as Secretary for Mines in 1942. He became Minister for Labour and Employment 1944–50 and Deputy Premier in 1947. In 1950 he became Treasurer and was Queensland Premier in 1951. He introduced the 40-hour working week and was associated with the modernisation of the Factory and Shops Act. In 1957 he was expelled from the Labor Party following a divergence of opinion and became leader of the breakaway Democratic Labor Party in 1964. He was an Australian Senator for the DLP between 1965 and 1973, and then took up the appointment of Ambassador for Ireland until 1976 when he withdrew from politics. He lived locally until his death in 1980 and was always active in his constituency, supporting local institutions particularly those associated with health and children's welfare.

Following World War II, the Dutton Park and District Progress Association applied for permission to build a Memorial Hall. The Brisbane City Council did not favour this scheme and it was suggested that they lease a portion of Dutton Park instead. However, the proposal of the Dutton Park sub-branch of the RSSAILA to develop Gair Park as a Garden of Remembrance with a suitable memorial was approved. The Brisbane City Council Building and Planning Branch prepared plans in 1949. The memorial was in the form of a masonry obelisk set with bronze memorial tablets placed on a plinth of sufficient depth to accommodate the laying of wreaths. It was situated at a corner of the park, at the crest of the rise, and was approached through an avenue of shrubs and hedges. Hugh McKernan constructed the memorial, which was unveiled on Anzac Day 1951 by Lieutenant-General Sir John Lavarack, Governor of Queensland. To the members of the Dutton Park sub-branch it was a major achievement and represented the transformation of what was by then described as an unkept piece of ground into a place of beauty.

Australia, and Queensland in particular, had few civic monuments before World War I. The memorials erected in its wake became our first national monuments, recording the devastating impact of war on a young nation. Australia lost 60,000 from a population of about 4 million, representing one in five of those who served. No previous or subsequent war has made such an impact on the nation and the majority of Australian war memorials date from this era. Monumental memorials built following World War II and subsequent conflicts are less common and many comprise additions to earlier memorials or practical projects, such as public recreational facilities. As a cenotaph in a Garden of Remembrance dating from World War II, therefore, the memorial is of a less common type in Queensland. It has had memorials to previous and subsequent conflicts added to it.

The park setting has become less formal over time. In 1954 approval was given for the construction of a small concrete wall along the full length of the Annerley Road frontage with recesses for park seats and a new flowerbed in the Gladstone and Annerley Road corner. In the 1960s an avenue of eucalypts replaced earlier plantings. In 1973–74 the Multiple Sclerosis Society requested tables and chairs be provided to encourage use of the park by the inmates of the nearby convalescent home. The park now contains a picnic area and a number of shelters.

Gair Park is now used for informal outdoor recreational, cultural and educational activities. Ceremonies are held there on Anzac Day to honour war dead.

== Description ==
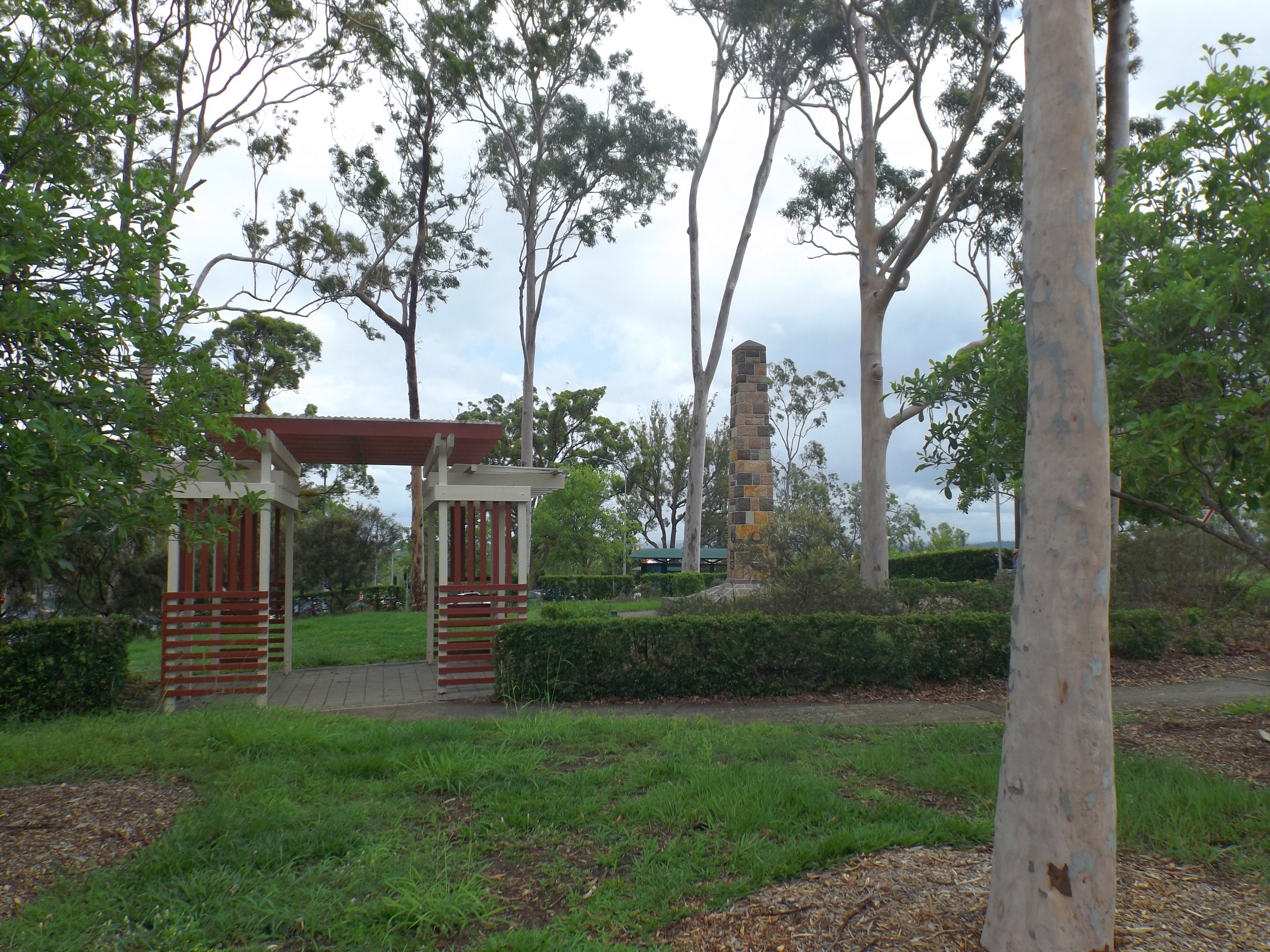
Park and memorial, 2015

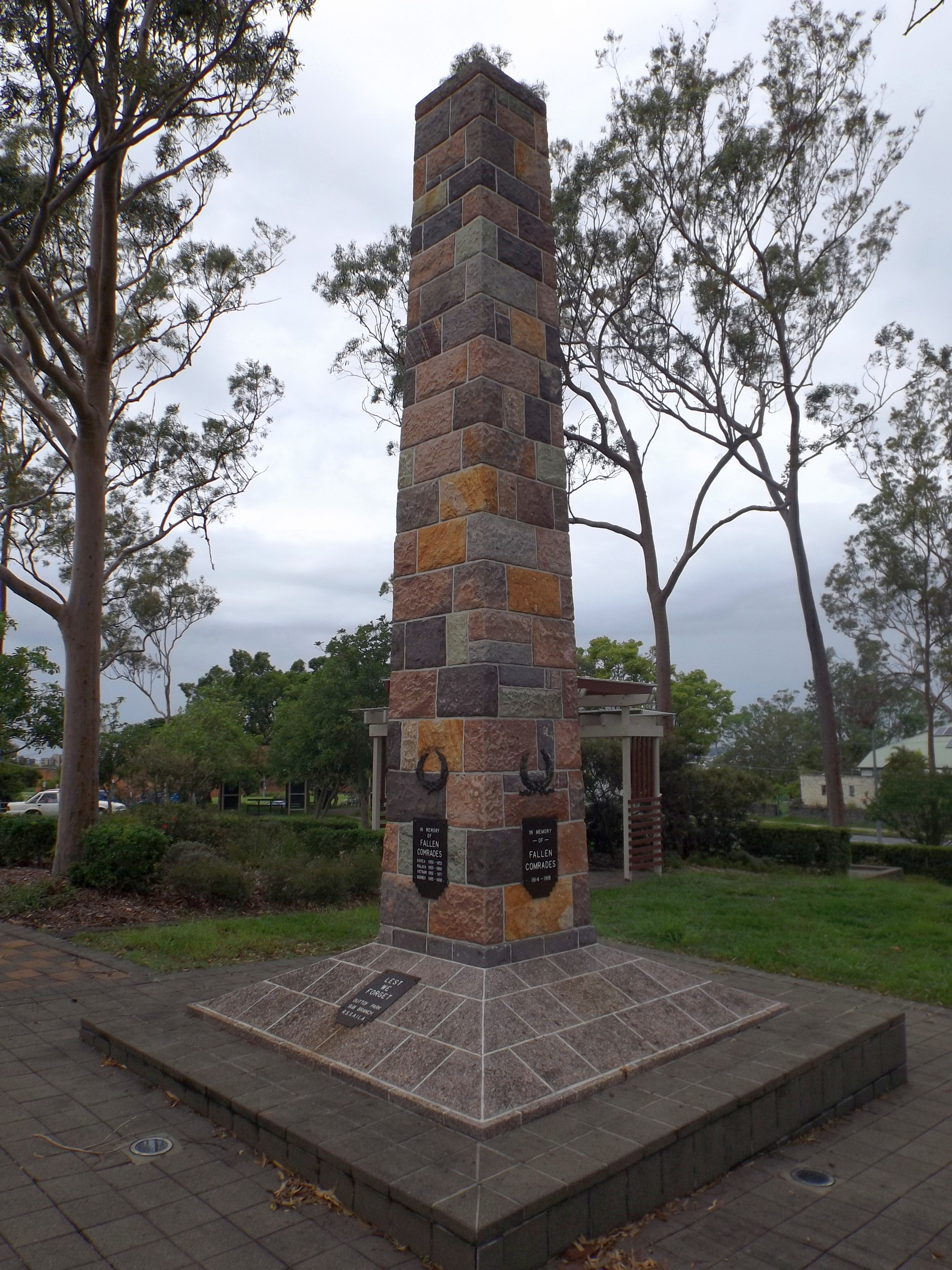
War memorial obelisk, 2015

Gair Park, a garden of remembrance containing a cenotaph, is a triangular piece of land bounded by Annerley Road, Gladstone Road and Maldon Street at Dutton Park. It is undulating in form and slopes down towards the road junction. The northeast corner has been truncated to close access to Maldon Street from Annerley Road and a side road has been cut to the south linking Gladstone Road and Annerley Road.

The memorial is situated near the western corner of the park at the top of a grassy avenue flanked by hedges and eucalypt trees. It is in the form of an obelisk, 20 feet (6.1 m) high and square in section composed of coursed blocks of Brisbane tuff (porphyry). It is set on a sloping plinth faced with masonry tiles and is surrounded by a paved area. Bronze memorial tablets beneath bronze laurel wreaths are set low on the sides of the shaft. These are inscribed "In Memory of Fallen Comrades" with the dates beneath commemorating the First and Second World Wars and the Korean, Malaya, Vietnam and Borneo conflicts. The fourth plaque commemorates the dedication of the memorial and is inscribed "Unveiled by his Excellency the Governor of Queensland Lieutenant General Sir John Laverack KBE, CB, CMG, DSO and dedicated by Reverend A G Reilly on 25 April 1951".

On the plinth are plaques inscribed "Lest We Forget. Dutton Park sub branch RSSAILA" and "Lest We Forget. Yeronga, Dutton Park RSL Branch. Merged 3.2.1964". The park also contains a number of park seats and timber shelters and scattered plantings.

== Heritage listing ==
Gair Park was listed on the Queensland Heritage Register on 5 April 2004 having satisfied the following criteria.

The place is important in demonstrating the evolution or pattern of Queensland's history.

Gair Park is a garden of remembrance and cenotaph commemorating the war dead of the Dutton Park district. Memorials that pay tribute to war dead are an important element of Queensland towns and cities and demonstrate the way in which involvement in war has helped to shape the pattern of Queensland's history. They represent a conscious expression of Australian patriotism and sense of nationhood and reflect the public taste and social attitudes of their time.

The place is important in demonstrating the principal characteristics of a particular class of cultural places.

A high proportion of war memorials in Queensland were built to commemorate World War I. Gair Park is less common in that the garden and cenotaph were constructed following World War II. After this conflict, adding to existing memorials or constructing practical memorials, such as public facilities, more commonly remembered the fallen. Gair Park is a good example of it type as a cenotaph in a formal garden of remembrance.

The place is important because of its aesthetic significance.

Gair Park is important for the aesthetic qualities of both the parkland setting and the war memorial it contains. The cenotaph is dramatically sited at the top of a grassy slope rising above Annerley Road at a major traffic intersection and is a landmark in the area.

The place has a strong or special association with a particular community or cultural group for social, cultural or spiritual reasons.

Gair Park and its memorial have a strong association with the community of Dutton Park as evidence of the impact of a major historic event on the district and also as a major project of the Dutton Park sub branch of the RSSAILA (now RSL). It is also an important ceremonial and recreational venue.

The place has a special association with the life or work of a particular person, group or organisation of importance in Queensland's history.

Gair Park is linked to the life and work of former Queensland Premier, Vincent Clair Gair (1902–1980), and its naming acknowledges his active support for the area while Member of the Legislative Assembly for South Brisbane.
