= Annerley Road =

Road in Brisbane, Australia

Annerley Road is an arterial road in Brisbane, Queensland, Australia. It was formerly known as Boggo Road due to the boggy condition of the road.

== History ==
In 2013, a cyclist was killed when riding along Annerley Road.

== Route ==
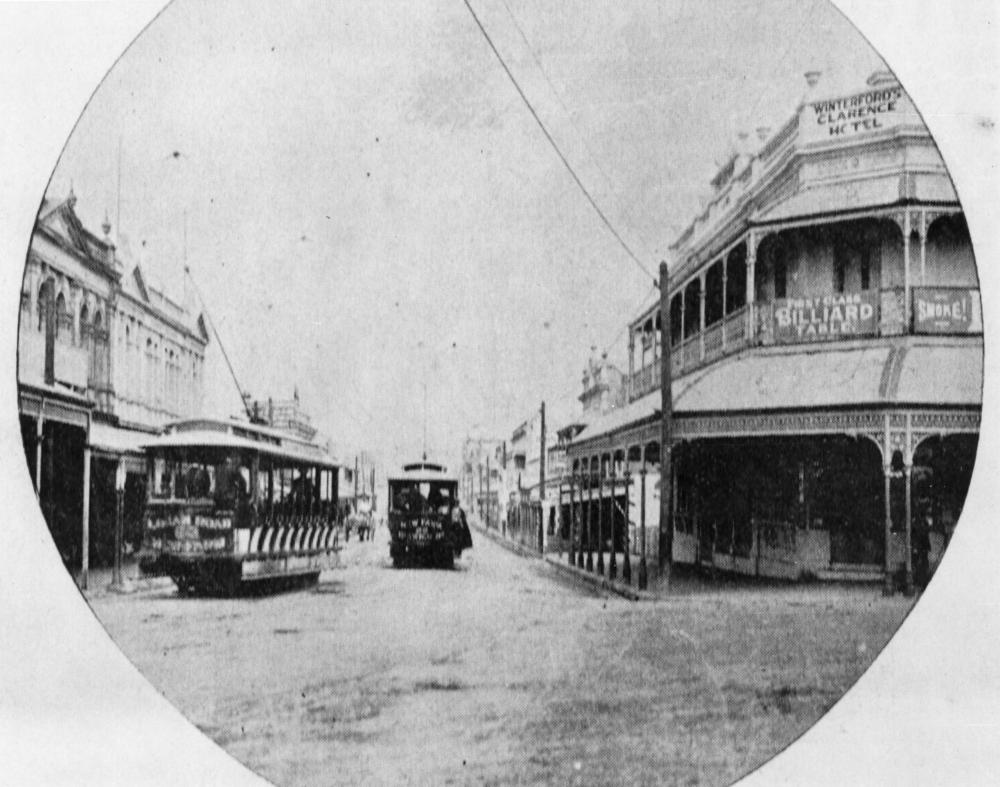
Clarence Hotel on the right, 1900

Annerley Road commences at Stanley Street at Clarence Corner. It passes through or forms the border of the suburbs of:

- South Brisbane
- Woolloongabba
- Dutton Park
- Fairfield
- Annerley

It terminates at Ipswich Road at the Annerley Junction.

== Landmarks ==
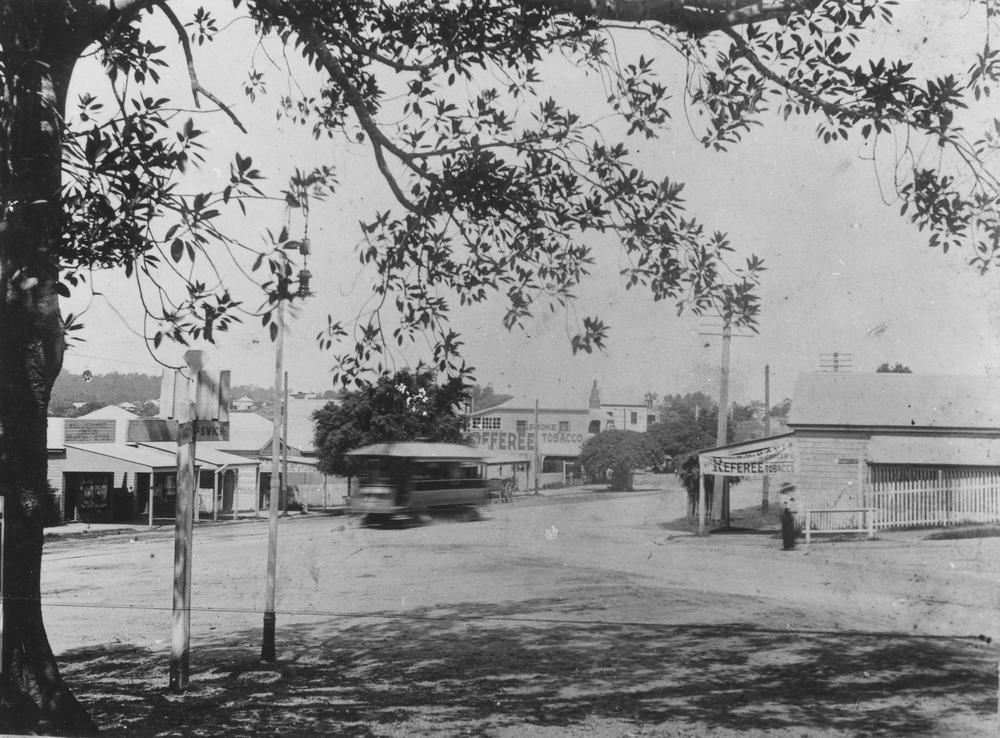
Junction of Ipswich and Annerley Roads, Annerley, ca. 1915

Annerley Road has many well-known landmarks including:

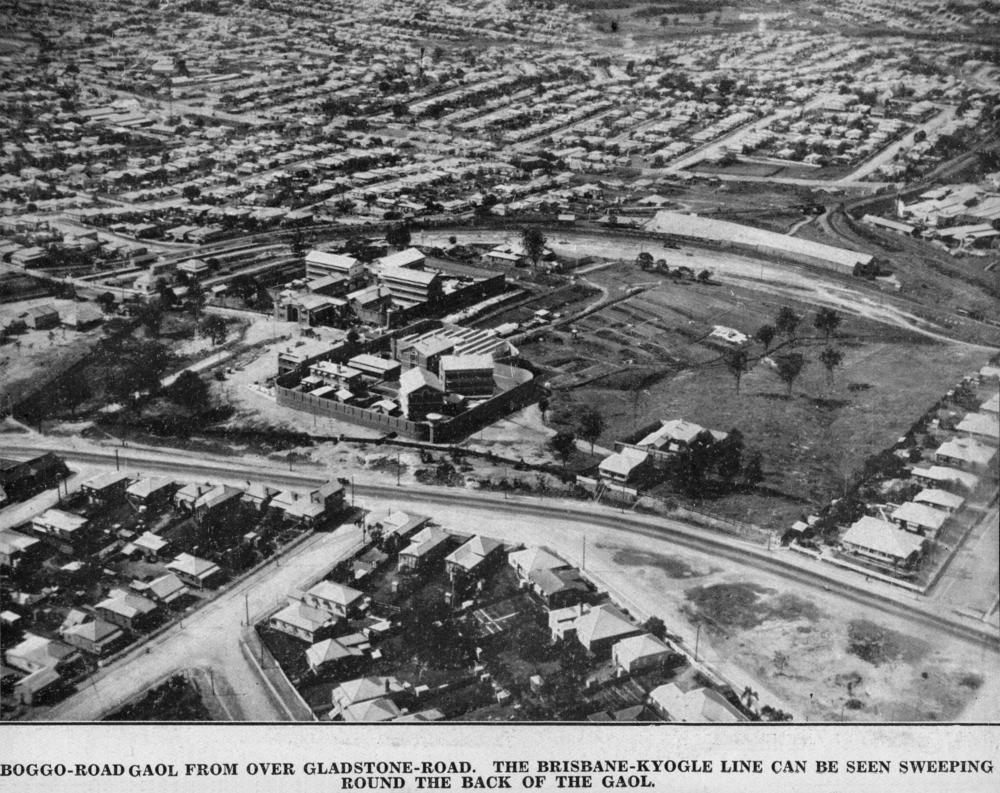
Aerial view of Boggo Road Gaol and Annerley Road, Dutton Park, 1929

- Clarence Corner (27.4855°S 153.0291°E)
- Clarence Corner Hotel, on south-east corner of Stanley Street (27.4858°S 153.0293°E)
- Princess Theatre, a heritage-listed theatre, No 8 (27.4864°S 153.0293°E)
- Mater Hospital Complex, on south-west corner of Stanley Street: (27.4868°S 153.02851°E)
- Bethany Gospel Hall, No 38 (27.4877°S 153.0290°E)
- Burke's Hotel (now Red Brick Hotel), No 83 (27.4897°S 153.0272°E)
- Dutton Park State School, No 112 (27.4935°S 153.02866°E)
- Boggo Road Gaol heritage-listed former prison, No 150 (27.4952°S 153.0287°E)
- Gair Park with the Dutton Park War Memorial, No 181 (27.4968°S 153.0272°E)
- South Brisbane Cemetery (27.4991°S 153.0271°E)
- Dutton Park railway station (27.4998°S 153.0291°E)
- Heffernan Park with its heritage-listed air raid shelter, No 260 (27.5004°S 153.0293°E)
- Ingleside, the heritage-listed residence of former Queensland Premier Digby Denham, No 391 (27.5069°S 153.0317°E)
- Annerley Junction (27.5097°S 153.0326°E)
