= Clarence Corner, Woolloongabba =

Road intersection in Brisbane, Queensland

Coordinates: 27.48553°S 153.02905°E

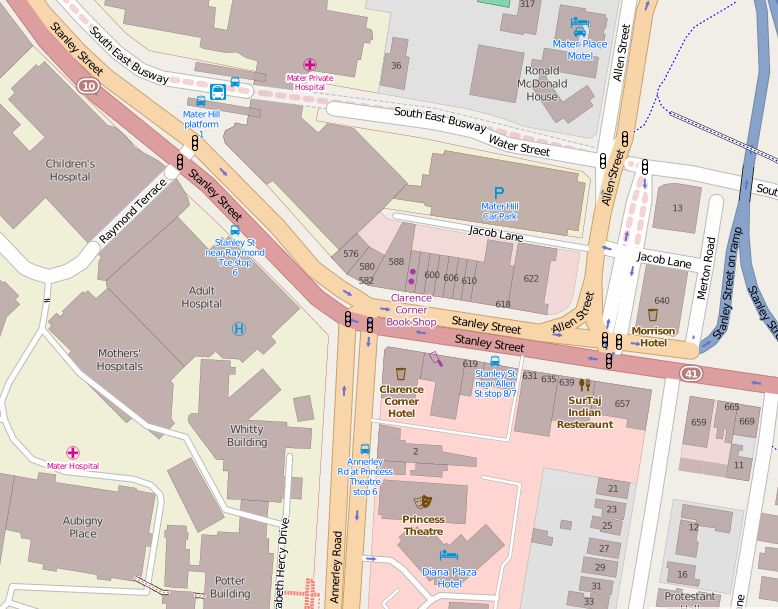
OpenStreetMap - Clarence Corner, 2014

Clarence Corner is the junction of Stanley Street and Annerley Road (formerly Boggo Road) in Woolloongabba/South Brisbane in Brisbane, Queensland, Australia. It gives its name to the local area.

== History ==
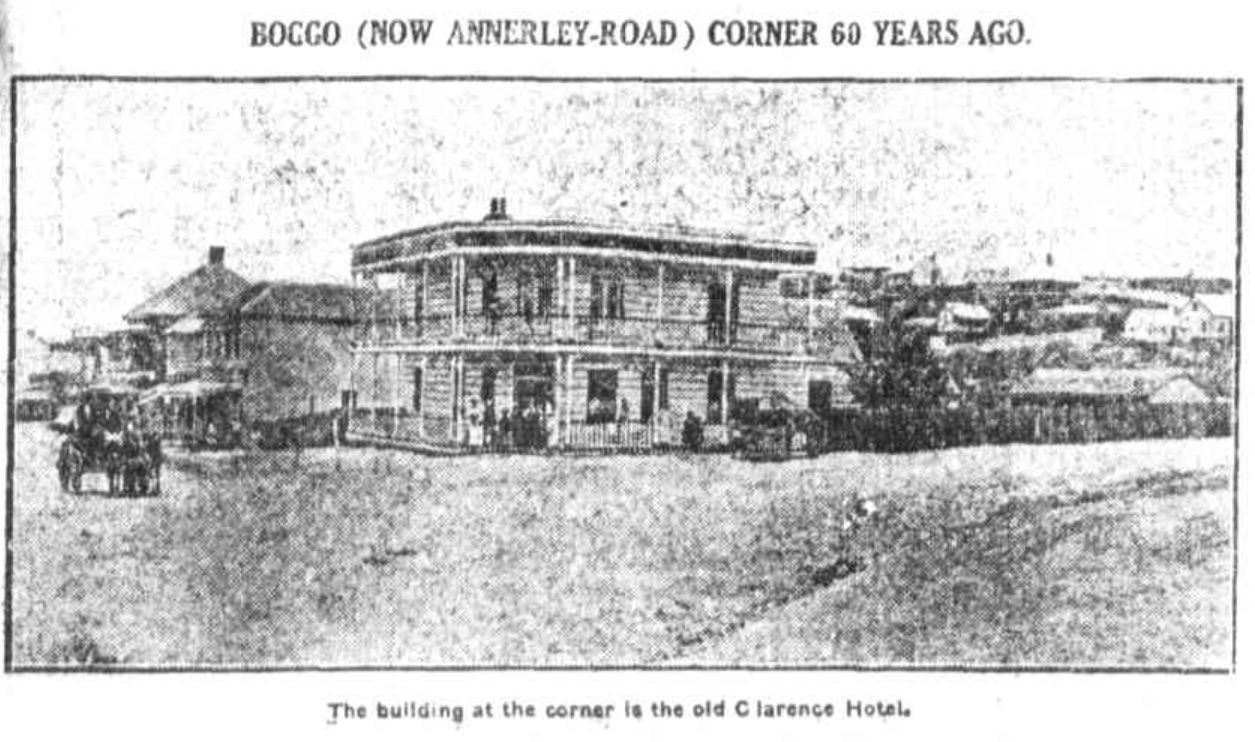
Clarence Hotel on Clarence Corner, 1864

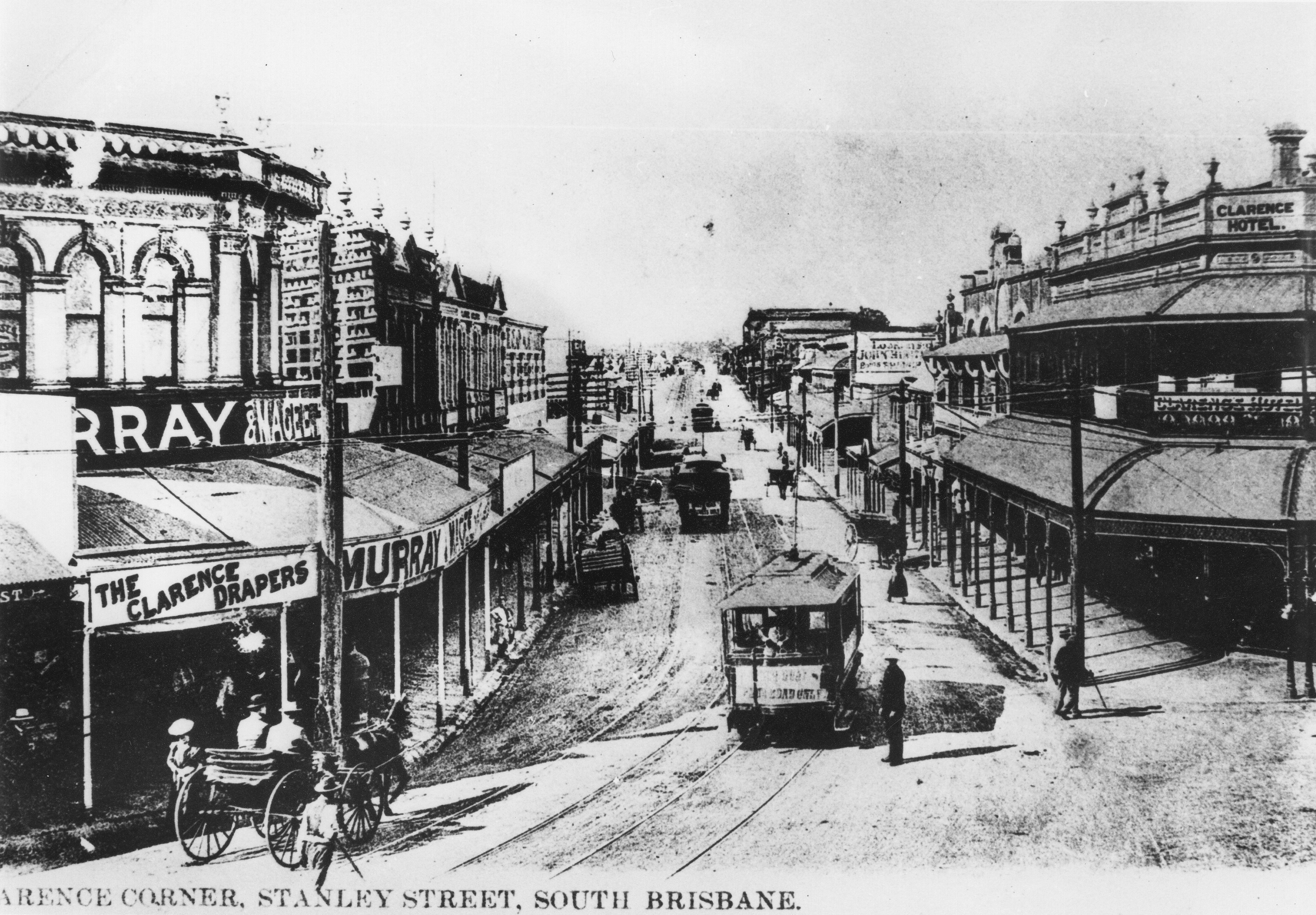
Looking east along Stanley Street from Clarence Corner with the Clarence Hotel to the right, circa 1906

The area takes its name from the Clarence Hotel that stood on the south-east corner of the intersection. The hotel was erected by builder Thomas Hayselden and the hotel obtained its licence on 8 December 1863; the reason for the choice of name is not known but may have been named after the 500-ton steamship Clarence that plied between Brisbane and Sydney at that time. After installing Richard Overland as licensee in 1864, Hayselden then went on to construct the Albion Hotel which gave its name to the suburb of Albion today. The Clarence Hotel was a popular spot with the bullock teamsters travelling along Boggo Road which was the shorter but hillier route to Ipswich.

In 1889, the Clarence Hotel was replaced by the present hotel, now known as the Clarence Corner Hotel. By that time, the area had developed as a residential and commercial district and the new hotel was built to attract that clientele. In 2014, the Clarence Corner Hotel is still in operation as a hotel, though operates now under the name 'Brisbane Brewing Co. Woolloongabba' and is listed on the Brisbane Heritage Register. However, its clientele are more likely to be drawn from the major Mater Hospital complex that now dominates the western and northern sides of Clarence Corner.
