= Newmarket State School =

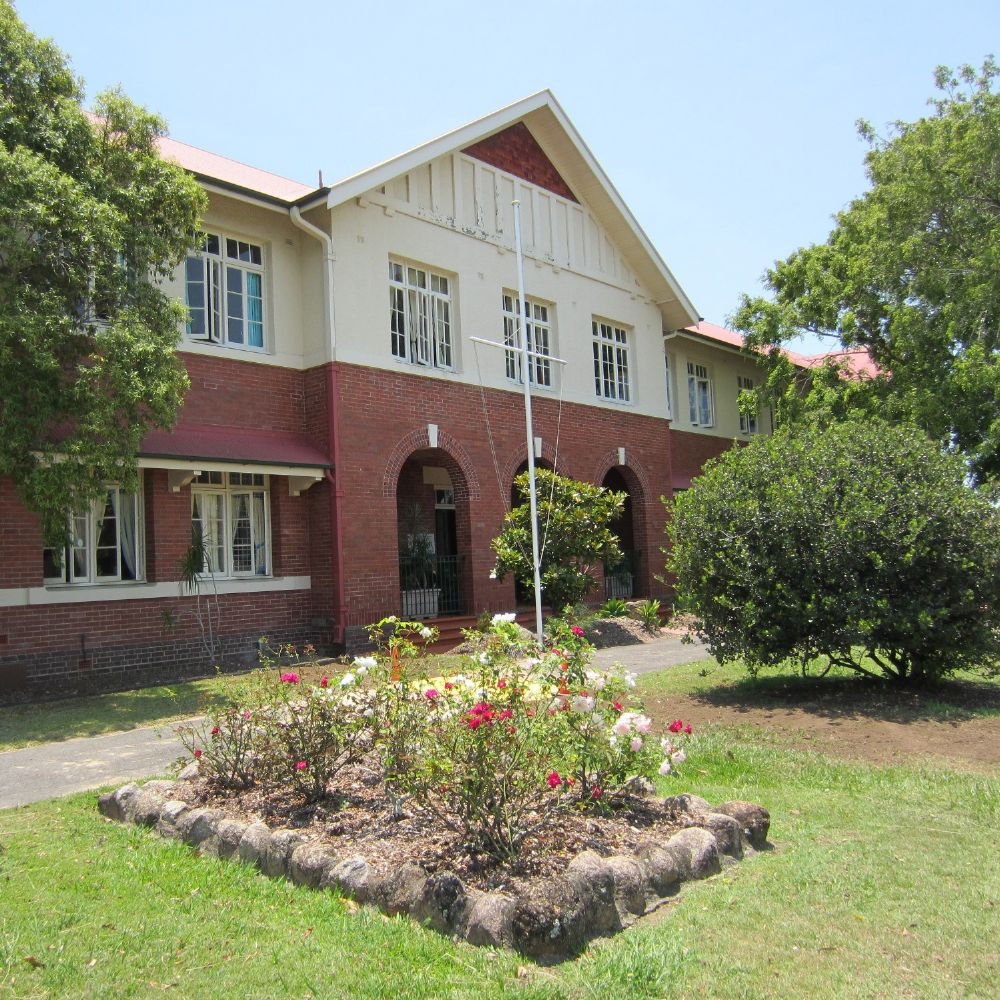
- Entrance portico to Block A, 2015

- Location within Queensland
- 27.4314°S 153.0037°E
- Location: 320 Enoggera Road, Newmarket, City of Brisbane, Queensland, Australia

History
- Design period: 1919–1930s (Interwar period)
- Built: 1910–1960, 1933–1934, 1947, 1954, 1955–1956

Site notes
- Architect(s): Queensland Department of Public Works, Boulton & Paul Ltd

Queensland Heritage Register
- Official name: Newmarket State School
- Type: state heritage
- Designated: 5 February 2016
- Reference no.: 650020
- Type: Education, research, scientific facility: School-state
- Theme: Educating Queenslanders: Providing primary schooling

Newmarket State School is a heritage-listed state school at 320 Enoggera Road, Newmarket, City of Brisbane, Queensland, Australia. It was designed by Queensland Department of Public Works and Boulton & Paul Ltd and built from 1910 to 1960. It was added to the Queensland Heritage Register on 5 February 2016.

== History ==
Newmarket State School (established 1904), located in the Brisbane suburb of Newmarket, approximately five kilometres northwest of the Brisbane central business district (CBD), is important in demonstrating the evolution of state education and its associated architecture. It retains an early Depression-era brick school building (1934, extended 1947) and a Boulton & Paul building (1954, extended 1955, 1956) set within landscaped grounds including a playing field, assembly and play areas, paths, and mature trees. The school has a strong and ongoing association with the Newmarket community.

By 1900, the Queensland Government had achieved the remarkable feat of bringing basic literacy to most Queensland children. Beginning with National schools and the introduction of the Education Act 1860, which established the Board of General Education, Queensland's national and public schools had grown from four in 1860 to 230 by 1875. Further standardisation of curriculum, training and facilities occurred when the State Education Act 1875 provided for free, compulsory and secular primary education and established the Department of Public Instruction.

The establishment of schools was considered an essential step in the development of early communities and integral to their success. Locals often donated land and labour for a school's construction and the school community contributed to maintenance and development. Schools became a community focus, a symbol of progress, and a source of pride, with enduring connections formed with past pupils, parents, and teachers. School facilities also provided a venue for a wide range of community events.

To help ensure consistency and economy, the Queensland Government developed standard plans for its school buildings. From the 1860s until the 1960s, Queensland school buildings were predominantly timber-framed, and standard designs were continually refined in response to changing needs and educational philosophy. Queensland school buildings were particularly innovative in climate control, lighting, and ventilation.

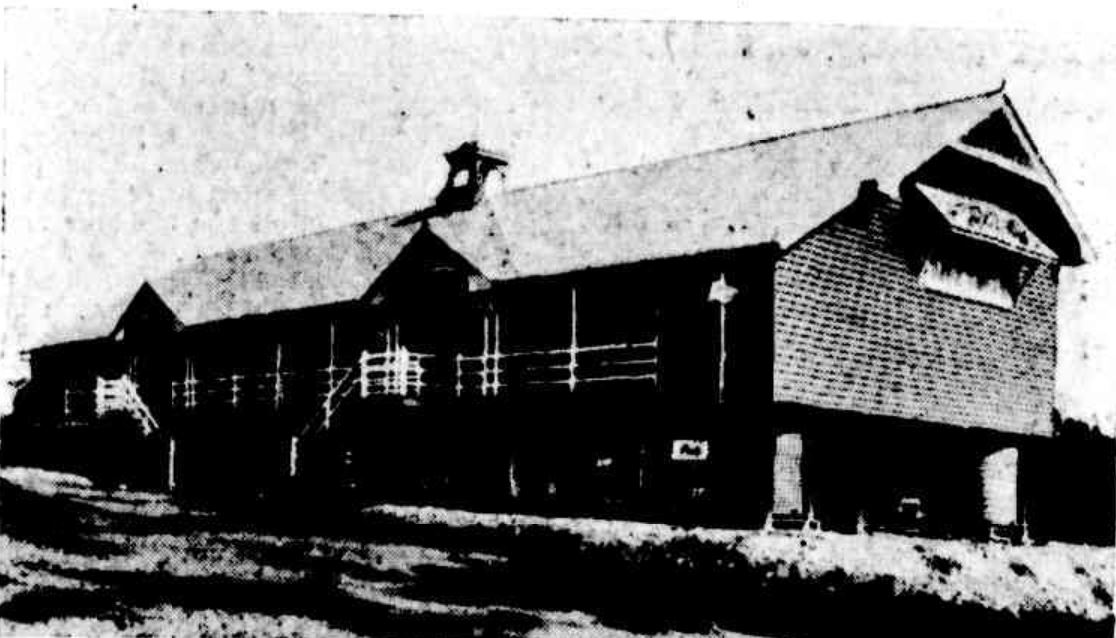
Newmarket State School, at the time of opening, July 1904

Newmarket State School opened on 4 July 1904 with 135 children enrolled, four years after its school committee had formed and 40 years after the site was reserved for school purposes. The school comprised a timber school building and a teachers residence on 9 acres (3.6 ha) on the corner of Banks Street and Enoggera Road. The occupations of the pupils' parents in the enrolment register show the rural nature of the area - timber-cutter, dairyman, farmer, grazier, drover, horse-dealer and tanner.

European settlement of Newmarket commenced when country allotments were sold as farmland in the 1860s. In 1877 the Newmarket cattle saleyards, bounded by Enoggera, Newmarket and Wilston roads and Alderson Street, commenced operations. Two years later the Newmarket Hotel opened opposite, on the (southeast) corner of Enoggera and Newmarket roads. A post office to serve the district opened in 1888. The opening of the Enoggera railway line from Mayne Junction to Enoggera in 1899, with a station at Newmarket, boosted suburban development. A police reserve of one acre was excised from the School Reserve in 1900, signalling growth of the area.

Newmarket State School continued to grow in conjunction with suburban expansion in the surrounding area and suffered serious overcrowding in the early 20th century. The Kelvin Grove tram along Enoggera Road reached Newmarket Road by 1904, promoting suburban and industrial development. Local employment was offered at sawmills and the Newmarket brickworks (1912-c. 1985). In 1911 Newmarket's population was 721 people but two years later there were 419 children enrolled at the school. Further extension of the tram line along Enoggera Road, to a terminus at Banks Street in 1926, brought it right to the school and a shopping centre developed adjacent to the tram terminus.

In 1929, the suburb of Newmarket was described by The Sunday Mail newspaper as resembling:

"a prosperous country district [with] scrub-covered spaces, large residential properties, industries, cattle saleyards, and railway [giving] it the appearance of a country township of quiet importance.... [It] comprised undulating country, gentle slopes rising from rich, high-level flats, making the district admirably suited for home-building. The breeze-swept ridges command[ed] delightful views of the outlying purple-shrouded ranges to the north and west, the picturesque Enoggera Creek flow[ed] quietly through the greater part of the district".

The population of the suburb was estimated at 4000 and attendance at the Newmarket State School was about 500 children.

The 1930s brought changes to Newmarket and its school. Further residential subdivision was promoted by the closure of the Newmarket Saleyards when they relocated to Cannon Hill in 1931.

The Great Depression, commencing in 1929 and extending well into the 1930s, caused a dramatic reduction of building work in Queensland and brought private building work to a standstill. In response, the Queensland Government provided relief work for unemployed Queenslanders and also embarked on an ambitious and important building programme using day labour and Queensland materials, to provide impetus to the economy.

Even before the October 1929 stock market crash, the Queensland Government initiated an Unemployment Relief Scheme, through a work programme by the Department of Public Works (DPW). This included painting and repairs to school buildings. By mid-1930 men were undertaking grounds improvement works to schools under the scheme. Extensive funding was given for improvements to school grounds, including fencing and levelling ground for play areas, involving terracing and retaining walls. This work created many large school ovals, which prior to this period were mostly cleared of trees but not landscaped. These play areas became a standard inclusion within Queensland state schools and a characteristic element.

The levelling and clearing of Newmarket State School's grounds was an ongoing project during the 1930s. Past students recalled that men were employed on the excavation of the Newmarket State School oval and filling the gully, under the Unemployment Relief Scheme. In 1932, three men were given two days' relief work clearing lantana and stumps from the school grounds. A concrete cricket pitch was completed in 1932, laid down entirely by voluntary labour and was subsequently available for hire to the public. Fundraising fetes and balls for the beautification of the school surroundings took place. During 1933 the School Welfare Association raised £600 for school improvements. In 1939 two new tennis courts were opened.

However, it was the decision by the Department of Public Instruction to address the inadequacies of the school and its need for additional accommodation, by erecting an entirely new building, which transformed the school. Subsequently, between 1933 and 1934 a new brick building was constructed at Newmarket State School, facing Banks Street.

In June 1932, the Forgan Smith Labor Government came to power from a campaign that advocated increased government spending to counter the effects of the Depression. The government embarked on a large public works building programme designed to promote the employment of local skilled workers, the purchase of local building materials and the production of commodious, low maintenance buildings which would be a long-term asset to the state. This building programme included: government offices, schools and colleges; university buildings; court houses and police stations; hospitals and asylums; and gaols.

Many of the programmes have had lasting beneficial effects for the citizens of Queensland, including the construction of masonry brick school buildings across the state. Most were designed in a Classical idiom as this projects the sense of stability and optimism which the government sought to convey through the architecture of its public buildings.

The construction of substantial brick school buildings in prosperous or growing suburban areas and regional centres during the 1930s provided tangible proof of the government's commitment to remedy the unemployment situation. The Department of Public Works and Department of Public Instruction were extremely enthusiastic about the Depression-era brick school buildings. They were considered monuments to progress embodying the most modern principles of the ideal education environment.

The Depression-era brick school buildings form a recognisable and important type, exhibiting many common characteristics. Frequently, they were two storeys above an open undercroft and built to accommodate up to 1000 students. They adopted a symmetrical layout and prominent central entry. The plan arrangement was similar to that of previous timber buildings being only one classroom deep, accessed by a long straight verandah or corridor. Due to their long plan forms of multiple wings, they could be built in stages if necessary; resulting in some complete designs never being realised. Ideally, the classrooms would face south with the verandah or corridor on the north side, but little concession was made for this and almost all brick school buildings faced the primary boundary road, regardless of orientation. Classrooms were commonly divided by folding timber partitions and the undercroft, where one existed, was used as covered play space, storage, ablutions and other functions.

Despite their similarities, each Depression-era brick school building was individually designed by a DPW architect, which resulted in a wide range of styles and ornamental features being utilised within the overall set. These styles, which were derived from contemporary tastes and preferences, included: Arts and Crafts, typified by half-timbered gable-ends; Spanish Mission, with round-arched openings and decorative parapets; and Neo-classical, with pilasters, columns and large triangular pediments. Over time, variations occurred in building size, aesthetic treatment, and climatic-responsive features. The Chief Architect during this period was Andrew Baxter Leven (1885–1966), who was employed by the Queensland Government Works Department from 1910 to 1951, and was Chief Architect and Quantity Surveyor from 1933 to 1951. The DPW architect involved in the design of Newmarket State School was Arthur J Moase.

Constructed in three stages, it was intended that the first section of the Newmarket State School's new brick building would be the nucleus of a building scheme to accommodate 1038 pupils. The complete scheme was to be:

"of brick construction, two storeys in height, having an overall length of about 288ft [87.78 m], including the attached lavatory blocks at each end. The footings will be of concrete, the walls to the height of mould sill course will be faced brick, above which the brickwork will be rough-cast externally. Floors of porches, corridors and lavatory blocks will be of concrete and also the entrance steps and staircases. The floors of classrooms are to be sheeted with crow's ash. The main roof and roofs of sunshades will be covered with galvanised corrugated iron, and the ceilings of all classrooms finished in fibro-cement. The dividing walls of classrooms etc will be of brick with the exception of those to four classrooms on each floor, where they will be wooden folding partitions to enable these rooms to be thrown into one room for assembly purposes. All walls internally will be finished in cement plaster. The front elevation is neatly relieved by projecting gables panelled in fibro-cement, and wide overhanding eaves and sunshades added to the appearance, while also the long roof is broken by a large octagonal fleche."

"The ground floor will have ... classrooms ... [and] two teachers' rooms ... while the remainder of the floor space is taken up by hatrooms, corridors, lavatories, etc. The upper floor will contain ... classrooms ... one teachers room ... also corridors etc, corresponding with those on the ground floor."

Only the central and eastern portions of the overall plan for Newmarket State School's brick building were completed in 1934, and the scheme was never completed in its entirety. Keyed brickwork on the external walls indicated locations where the building was planned to be extended at a later date (still visible on the northern elevation). This situation was not uncommon, and occurred with other public buildings designed to be constructed in stages. Some examples are the University of Queensland Mayne Medical School), the State Government Offices, Townsville and the Depression-era brick school building at Ipswich North State School.

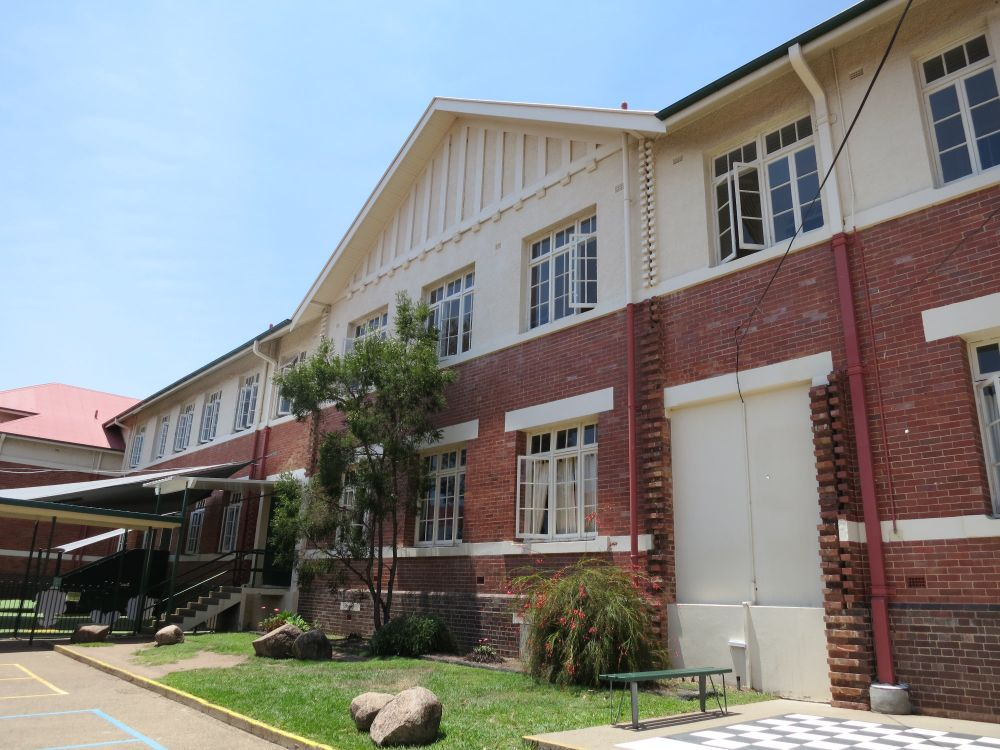
Rear view of Block A, 2015

Newmarket State School's new brick school building (now called Block A) was opened on 30 June 1934 by the Minister for Public Instruction (Frank Cooper). It was a two-storey masonry building, constructed from red brick with a darker brick base and pale stucco treatment to the upper floor. It had a hipped roof with gables over the entrances and a prominent ventilation fleche. The main entrance was through a portico with three round arches. Gables featured a half-timbered ornamental effect, utilising timber, fibre-cement panels and terracotta tiles. The building contained 13 classrooms, a head teacher's office, and retiring rooms on both floors. Circulation was provided by an internal staircase at the eastern end and an external timber staircase attached to the western wall. Windows on the southern elevation were protected by terra-cotta tile-clad window hoods. Landscaping in front of the new building including a row of fig trees along the Banks Street fence line (two of which survive), and the laying out of pathways.

Externally, Block A adopted an Arts and Crafts-style decorative treatment, reminiscent of early 20th century brick schools such as Ascot State School (1920), Windsor State School (1915) and Wooloowin State School (1914), giving it a domestic quality quite different to the more imposing Neo-Classical style brick schools from the Depression-era. With its half-timbered gables, round arches to the entrance portico, and lack of undercroft play space, Newmarket State School is most similar in plan and style to Mackay Intermediate School (now Mackay Central State School), also completed in 1934.

In 1936, the 1904 timber school building was relocated on the site, nearer to the police reserve and perpendicular to Enoggera Road. A donation of £50 was made by a local resident for the building to be re-erected as an up-to-date hall suitable for school functions. It was handed over to the school committee for this purpose in July 1937. After the former school building site was cleared of its entrance pathway and ornamental trees to build tennis courts, a row of mature trees along the southern edge of the Police Reserve, including fig trees, became the only surviving remnant of the original school planting scheme.

World War II contingencies had similar impacts upon Newmarket State School as on other Brisbane schools, but during that period the school gained improvements to its facilities. School tennis courts were opened in 1941 by the Minister for Public Instruction, Harry Bruce, and in 1944–1945 a playshed was erected at a cost of £484, as Block A had no undercroft for this purpose. In August 1945, the George Taylor Memorial Library was housed at Newmarket State School and opened by Keith Morris, MLA.

The post-World War II period was a time of enormous population growth Australia-wide and was accompanied by a shortage of building materials. The Department of Public Instruction was largely unprepared for the enormous demand for state education for the "baby boom" that began in the late 1940s and continued well into the 1960s. Queensland schools were overcrowded and, to cope, many new buildings were constructed and existing buildings were extended.

After World War II the overriding concern for the Department of Public Instruction was the need to build school buildings as expeditiously and economically as possible. Queensland schools were faced with enormous overcrowding and a lack of resources. However, the Queensland Government and community saw education as a low priority and provided the department with only a small budget.

At Newmarket State School, additional classrooms were required to accommodate the growth in pupil numbers: 728 in 1954; 837 in 1956; rising to its peak of 919 pupils in 1958. Although other brick Depression-era buildings were built in stages and completed as many as 10 years later, this did not occur at Newmarket State School, despite its accommodation needs in the post-World War II period. Extension of brick buildings was made difficult by material shortages, and by the 1950s Newmarket State School had already experienced this situation. In September 1945 the addition of a toilet block to the eastern end of Newmarket's Depression-era brick school building had been authorised and an order placed for common and face bricks, but these had not been supplied ten months later. The toilet block was finally constructed in 1947.

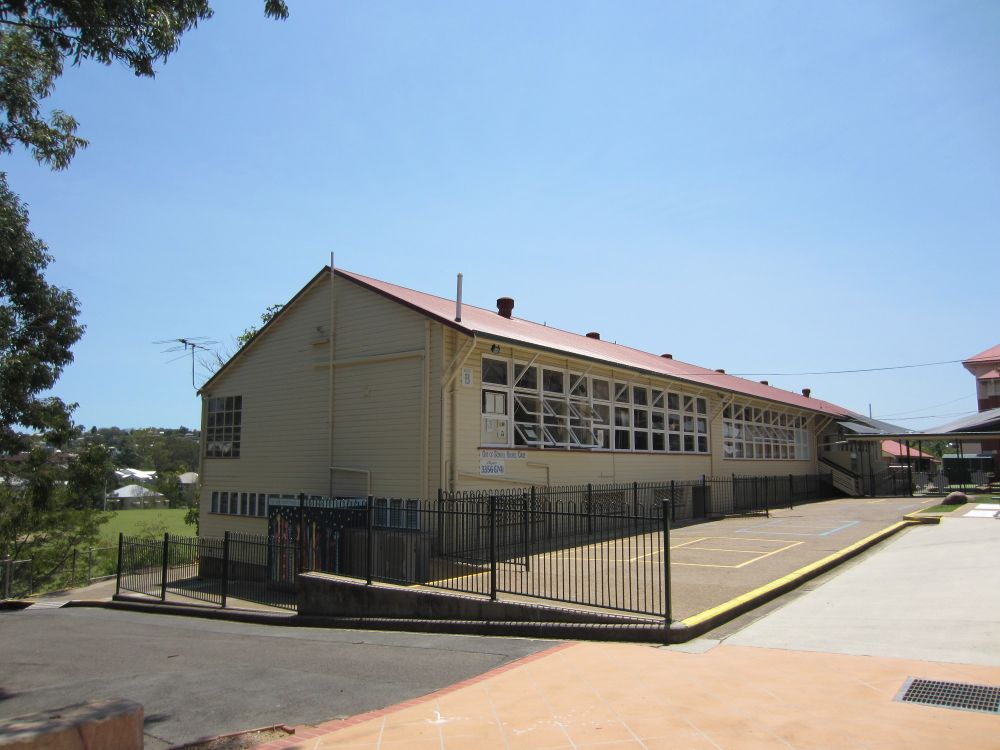
Block B from the south-west, 2015

Instead, in 1954 a timber Boulton & Paul Building was constructed, comprising two classrooms (now called Block B). Responding to materials shortages and the pressures of the baby boom, the Department of Public Works imported a British prefabricated building system from manufacturers Boulton & Paul Ltd of Norwich. Based on an 8-foot (2.4 m) planning and construction module, the prefabricated elements in the Boulton & Paul system included wall panels, ceiling panels, roof trusses and banks of awning windows. The buildings were constructed at many schools across Queensland between 1952 and 1958. Boulton & Paul buildings were timber-framed and clad, had a verandah as circulation, and a gable roof. Ideally, they were orientated so the verandah faced north and the classroom faced south but were also added as extensions to existing buildings regardless of orientation. The building could be high or low-set and had extensive areas of timber framed awning windows, providing more glazing than had ever been used in Queensland classrooms; almost the entirety of the verandah wall and the opposite classroom wall were glazed, providing excellent natural ventilation and lighting. The classrooms were 24 by 24 feet (7.3 m × 7.3 m), larger than most previous classrooms. The flexibility of the system meant that the number of classrooms constructed could vary to suit the needs of a particular school. In some cases, Boulton & Paul classrooms were used to form long, interconnected blocks, such as at Geebung State School (1951–55), Dalby State High School (1954) and Indooroopilly State High School (1953–54).

The Boulton & Paul building at Newmarket State School was located to the north of the Block A, aligned parallel to it and overlooking the playing field. The access stairs and verandah, which had glazed screen walls at either end, were on the north side of the building, and a retaining wall was constructed along the southern side of the partially-enclosed understorey. The walls were constructed from prefabricated units, 4 feet (1.2 m) wide, with those on the north and south sides containing large areas of windows. Units were pre-clad with chamferboards, with the edge of vertical timber boards between each unit visible on the exterior. On the interior, walls and ceilings were lined with flat sheeting.

As the school population continued to rise, more classrooms were required. Extensions to the Boulton & Paul Building were made in 1955 with two classrooms added to its western side. This extension was designed by the Department of Public Works to match the Boulton & Paul section, and illustrates the influence that the Boulton & Paul buildings had upon subsequent school building designs. Immediately after their introduction, DPW developed a standard building which was similar to the Boulton & Paul building but was constructed in the traditional manner. This type adopted many of the Boulton & Paul design features, such as a covered play space under the classrooms and the extensive areas of glazing, but became permanent structures. These architectural features became characteristic of a class of building which was the dominant school type constructed in the 1950s.

The 1955 extension utilised the same plan, dimensions and construction module as the Boulton & Paul section, however it is unclear if any pre-fabricated components were also used. As the walls were not constructed from pre-clad units the external chamferboard cladding had a more traditional appearance. The glazed screen wall at the western end of the Boulton & Paul verandah was relocated to the end of the extension and a doorway was inserted to link the adjoining classrooms of the two sections. Seating was provided in the understorey, which was partially enclosed by walls with areas of louvres. The retaining wall along the south side of the block was extended and a set of concrete steps linked the understorey to the playground behind.

In 1956 the building was extended again, on the eastern side of the Boulton & Paul building. It comprised two classrooms, a teachers room, store room, and a passageway linking the north verandah to the playground on the southern side. This extension also matched the design and dimensions of the earlier sections. Major changes were made to the understorey at this time, including the construction of brick toilet blocks at each end and a small store room, and the relocation of seating. The ground around the block was concreted and new sets of steps constructed between the different playground levels and to the rear of Block A.

In spite of these new additions, further space was required, and in 1956 the playshed was enclosed and converted for use as classrooms. A tuckshop was constructed beneath the Boulton & Paul Building in the 1950s.

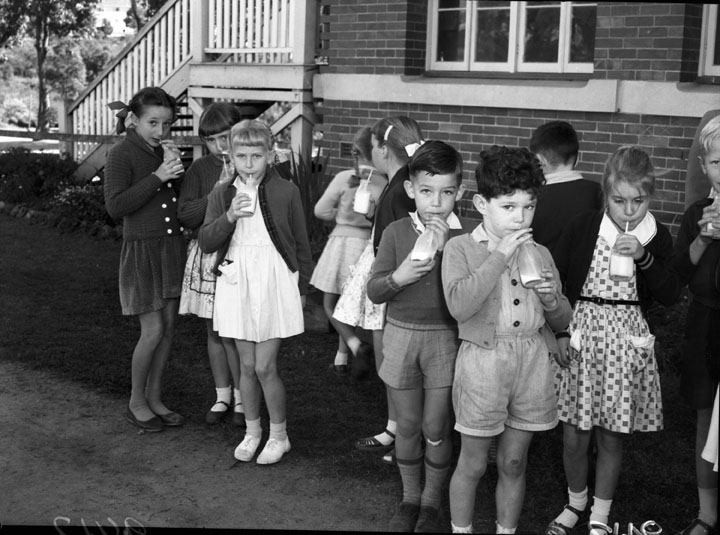
Free school milk distribution at the school, July 1958

Over the course of the school's history, buildings have been added and removed to meet the school's requirements. In 1958, temporary classrooms were moved to Newmarket State School from Junction Park State School and located near the teachers residence on Banks Street. Also in 1958, the 1904 timber school building, which had been used as a hall for over 30 years, was sold for removal. After the establishment of the Newmarket State High School in 1963, adjacent to and west of the State School in Banks Street, the temporary classrooms from Junction Park State School were used by the high school and removed after that school's closure in 1996. In 1977 the teachers residence was demolished. The c. 1945 playshed, next to the tennis courts, was demolished between 1987 and 1992. A recent shelter shed now occupies its former location. Changes to Block A include the removal of the roof fleche between 1961 and 1969, and the addition of a brick stairwell to the western end in 1974, replacing external timber stairs. In the 1990s, wrought iron gates, believed to have come from the Queensland Trustee's Building in Queen Street, were recovered from the grounds, cleaned and erected in the main entrance portico. This followed requests in 1936 and 1940 from the school to Department of Public Instruction for assistance to erect pillars at the school's entrance from which to hang the gates. Alterations to the interior include the removal of all but one set of timber folding partitions, and the insertion of new partitions to some classrooms and office areas. Former hat rooms have been enclosed to form office or storage space, and some ground floor ceilings have been relined.

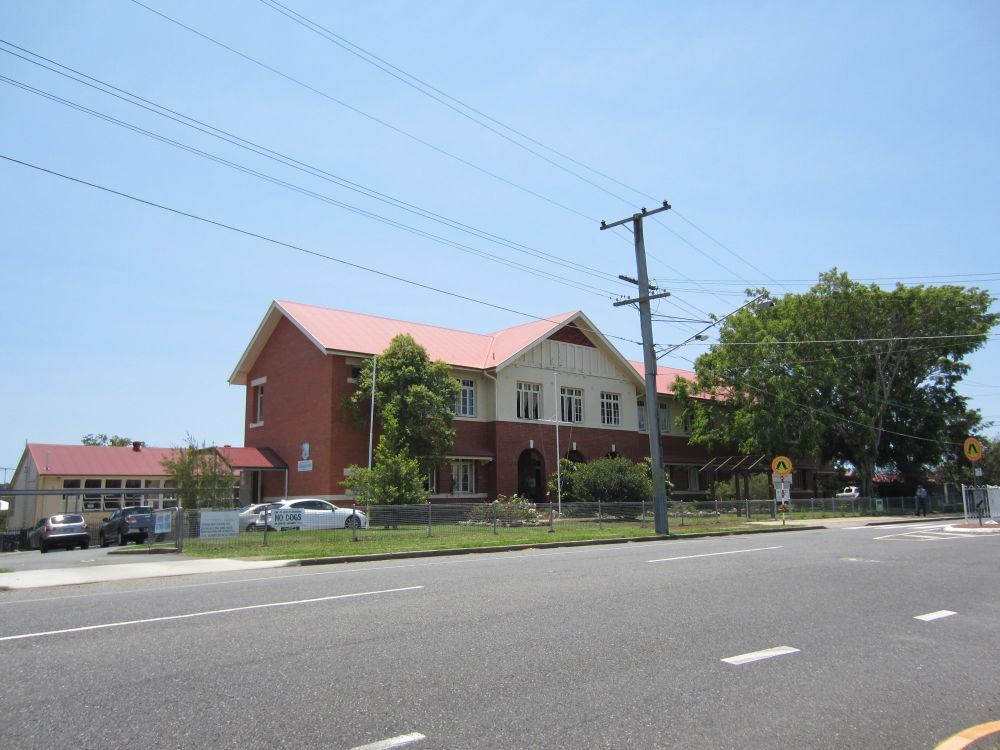
View of the school from Banks Street with Block B (left) and Block A (right), 2015

Block B has had some alterations over the years, however the central (Boulton & Paul) and western (DPW) sections remain fairly intact, apart from the enclosure of the western verandah end and modification to some internal partitions. Having undergone a series of renovations since 1999, the interior of the eastern (DPW) section has been heavily modified and is not considered to be of heritage significance. The understory has had further enclosures constructed along the southern edge.

Changes to the school grounds have also occurred since WWII. These included the construction of stairs to the oval (the current concrete stairs date from the 1960s, replacing an earlier set). Additions made to the Newmarket School Reserve when it increased to 8 acres (3.2 ha) 13.1 perches (330 m^{2}) in 1963–4 included the extension of the playing field to its west, as part of works relating to the opening of the Newmarket State High school. Much of the bank excavated during the 1930s along the southern edge of the oval was removed or altered at this time. New tennis courts and a shelter shed were completed between 2002 and 2004. More recent buildings added to the school grounds are located along the Banks Street boundary and around former netball courts in the southeast corner. In the area in front of Block A's entrance portico garden beds have been created, early paths have been paved or laid with bitumen, and several memorials have been established.

Anniversary celebrations have been held by the school to mark its milestones. In 1954 for the school's 50th anniversary the first school principal conducted a roll call of foundation students; a fancy dress ball for students was held with an attendance of nearly 1000 children and 500 adults; and a greeting card featuring an illustration of the school by H Williams was produced. The 75th anniversary celebrations in 1979 involved publication of a school history, a recreated 1904 classroom and a festive event opened by the Governor of Queensland, Sir James Ramsay. 90th anniversary celebrations were held in 1994. For the school's centenary in 2004, a comprehensive school history was published. Recently painted murals depicting Block A are located within the school grounds (beneath Block B) and on a bus shelter on the corner of Enoggera Road and Banks Street (the former Newmarket Air Raid Shelter).

In 2015, the Newmarket State School continues to operate from its original site. It retains its 1934 Depression-era brick school building and its 1954 Boulton & Paul Building with DPW extensions, set in landscaped grounds with tennis courts, playing field and mature shade trees. The school is important to the area as a focus for the community, and generations of students have been taught there. Since establishment, Newmarket State School has been a key social focus for its community with the grounds and buildings having been the location of many social events.

== Description ==
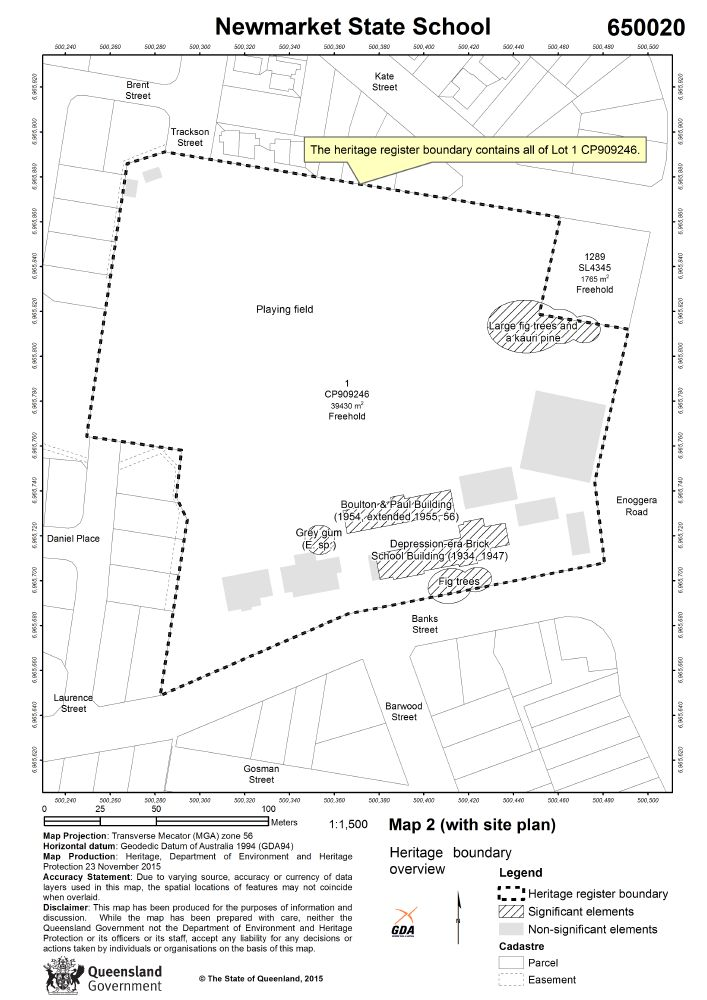
Site map, 2015

Newmarket State School occupies a 3.9-hectare (9.6-acre) site on the corner of Enoggera Road and Banks Street in the suburb of Newmarket, five kilometres northwest of the Brisbane CBD. The school buildings are located along the southern boundary, parallel to Banks Street, at the highest point of the school grounds, which slope down from Banks Street towards the north. A steep, rocky bank separates the school buildings from a playing field, which occupies the northwest portion of the grounds. The site is bounded by residential properties to the west and north, with a small section of the northern boundary adjacent to Kate Street and an entrance from Trackson Street. A former police reserve and house occupies the corner of Enoggera Road and Kate Street (now a private residence). The most prominent building on the site is a Depression-era brick school building (Block A, 1934, extended 1947) which fronts Banks Street. Behind Block A is a block of 1950s timber classrooms (Block B, 1954, 55, 56), of which the central pair are an imported Boulton & Paul building. The school grounds contain a number of significant mature trees, and landscaping features include earthworks, assembly and play areas, sporting facilities, and paths.

=== Depression-era brick school building (Block A) ===
The Depression-era brick school building is a long, two-storey building, orientated east–west and set back from Banks Street, fronted by pathways, gardens and mature trees. Asymmetrical in plan, the main entrance is located at the western end of the building, occupying a gable-roofed projecting bay. A classroom wing extends to the east with a secondary entrance in a projecting bay at the end, and a two-storey 1940s toilet block extension forms the far eastern end of the block. West of the main entrance, the original building extends the width of one classroom, with a 1970s stairwell forming the western end.

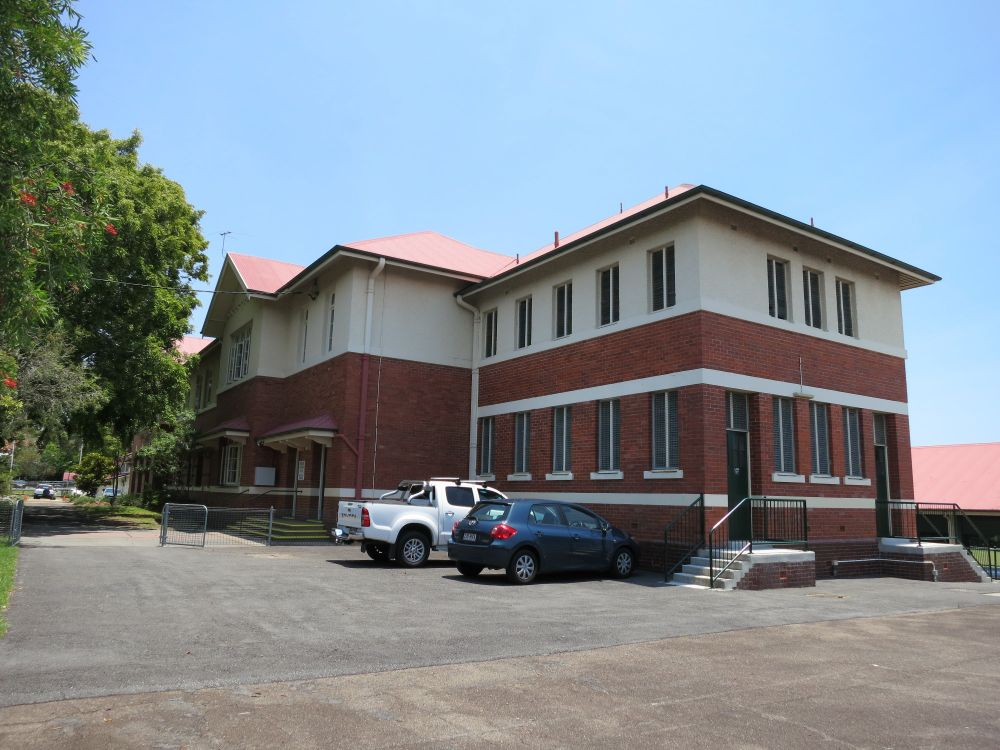
1947 toilet block extension to Block A, 2015

Ornamented with an Arts and Crafts-style decorative treatment, the building is constructed from red face brick walls at ground level, which extend up to window sill height on the first floor. Above this, the walls are rendered in stucco. The base of the building is a plinth of darker brick capped with sloped brick coping. The gabled main entrance comprises an arcaded portico with three, semi-circular arched openings. The central opening is enclosed by a pair of wrought iron gates. Above the first floor windows, the main entrance gable is ornamented with horizontal and vertical pieces of timber to create a half-timbered effect, with a triangular section of terra cotta tiles at the peak. This half-timbering effect is repeated on the three other gables of the 1934 section. A horizontal band of render wraps around the building at ground floor window sill height. Render is also used to highlight the keystones of the three arched entrances of the front portico and lintels of ground floor doors and windows. The hipped and gabled roof is clad in corrugated metal sheeting, and the raked eaves are lined with timber.

On the northern (rear) elevation, sections of keyed brickwork and a filled-in doorway indicate the location of planned extensions which never occurred. An original entrance door, accessed by concrete steps, is located at the eastern end of the classroom wing. A second entrance has been created from a previously filled-in doorway.

Windows openings are regularly spaced and contain sets of timber, three-light casement windows with rectangular, three-light fanlights above. Ground floor windows on the southern elevation are sheltered by timber-framed hoods with hipped, corrugated metal-clad roofs and supported by solid timber brackets. Hoods are also located over one window and the original doorway on the north elevation. Original timber entrance doors are generally high-waisted with timber ornamentation and panes of obscure glass in the upper section, with the exception of the main entrance double door, which has a larger area of glazing.

The hip-roofed 1947 toilet block extension is constructed from matching bricks and is a similar (though plainer) style to the original building. It has two entrances in the eastern wall, accessed by concrete steps, with high-waisted, timber board doors with four-light windows of obscure glass. It has tall windows openings fitted with glass louvres, which are divided by a central mullion.

The brick stairwell extension (1974) at the western end of the building is constructed from a different type of brick (of a brighter shade of red). While it does contain some early, relocated timber entrance doors, this stairwell is not of cultural heritage significance.

Internally, rooms are arranged along the southern side of the building, linked by a single long corridor on each floor. Two rooms are located on the north side of the corridors at the eastern end. A hall leads from the main entrance to the corridor and an original stairwell is located in the southeast corner. The ground floor contains six classrooms, two teachers rooms (on either side of the entrance hall) and a former hat room. The first floor contains seven classrooms, a teachers room and two former hat rooms. Several classrooms have been converted for use as office space and staff rooms, and the hat rooms enclosed for storage space. The 1934 stairwell has concrete stairs, metal balustrades with timber posts and top rails, and original timber doors.

Internal walls are generally plaster-lined with simple skirtings, and classrooms retain timber picture rails. One set of original timber folding doors survives between two classrooms on the ground floor. The location of removed folding partitions is indicated by surviving bulkheads in other classrooms. Original ceilings are lined with flat sheeting and ornamented by timber battens forming a grid pattern. Square ventilation panels survive in first floor classroom ceilings but are now enclosed. Original timber double-hung windows and double doors with large, three-light fanlights remain in the internal corridor walls. An early school bell is fixed to a bulkhead in the ground floor corridor, and an honour board and memorabilia from the former Newmarket High School are displayed next to the 1934 stairwell.

The 1947 toilet block is accessed from the eastern end of the corridors. Each level has girls, boys and teachers toilets, in generously sized rooms with high ceilings. Walls are plaster lined and ceilings have timber battens. Most original timber partitions and doors are retained.

=== Boulton & Paul Building (Block B) ===
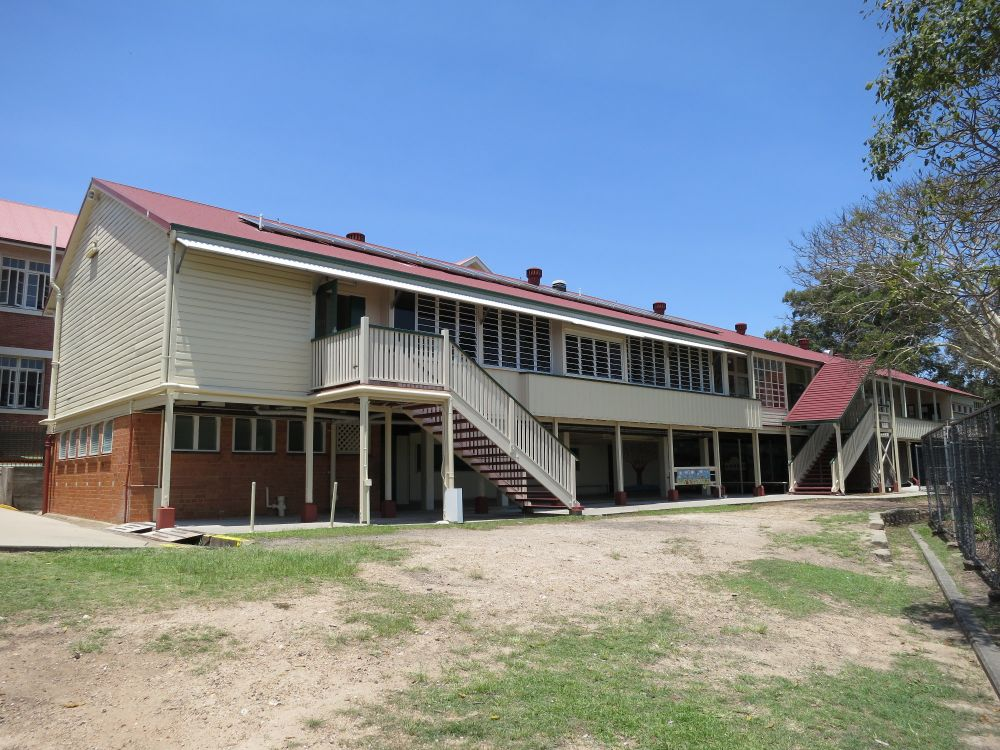
Block B from the north, 2015

Block B is a long, highset, timber-framed building with a gable roof clad in corrugated metal sheeting. It comprises: a 1954 Boulton & Paul (B&P) section in the centre (two classrooms); a 1955 DPW-designed section at the western end (two classrooms), and a 1956 DPW-designed section at the eastern end (two classrooms, passageway, teachers room and store room). Orientated east-west, the building has a verandah along the northern side, accessed by three sets of timber stairs (one to each section).

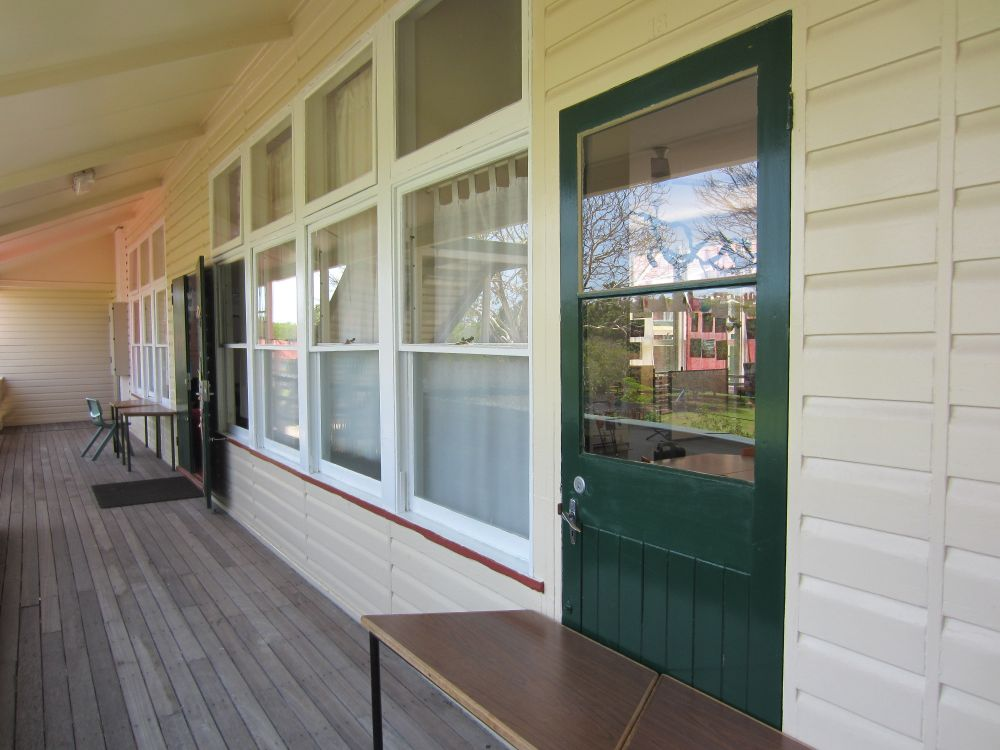
Verandah, Block B, 2015

The exterior is clad in timber chamferboards. The B&P section is clearly distinguishable from the DPW sections by the breaking up of the external cladding by the edges of vertical timber boards between each panel of the prefabricated wall units. Large areas of windows line the southern wall of each section - timber awning windows to the B&P section and western DPW section; replacement aluminium double-hung sash windows with timber awning windows above to the eastern DPW section. Angled timber brackets support the roof overhang and the eaves are unlined. The end walls of the classroom level are windowless.

The verandah has timber floors and large sections of bag rack balustrades. Part of the western end of the verandah is enclosed with chamferboard-clad walls, while the full extent of the verandah to the eastern DPW section is enclosed by chamferboards and areas of louvres above bag racks. Sections of early, horizontal timber rail balustrades survive in places, including to the western and central stairs. Original timber screens with square glass panes from the B&P section survive: two panels relocated to the far western end of the verandah, and one panel at the eastern end of the B&P section. The verandah ceilings are raked and lined with flat sheeting, with bulkheads between the B&P and DPW sections. The B&P section has exposed rafters aligned with joins in the wall panels. Verandah windows are timber-framed, double-hung windows with awning windows above. Surviving verandah doors include: half-glazed, timber double doors to the western DPW section and passageway of the eastern DPW section; and a half-glazed, single timber door to the B&P section.

The interior of the B&P section is lined with panels of flat sheeting, without cover strips, on the walls and ceiling. Vertical members of the structural system are evident on the north and south walls, between pairs of windows. The dividing partition has been removed to form one large classroom, with its location evident in the ceiling lining. Non-significant interior elements include added partitions, modern cupboards and floor linings, and the kitchen fit-out.

The interior of the western DPW section is similar to the B&P section, but without the expressed wall structure on the north and south walls. A large opening has been created between the two former classrooms, and the door to the enclosed section of the verandah has been removed.

The interior of the eastern DPW section is not of heritage significance, due to substantial alterations to the building fabric, including the re-lining of all walls and ceilings and the creation of new doorways and large openings.

The understorey has a concrete floor, brick toilet blocks at each end, and an exposed, unpainted ceiling revealing the floor structure of the classrooms above. The building is supported on a variety of stumps, including round metal posts, square concrete piers and timber posts to the verandahs. Some early seating remains within the space. A concrete retaining wall runs alongside the building, adjacent to southern side of the block, and a set of concrete steps provides access to the concrete playground to the south. A ramp added to the southern side of the eastern DPW section is not of heritage significance.

The southern side of the understory has been enclosed to create storage space. An early, chamferboard-clad timber partition remains between the B&P and western DPW sections. A large mural, which includes a depiction of Block A, is painted along the northern wall of the enclosures.

=== Grounds ===
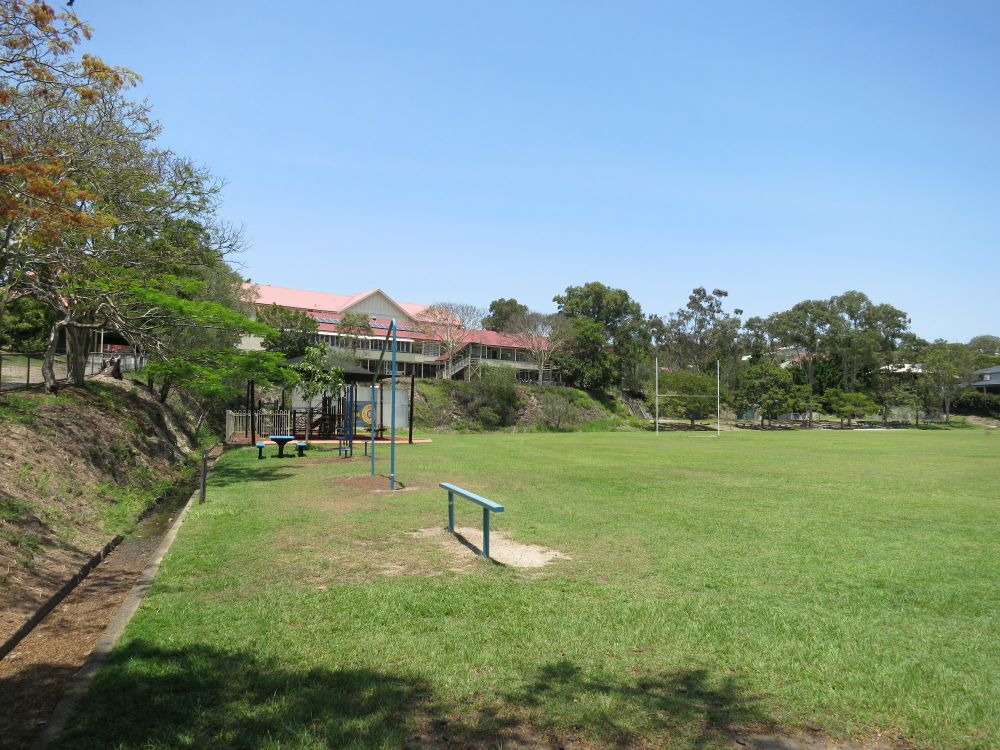
View across the playing fields, 2015

The school grounds contain mature trees, including two large fig trees (Ficus, sp.) along the Banks Street boundary, in front of Block A, and a row of four large fig trees and a kauri pine north of the tennis courts (along the former police reserve boundary), some of which, according to aerial photos, were planted prior to 1936. A mature Grey Gum (Eucalyptus sp.) is located to the west of Block B.

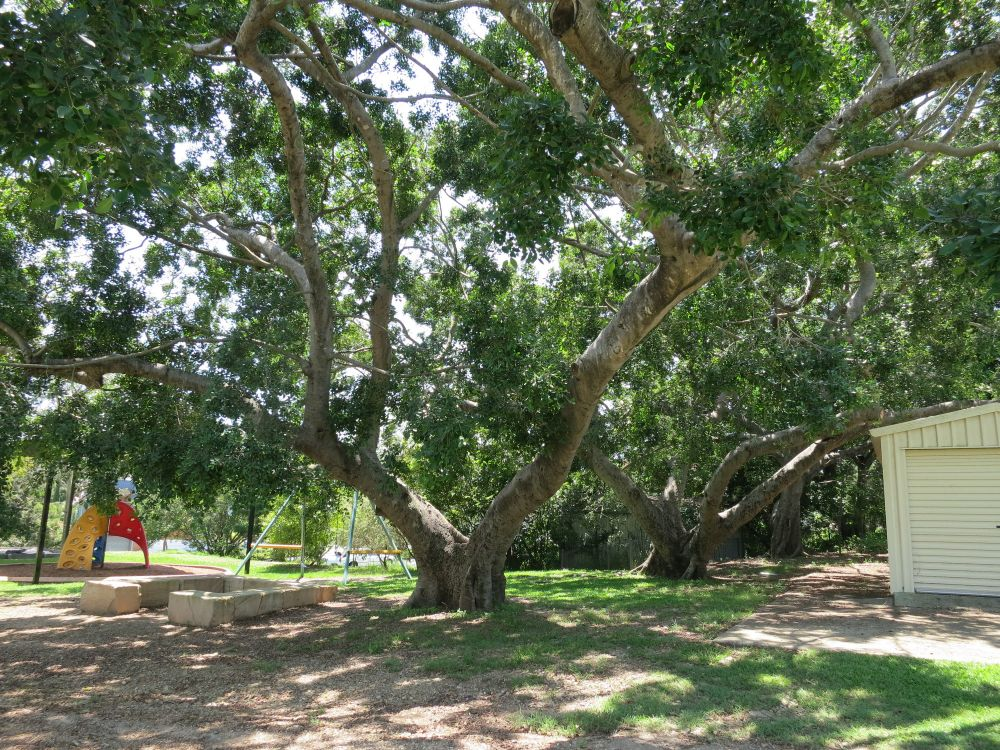
Mature fig trees in north-east corner of the grounds, 2015

The area between Block A and Banks Street includes an early layout of pathways (now relined with concrete and bitumen) and a garden area that contains several memorials. A concrete panel, broken into two pieces and set into the gardens, features the metal lettering: "228" and "NSS".

Extensive views of the surrounding suburbs and the Brisbane CBD can be obtained from Block A and within the school grounds. Block A, famed by the large fig trees, is a prominent feature in the area.

== Heritage listing ==
Newmarket State School was listed on the Queensland Heritage Register on 5 February 2016 having satisfied the following criteria.

The place is important in demonstrating the evolution or pattern of Queensland's history.

Newmarket State School (established 1904) is important in demonstrating the evolution of state education and its associated architecture in Queensland. The place retains a representative example of a standard, government designed Depression-era brick school building (1934, extended 1947) that was an architectural response to prevailing government educational philosophies, and a Boulton & Paul Building (1954) with Department of Public Works-designed extensions (1955, 1956) that were a response to acute building shortages and population growth in the post-World War II period; set in landscaped grounds with earthworks, assembly and play areas, sporting facilities, paths, and mature trees.

The Depression-era brick school building and landscaping of the school grounds are the result of the State Government's building and relief work programmes during the 1930s that stimulated the economy and provided work for men unemployed as a result of the Great Depression.

The Boulton & Paul Building, a type that was imported from Britain in the early 1950s, demonstrates the introduction and adoption of prefabricated systems by the Queensland Government during a period of rapid school expansion to cope with a large increase in student numbers. The Department of Public Works-designed extensions demonstrate the influence of Boulton & Paul buildings on subsequent Department of Public Works school designs.

The place is important in demonstrating the principal characteristics of a particular class of cultural places.

Newmarket State School is important in demonstrating the principal characteristics of Queensland state schools. These include: teaching buildings constructed to standard designs by the Queensland Government; and generous, landscaped sites, with mature trees, assembly and play areas, and sporting facilities. The school is a good, intact example of a suburban school complex, comprising a Depression-era brick school building and a Boulton & Paul Building with Department of Public Works-designed extensions.

The Depression-era brick school building is a good, intact example of its type. It demonstrates the principal characteristics of Depression-era brick schools, including: its two-storey form; high-quality design with ornamental features from one of a variety of styles; face brick exterior; and prominent entrance bay. The building plan comprises a typical linear layout of classrooms, offices and store rooms, accessed by single long corridor. The toilet block extension (1947) is complementary to the 1934 building and respects the scale and design intention of the original plans.

The Boulton & Paul Building is a good, intact example of its type, and clearly demonstrates the characteristics of a prefabricated building through the expression of its modular construction of 4-foot (1.2 m) wide wall panels. Other characteristic features of this type include: its timber-framed, lightweight construction; gable roof; verandah for circulation, with glazed screens at the ends; large areas of glazing to the north and south walls; classroom size of 24 by 24 feet (7.3 by 7.3 m); and flat internal wall linings.

The place is important because of its aesthetic significance.

Through its substantial size, high quality materials, face brick exterior, elegant formal composition and decorative treatment, the Depression-era brick school building at Newmarket State School has aesthetic significance due to its expressive attributes, which evoke the sense of progress and permanence that the Queensland Government sought to embody in new public buildings in that era.

The building is also significant for its streetscape contribution. Standing on an elevated site and framed by mature fig trees, it is an attractive and prominent feature of the area. Extensive views of the surrounding suburbs and of the Brisbane CBD are obtained from within the building.

The place has a strong or special association with a particular community or cultural group for social, cultural or spiritual reasons.

Schools have always played an important part in Queensland communities. They typically retain significant and enduring connections with former pupils, parents, and teachers; provide a venue for social interaction and volunteer work; and are a source of pride, symbolising local progress and aspirations.

Newmarket State School has a strong and ongoing association with the surrounding community. It was established in 1904 through the fundraising efforts of the local community and generations of Newmarket children have been taught there. The place is important for its contribution to the educational development of Newmarket and is a prominent community focal point and gathering place for social and commemorative events with widespread community support.

== See also ==
- History of state education in Queensland
- List of schools in Greater Brisbane
