= Newmarket, Queensland =

Newmarket
- Suburb
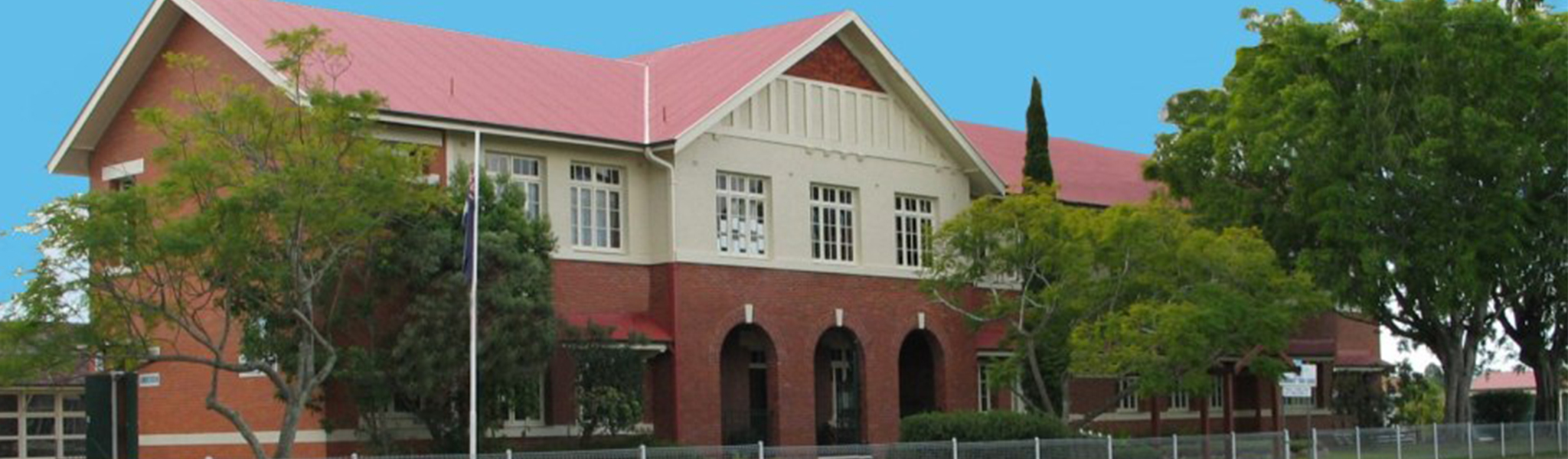
- Newmarket State School, circa 2022

- Interactive map of Newmarket
- Coordinates: 27.4366°S 153.0066°E
- Country: Australia
- State: Queensland
- City: Brisbane
- LGA: City of Brisbane (Enoggera Ward)
- Location: 5.1 km (3.2 mi) NNW of Brisbane CBD

Government
  - State electorates: Stafford; Ferny Grove; Cooper
  - Federal division: Brisbane

Area
  - Total: 1.7 km^{2} (0.66 sq mi)

Population
  - Total: 5,083 (2021 census)
  - Density: 2,990/km^{2} (7,740/sq mi)
- Time zone: UTC+10:00 (AEST)
- Postcode: 4051
Suburbs around Newmarket
Alderley	Grange	Wilston
Alderley	Newmarket	Wilston
Ashgrove	Red Hill	Kelvin Grove

Newmarket is a north-west suburb in the City of Brisbane, Queensland, Australia. In the 2021 census, Newmarket had a population of 5,083 people.

== Geography ==
Newmarket is located approximately 5.1 kilometres (3.2 mi) by road from the Brisbane CBD.

It is an older, mostly residential suburb containing pre-war and post-war homes, including many fine examples of the Queenslander style of home. Over the last few years, some medium-density townhouses and unit blocks have appeared as well.

== History ==
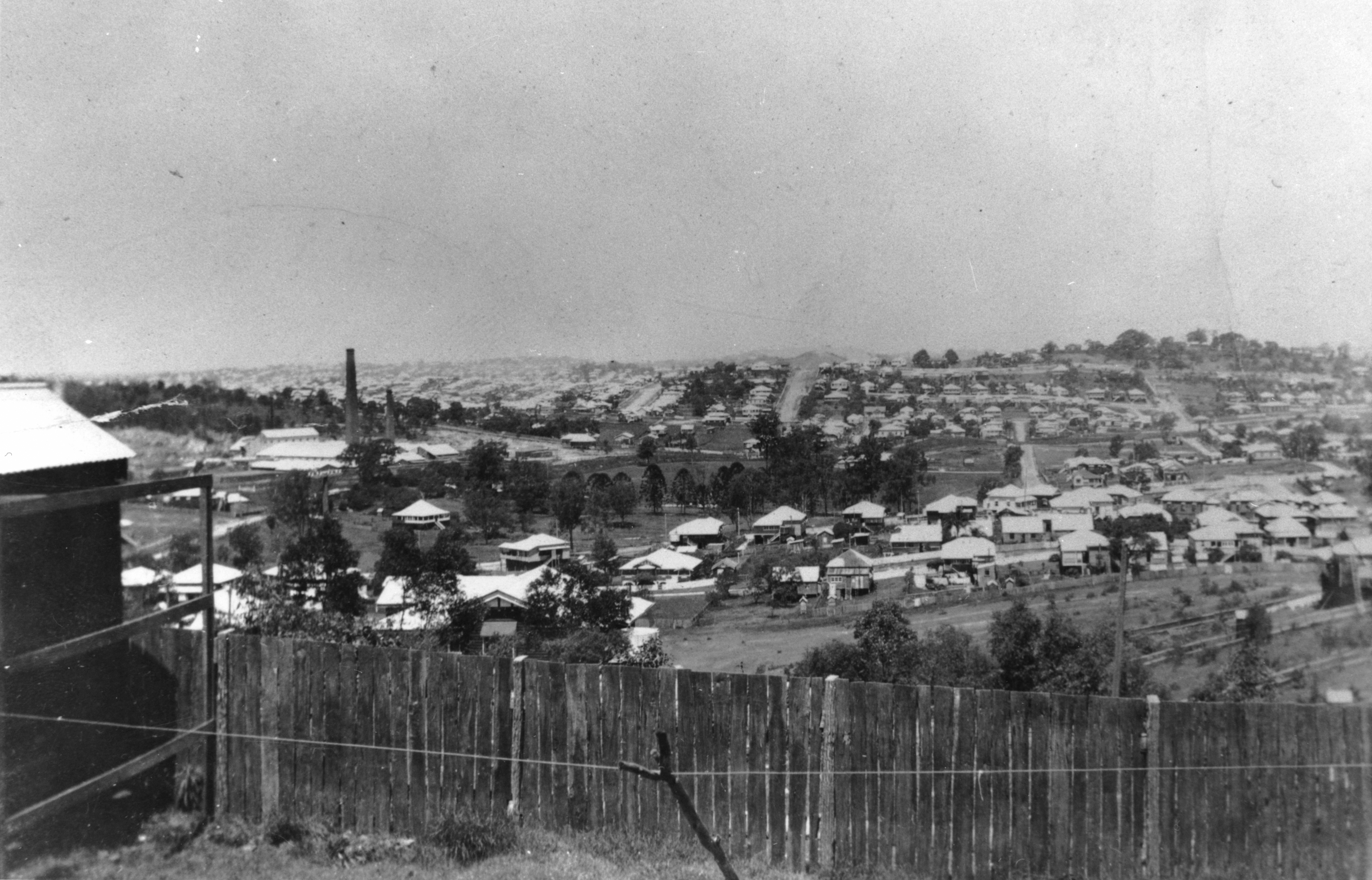
Brisbane suburb of Newmarket ca. 1925, chimney of the Newmarket Brickworks is visible on the left

Newmarket was originally known as "The Three Mile Scrub" due to its distance from the city, and Ashgrove Avenue, which links Enoggera Road with Waterworks Road to the west, was known as Three Mile Scrub Road. As Brisbane continued to grow northward along Kelvin Grove Road, in about 1880 it was decided to relocated Brisbane's livestock saleyards from Normanby to an outer location, the area now bordered by Enoggera Road, Newmarket Road, Wilston Road and Alderson Street. This area became known as the "new market" given the suburb its name. The new sale yards were serviced by Newmarket railway station after the rail line was extended from Mayne Junction in 1899.

In 1900, local residents were agitating to have the Kelvin Grove tramway extended along Enoggera Road to the Newmarket Hotel. However, a new bridge over Enoggera Creek would be required. Also there were concerns that the close proximity of the proposed tramway would take revenue away from the railway line. However these concerns were resolved and the tramway extension to the Newmarket Hotel was opened on Monday 27 July 1903.

On 20 April 1901, Bishop William Webber laid the foundation stone of St James' Anglican Church. The church was designed by architects John H. Buckeridge and Hall & Dods and built by G. Marshall and could seat 120 people. It was dedicated on Sunday 20 July 1901 by Bishop Webber. It is located at 58 Enoggera Road (27.4395°S 153.0067°E).

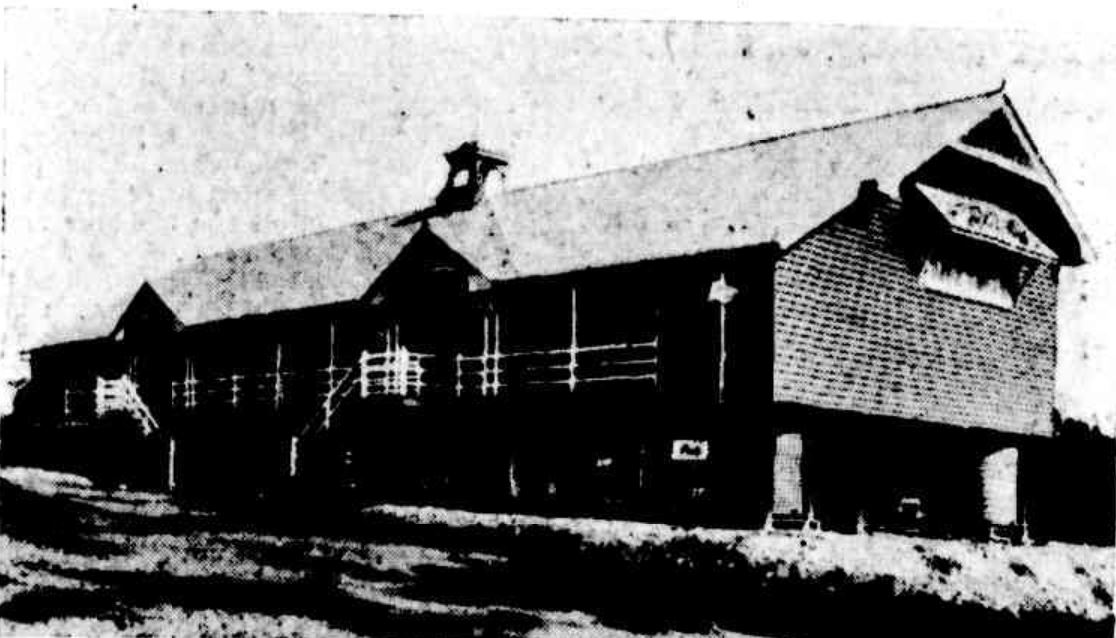
Newmarket State School, at the time of opening, July 1904

Newmarket State School opened on 4 July 1904.

The Newmarket Brickworks were constructed in Mina Parade in 1912 with a chimney over 50 metres (160 ft) tall. The brickwords were demolished in 1987 but the Newmarket Brickworks chimney remains and is now heritage-listed. However, due to changes in the suburb boundaries, the chimney is now officially in the neighbouring suburb of Alderley.

The Ruby Estate, Kelvin Grove (now known as Newmarket), being re-subdivision of subdivision 43 of suburban portion, 25 parish of Enoggera were auctioned on site by G.T Bell Auctioneer on 22 August 1914, at 3pm. The terms of the sale required a £2 deposit and £1 per month per lot with the interest rate at 5%. The 22 building sites situated between Foster street and Ruby street, Kelvin Grove (Newmarket) Brisbane, were advertised as consisting of 16 perches and two minutes from the Kelvin Grove tram terminus. The original advertisement showed that between blocks 2 and 3 held a house on site, for removal. The following Monday 24 August 1914, it was published in The Telegraph newspaper, that 16 allotments of the Ruby Estate, Kelvin Grove (Newmarket) were sold during the auction.

In about March 1918, a block of land was purchased for £100 to build a Baptist church in Newmarket/Grange. The church opened on Saturday 21 June 1919. The church was at 197 Wilston Road (corner of Carberry Street) in the suburb of Grange and is known as Grange Baptist Church.

The sale of the McCook Estate, at the time part of the suburb Kelvin Grove, now Newmarket, by Auctioneers, Martin Snelling & Co, occurred on 3 March 1928 at 3 pm on the grounds. It was offered again for sale by auction on 14 April 1928. The Estate comprised 19 splendid business and residential sites, located on the corner of Kelvin Grove Road and Parker street and backing onto Foster street. The advertisement emphasised the convenience of the location, situated on the tram line, with a 15-minute ride to the GPO and proximity to the shopping centre, picture theatre, churches, and state schools.

The saleyards were moved to Cannon Hill in 1931. Evidence of the sale-yards can still be seen in several narrow laneways including one known as Saleyards Lane, most likely old cattle tracks between stockyards, that still exist in this neighbourhood.

In 1933, Andrew Lind and William Abel Gray created a company called Linray (a combination of their surnames) to build 107 houses on the former saleyards. Although there was general support for the project, not enough people were able to buy the houses during the Great Depression and the company ended up in debt before completing all the houses.

St Ambrose's Catholic School opened in 1936.

The suburbs' only secondary school, Newmarket State High School, opened on 29 January 1963 and closed on 13 December 1996. It was located immediately west of Newmarket State School, extending from Brent Street south towards Banks Street (27.4319°S 153.0022°E). The school's site has been redeveloped for housing and a small local park (Nelson Place Park) with the creation of Nelson Place, Laurence Street, and Daniel Place.

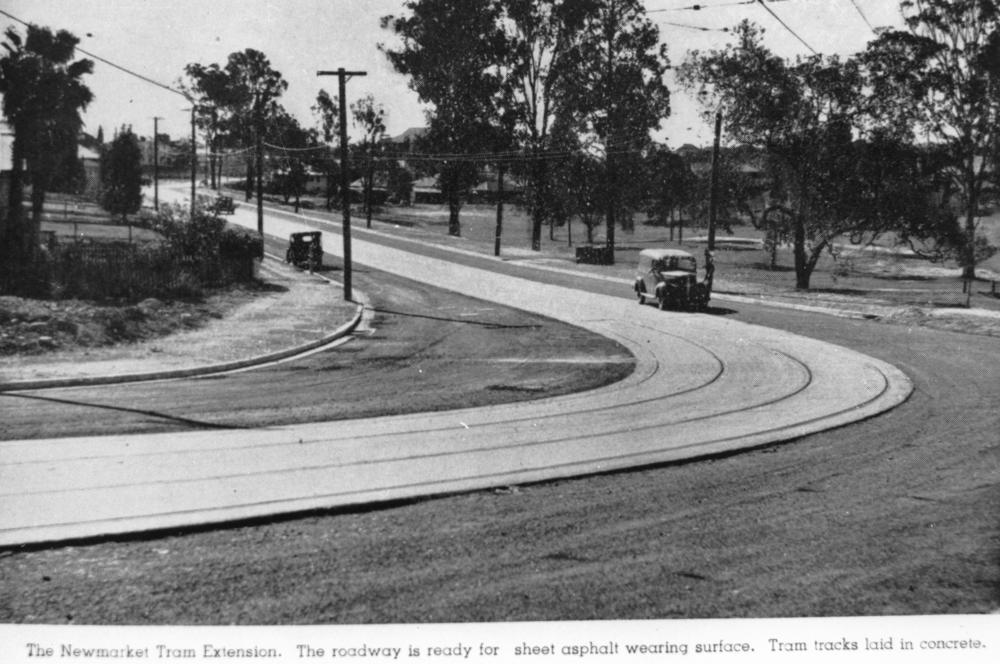
Tram extension in Newmarket, 1949

Until December 1968 trams operated by the Brisbane City Council plied along Enoggera Road. A former tramway electrical substation still stands on the corner of Kate Street and Enoggera Road and has been transformed into a contemporary dwelling.

== Demographics ==
In the 2011 census, the population of Newmarket was 4,444, 51.8% female and 48.2% male. The median age of the Newmarket population was 32 years of age, 5 years below the Australian median. 76% of people living in Newmarket were born in Australia, compared to the national average of 69.8%; the next most common countries of birth were England 3.4%, New Zealand 2.6%, India 1.9%, China 1.2%, Korea, Republic of 0.7%. 85.6% of people spoke only English at home; the next most common languages were 1.1% Mandarin, 1% Italian, 0.7% Cantonese, 0.7% Spanish, 0.6% Korean.

In the 2016 census, Newmarket had a population of 4,979 people.

In the 2021 census, Newmarket had a population of 5,083 people.

== Heritage listings ==
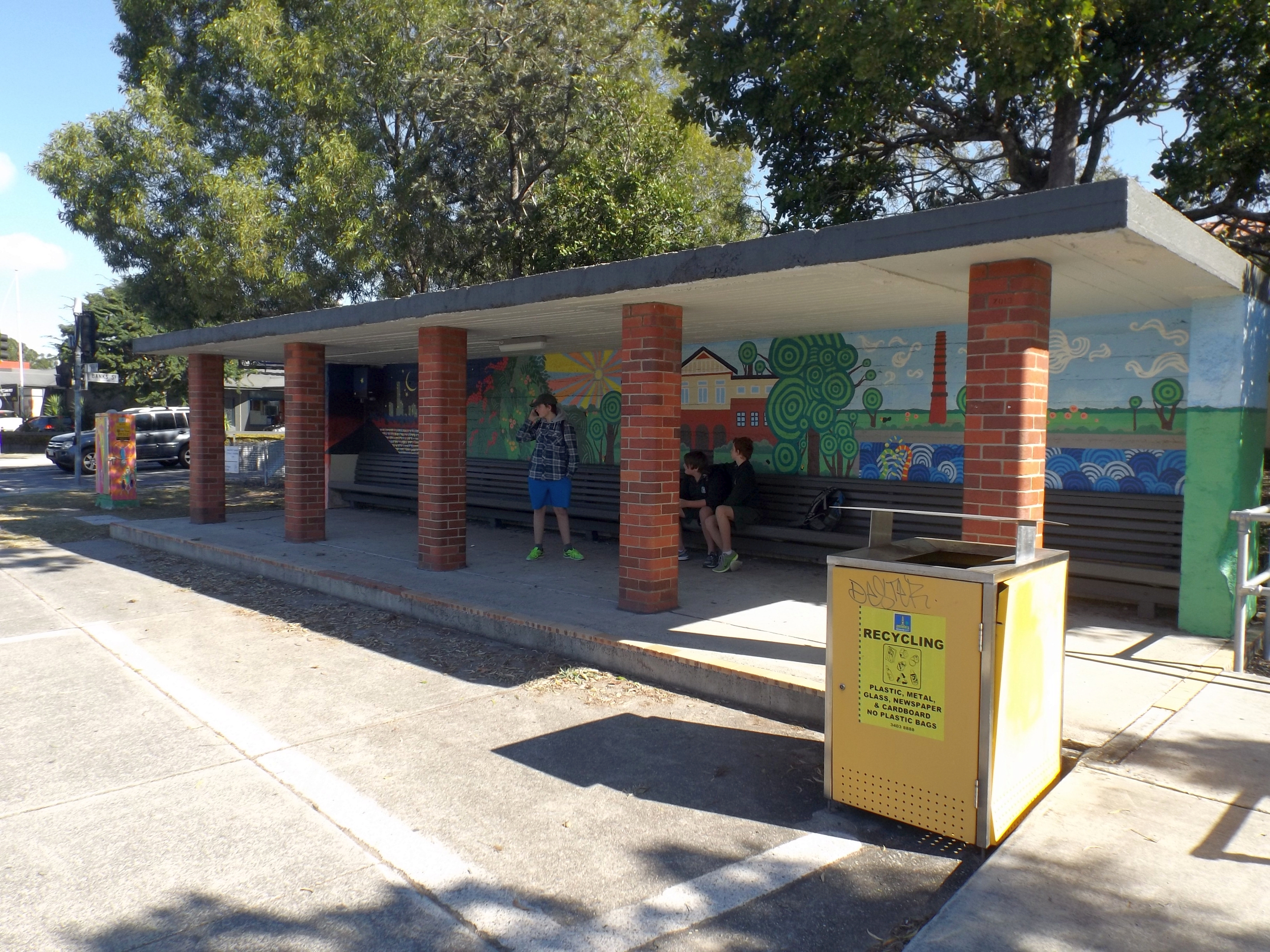
Newmarket Air Raid Shelter, 2015

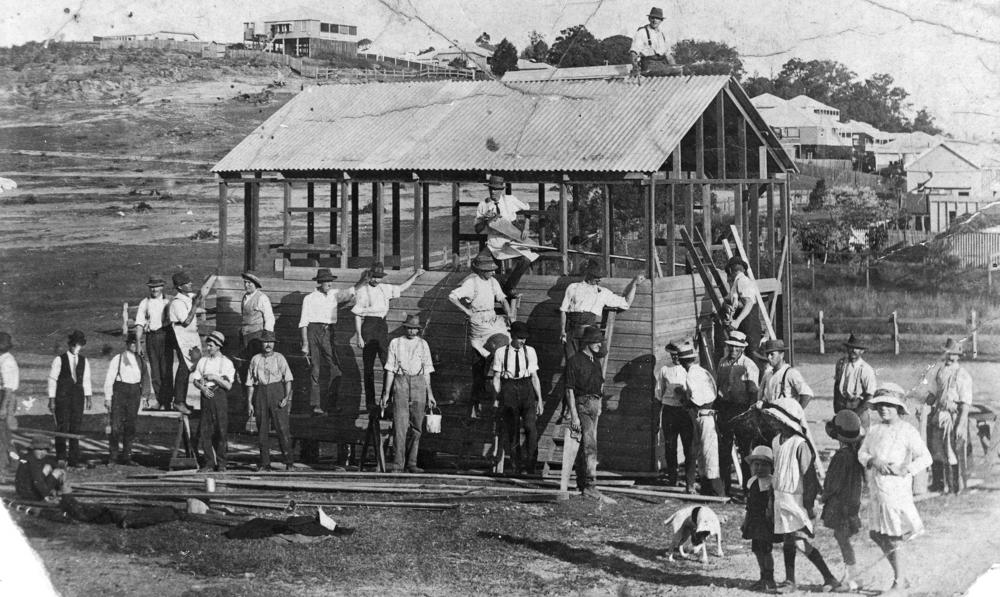
Building the Newmarket Progress Hall, corner of Wilston Road and Daisy Street, Brisbane, 1915

Newmarket has a number of heritage-listed sites, including:

- Bearsden (Victorian-era Queenslander house): 10 Bearsden Avenue
- Nahoun (World War I bungalow): 20 Davidson Street
- Corinthia – St Ambrose's Catholic Precinct (also known as St. Ambrose's Presbytery): 23 Davidson Street
- Federation-era Queenslander house: 15 Edgar Street
- Ivy Cottage (also known as Glengyte): 102 Edmondstone Street
- Monahilla (also known as Rosie's Boarding House): 4 Enoggera Road
- Victorian-era Queenslander house: 12 Enoggera Road
- Former Kelvin Grove Methodist/Uniting Church: 36 Enoggera Road
- St James' Anglican Church and Rectory: 58 Enoggera Road
- Newmarket Memorial Hall: 92 Enoggera Road
- Newmarket State School: 320 Enoggera Road
- Former Newmarket Police Station & residence (also known as Enoggera police residence): 334 Enoggera Road
- Substation No. 238: 306 Newmarket Road
- Newmarket Air Raid Shelter: outside 320 Enoggera Road (27.4319°S 153.0049°E)
- Wilston House: 47 Watson Street:
- Newmarket railway station: 79A Wilston Road
- Victorian-era Queenslander house: 170 Wilston Road
- Newmarket-Grange Progress Association: 187 Wilston Road
- Wilston railway station: 339A Newmarket Road

== Education ==
Newmarket State School is a government primary (Prep–6) school for boys and girls at 15 Banks Street (27.4322°S 153.0040°E). In 2017, the school had an enrolment of 263 students with 26 teachers (17 full-time equivalent) and 17 non-teaching staff (10 full-time equivalent). In 2018, the school had an enrolment of 279 students with 26 teachers (18 full-time equivalent) and 17 non-teaching staff (10 full-time equivalent).

St Ambrose's Primary School is a Catholic primary (Prep–6) school for boys and girls at 23 Davidson Street (27.4405°S 153.0059°E). In 2017, the school had an enrolment of 273 students with 20 teachers (16 full-time equivalent) and 13 non-teaching staff (7 full-time equivalent). In 2018, the school had an enrolment of 254 students with 20 teachers (16 full-time equivalent) and 11 non-teaching staff (7 full-time equivalent).

Brisbane Urban Environmental Education Centre is an Outdoor and Environmental Education Centre at 15 Banks Street (27.4318°S 153.0048°E).

The suburb used have a secondary school, Newmarket State High School, off 47 Banks Street which opened on 29 January 1963, but subsequently closed on 13 December 1996. As of 2025, there are no secondary schools in Newmarket, leaving the nearest government secondary school as Kelvin Grove State College, in neighbouring Kelvin Grove to the south.

== Amenities ==
Newmarket offers a number of options to locals and nearby residents. The Brisbane City Council operates a public swimming pool in Sedgeley Park, on Alderson Street. Enoggera Creek, which forms the southern boundary of Newmarket, contains a linear park and bikeway. The suburb has several sporting ovals, including Spencer Park, which is home to former NSL and current Brisbane Premier League team Brisbane City Football Club and Windsor Royals Baseball Club, and McCook Park, which is home to Newmarket SFC soccer club.

The first stage of the Newmarket Shopping Centre opened in 2005. The shopping centre contains a Coles supermarket, post office, Commonwealth Bank of Australia branch, newsagent and several specialty stores. The historic Newmarket Hotel, established 1897, has been completely renovated and is now a buzzing hive of activity most nights of the week. Both the Newmarket Hotel and shopping centre are located on the corner of Newmarket Road and Enoggera Road, at Newmarket. Brisbane Mexican cuisine pioneers Pepe's Mexican Restaurant moved to Newmarket in 2006. In 2018, the southern end of the centre was refurbished in order to create space for the recently built Newmarket cinemas and nearby restaurants.

== Transport ==
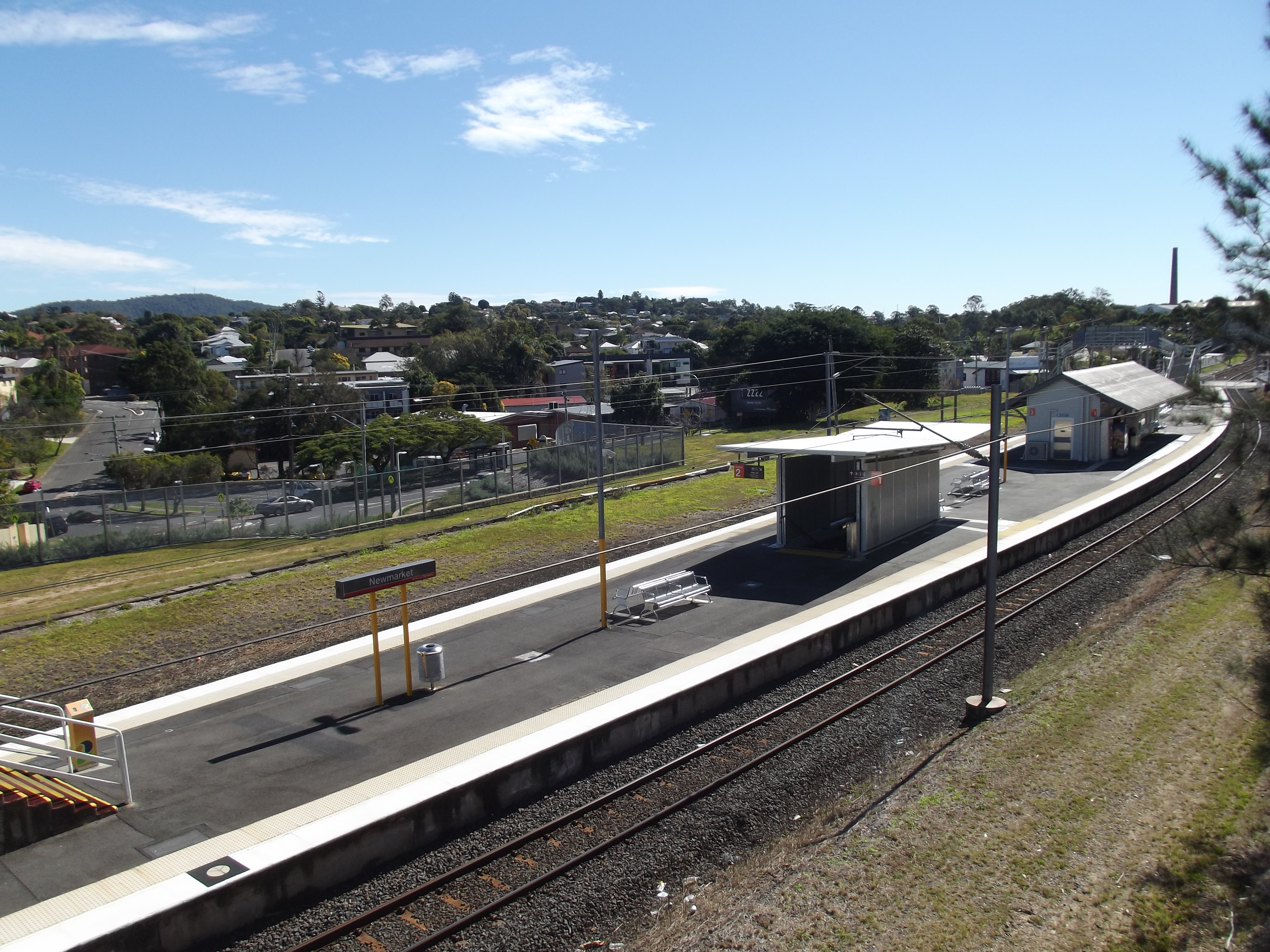
Newmarket railway station, 2012

Via Train, Newmarket Railway Station provides access to regular Queensland Rail City network services on the Ferny Grove railway line arranging travel to the Brisbane CBD, Beenleigh and Ferny Grove.

Via Bus, Newmarket is serviced by Transport for Brisbane buses to Chermside, Mitchelton and to The City.

Via Road, Newmarket's main arterials are Enoggera Road which is the main corridor for motorists travelling to The City and Alderley, as well as Newmarket Road which is the main corridor for motorists travelling to Lutwyche.
