= Newmarket State High School =

Defunct school in Brisbane, Australia

Location
- 47 Banks Street; Newmarket, Brisbane, Queensland, 4051; Australia; 27°25′55″S 153°00′15″E

Information
- Type: State secondary day school
- Motto: Latin: Sic Itur Ad Astra (Thus We Go To The Stars)
- Religious affiliation: Non-denominational
- Established: 1963
- Closed: 1996
- Year levels: Year 8 – Year 12
- Gender: Coeducational
- Area: 3.4 hectares (34,000.0 m^{2})
- Campus type: Suburban
- Houses: Jagara; Kabi; Waka; Yungi
- Colours: Blue; Grey; White
- Yearbook: Jakaway

Newmarket State High School was a secondary school in the suburb of Newmarket in Brisbane, (Queensland, Australia). It was located 5 km from the city in the north-west of Brisbane, part of South East Queensland. The school's entrance was off Banks Street, with the school located on land between Banks Street and Brent Street in what is now Laurence Street, Daniel Place, Nelson Place, and associated developments. The school site was in the City of Brisbane local government area for the entirety of its operation.

== Etymology ==
The school was named after the suburb it was located in, and the suburb of Newmarket itself was named for the historical cattle saleyards that operated from 1877 to 1931 at the north-east corner of Enoggera and Newmarket Roads, which, due to urban development of Newmarket, were moved to Cannon Hill in 1931.

== History ==
=== Opening ===
The school was originally opened on 29 January 1963.

=== Closure ===
In 1995, after a decision was made to close the school, the school stopped taking new enrolments. A closing ceremony was held on 7 December 1996. The school closed on 13 December 1996. The closure of the school was described by John-Paul Langbroek as an example in the metropolitan region of a school closure in an area of "limited population growth or enrolment expectations in the catchment area with an alternative school within close proximity".

=== Site Redevelopment ===
A feasibility study was conducted by the Queensland Department of Emergency Services and Office of Sport and Recreation on the conversion of Newmarket State High School into a suitable headquarters for the Queensland Academy of Sport. However, the site was eventually completely redeveloped for housing and a small local park (Nelson Place Park). The school land was marketed through an expressions-of-interest campaign by PRD Realty. During its operation, the school was initially accessible through a driveway off Banks Street (57 Banks Street), an address which no longer exists, being redeveloped into a road leading onto Laurence Street, Daniel Place, and Nelson Place, with the old school entrance now functioning as the Nelson Place entrance to the land located between Banks Street and Brent Street, via these newly created streets.

== Infrastructure ==
=== Buildings ===
The school had some permanent buildings and two temporary prefabricated classrooms.

=== Seating ===
Outside seating facilities were provided. In 1989, upgrades were needed because the 150-seat capacity was insufficient for the 500-student attendance, necessitating students sitting on wet grass or wet bricks during wintertime breaks.

=== Library ===
In the 1987 state government education budget, funds were allocated for a new library at the school. The library was opened on 27 April 1988 by then Minister for Education, Brian George Littleproud.

== Administration ==
=== Principals ===
The first principal of the school was K. P. O'Connor, and the final principal was Karyn A. Hart. The principals of the school included:

Principals of the school
Principal	Tenure		Ref
Principal	Initial Year	Final Year	Ref
K. P. O'Connor ^{†}	1963	1964	
E. D. Evans	1965	1974	
Kimmorley	1975	1976	
J. Mahony	1977		
Ken Gilbert	1978	1984	
J. L. Shepherd	1985		
J. Deakin	1986	1987	
Karyn A. Hart	1988	1996	

† O'Connor became the principal of Everton Park State High School in 1965, then became the principal of Wavell State High School in 1968.

An English teacher of note at the school was Janette Turner Hospital, who went on to become an award-winning Australian-born novelist and short story writer.

== Students ==
While the school originally had an enrolment of around 1,000, this enrolment decreased significantly to about 600–700 students, a decrease attributed by critics, such as William Armstrong Moore (Member for Windsor), to both a change of principal and a change in the school's ideology. In 1978, the number of students decreased to about 450–470. In 1989, seven years before the school's closure, the school was reported to have 500 students in attendance.

A student representative council (SRC), composed of 28–30 students, existed from 1979.

== Curriculum ==
Joint educational ventures were conducted with TAFE teachers who were available at the school, with more than 100 volunteers helping with reading and writing training.

== Yearbook ==
The yearbook was called Jakaway, a combination of the first two letters of each of the school's sports houses.

== Sports ==
=== Houses ===
There were four school houses named after Aboriginal tribes thought to be living in the local areas of Newmarket and Alderley in the 19th century:

Sports houses
House Name	Aboriginal tribes	Colour	Student Surname	Ref
Jagara	Jagera ^{†}	Green	A-E	
Kabi	Kabi Kabi	Red	F-L	
Waka	Wakka Wakka	Gold	M-R	
Yungi	Yungi	Blue	S-Z	

† The school was located on Turrbal and Jagera traditional land.

== See also ==
- List of schools in Greater Brisbane
- Education in Queensland
- Queensland state schools
- History of state education in Queensland
- List of schools in Queensland
- Lists of schools in Australia
