= Newmarket railway station, Brisbane =

Railway station in Queensland, Australia

Newmarket
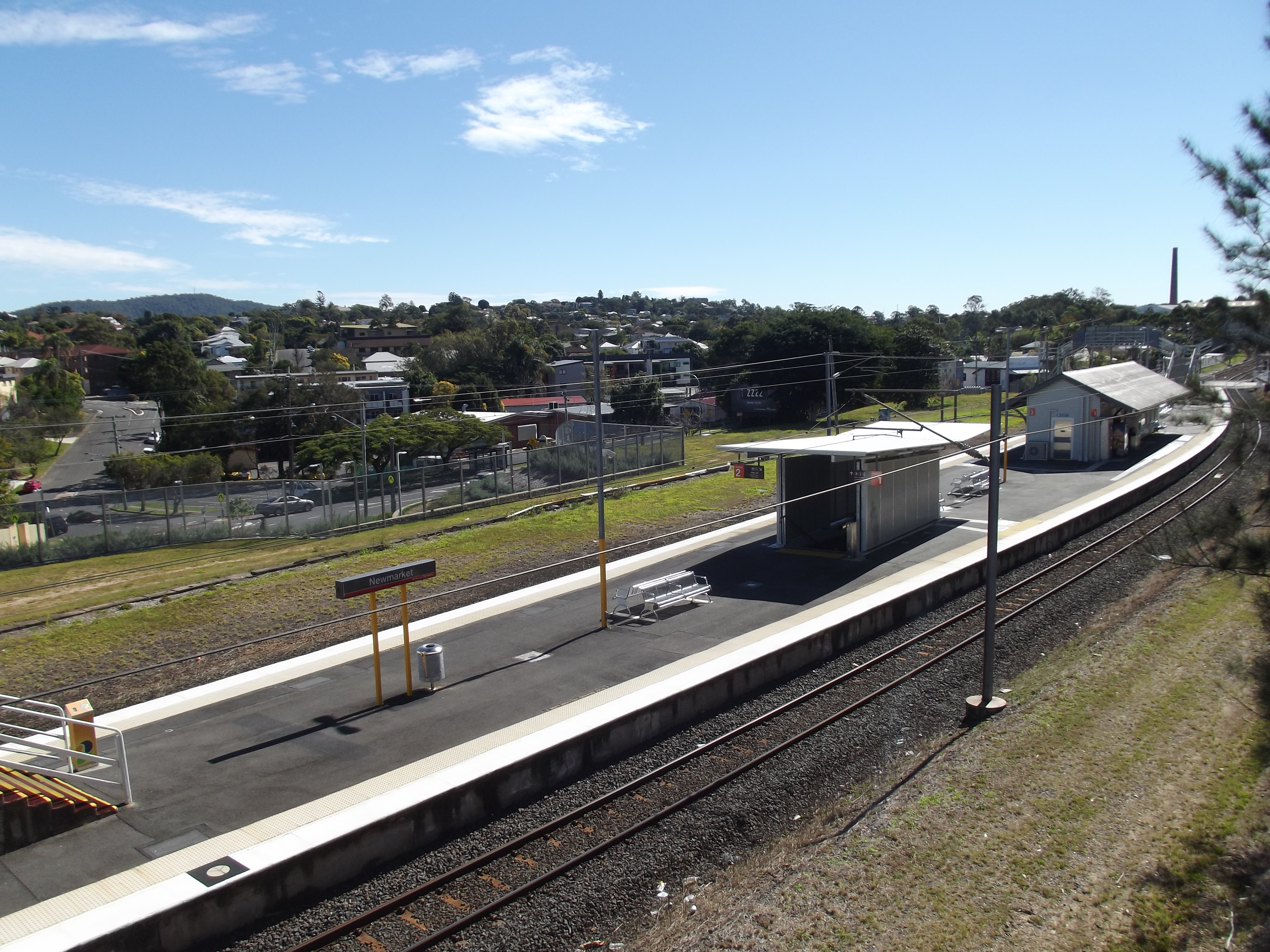
- Newmarket station in August 2012

General information
- Location: Abuklea Street, Newmarket
- Coordinates: 27.43296°S 153.01065°E
- Owner: Queensland Rail
- Operator: Queensland Rail
- Line: Ferny Grove
- Distance: 6.52 kilometres from Central
- Platforms: 2 (1 island)
- Tracks: 2

Construction
- Structure type: Ground
- Accessible: Assisted

Other information
- Status: Staffed part time
- Station code: 600373 (platform 1); 600374 (platform 2)
- Fare zone: Zone 1
- Website: Queensland Rail

History
- Rebuilt: 2017-2018

Services
| Preceding station | Queensland Rail | Following station |
|---|---|---|
| Wilston towards Beenleigh via Roma Street | Ferny Grove line | Alderley towards Ferny Grove |
Location

Newmarket is a railway station operated by Queensland Rail on the Ferny Grove line. It opened in 1899 and serves the Brisbane suburb of Newmarket. It is a ground level station, featuring one island platform with two faces.

== History ==
With the opening of the Enoggera Line in 1899, the stock saleyards which were moved to Newmarket from Normanby circa 1880.

The station was originally used as a rail yard mainly used for transporting cattle from the sales yard between Wilston Road and Enoggera Road. The remains of the rail yard where the stock used to be loaded can be seen from platform 1 today.

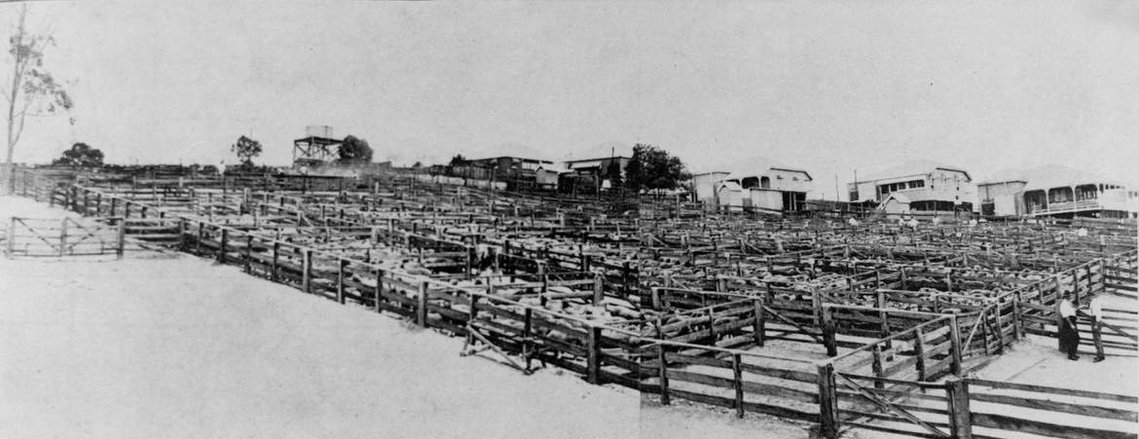
Cattle yards in Newmarket

== Services ==
Newmarket station is served by all stops Ferny Grove line services from Ferny Grove to Roma Street, Boggo Road (formerly Park Road), Coopers Plains and Beenleigh.

== Platforms and services ==
Newmarket platform arrangement
| Platform | Line | Destination | Notes |
|---|---|---|---|
| 1 | Ferny Grove | Roma Street (to Beenleigh line) | |
| 2 | Ferny Grove | Ferny Grove | |
