= Newmarket Brickworks Chimney =

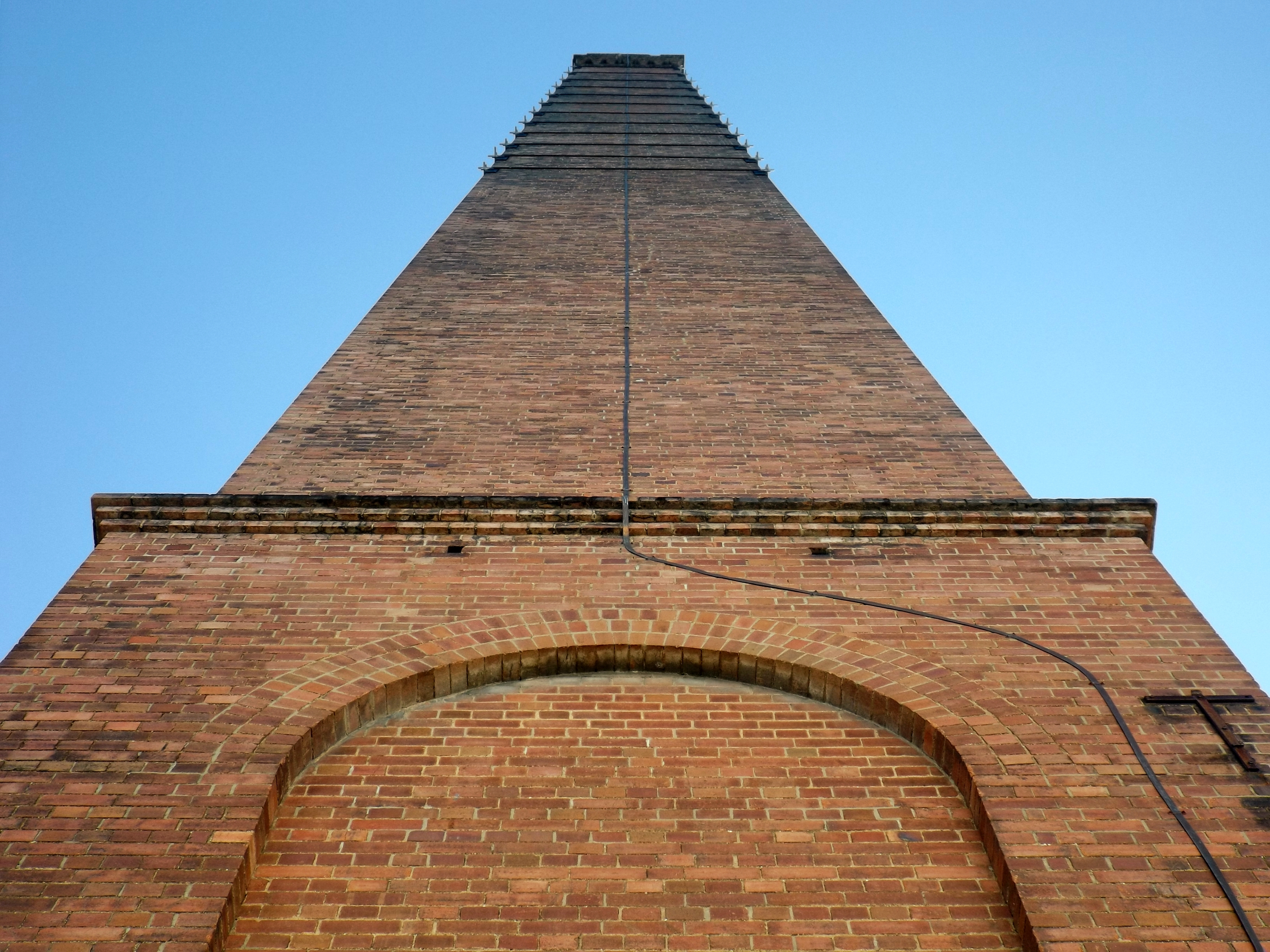
- Structure in 2015

- Location within Queensland Location within Australia
- 27.4277°S 153.0064°E
- Location: 117 Mina Parade, Alderley, City of Brisbane, Queensland, Australia

History
- Design period: 1900–1914 (early 20th century)
- Built: 1912

Queensland Heritage Register
- Official name: Newmarket Brickworks Chimney, Hoffman Stack
- Type: state heritage (built)
- Designated: 24 March 2000
- Reference no.: 601357
- Significant period: 1912 (fabric); 1912–1987 (historical)

Newmarket Brickworks Chimney is a heritage-listed brickworks at 117 Mina Parade, Alderley, City of Brisbane, Queensland, Australia. It was built in 1912. It is also known as Hoffman Stack. It was added to the Queensland Heritage Register on 24 March 2000.

== History ==
The Newmarket Brickworks Chimney was constructed in 1912. At this time, it formed part of the new complex constructed by Aleck Anderson, a former Clerk of Works, known as the Brisbane Brick and Builders Supply Company Ltd – or Brisbane Brick, as it was widely known.

Brickmaking has been practised in Queensland since the days of the Moreton Bay penal settlement in the 1820s. Local clay was used for making bricks, firstly in Redcliffe, and then in Brisbane Town. The clayfield in the later case was situated near the stream at the back of the convict settlement. A kiln was first built near the river but a new kiln was built at the field. Brick production was well under way by the beginning of 1826. A boost was given to the use of brick in Queensland, following a disastrous fire in Queen Street in 1864. Changes made to Local Government Ordinances in response to this encouraged the use of brick for building, although the costs involved meant that brick were mainly used for commercial and public buildings.

The development of the brick manufacturing industry, given the wide availability of timber in Queensland, has been faced with obstacles. A group of Brisbane builders and architects, led by Aleck Anderson, a former Clerk of Works, and also an experienced builder, formed Brisbane Brick and Builders Supply Company Ltd in 1911 to obtain good quality bricks, which were then not plentifully available in Brisbane. The Company based its design on the Hoffman method of brickmaking. The main kiln was known as the "Hoffman Kiln".

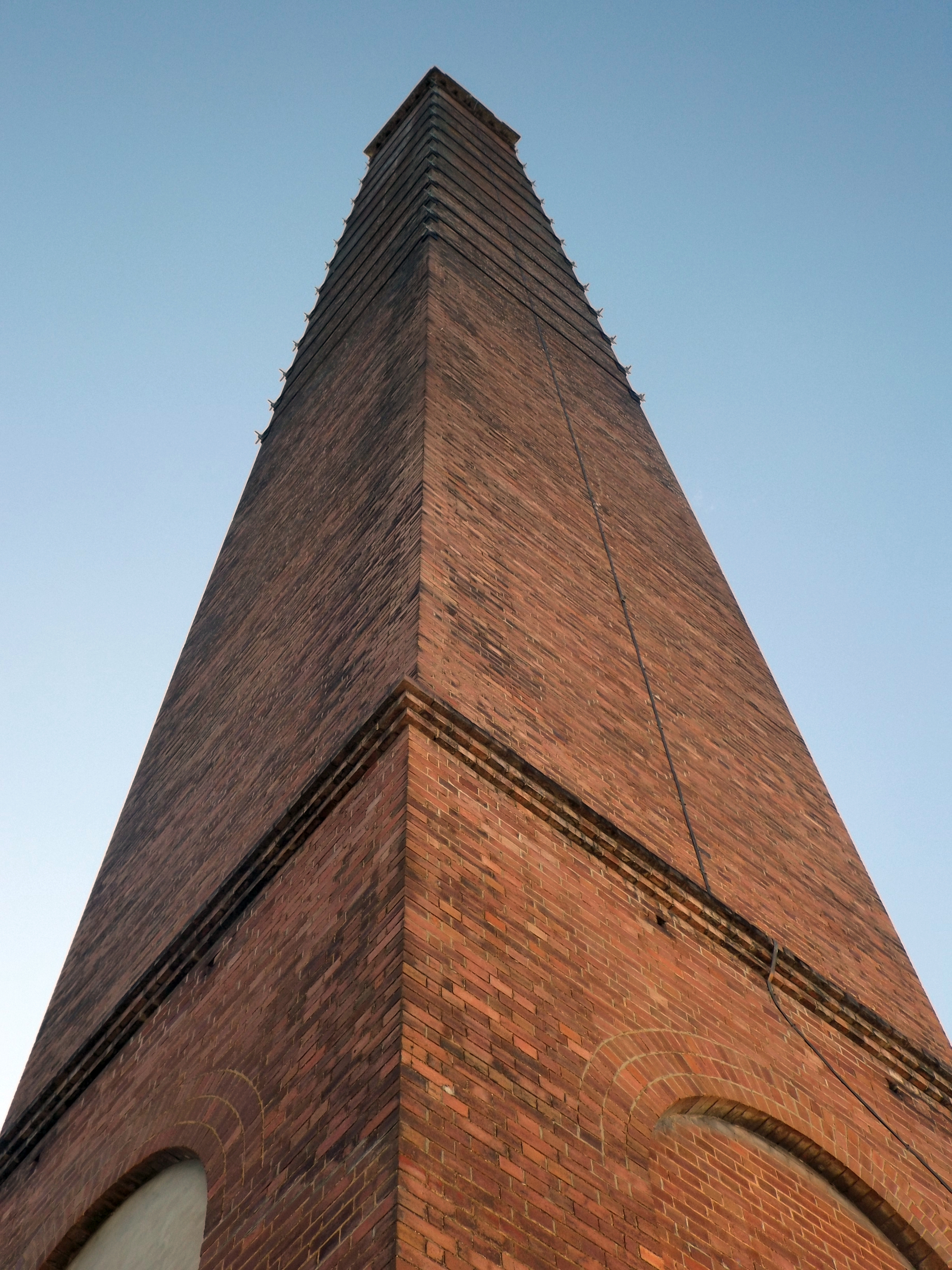
Chimney in 2015

Mechanisation of brickmaking began in the 1870s. By 1896 the successful Hoffman mechanical method of brickmaking was established in Australia, and for the first time, quality mass-produced bricks could be bought at prices well below those of the hand-made equivalent. The Hoffman method was named after Friedrich Hoffman, an Austrian, who invented the technique in 1859. The Hoffman method enabled drying and firing to take place simultaneously. Known as continuous firing, one chamber would be stacked with "green" bricks, other chambers contained bricks in increasing degrees of dryness, in another chamber firing may just have been commenced, while another may be in full firing, other chambers might be in various degrees of cooling while one chamber might remain empty.

Brisbane Brick made its first appearance in the Queensland Post Office Directory (Trades Directory) in 1912–13. As Queensland was essentially a timber state, the building industry developed mainly by the use of timber and the demand for bricks fell below production. Brickyards, quickly piled high with large stocks of unsold bricks, were often forced during those early years to close down for from six months to two years. After one of these closures the Brisbane Brick issued new preference shares to obtain capital to refit and modernise its original plant at Newmarket, and resume manufacturing. From then until the outbreak of World War II, the company stopped production for one or two brief periods. During the war, the Defence Department utilised the Newmarket sheds, kilns and yards to store goods such as clothing, boots and other equipment. The company's engineering staff were engaged to maintain Liberty ships and other defence work. World War II set the brick manufacturing industry back many years, and forced the closure of the company's works at Newmarket.

With the end of the war, the brick manufacturing industry then faced the introduction of price controls. At this time, the modernisation of many plants was slowed considerably. With the lifting of price controls many companies, Brisbane Brick included, began a concerted drive to make up for what was considered "lost time". Plants were improved and production methods were streamlined. Demand for bricks for homes and new commercial buildings soon outstripped production and the new industry faced a new, though welcome obstacle, keeping up with growing demand. Brisbane Brick opened Strathpine Bricks Pty Ltd in 1961, at this time the development of new processes, such as the new tunnel kiln equipment to produce bricks, gradually overhauled the shortage. At the time, Newmarket Bricks Pty Ltd, was a subsidiary of Brisbane Brick and Builders Supply Company. The design of the new Strathpine site was considered "as modern as tomorrow - the concept in brickworks design completely removes the traditional image of the old-type works with its towering smoke stack and unattractive factory".

Operation of the Newmarket brickworks were continued by PGH. By 1985, the Newmarket site had frontages to Alderley, Wakefield and Yarradale Streets and Mina Parade. In 1987 the brickworks were demolished and the site subdivided. Buildings demolished included the Hoffman kiln, drying kiln, sorting sheds, dome kiln buildings and an extruder presses building. Over the last decade, the site has been fully redeveloped for industrial purposes. At the time of demolition, the chimney was excluded from the demolition permit on the basis of its rarity as a remaining example in Brisbane of a load-bearing brick chimney stack.

== Description ==
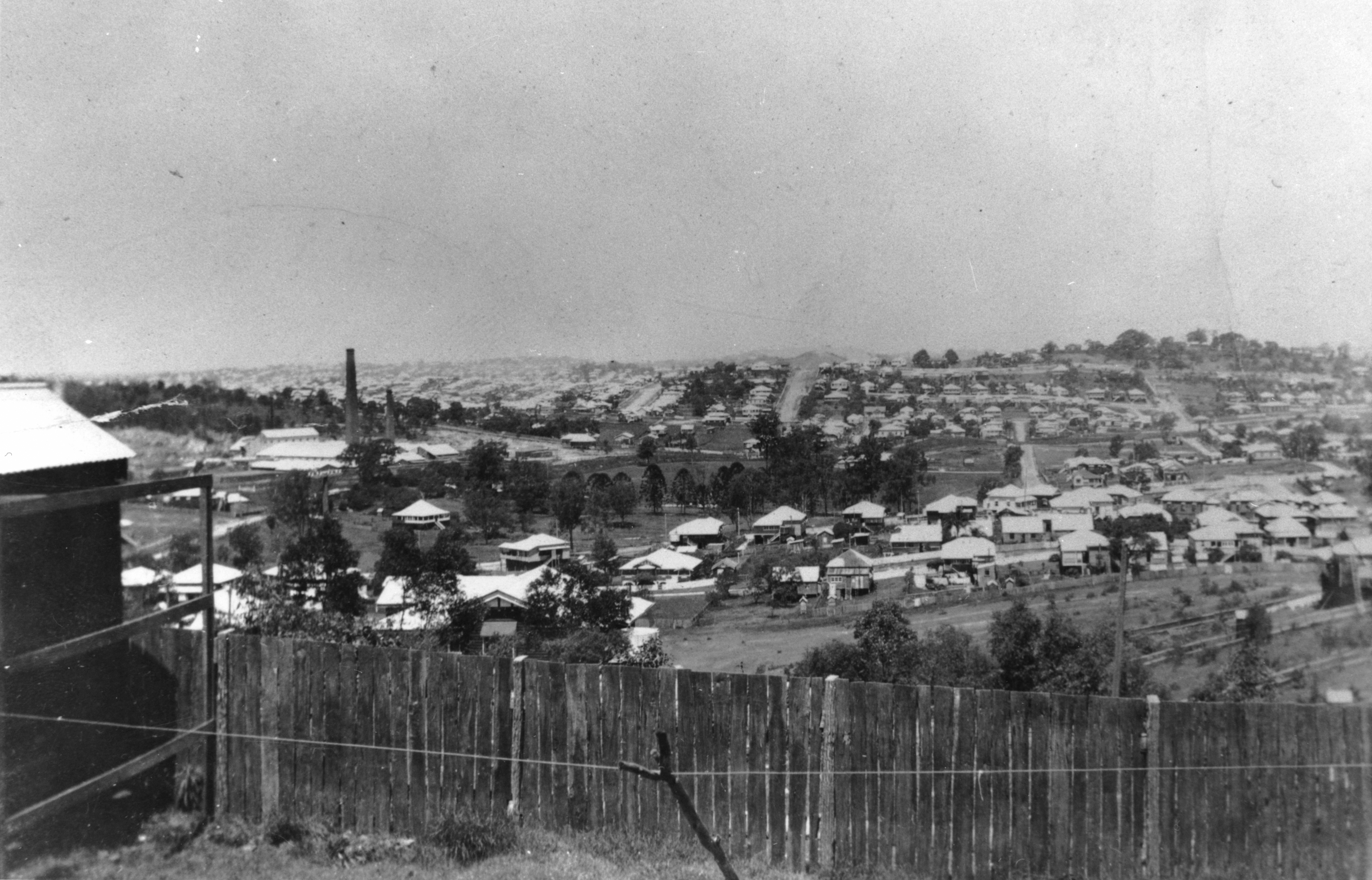
View of Newmarket with the brickworks chimney on the left, circa 1925

The brick chimney is located along Mina Parade, approximately 40 metres (130 ft) from the road. Access to the site is via an easement. The chimney rises to a height of approximately 55 metres (180 ft), and is, consequently, a prominent landmark. The square base is approximately 4.7 metres (15 ft) long. The chimney rises about 10 metres (33 ft) before tapering uniformly to about 3 metres (9.8 ft) square. On each face of the bottom section of the chimney there are a number of arched recesses, which appear to be decorative elements. One of the recesses, on the south side of the chimney, facing Mina Parade, has been enclosed with concrete. Several bands of brick as the top of the chimney flue provide further decorative elements to the structure. A metallic band running the length of the chimney on its eastern side, appears to be related to deflecting lightning strikes. Similarly, on the upper section of the chimney, a number of metallic bands are attached around the structure.

The chimney is in reasonably good condition, though there is some evidence of rising damp on the eastern side and a crack running the width of the structure, about 7 metres (23 ft) from the base, on the northern side. Mortar is breaking up and falling away in various sections on all four sides.

The whole of the area formerly occupied by the brickworks has been redeveloped and the chimney now stands in its own space.

== Heritage listing ==
Newmarket Brickworks Chimney was listed on the Queensland Heritage Register on 24 March 2000 having satisfied the following criteria.

The place is important in demonstrating the evolution or pattern of Queensland's history.

The Newmarket Brickworks Chimney is significant as a rare, surviving example of the brick manufacturing industry in Brisbane, and Queensland, in the early part of the 20th century. At this time, brick makers often struggled for patronage in a state which, predominantly, utilised timber in building construction.

The Newmarket Brickworks Chimney is associated with Brisbane Brick and Builders Supply Company Ltd, or Brisbane Brick as it was widely known. Brisbane Brick, in particular, the Newmarket brickworks, provided bricks for buildings within the University of Queensland, including residential colleges and the MLC building on the corner of George and Adelaide Streets.

The place demonstrates rare, uncommon or endangered aspects of Queensland's cultural heritage.

The Newmarket Brickworks Chimney is significant as a rare, surviving example of the brick manufacturing industry in Brisbane, and Queensland, in the early part of the 20th century. At this time, brick makers often struggled for patronage in a state which, predominantly, utilised timber in building construction. In 1987, when the Newmarket Brickworks was demolished, the chimney was excluded from the demolition permit on the basis of its rarity as a remaining example in Brisbane of a load-bearing brick chimney stack.

The place is important because of its aesthetic significance.

At a height of over 50 metres (160 ft), clearly visible from Newmarket Road, Mina Parade and surrounding areas, the Newmarket Brickworks Chimney is significant as a well known Brisbane landmark, recognised by both local and wider communities.

The place has a strong or special association with a particular community or cultural group for social, cultural or spiritual reasons.

At a height of over 50 metres (160 ft), clearly visible from Newmarket Road, Mina Parade and surrounding areas, the Newmarket Brickworks Chimney is significant as a well-known Brisbane landmark, recognised by both local and wider communities.
