= Enoggera Road =

Major road in Brisbane

Coordinates: 27°26′06.89″S 153°00′22.24″E

Enoggera Road Queensland
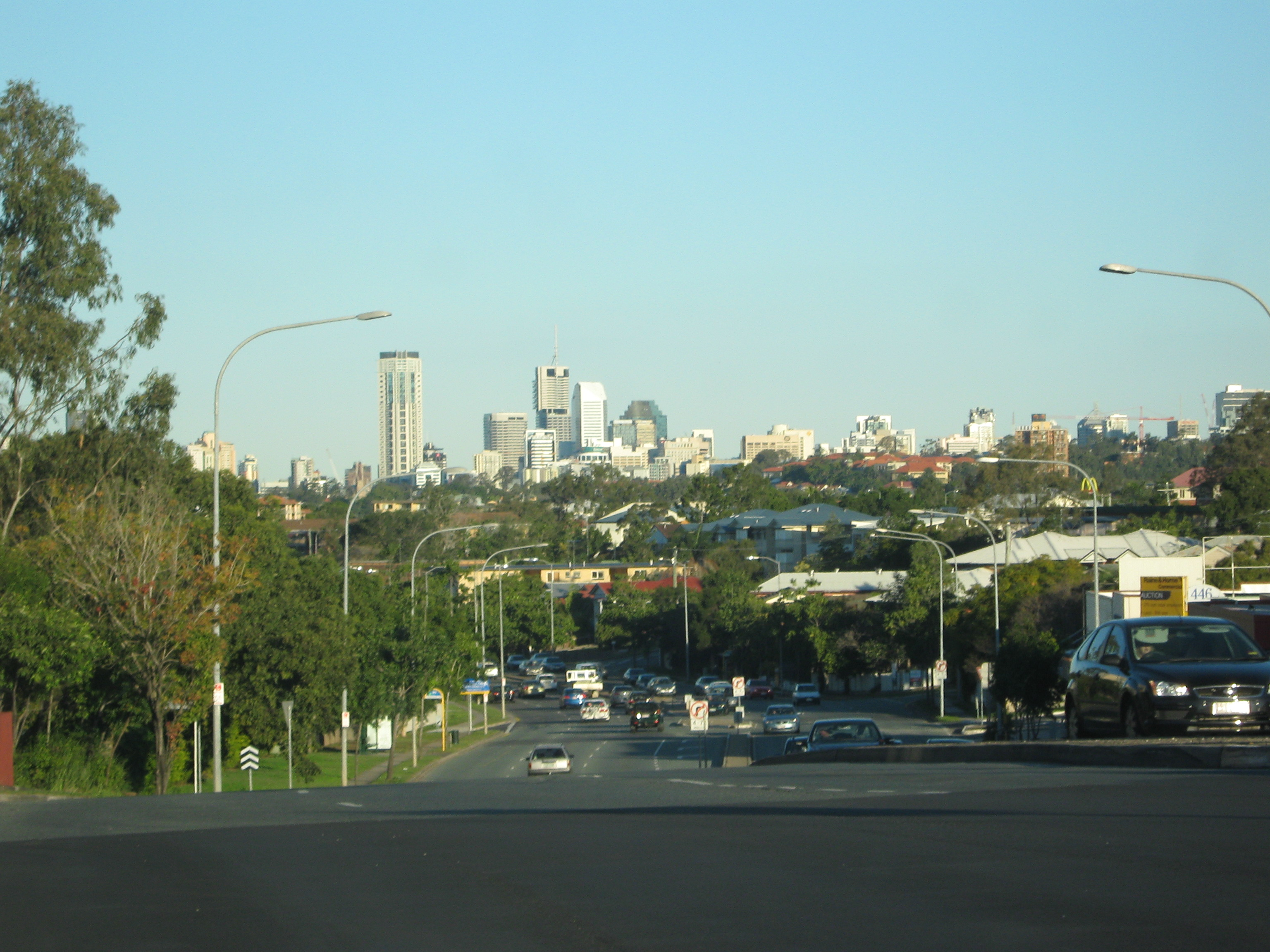
- Enoggera Road at Alderley, 2008

General information
- Type: Road
- Length: 2.1 km (1.3 mi)

Major junctions
- Northwest end: Samford Road (State Route 22), Alderley
- Southeast end: Kelvin Grove Road Kelvin Grove

Location(s)
- Major suburbs: Alderley, Newmarket

Enoggera Road is a major road in Brisbane, Queensland, Australia. It is the main access road that connects the north-west Brisbane suburbs to Enoggera Creek towards the inner suburbs and the Brisbane CBD.

The road is commonly used by commuters travelling to and from outskirt suburbs such as Mitchelton, Ferny Grove and Samford.

== Major intersections ==
The entire road is in the Brisbane local government area.

| Location | km | mi | Destinations | Notes |
|---|---|---|---|---|
| Alderley | 0 | 0.0 | Samford Road (State Route 22) runs west to Enoggera / South Pine Road runs north to Enoggera | Northern end of Enoggera Road (no route number) |
| Alderley–Newmarket boundary | 0.65 | 0.40 | Alderson Street runs east through Newmarket | |
| Newmarket | 0.85 | 0.53 | Banks Street runs west to Alderley | |
| Newmarket | 1.4 | 0.87 | Newmarket Road runs east to Wilston | |
| Newmarket | 1.6 | 0.99 | Ashgrove Avenue runs west to Ashgrove; Edmonstone Street runs east to Wilston | |
| Newmarket–Kelvin Grove boundary | 2.1 | 1.3 | Bridge over Enoggera Creek | End of Enoggera Road. Continues south as Kelvin Grove Road. |
1.000 mi = 1.609 km; 1.000 km = 0.621 mi

== Amenities ==
Enoggera Road is home to the Newmarket Village Shopping Centre, which includes the Reading Cinema complex, one of the first north-side Brisbane McDonald's located at Newmarket and the Newmarket public pool located at Alderley.

== See also ==
- Road transport in Brisbane
