= Railways in South East Queensland =

Train service in Australia

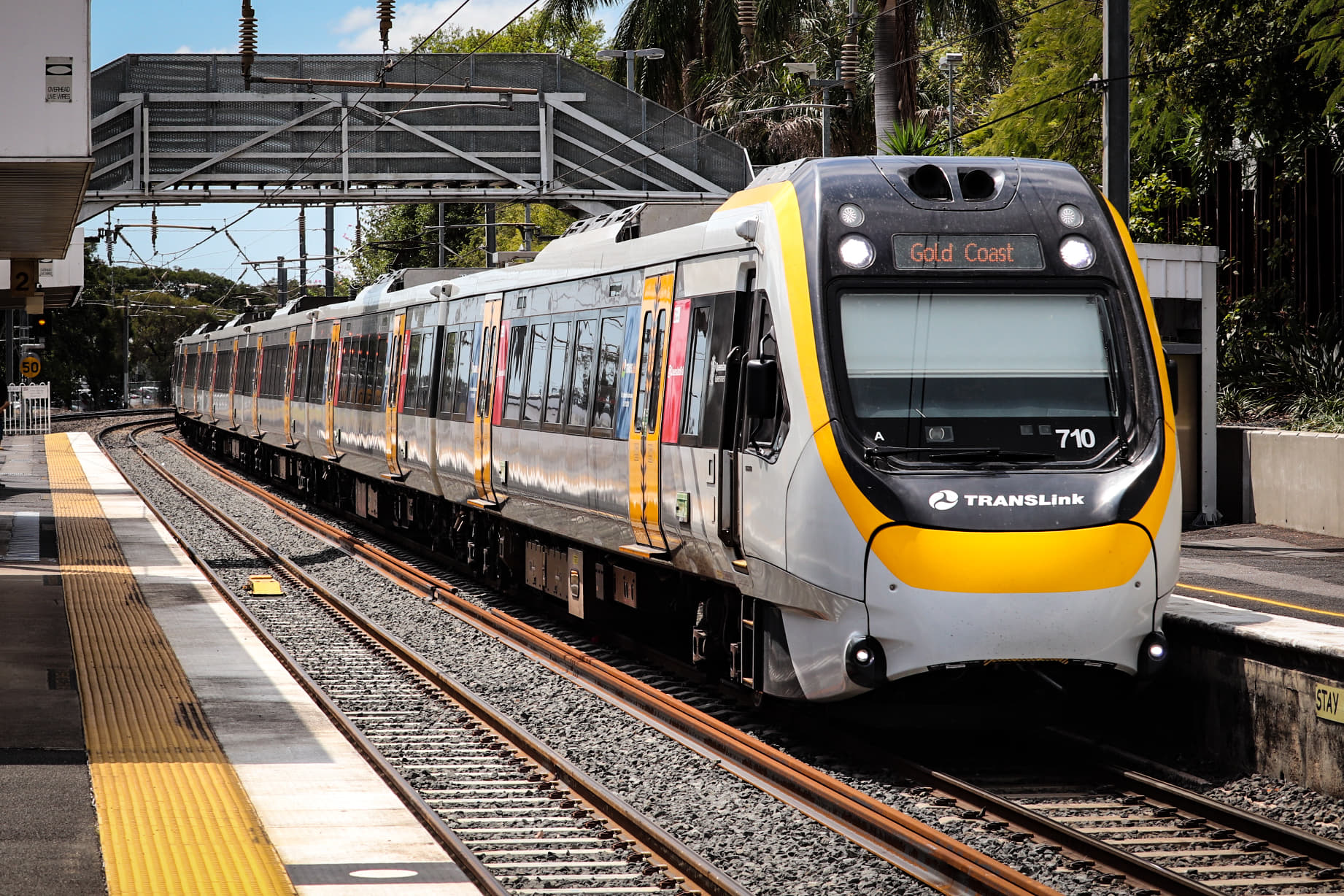
- NGR 710 at Yeronga in 2018

Overview
- Owner: Queensland Rail
- Area served: South East Queensland
- Locale: Brisbane
- Transit type: Suburban rail
- Number of lines: 12
- Number of stations: 154
- Annual ridership: 42.86 million (FY22/23)
- Chief executive: Katarzyna Stapleton
- Headquarters: Brisbane
- Website: queenslandrail.com.au

Operation
- Began operation: 1865
- Operator: Queensland Rail

Technical
- System length: 689 km (428 mi)
- Track gauge: 1,067 mm (3 ft 6 in)
- Electrification: 25 kV 50 Hz AC overhead lines
- Top speed: 140 km/h (87 mph)

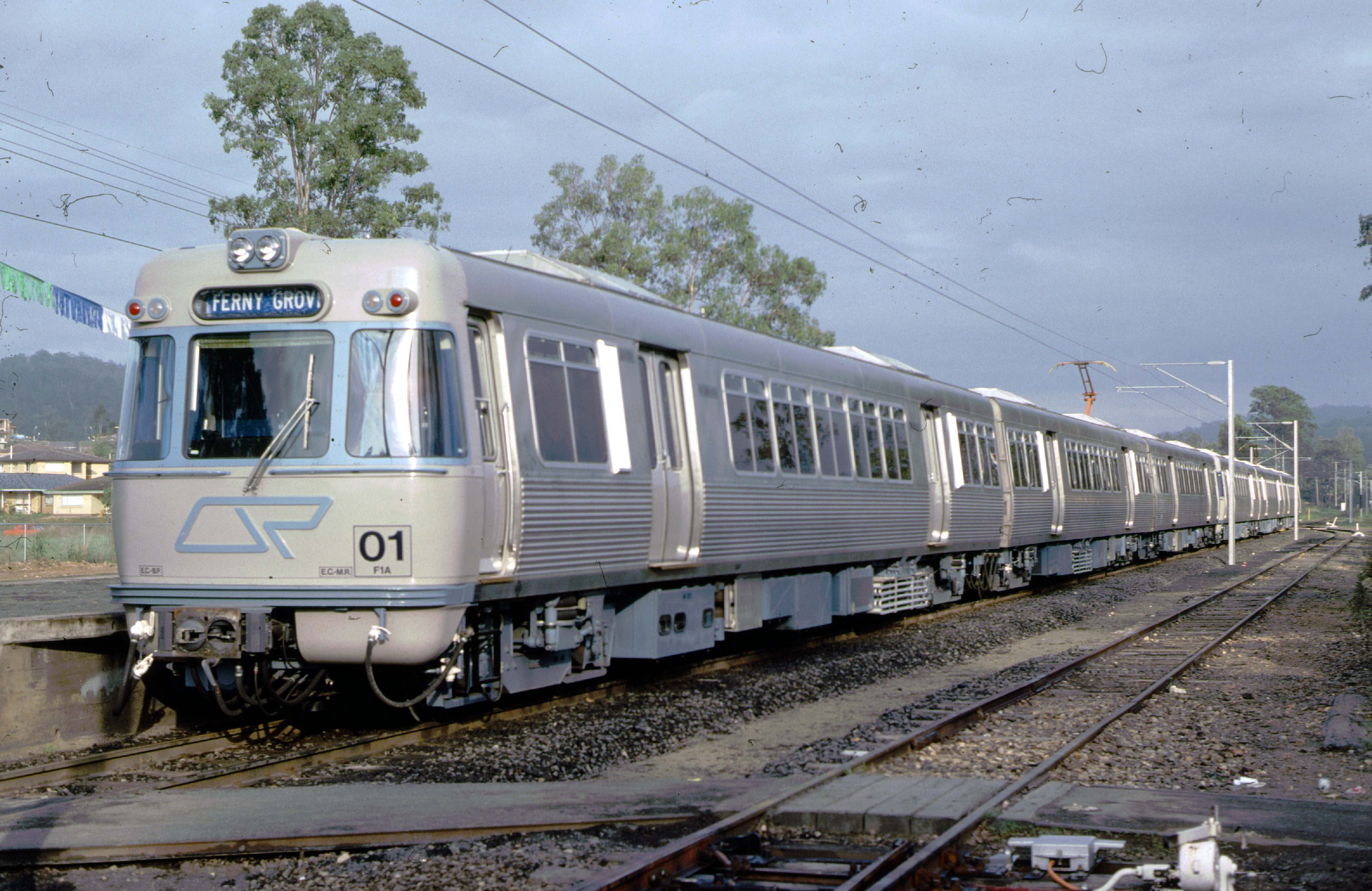
Queensland Rail's Electric Multiple Units served South East Queensland from their introduction in 1979 until their retirement in 2025. Pictured here is EMU 01. EMU 01 was withdrawn in 2019.

Railways in South East Queensland consist of a large passenger and freight rail network centred on Brisbane, the capital city of the Australian state of Queensland. Suburban and interurban passenger rail services are operated by Queensland Rail, which also operates long-distance services connecting Brisbane to the rest of the state. Aurizon and Pacific National are private companies which operate freight services. The passenger rail network in South East Queensland is known as the Citytrain network.

Queensland Rail operates ten suburban and two interurban lines in South East Queensland, all of which are electrified. Centred in the Brisbane central business district, the network extends as far as Gympie, Varsity Lakes on the Gold Coast, Rosewood in Ipswich, and Cleveland in the Redlands.

Each line is ascribed a colour, name and number on all Queensland Rail signage, timetables, posters and maps. There are 154 stations on the South-East Queensland rail network. Services and ticketing are co-ordinated by the Queensland Government agency Translink.

Queensland Rail's trains had 42.86 million boardings in the 2022–23 financial year, giving the SEQ rail network the fourth highest patronage out of Australia's suburban rail networks, behind that of Sydney, Melbourne and Perth.

== History ==
=== Construction ===
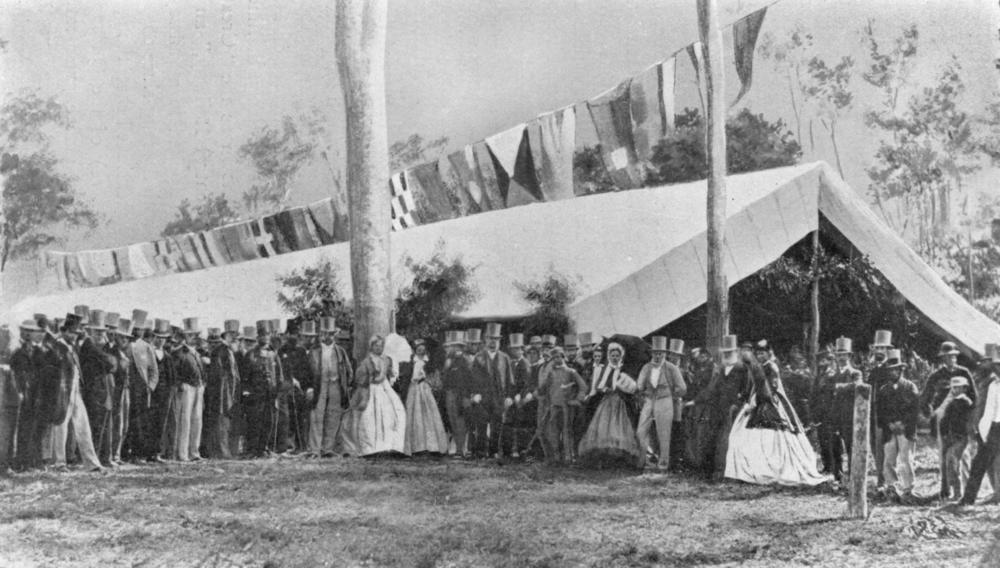
Official opening of the first section from Ipswich to Grandchester, 1865

The first railway in Queensland did not actually run to Brisbane, but ran from Ipswich to Grandchester. Opened in July 1865, the line into Brisbane was not completed until the opening of the Albert Bridge in July 1875. Branch lines in the city itself did not start until the next decade, with the branch line to Sandgate opened in May 1882, and the branch from Eagle Junction to Racecourse in September the same year.

Lines were opened from Brisbane to Sandgate and Ascot in 1882. The first section of the North Coast line opened to Petrie in 1888. In 1891 this line was connected to the Maryborough line at Gympie, creating a through line to Mount Perry. A branch line was built from Caboolture to Woodford in 1909 and Kilcoy in 1913, now closed. A branch line was opened from Monkland (south of Gympie) to Brooloo in 1915. A line was opened from the first South Brisbane station at Stanley Street, Woolloongabba to Beenleigh in 1885, and extended to Southport in 1889 and Tweed Heads, New South Wales in 1903. This line was closed beyond Beenleigh in 1964.

A branch line was completed between Boggo Road station and Cleveland in 1889, although the section beyond Lota station was closed and since reconstructed. A new South Brisbane station was built on Melbourne Street in 1891. This became the terminus of the standard gauge line from Grafton in 1930 and Sydney in 1932. A dual gauge line was built from South Brisbane over the Brisbane River to Roma Street in 1978. A line was opened in 1980 from a junction near Lindum station on the Cleveland line to the Port of Brisbane at Fisherman's Island. This was converted to dual 1435/1067 mm gauge and extended in parallel with the duplicated passenger line to Dutton Park in about 1995 under the Keating government's One Nation program.

The Beaudesert line was opened between Bethania and Beaudesert in 1888, and closed in 1996. The Canungra line was completed to Canungra in 1915, now closed. The line from extended from Roma Street to Central stations in 1889, and to Brunswick Street station in 1890. The Ferny Grove line was opened from a junction at Mayne to Enoggera in 1899. The short Laidley Valley railway lines opened on 19 April 1911 but was never profitable.

=== Electrification ===
A start on electrification of the suburban network was approved in 1950 but a change of state government in 1957 saw the scheme abandoned in 1959. It was not until the 1970s that electrification was again brought up, with contracts let in 1975. The first part of the new electric system from Darra to Ferny Grove opened on 17 November 1979. The network was completed by 1988, with a number of extensions made since and additional rolling stock purchased. Services were initially operated under the Queensland Rail brand, with the Citytrain name established in 1995.

=== Duplication ===
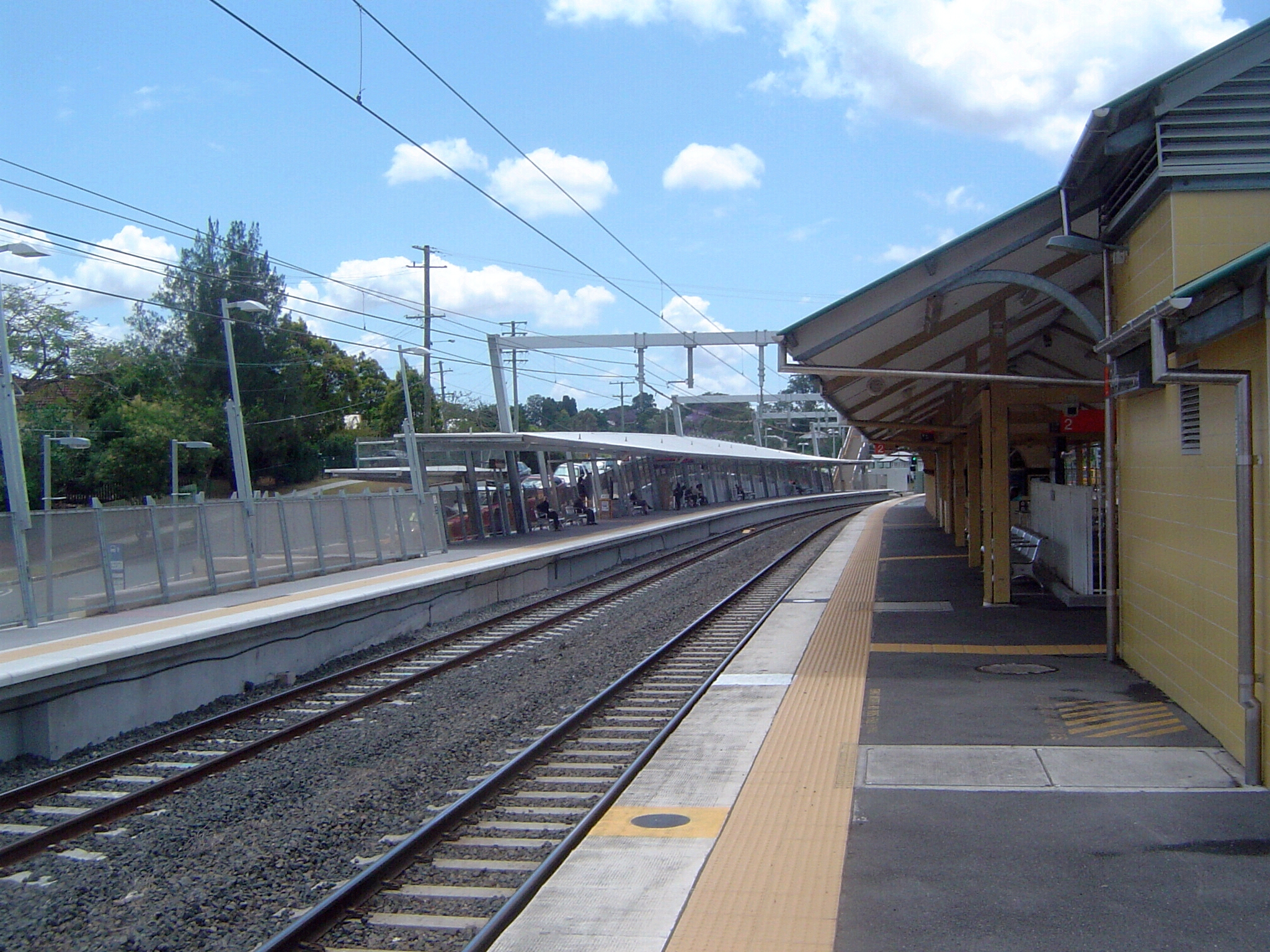
Oxley station's new platform and track (left)

To increase the capacity on a number of lines, the rail network in Brisbane has required some tracks to be duplicated. In June 2004, Queensland Government announced rail duplication of the Gold Coast line between Ormeau and Coomera stations. Between 2008 and 2010, work was carried out to duplicate the tracks between Darra and Corinda stations. Work included a link to the Springfield line and upgrades to Oxley and Darra stations. In 2010, funding was allocated for the duplication of the rail line between Keperra to Ferny Grove.

=== Increased capacity ===
==== Beenleigh line ====
A third track was laid between Salisbury and Kuraby stations, a length of 9.5 km (5.9 mi). Previously two tracks, the added capacity allows Varsity Lakes line services to operate with less chance of delays. Seven railway stations along the section were significantly upgraded. The project was commissioned on 2 March 2008.

==== Ferny Grove line ====
A second track was laid between Mitchelton and Keperra railway station, including an upgrade to the intermediate stations, Oxford Park and Grovely. Upgraded with two platforms, this upgrade allows additional services to operate on the line during peak hour, and will also remove waiting times outbound from Mitchelton and inbound from Keperra. Other improvements include lifts and footbridges, to meet the Disability Standards for Accessible Public Transport, and new, modern station buildings. The further duplication of the railway between Keperra and Ferny Grove stations, plus an additional platform and parking at Ferny Grove has been completed.

==== Ipswich/Rosewood line ====
5.2 km (3.2 mi) of track between Corinda and Darra stations was quadruplicated. Previously four tracks to Corinda then two to Ipswich, the quadruplication allowed for greater capacity, especially with the Springfield Central railway line branching from Darra station.

==== Nambour/Gympie North line ====
13.7 km (8.5 mi) of track north of Caboolture station to Beerburrum station has been duplicated and re-aligned, along with the construction of stations at Elimbah and Beerburrum. Construction work began in 2007, and the project was commissioned on 14 April 2009.

An additional 17 km (11 mi) of track between Beerburrum and Landsborough will be similarly duplicated and re-aligned. This project commenced in 2020.

==== Varsity Lakes line ====
The line between Ormeau and Coomera stations, 6.7 km (4.2 mi) in length, was duplicated in October 2006, allowing for additional capacity. Similarly, the 16.6 km (10.3 mi) length between Helensvale and Robina stations was duplicated in July 2008, removing the need for a four-minute layover at Helensvale for Robina services to wait for the Brisbane service due to the single track either side of the station.

=== Recent extensions ===
==== Brisbane Airport line ====
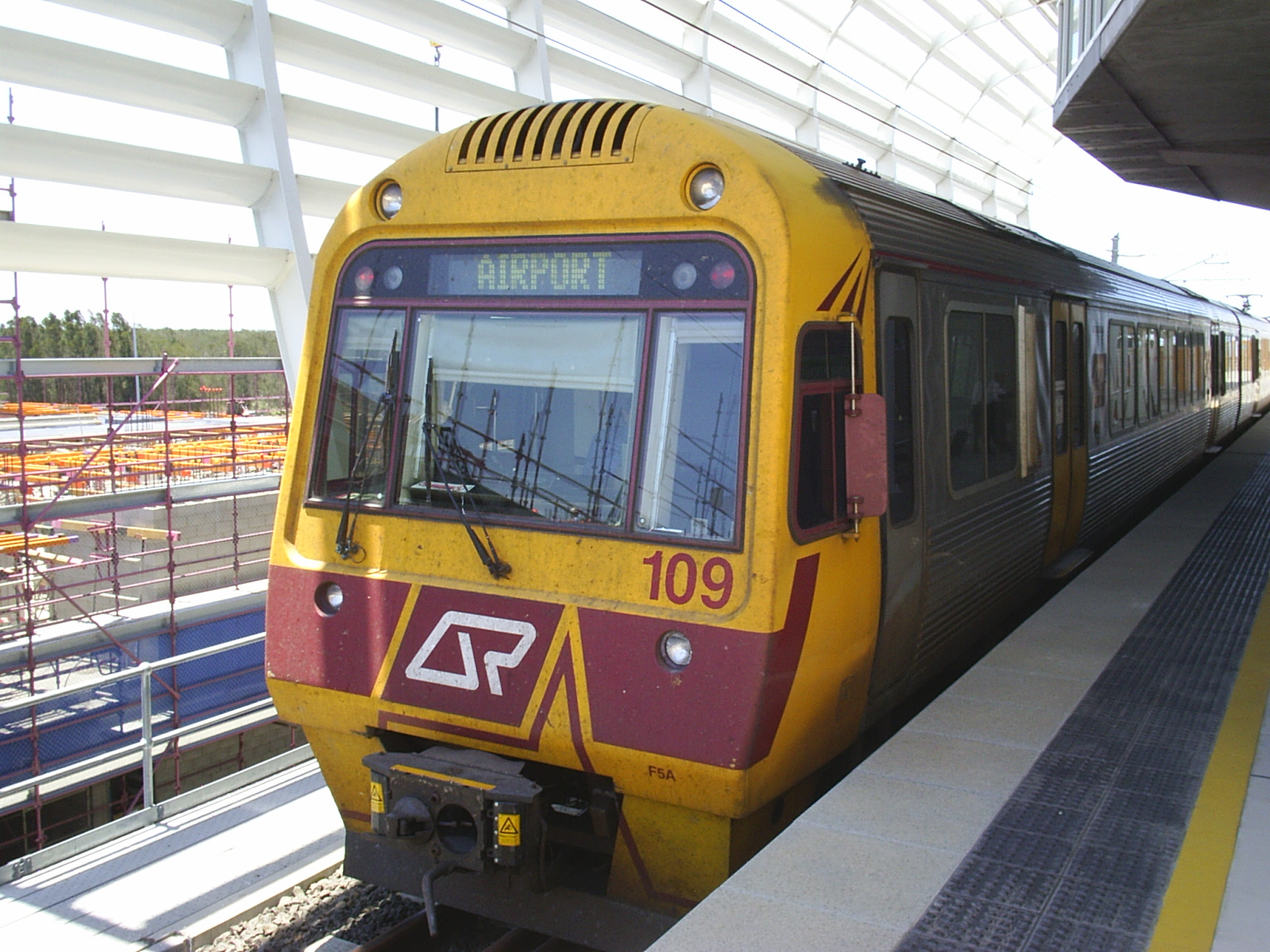
Queensland Rail IMU109 at International Airport station

The Brisbane Airport rail line opened to passengers in May 2001. Under a BOOT scheme – build, own, operate and transfer – the Queensland Government licensed Airtrain Citylink to build the rail line, to own and operate it, and hand the entire infrastructure over to the Queensland Government after 35 years when the company will then cease to exist. Airtrain Citylink contracted Transfield Services to build, operate and maintain the line and finally Airtrain Citylink contracted Queensland Rail to provide rolling stock for the rail line.

==== Kippa-Ring line ====
The Kippa-Ring railway line (previously known as the Moreton Bay Rail link) is a suburban railway line extending 27.5 km (17.1 mi) north-northwest from Brisbane central business district (approximately 40.1 km (24.9 mi) from Central station. The line is part of the QR Citytrain network, branching from the existing Caboolture line immediately after Petrie railway station, and extending to Redcliffe. It was more seriously identified and anticipated in the 1970s, and the land was purchased in the 1980s although the line was not built. Construction commenced in 2013 and the line was opened to passengers on 4 October 2016.

==== Springfield Central line ====
The Springfield Central railway line is a line extending from Darra railway station on the Ipswich line to the Springfield area. The 26 km (16 mi) extension of the network had a total cost of $475 million and was completed in December 2013.

==== Varsity Lakes line ====
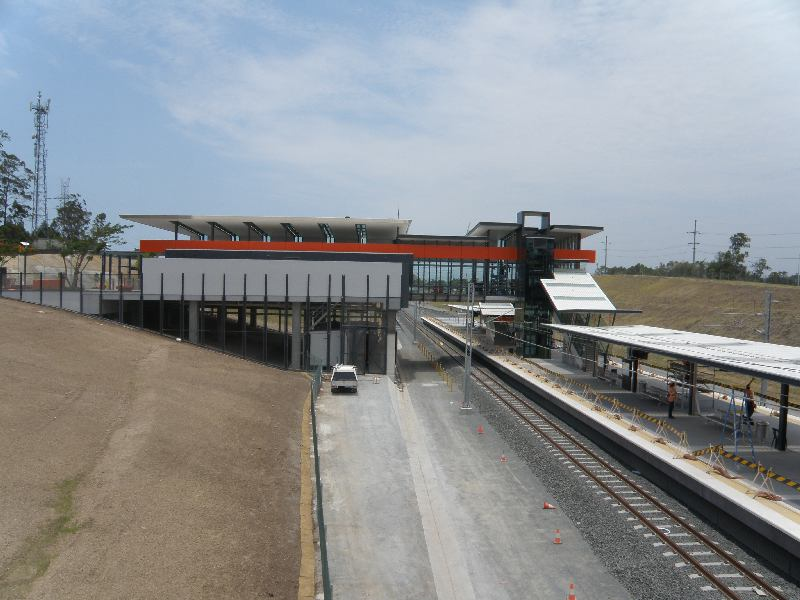
Varsity Lakes station

In July 2007, Queensland Government announced the rail extension for the Varsity Lakes line. The first stage was completed in 2009. It was later proposed to take the line to Tallebudgera but it did not proceed. This is the first stage of the proposed progressive extension of the line to the Gold Coast Airport. Further extension of the line including proposed stations at Tallebudgera, Elanora and Tugun is expected to be constructed after the completion of the Cross River Rail project.

A light rail line, G:link, on the Gold Coast opened in July 2014.

== Network ==
Queensland Rail operates twelve rail lines across South East Queensland, centred on the Brisbane central business district. Lines that share a colour connect through the central city. Note that some stations and lengths are counted multiple times on this list.

Line numbering was introduced in August 2026 to improve readability and navigation.

South East Queensland rail lines
Line	First Service	Image	Length	Stations
Caboolture line	1888 (electrified 1982–86)	Caboolture railway station, Queensland 2012	49.6 km (30.8 mi)	57
Ipswich/Rosewood line	1876 (electrified 1979–93)	East Ipswich station, 2012	57 km (35 mi)	57
Nambour/Gympie North line	1881 (Electrified 1988)	Landsborough station platform, Queensland 2012	180 km (110 mi)	57
Kippa-Ring line	2016	Mango Hill station, Brisbane 2017	12 km (7.5 mi)	35
Springfield Central line	2013	Springfield Central station, Brisbane 2013	13.6 km (8.5 mi)	35
Doomben line	1882 (electrified 1988)	Doomben station, 2012	8 km (5.0 mi)	11
Cleveland line	1888 (electrified 1982–88)	Cleveland station, Brisbane	37.3 km (23.2 mi)	39
Shorncliffe line	1882 (electrified 1982)	Shorncliffe station platform, Brisbane	11 km (6.8 mi)	39
Brisbane Airport line	2001	Brisbane Airport rail line	15.9 km (9.9 mi)	24
Varsity Lakes line	1996	Varsity Lakes station, 2016	89.4 km (55.6 mi)	24
Beenleigh line	1881 (electrified 1982–84)	QR SMU 239 arriving at South Brisbane railway station on a Beenleigh line	41.5 km (25.8 mi)	40
Ferny Grove line	1899 (electrified 1979)	Grovely station, Brisbane	13.5 km (8.4 mi)	40

Additionally, Translink operates several bus routes along corridors on behalf of Queensland Rail where the railway line has been closed to passenger traffic or supplements low-patronage lines at specific times of the day. To relieve congestion on the single track North Coast line north of Beerburrum, the rail service is supplemented by a bus service operated by Kangaroo Bus Lines on weekdays between Caboolture and Nambour as route 649.

== Stations ==
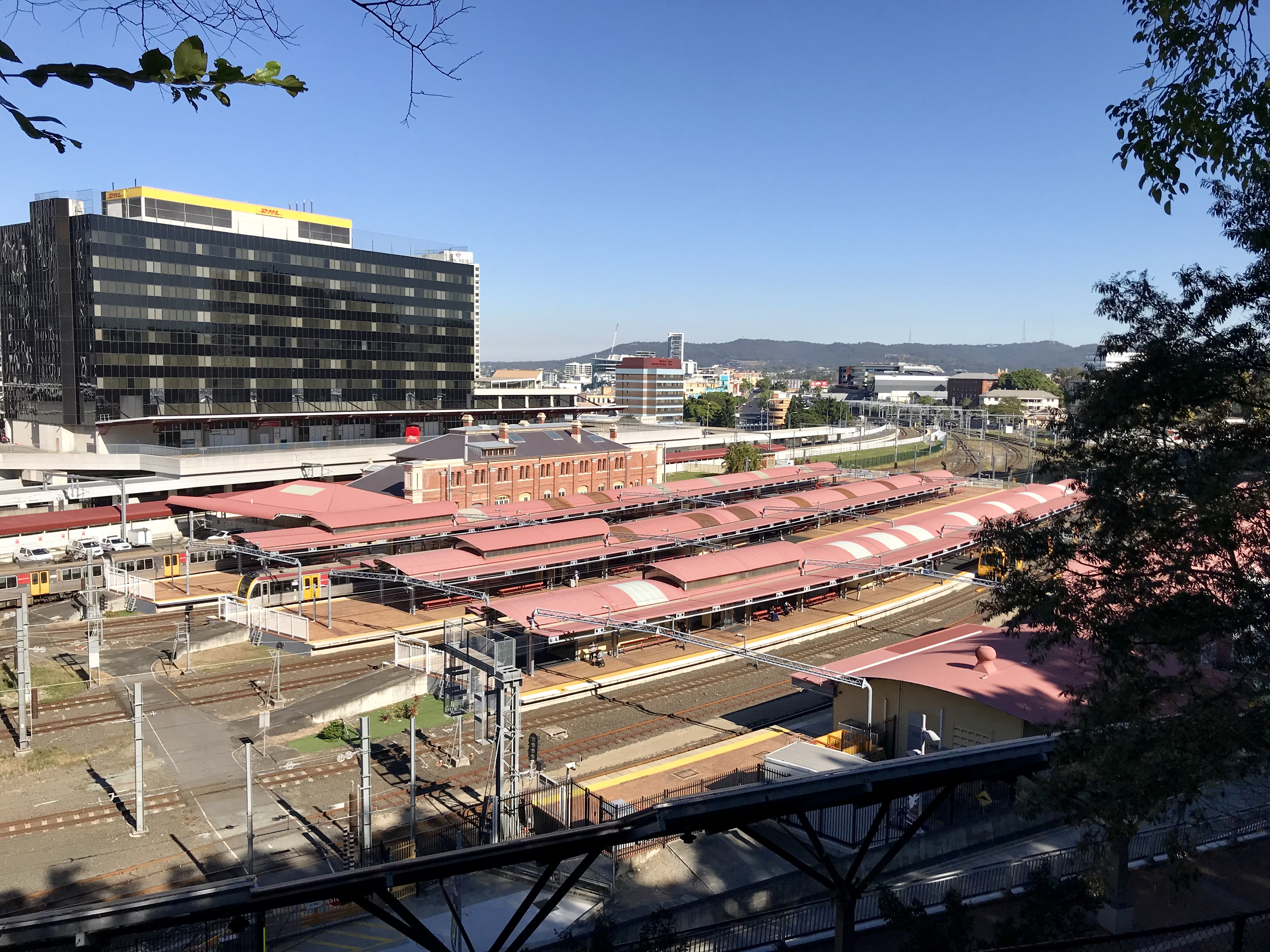
Platforms at Roma Street railway station in central Brisbane

There are 154 stations on the South East Queensland rail network. The four Brisbane city stations — Roma Street, Brisbane Central, Fortitude Valley and Bowen Hills — are served by all suburban and interurban lines and together form the core of the network.

== Fares and tickets ==
Translink is responsible for the rail network's fares and tickets. The agency facilitates integrated ticketing with public transport throughout South East Queensland using the go card. Passengers must touch the card on a card reader at the start and finish of each journey, and when transferring between services.

== Operators ==
=== Passenger ===
Suburban and interurban passenger services are operated under the Citytrain brand of Queensland Rail, and are co-ordinated by Translink. Long-distance passenger services operate from Roma Street around the state under the Traveltrain brand, while an interstate service to Sydney is operated by New South Wales operator NSW TrainLink using its XPT fleet.

In a city with a population of 2 million, passenger traffic on the suburban network doubled in the 10 years from 1979 to 1989 to reach 50 million journeys a year in 1989, and by 1992 it had increased by another 10%.

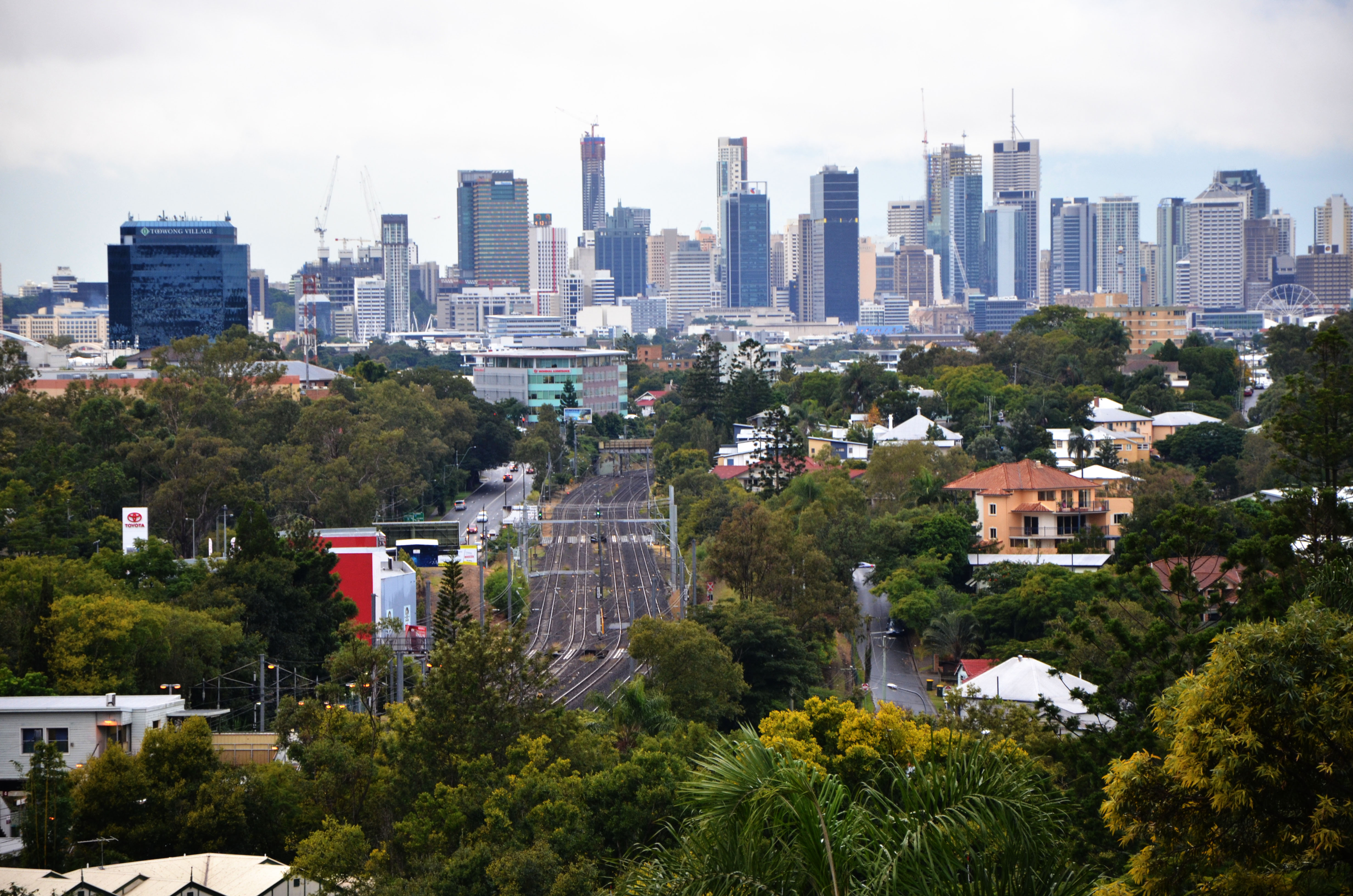
Ipswich line between Taringa and Toowong

In June 2009 as part the split of Queensland Rail's commuter rail and the freight business, The Citytrain brand was dropped in favour of using the redesigned Queensland Rail brand. Since then most traces of the Citytrain brand have been removed from rolling stock and station signage.

On 8 March 2017, the Queensland Government released a report called "Fixing the trains: a high-level implementation plan to transform rail in Queensland" This report officially resurrected the Citytrain network naming for the first time since the split. Since this report, the Citytrain brand has slowly made its way back into reports. This brand re-emergence does not seem to be a controlled and deliberate action, but rather appeared in the report due to the Citytrain brand being well known amongst many within the Brisbane area. The report unofficially initiated a return of the Citytrain branding, and established the Citytrain Response Unit to respond to the plan.

The station announcements on passenger trains are voiced by voiceover artist Ross Newth.

=== Freight ===
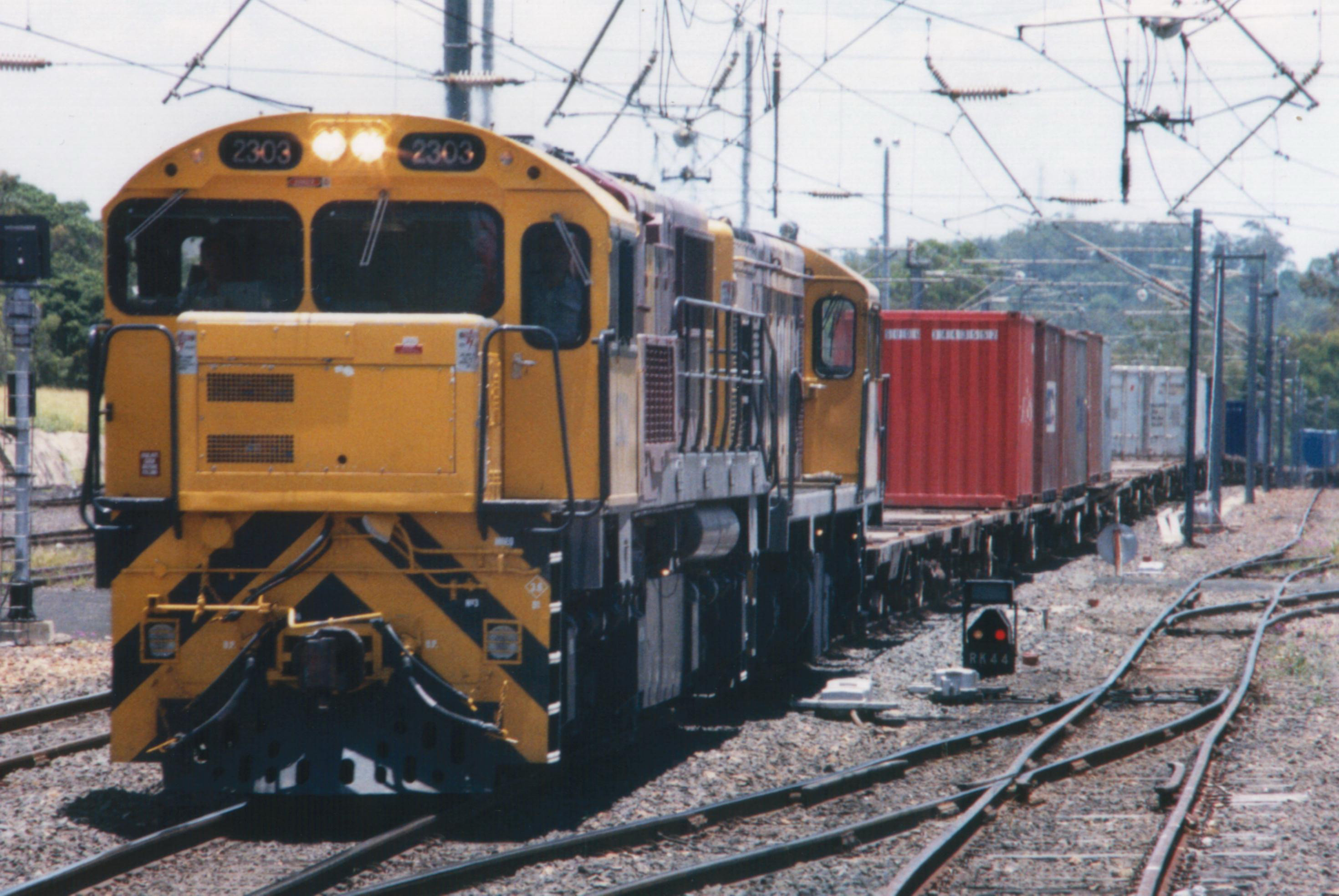
2300 class on a freight service at Redbank station

Aurizon operates the majority of freight services on both the 1,435 mm (4 ft 8 1/2 in) standard and 1,067 mm (3 ft 6 in) narrow gauges, with Pacific National on the standard gauge and their narrow gauge Pacific National Queensland division also operating services.

The main rail freight terminal is in the southern Brisbane suburb of Acacia Ridge, located off the Beenleigh suburban line at the northern end of the line from New South Wales. A freight line was opened from Acacia Ridge to Fishermans Island and the Port of Brisbane in 1980, running alongside the Beenleigh line from Salisbury to Dutton Park, then follows the Cleveland line to Lindum. Dual gauge access on the line was promised by the Federal Fraser government in 1983, but it was not until 1997 that the work was carried out, eliminating the break-of-gauge and enabling trains to run direct from the port across the New South Wales border.

Approximately four million tonnes of freight is moved from outside South East Queensland to points within it; 1.1 million tonnes was to interstate destinations. One of the largest internal traffic flows is the movement of coal along the Western Line to the Swanbank Power Station and the Port of Brisbane.

The Fisherman Islands intermodal terminal was opened in 1994. Other rail freight terminals have been located at South Brisbane, Boggo Road, Yeerongpilly, Clapham, and Salisbury.

== Rolling stock ==
All of the Queensland Rail City Network rolling stock is electric and air conditioned.

- Suburban Multiple Unit (SMU)
  - 200 Series (SMU200) – 12 in service (12 built)
  - 220 Series (SMU220) – 30 in service (30 built)
  - 260 Series (SMU260) – 36 in service (36 built)
- Interurban Multiple Unit (IMU)
  - 100 Series (IMU100) – 10 in service (10 built)
  - 120 Series (IMU120) – 4 in service (4 built)
  - 160 Series (IMU160) – 28 in service (28 built)
- New Generation Rollingstock (NGR)
  - 700 Series – 75 in service
- Queensland Train Manufacturing Program (QTMP)
  - XXX Series – 65 to be manufactured by Downer/Hyundai Rotem

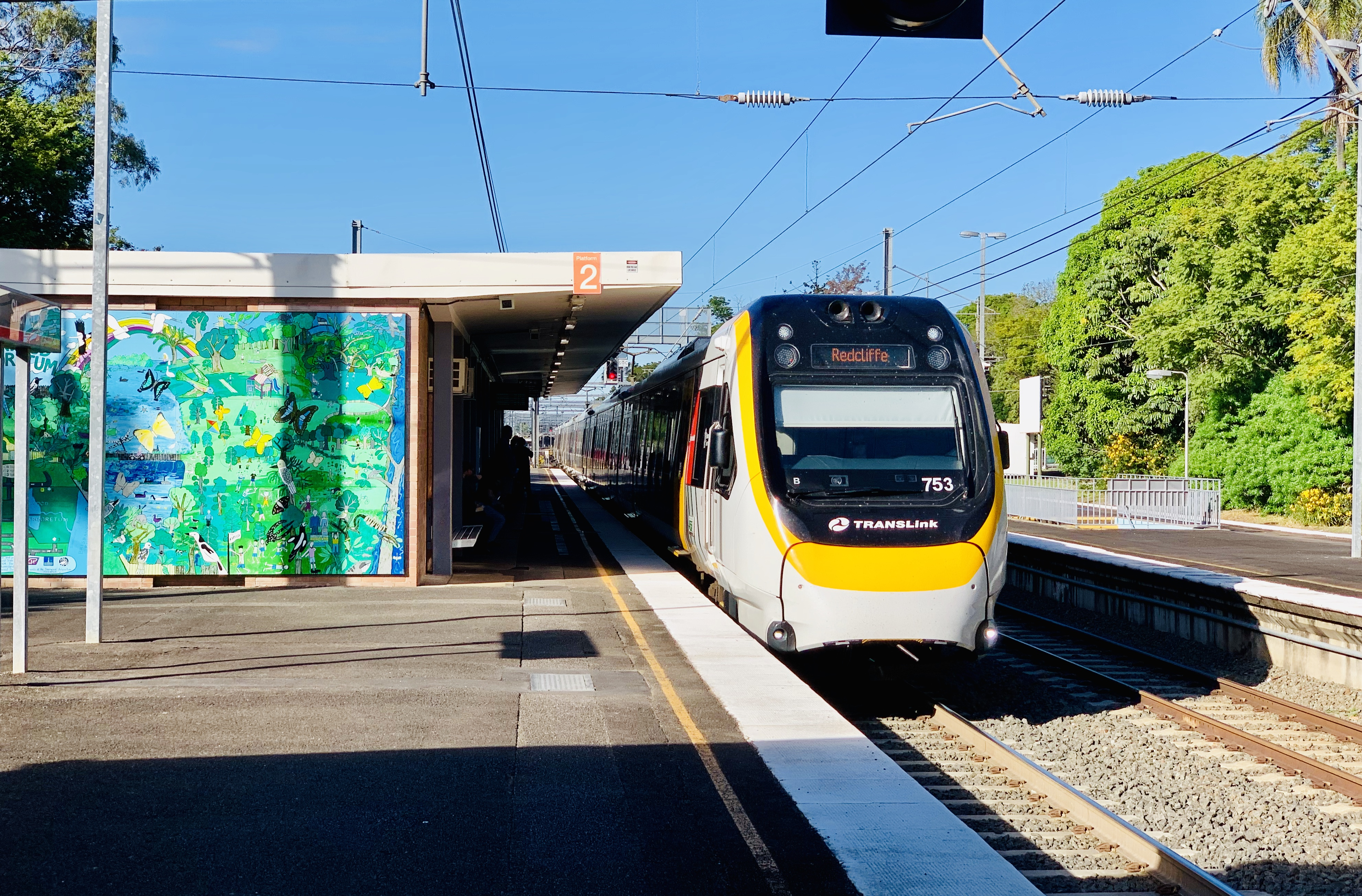
New Generation Rollingstock (NGR) set 753 at Sherwood Station

All trains are electric multiple units with a driver cabin at both ends.

Suburban trains are occasionally scheduled on interurban lines if other rolling stock is not available. While using suburban trains on interurban lines increases operational flexibility, the trains are not provided with toilets or high-backed seats.

75 new six-car New Generation Rollingstock trains were ordered in early 2014 and were delivered between late 2015 and late 2019. A new maintenance facility for these trains was built at Wulkuraka. The first NGR entered service on 11 December 2017.

20 new six-car Queensland Train Manufacturing Program trains were ordered in early 2020, with TMR considering ordering an additional 45 trains in the next decade.

== Future lines ==
A number of upgrades and extensions are under construction or planned for the rail network in South East Queensland. In 2011, the Queensland Government released a major transport plan Connecting SEQ 2031, which aimed to double public transport usage in South East Queensland. It proposed a number of service upgrades and rail extensions, including Cross River Rail, the Gold Coast light rail, a new high frequency Brisbane subway in the central city from Toowong to Bowen Hills, and a new North-west rail line branching from Cross River Rail at Alderley to Strathpine.

=== Cross River Rail ===
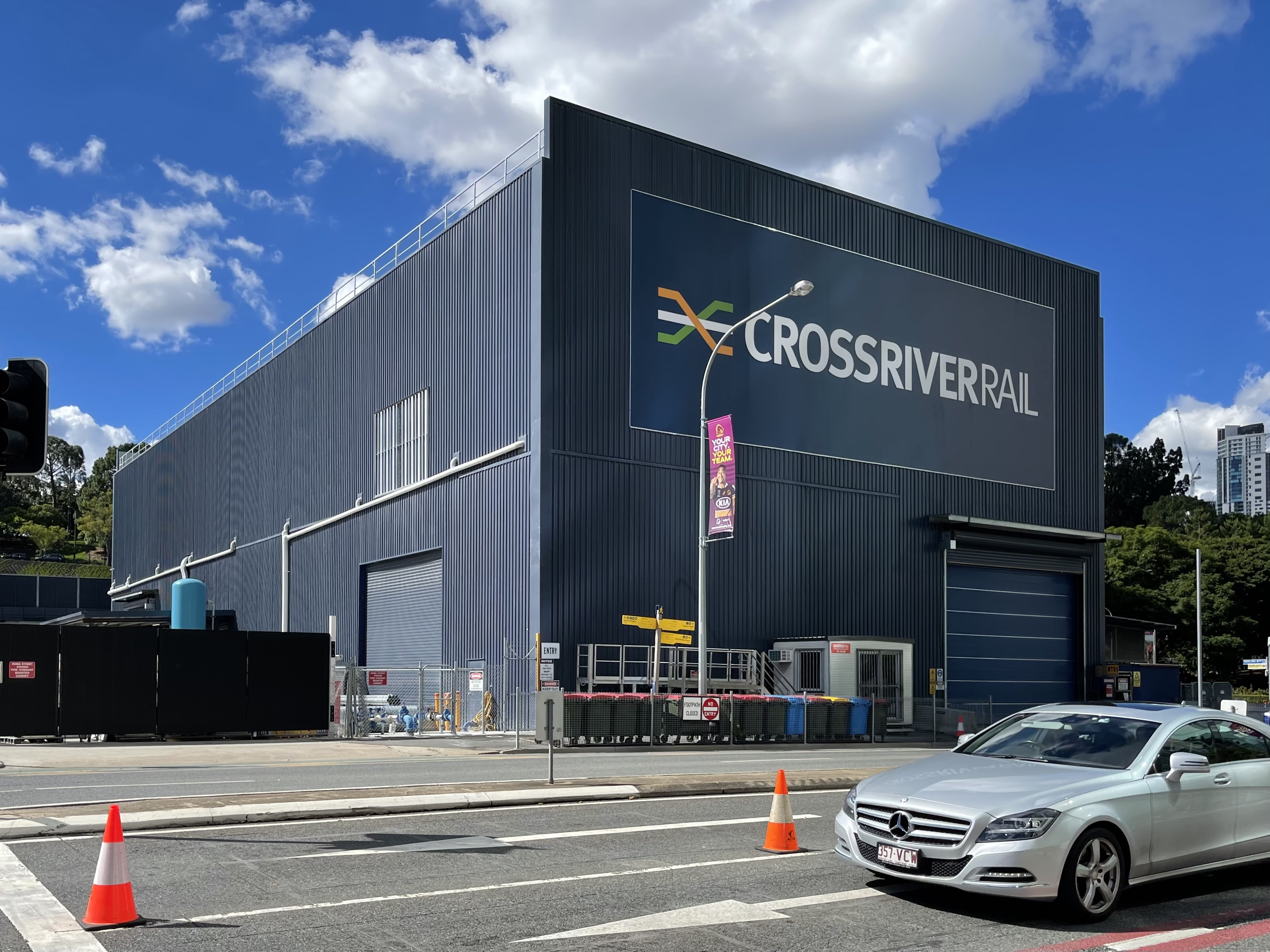
Construction site of Cross River Rail at Roma Street station in central Brisbane in 2021

On 26 August 2007, the then-Minister for Transport and Main Roads, Paul Lucas, announced the Inner City Rail Capacity Study to look at underground rail access under the Brisbane central business district. Dismissing a City Loop-style scenario similar to Melbourne, citing the relatively small size of the CBD and "technical and operational constraints", Lucas imagined an underground line from Boggo Road station to Woolloongabba, then across the Brisbane River to connect with the Exhibition railway line, with major new stations at Woolloongabba, Gardens Point/Queensland University of Technology, and in the CBD. The study also investigated the feasibility of the Exhibition line operating all year with new stations, and the upgrading of existing lines with additional tracks. Lucas allocated A$5 million to the study and appointed Aecom and Parsons Brinckerhoff as consultants to "look at options for boosting rail capacity in the city centre, including potential for an underground tunnel".

This project, Cross River Rail, is now under construction and scheduled to open to the public in early 2026.

In 2017, work began on a second rail river crossing for Brisbane as the Merivale Bridge nears capacity. The project includes just under six kilometres of new underground rail, three new underground stations at Boggo Road, Woolloongabba and Albert Street, new underground platforms at Roma Street station, and an upgrade to the existing Exhibition station. The new inner-city route will be used by the New Generation Rollingstock.||

=== Logan and Gold Coast Faster Rail ===
Logan and Gold Coast Faster Rail is a corridor upgrade project for the Beenleigh and Gold Coast Lines. The project will quadruplicate the tracks between Kuraby and Beenleigh, upgrade six stations, relocate three others, make the entire area grade-separated, and implement ETCS Level 2 from Salisbury to Varsity Lakes.

=== The Wave ===
The Maroochydore railway line, also known as The Wave, is a new rail line from Beerwah to Birtinya. The line will service the growing southern Sunshine Coast communities, including Beerwah, Bells Creek, Caloundra, Aroona and Birtinya. The corridor is further protected from Birtinya to Maroochydore. North of Maroochydore there is allowance for a future extension to the Sunshine Coast Airport. In the south, the corridor is predominantly flat with minimal curves to provide the fastest speeds possible through open grass floodplains and the glasshouse plantation forests.

== Past lines ==
- Beaudesert line – Bethania to Beaudesert.
- Beaudesert Shire Tramway – Beaudesert to Lamington and Rathdowney, operated by the Beaudesert Shire.
- Belmont Tramway – Norman Park to Belmont, variously operated by Belmont Shire, Queensland Railways and Brisbane City Council.
- Bulimba line – Brunswick Street to Newstead.
- Canungra line – Logan Village to Canungra.
- Dayboro line – Bowen Hills to Dayboro.
- Pinkenba line – Doomben to Pinkenba.
- South Coast line – Beenleigh to Southport and Tweed Heads.
- Tennyson Line – Corinda to Yeerongpilly.
- Wooloongabba line – Dutton Park to Stanley Street and South Brisbane.
