= Grovely =

Grovely may refer to

== Places ==
- Grovely Wood, in Wiltshire, England
- Grovely, Queensland, in Australia (now known as Keperra)
  - Grovely railway station, Brisbane
- Grovely, a settlement in Brunswick County, North Carolina, USA
