= Strathern =

Strathern may refer to:

== People ==
- Alistair Strathern (born 1990), British politician
- Andrew Strathern (born 1939), British anthropologist
- Marilyn Strathern (born 1941), British anthropologist
- Paul Strathern (born 1940), British writer and academic

== Places ==
- Strathern, New Zealand, suburb of Invercargill

== Other uses ==
- Anderson Strathern

== See also ==
- Strathearn (disambiguation)
