= Queensland War Council =

The Queensland War Council (1915–1932) was established by the Queensland Government to co-ordinate Queensland's assistance to World War I soldiers and their dependents.

== History ==
The Queensland Government established the Queensland War Council on 25 September 1915. Its role was to co-ordinate the funding and initiatives for employment and settlement of returned soldiers, and for assistance to the families of those killed. Specifically, there was a concern that without a co-ordinating body, many well-intentioned but independent initiatives would emerge which would lead to "confusion, inefficiencies and overlapping".

The council's initial membership consisted of the Queensland Premier T. J. Ryan, the Minister for Public Lands John McEwan Hunter, the Minister for Railways John Adamson, the Minister for Public Instruction Herbert Hardacre, the Assistant Minister for Justice John Fihelly, the Commission for Railways Charles Barnard Evans, the Mayor of Brisbane George Down, the Mayor of South Brisbane James Davey, the President of the Chamber of Commence L.M. Bond, the President of the Chamber of Manufacturers M. Becker, and the Director of Labour Walter Russell Crampton.

Recruitment was not initially part of the role of the Queensland War Council as a separate Queensland Recruiting Committee had been created in May 1915. However, in October 1915, the Queensland Recruiting Committee become a sub-committee of the Queensland War Council. Local sub-committees of the Queensland War Council were formed in local government areas outside of Brisbane. Their role was to:

- recruit more men for reinforcements
- provide advice and assistance to the families of those soldiers killed
- provide training to disabled soldiers and assistance with artificial limbs and other aids
- compile registers of employers in their district and their willingness to employ returned servicemen
- provided assistance to returned soldiers who wished to settle as farmers in their district
- collection of funds to support such initiatives, although those funds were to be administered by the Queensland War Council

Specific areas of responsibility over time included medical care, employment, housing, education and land settlement for returned soldiers or their families.

The council was wound up on 1 November 1932.

== Anzac Cottage Trust ==
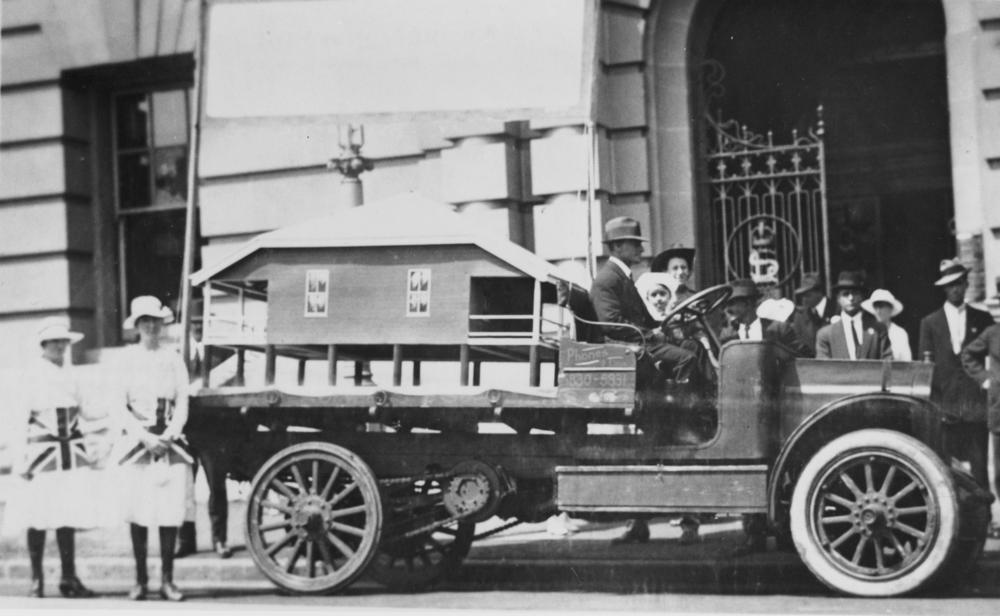
Queensland War Council Anzac Committee float on Peace Celebration Day, Brisbane, 1918

The Anzac subcommittee was established on 25 September 1915 to "secure areas of land, and make arrangements for voluntary labour to erect cottages thereon, for the homeless widows and orphans of Queensland's fallen soldiers".

The initial Anzac Cottage Trust met weekly at the Commercial Travellers Sample Rooms in Charlotte Street. The objectives of this committee were to acquire land for the erection of homes for homeless widows, or other female dependents, and descendants of deceased men who had enlisted in Queensland for military or naval service during World War I. The committee was also responsible for the nominating those who would occupy the cottage. While rental was small, 1/6 a week, the widow had to be of "good character", remain single, not be seen drinking publicly nor have male callers. She was also required to pay all the rates, any other local government charges, fire insurance and maintain the house in good order. From the outset, the land was to be vested in the Public Curator upon trust in perpetuity and the widow or female descendant was required to sign a lease with the Public Curator. The rental was intended to fund the maintenance of these cottages. An occupier could apply to this fund for assistance with maintaining their house in good repair. The Public Trustee, with agreement from the Committee, had the right to raise revenue for the repairing, maintaining and/or rebuilding of such cottages.

The conditions of tenancy for the Anzac Cottages also stated that any child, descendant or widow who married had immediately to vacate the property. They were allowed to reside or share the occupancy only with the approval of the Committee. On the death of the widow, a descendant capable of caring for the remaining family could, at the discretion of the Committee, be allowed to remain on signing of a lease. Alternately, the house could be re-let to a person who fitted the Trust's conditions and on similar terms.

The first Anzac cottage built in Queensland was at Wynnum, opened by the Governor on 12 August 1917. Many of the Anzac Cottages constructed in Queensland were funded from profits of "Golden Caskets", the Queensland lottery, numbers three, four and five. This was an initiative of Harry Coyne, chairman of the Anzac Cottage Committee, subcommittee to the Queensland War Council. The prizes awarded in these lotteries were very large. First, second and third prizes were £5,000, £1,000 and £500 respectively and the total prize pool was £10.000. Golden Casket number three went on sale on 2 March 1918 and was drawn at the Brisbane Stadium on 23 August 1918. The fourth Golden Casket sold out in less than five months and was drawn 14 May 1919, while the fifth was drawn on 13 November 1919. Harry Coyne MP, still Chairman of the Anzac Cottage Committee, was again at the Brisbane Stadium to conduct the draw and told the large crowd that profits from the three Golden Caskets would allow for between 60 and 80 homes to be built for war widows.

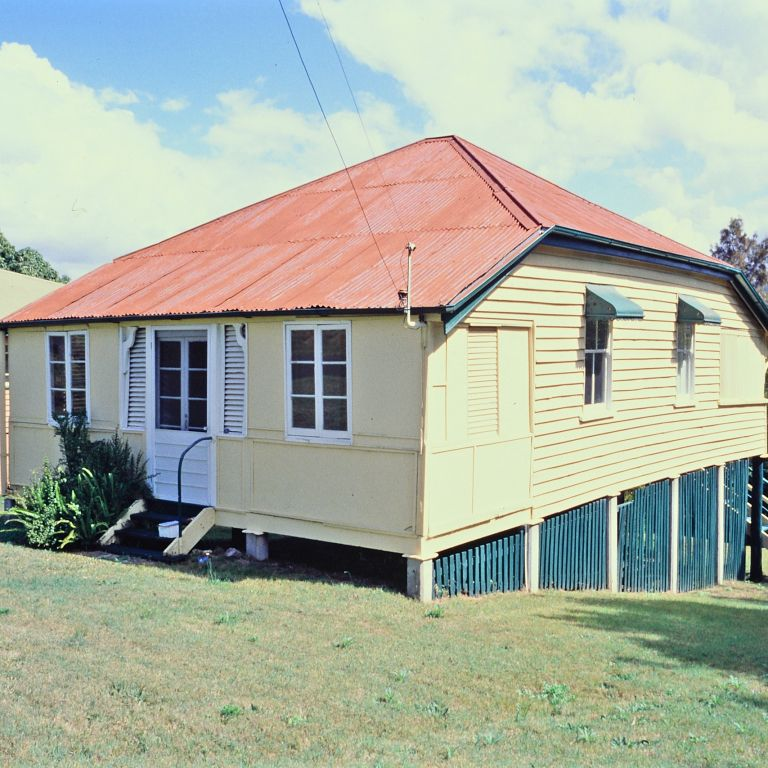
Strathearn, 1999

Thirty-eight cottages were built in Brisbane, and most had a name reflecting the Anzac theme, names such as Kitchener, Haig, Monash, Hopetown and Chauvel. The Anzac Trust Committee was disbanded in 1932 with all responsibility passing to the Public Curator (renamed Public Trustee in 1978). By 1956 the number of World War I widows and dependents requiring housing had decreased and most of the cottages were rented to non-Anzac families. Also, the maintenance fund was in financial straits so that it was suggested by the Public Curator to the Queensland Attorney General that some of the vacant dwellings be sold to fund repairs to tenanted cottages and consideration be given to winding up the Trust. The Anzac Cottages & TB Homes Act of 1960 was subsequently passed, enabling the sale of Anzac Cottages. Thirteen were sold by 6 April 1963.

By 1999, the only remaining Anzac Cottage administered by the Public Trustee was Strathearn in Alderley, Brisbane, which was sold in September 2000. Strathearn had remained an Anzac Cottage for so long because it was passed to a second generation. Originally allocated to widow Mary Ann Warner, on her death in 1955 the Trust allowed her daughter Mrs Florence Richardson Handley to continue to occupy the property as she was a widow of a World War II serviceman. Strathearn was heritage-listed in 2007 as an intact example of an Anzac Cottage.

== See also ==
- Anzac Cottage, Mount Hawthorn, Western Australia
