= Ashwin and Falconer =

Ashwin and Falconer were a stained glazing partnership in Pitt Street, Sydney, New South Wales, Australia. Their work appears in a number of heritage-listed properties.

== History ==
John Falconer was one of the earliest Sydney stained glaziers establishing his business in 1863 after his arrival in Australia from Glasgow, Scotland in 1856. He was joined by Frederick Ashwin (1833-1909) in 1875.

Frederick Ashwin was born in Birmingham, and joined the London based stained glass firm of Clayton & Bell before setting up on his own account in Bloomsbury, London. Ashwin's surviving English works include a memorial window, entitled “The Dawning of the Last Day” which he produced, in 1871, for St Barnabas's Church, Hengoed, Shropshire. It is now preserved at the Stained Glass Museum at Ely Cathedral. He also produced a representation of Charity (“Charitas”) that was displayed in London at the 1872 International Exhibition, and now held by the Victoria & Albert Museum.

Falconer and Ashwin formed a partnership around 1876 called Falconer and Ashwin, later reversed to Ashwin and Falconer. Falconer continued in practice until 1892 when Ashwin and Falconer became known as F Ashwin & Co. John Radecki joined the firm in 1885 as a trainee and continued as an employee until Ashwin's death in 1909. The business F Ashwin & Co, which had relocated from Pitt Street to 83 Commonwealth Street, was sold up in 1925.

In 1910, Radecki became chief designer for John Ashwin & Co, in partnership with Frederick Ashwin's cousin, John Ashwin, a jeweller from Birmingham who had been in business in New Zealand. Radecki was proprietor of John Ashwin & Co, which was based at 31 Dixon Street, Sydney, from John Ashwin's death in 1920 until 1954. Because of Radecki's connection with F Ashwin & Co, John Ashwin & Co sometimes claimed continuity with the earlier firm. Radecki's daughter Winifred Siedlecky continued as proprietor of the firm until the building's owners demolished the Dixon Street premises in 1961.

== Significant works ==
The company produced many outstanding windows including:

- 1877: the glazed dome in the Sydney Town Hall
- 1878: windows for St James's Catholic church, Forest Lodge, Sydney
- circa 1882: two figured panels at Farrington House in Alderley, Brisbane, Queensland (since removed from this house and in an unknown private collection)
- panels for St James' Church of England in Toowoomba, Queensland which were designed by Edmund Blacket & Son
- a window in the Wesley Uniting Church in Toowoomba
- 1905: three stained glass windows in St Andrew's Uniting Church in Brisbane (representing the Burning Bush, John Knox and John Calvin)
