= Farrington House, Alderley =

Farrington House
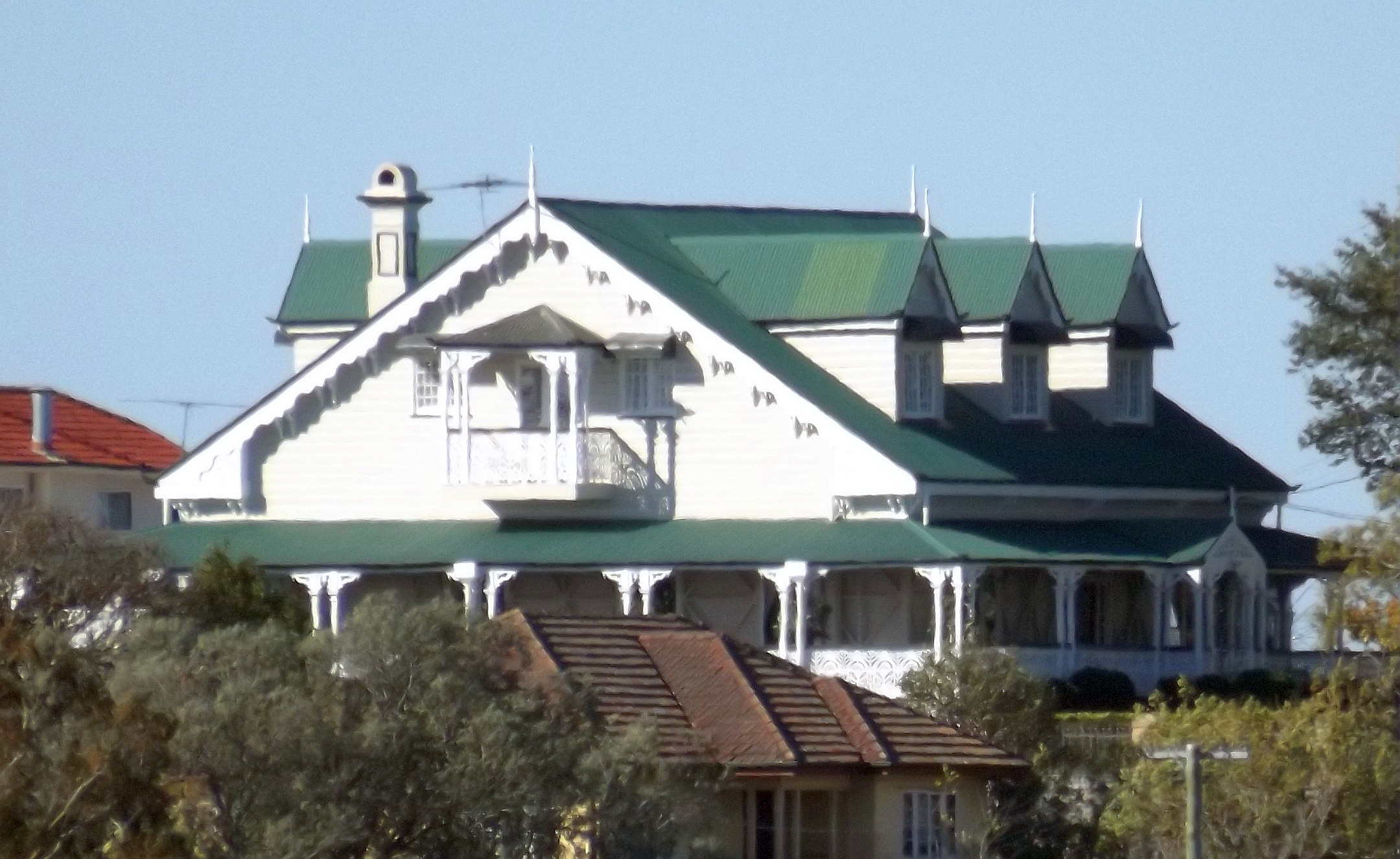
- Residence in 2015

- Location within Queensland Location within Australia
- 27.4227°S 153.0058°E
- Location: 39 David Street, Alderley, Queensland, Australia

History
- Design period: 1870s–1890s (late 19th century)
- Built: c. 1882
- Built for: Frederick Waters Wilson

Queensland Heritage Register
- Official name: Farrington House, Clifford House
- Type: state heritage (built)
- Designated: 21 October 1992
- Reference no.: 600046
- Significant period: 1880s (fabric & historical)
- Significant components: views from, views to, stained glass window/s, residential accommodation – main house, attic

Farrington House is a heritage-listed detached house at 39 David Street, Alderley, Queensland, Australia. It was built c. 1882. It is also known as Clifford House. It was added to the Queensland Heritage Register on 21 October 1992.

== History ==
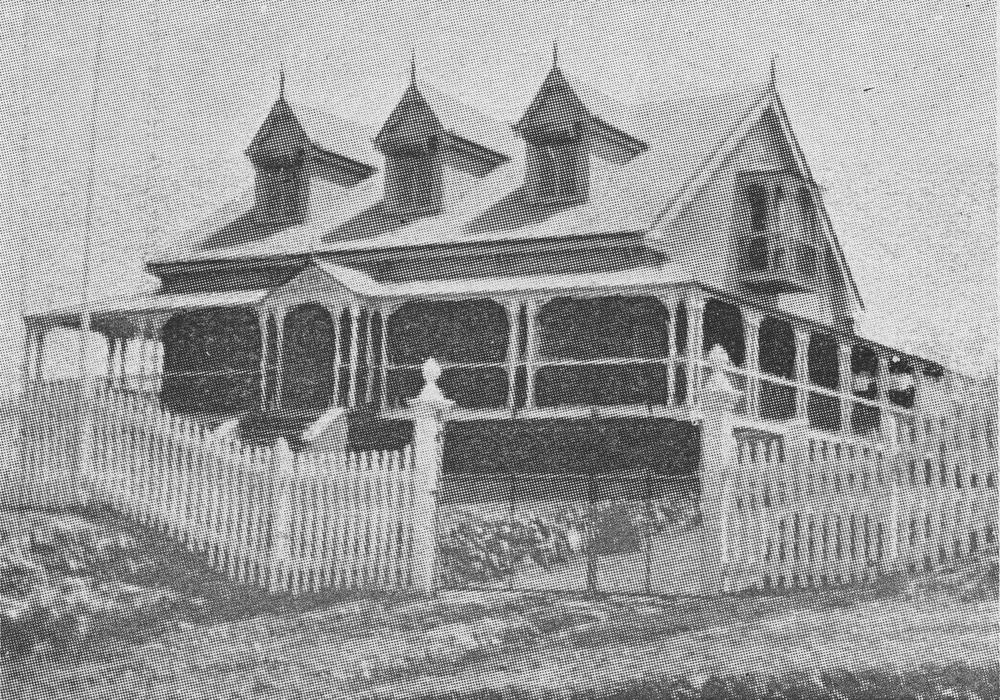
Farrington House in Alderley, 1932

Farrington House is a single storeyed timber building with attic which was apparently built in about 1882 for Frederick Waters Wilson.

Wilson was a wealthy biscuit manufacturer and champion wedding cake designer. His company FW Wilson & Co, Steam Biscuit Manufacturers (est. 1874), was the first steam biscuit factory in the colony. Wilson utilised some of his 13 acres (5.3 ha) for farming.

Apparently the property was rented from the mid 1890s till 1915 when David Henry Rhoades, a furniture manufacturer and retailer of Fortitude Valley, subdivided the estate so that the land was reduced to 2 acres (0.81 ha).

Colonel Henry William Lee lived at Farrington House from 1917 to 1930. Lee, a schoolteacher, was a foundation member of the Queensland Teachers Union and was on the University of Queensland Senate from 1920 to 1923. His eldest daughter Iva Ada was the first woman resident at Women's College studying pharmacy. Farrington House provided a social venue for Lee's children, several of whom were married there. It was during the Lees' occupation that the house was converted from kerosene lighting to electricity and the telephone installed.

Over the next two decades Farrington House changed owners frequently until purchased by the Baptist Union of Queensland. From 1948 to 1956 it was known as Clifford House, and used by the Baptists as a residence for the elderly. It subsequently became a rooming house and flats. Originally a detached kitchen and laundry were linked to the dwelling by a covered way, and beyond was a brick bathroom.

The house has been substantially renovated during its life, and has been returned to its status as a private residence. Though little remains of the original garden and orchard, the well is still viable and the position provides 360° views of Brisbane from this prominent hill-top house. Recently two stained glass windows, signed by Messrs Ashwin and Falconer, Stained Glass Artists, 314 Pitt St Sydney New South Wales of c. 1882 were removed from the house.

== Description ==
Farrington House is a single storeyed timber house with accommodation provided in the attic and underneath. The house is prominently sited on a hill top in Alderley, with expansive views of the surrounding areas.

The building is almost square in plan, with verandahs on four sides, partially enclosed on the southern and western sides. The corrugated iron gabled roof is punctuated with three dormer windows each on the tapering northern and southern sides. The gable ends of the buildings feature narrow timber balconies, with hipped awnings, flanked by multi pane casement windows. Overhanging eaves and the decorative barge boards of the gables are supported on paired timber fretwork brackets. The single skinned external walls of the principal floor of the house are cross braced. Gable ends are clad with chamfered timber boards, and the underneath of the building is clad with tongue and grooved boarding.

The south elevation of Farrington House houses the principal entrance which is via concrete stairs leading to a gabled section in the verandah awning, featuring a fretwork panel and with a finial. The verandah awning is supported on paired stop chamfered timber posts with mouldings, and fretwork brackets and infill panels between the paired posts. A cast iron balustrade, signed with John Grase Registered December 14, 1883 NO14.1, is surmounted by a bread loaf handrail. These same details are found on the gable balconies.

The front door is half glazed with a leadlight panel incorporating the words Farrington House and Dulcius ex Asperis. French doors flank this and are also found leading from all other rooms opening onto the verandah.

Internally, the house is arranged around a central hallway which extends from the front door to a rear door, and is composed of an entrance section separated from the stair section by a plaster arch lined with cedar moulding. The half turn cedar stair, has turned newel and balusters and arrives in a central open balustraded well on the attic floor. Generally the interior walls are of beaded board to the ground floor and tongue and groove on the floor above; the floors are timber board and joinery of stained cedar. Ceilings on the ground floor are generally plaster, whilst those above are beaded board.

To the west of the central hallway are the formal dining and drawing rooms, separated by a four leaf folding cedar doorway, with six panelled doors. A dark grey marble chimney piece, denoting the former dining room, features early encaustic tiles and cast iron fireplace. These rooms and the hallway are distinguished from others in the house by high skirtings boards and more elaborate cornices.

== Heritage listing ==
Farrington House was listed on the Queensland Heritage Register on 21 October 1992 having satisfied the following criteria.

The place is important in demonstrating the evolution or pattern of Queensland's history.

Farrington House demonstrates the growth of the Alderley area, and typifies the evolution of many large Queensland homes, through family home, rental property and refuge uses.

The place is important because of its aesthetic significance.

The building is of importance for its architectural quality, as a picturesque version of a late nineteenth century Queensland house, which remains intact in form. The house, situated on a prominent site in Alderley, is a local landmark.
