= John Radecki =

Australian artist (1865–1955)

- Born: 2 August 1865; Łódź
- Died: 10 May 1955 (aged 89); Hurstville
- Occupation: Stained-glass artist

John Radecki (also known as Johann and Jan Radecki) (2 August 1865 – 10 May 1955) was a master stained glass artist working in Australia, considered to be the finest such artist of his time.

Born 2 August 1865 at Łódź, Poland, son of Paweł Radecki, coalminer, and his wife Viktoria, née Bednarkiewicz. Jan trained at a German art school at Poznań. With his parents and four siblings he migrated to Australia, reaching Sydney in January 1882. The family settled at Wollongong, New South Wales, where his father and he worked in the coalmines. His parents had two more children in Australia. Moving to Sydney in 1883, Jan attended art classes. He boarded with the Saunders family from England at Oxford Street, Paddington, and on 17 May 1888 married their daughter Emma at the local district registrar's office. Living at Hurstville, John (as he was now known) was naturalized in November 1904 according to the Australian Naturalization Act of 1903.

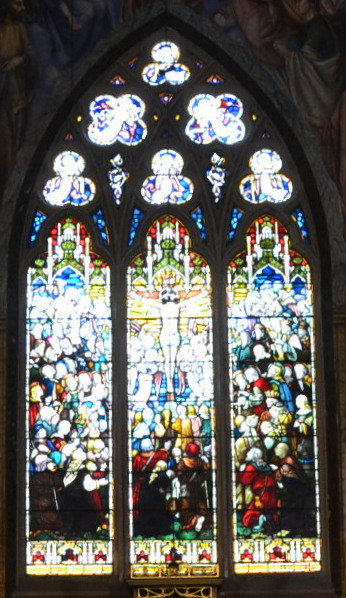
The three-light east window depicting the Crucifixion of Jesus at Sydney’s Christ Church St Laurence, 1906, by John Radecki for Ashwin and Falconer.

From 1885 Radecki had been employed by Frederick Ashwin, who taught him to work with glass. In the 1890s the two men had crafted stained-glass windows entitled 'Sermon on the Mount' (St Paul's Church, Cobbitty) and 'Nativity' (St Jude's, Randwick). Other works included a window at Yanco Agricultural College, produced in 1902 by F. Ashwin & Co. reputedly to Radecki's design, and the chancel window (1903) in St Clement's, Mosman. His first, major independent work was the 'Te Deum' window in Christ Church St Laurence, Sydney, in 1906. Ashwin and Radecki also collaborated on windows in St James's, Forest Lodge, and St John's, Campbelltown.

Following Frederick Ashwin's death in 1909, Radecki left the firm F Ashwin & Co. He became chief designer for John Ashwin & Co, in partnership with Frederick's cousin John; he was proprietor of the company from John Ashwin's death in 1920 until 1954. The largest glassmaking establishment in Sydney, with a high reputation, the firm created the chapel windows for St Scholastica's Convent, Glebe, in the early 1930s. Radecki's work included windows in such churches as St John the Evangelist's, Campbelltown, St Patrick's, Kogarah, St Joseph's, Rockdale, St Matthew's, Manly, and Our Lady of Dolours', North Goulburn, Scots Kirk, Hamilton, Newcastle, and the Presbyterian Church, Wollongong.

A church committee-member during the building in 1928 of St Declan's Catholic Church, Penshurst, Radecki designed, produced and donated the stained-glass windows there, including a memorial window dedicated to his wife, who had died in 1919. On 8 January 1921 at the Church of Christ, Hurstville, Radecki married Sydney-born Jean Hughes (d.1944).

During the 1920s John Ashwin & Co. produced the stained glass for the impressive, vaulted ceiling of what became the Commonwealth Savings Bank in Martin Place to designs by Radecki. These had an Australian character, illustrating 'the basic sources of wealth': sheep and cattle grazing, agriculture, mining, shipping and building; stockmen, carpenters, gold panning, farming and wharf labourers were shown alongside a typical banking scene. A window for the reading room of the Mitchell Library, signed 'John Radecki, Sydney 1941', depicted the printer William Caxton with the first book printed in English.

Radecki's strengths were a natural aptitude for figure drawing and composition, an eye for colour, which he used as a compositional device, an outstanding knowledge of his medium and facility with techniques in glass painting. His recreational passion was playing chess. He died on 10 May 1955 in his home at Hurstville, and was buried with Catholic rites in Woronora cemetery. The six daughters and three sons of his first marriage survived him. His daughter Winifred Siedlecky continued the company until the building's owners demolished the premises in Dixon Street in 1961.

== Notable works ==
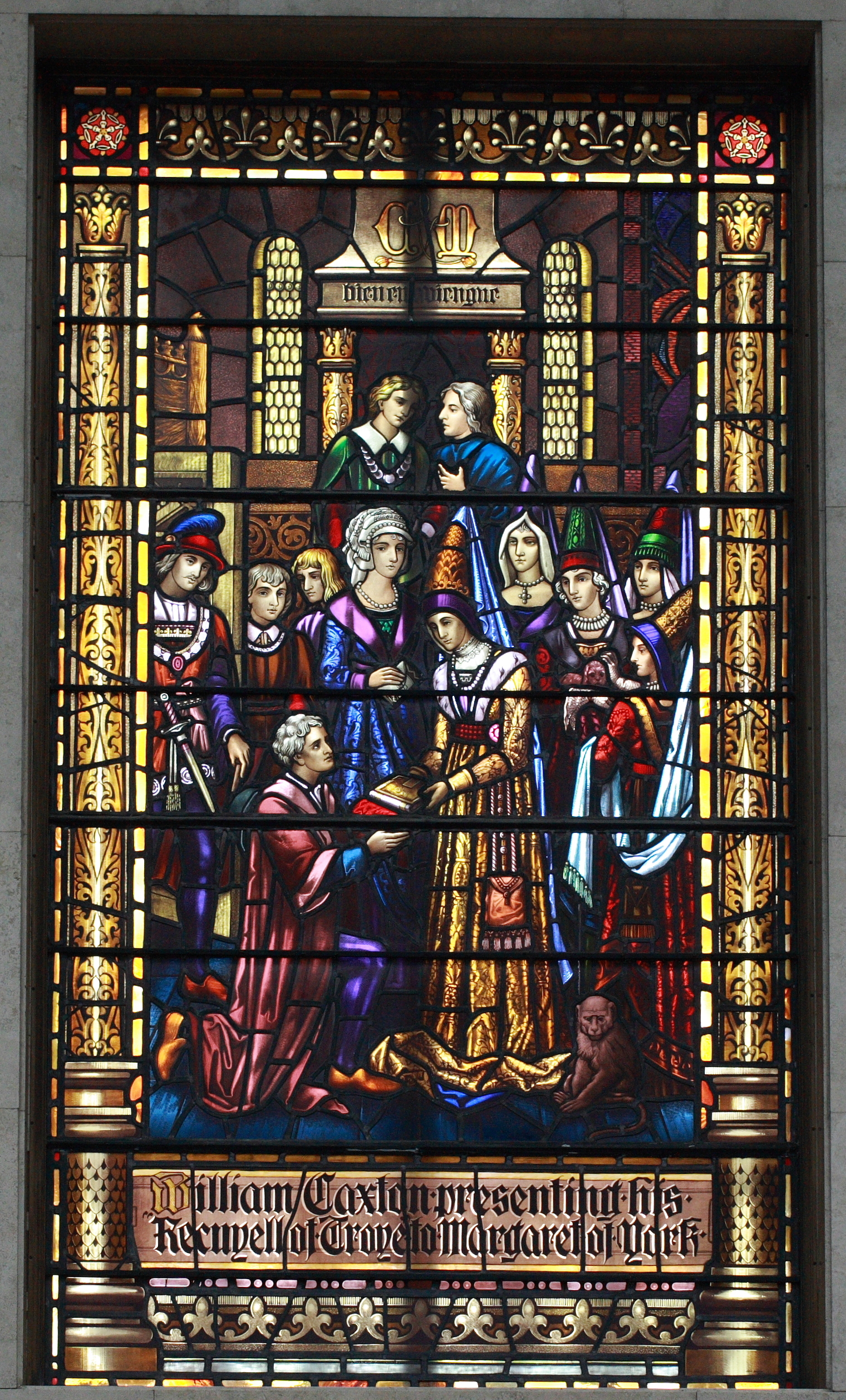
Caxton presents his translation of "Recuyell of the Historyes of Troye" to his patron, Margaret of York, Duchess of Burgundy, as depicted by Radecki in stained-glass at the Mitchell Library, NSW.

- Sermon on the Mount, St. Paul's Church, Cobbitty (1890s, with F. Ashwin)
- Nativity, St. Jude's Church, Randwick (1890s, with F. Ashwin)
- Yanco Agricultural High School, (1902, design by Radecki, production by F. Ashwin; it was then known as the Yanco Agricultural College)
- Chancel window, St. Clement's church, Mosman (1903, with F. Ashwin)
- Te Deum, Christ Church St Laurence, Sydney (1906, Radecki's first major independent work)
- St. John the Evangelist Church, Campbelltown (both with F. Ashwin and independently)
- Commonwealth Savings Bank, Martin Place, Sydney (mid-1920s; windows in the vaulted ceiling)
- St. Declan's Catholic Church, Penshurst (1928; includes a window dedicated to Radecki's wife who died in 1919)
- St. Scholastica's Convent, Glebe (early 1930s)
- St Mary's Catholic Church, Mudgee (Two windows, southwest corner)
- St. Patrick's, Kogarah
- St. Joseph's, Rockdale
- St. Matthew's, Manly
- Our Lady of Dolours', North Goulburn
- Presbyterian Church, Wollongong
- Mitchell Library, Sydney (1941 depicting William Caxton)
