= Strathearn (disambiguation) =

Strathearn is a place in Scotland.

Strathearn may also refer to:

- Strathearn (Edmonton), a neighbourhood in Edmonton, Alberta
- Duke of Cumberland and Strathearn
- Duke of Kent and Strathearn
- Duke of Connaught and Strathearn
- Earl of Strathearn
- Strathearn distillery
- Strathearn School in Belfast, Northern Ireland
- Strathearn, Alderley, an Anzac Cottage in Brisbane, Queensland, Australia
