= Anderson Strathern =

Scottish law firm

Anderson Strathern LLP
- Type: Limited liability partnership (60 partners)
- Industry: Lawyers, Solicitors, Corporate and commercial law
- Founded: 1992
- Headquarters: Edinburgh, Scotland
- Number of locations: 5
- Area served: United Kingdom
- Services: legal advice
- Revenue: £38.77m (2025)
- Number of employees: 331 staff
- Website: andersonstrathern.co.uk

Anderson Strathern LLP is a Scottish law firm headquartered in Edinburgh.

The offices are located in Edinburgh, Glasgow, Shetland, Orkney and East Lothian.

== History ==
Anderson Strathern was founded in 1992, following the merger of two Edinburgh firms, J&F Anderson and Strathern & Blair.

Anderson Strathern was joined in July 2011 by the partners and staff of property practice Bell & Scott.

== Practice Areas ==
- Corporate and commercial law
- Banking and finance
- Mergers and acquisitions
- Commercial dispute resolution
- Real estate and construction
- Employment law
- Intellectual property and technology
- Public sector and regulatory law
- Private client services

== Rankings and Recognition ==
The firm’s corporate practice is ranked in Chambers and Partners for Corporate/M&A work and has advised on transactions with an aggregate value approaching £1 billion in 2024.

In The Legal 500 UK, the firm is ranked Tier 1 in agriculture and estates, charities and not-for-profit, education, and medical negligence.

Anderson Strathern has also been recognised at the Legal 500 Scotland Awards, including being named Private Client Firm of the Year and Insurance Firm of the Year in 2024.
