= Keperra railway station =

Railway station in Queensland, Australia

Keperra
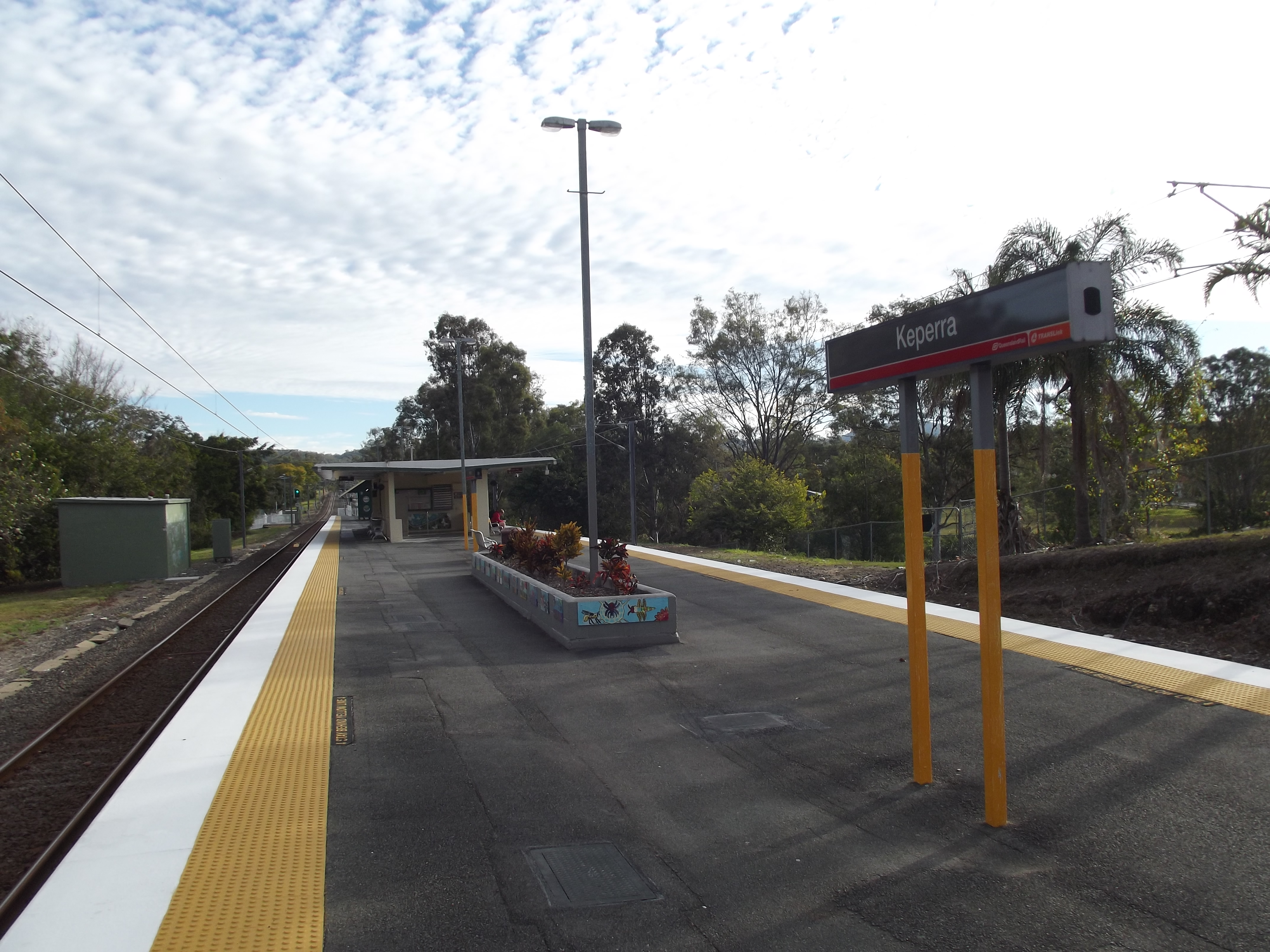
- Westbound view in August 2012

General information
- Location: Silvertop Street, Keperra
- Coordinates: 27°24′33″S 152°57′24″E
- Owner: Queensland Rail
- Operator: Queensland Rail
- Line: Ferny Grove
- Distance: 13.46 kilometres from Central
- Platforms: 2 (1 island)
- Tracks: 2

Construction
- Structure type: Ground
- Parking: 26 bays
- Accessible: Yes

Other information
- Status: Staffed
- Station code: 600387 (platform 1); 600388 (platform 2)
- Fare zone: Zone 2
- Website: Queensland Rail

History
- Opened: 1932

Services
Preceding station	Queensland Rail	Following station
Grovely towards Beenleigh via Roma Street	Ferny Grove line	Ferny Grove Terminus
Location

Keperra is a railway station operated by Queensland Rail on the Ferny Grove line. It opened in 1932 and serves the Brisbane suburb of Keperra. It is a ground level station, featuring one island platform with two faces.

== Services ==
Keperra station is served by all stops Ferny Grove line services from Ferny Grove to Roma Street, Boggo Road, Coopers Plains and Beenleigh.

== Platforms and services ==
Keperra platform arrangement
Platform	Line	Destination	Notes
1	Ferny Grove	Roma Street (to Beenleigh line)	
2	Ferny Grove	Ferny Grove	
