= Strathearn, Alderley =

Strathearn
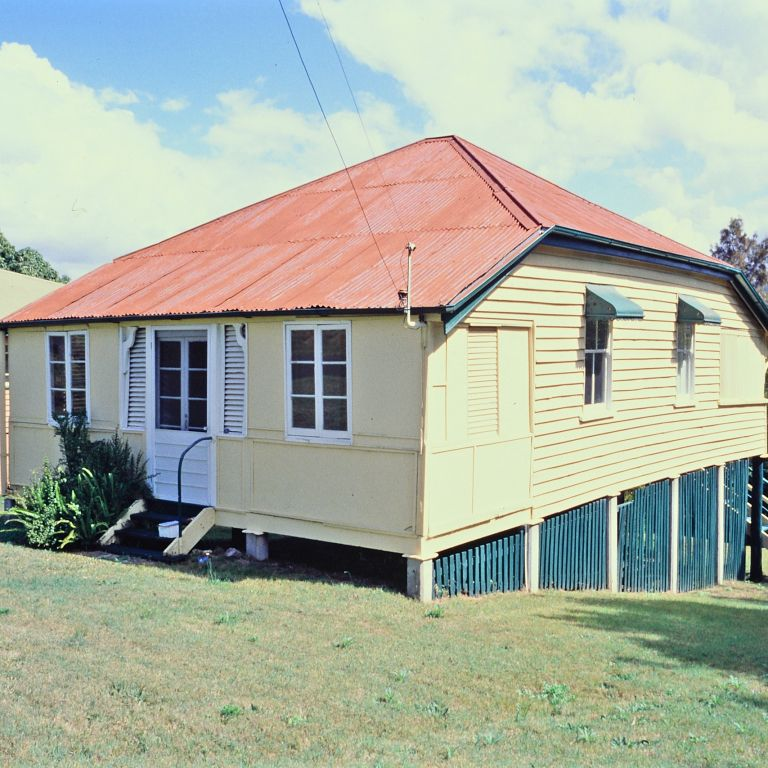
- Strathearn, 1999

- Location within Queensland Location within Australia
- 27.4255°S 152.9969°E
- Location: 16 Quarry Road, Alderley, City of Brisbane, Queensland, Australia

History
- Design period: 1919–1930s (interwar period)
- Built: 1920–1950s

Queensland Heritage Register
- Official name: Strathearn, Anzac Cottage (no.37)
- Type: state heritage (built, landscape)
- Designated: 5 February 2007
- Reference no.: 602064
- Significant period: 1920s–1950s (fabric); 1920s (historical)
- Significant components: garden/grounds, trees/plantings, residential accommodation – main house

Strathearn is a heritage-listed cottage at 16 Quarry Road, Alderley, City of Brisbane, Queensland, Australia. It was built between 1920 and 1950. It is also known as Anzac Cottage (no.37). It was added to the Queensland Heritage Register on 5 February 2007.

== History ==
This small timber weatherboard house was built as an Anzac Cottage Trust home in 1920, and was occupied by members of the same family until 1998.

The Australian public reacted to the many casualties and deaths suffered during World War I by building war memorials and providing homes for wounded veterans and families of those killed. One such project was the Anzac Cottage Trust. Many of the cottages were built on donated land, with volunteers supplying most of the labour, and were built in Australian states. The first was most likely erected in Western Australia by volunteer labour, and officially opened on 15 April 1916.

In Queensland the initial Anzac Cottage Trust, a sub-committee of the Queensland War Council established 25 September 1915, met weekly at the Commercial Travelers Sample Rooms in Charlotte Street. The objective of this committee was to acquire land for the erection of homes for homeless widows, or other female dependents, and descendants of deceased men who had enlisted in Queensland for military or naval service during World War I. The committee was also responsible for nominating those who would occupy the cottage. The widow had to be of "good character", remain single, not be seen drinking publicly nor have male callers. She was also required to pay the bills, any local government charges, for fire insurance, and maintain the house in good order. From the outset, the land was to be vested in the Public Curator upon trust in perpetuity and the widow or female descendant was required to sign a lease with the Public Curator. The rental was intended to fund the maintenance of these cottages. An occupier could apply to this fund for assistance with upkeep costs. The Public Trustee, with agreement from the committee, had the right to raise revenue for the repairing, maintaining and/or rebuilding of such cottages.

The conditions of tenancy for the Anzac Cottages also stated that any child, descendant or widow who married had immediately to vacate the property. They were allowed to reside or share the occupancy only with the approval of the committee. On the death of the widow, a descendant capable of caring for the remaining family could, at the discretion of the committee, be allowed to remain on signing of a lease. Alternately, the house could be re-let to a person who fitted the Trust's conditions and on similar terms.

The first Anzac cottage built in Queensland was at Wynnum, opened by the Governor on 12 August 1917. Many of the Anzac Cottages constructed in Queensland were funded from profits of "Golden Caskets", the Queensland lottery, numbers three, four and five. This was an initiative of Harry Coyne, chairman of the Anzac Cottage Committee, subcommittee to the Queensland War Council. The prizes awarded in these lotteries were very large. First, second and third prizes were £5,000, £1,000 and £500 respectively and the total prize pool was £10.000. Golden Casket number three went on sale on 2 March 1918 and was drawn at the Brisbane Stadium on 23 August 1918. The fourth Golden Casket sold out in less than five months and was drawn 14 May 1919, while the fifth was drawn on 13 November 1919. Harry Coyne MP, still Chairman of the Anzac Cottage Committee, was again at the Brisbane Stadium to conduct the draw and told the large crowd that profits from the three Golden Caskets would allow for between 60 and 80 homes to be built for war widows.

Thirty-eight cottages were built in Brisbane, and most had a name reflecting the Anzac theme; names such as Kitchener, Haig, Monash, Hopetown and Chauvel. The second last cottage to be built, number 37 was called Strathearn and was erected at 16 Quarry Road, Alderley. It was occupied by the Warner family.

English born John Thomas Warner was 42 when he enrolled at Enoggera, although he gave his age as 38 years old. Private Warner was buried in a shell explosion at Ypres in 1917. Rescued the following day he was sent home. He died during March 1920 and was buried in a war grave in Toowong Cemetery. The newly widowed Mrs Mary Ann Warner and five children moved into their new Anzac Cottage, Strathearn in July 1920, and a son Jack was born soon after. Her daughter Mrs Florence Richardson Handley, who was ten when the family moved into Strathearn, moved back into the family home following the death of her husband. As a World War II Prisoner of War he worked on the Burma railway and died when his Japanese transport was torpedoed.

Mrs Warner was a keen gardener and a family tradition was the adding of a piece of a sacred bamboo planted by Mrs Warner to wedding bouquets and the giving of each family member a cutting for planting when they moved into a new home. Mrs Warner was working in her garden when she died in 1955, and the Public Curator permitted Mrs Florence Richardson Handley to remain in the house.

This Anzac Cottage remained the venue for family activities such as Christmas Day, until Florence Handley died on 10 February 1998. Since then, the house has remained vacant. The wooden fence which was supported by stones from the nearby quarry has been recently removed, as have some of the trees and shrubs.

The Anzac Trust Committee was disbanded in 1932 with all responsibility passing to the Public Curator (renamed Public Trustee in 1978). By 1956 the number of World War I widows and dependents requiring housing had decreased and most of the cottages were rented to non-Anzac families. Also, the maintenance fund was in financial straits so that it was suggested by the Public Curator to the Attorney General that some of the vacant dwellings be sold to fund repairs to tenanted cottages and consideration be given to winding up the Trust. The Anzac Cottages & TB Homes Act of 1960 was subsequently passed, enabling the sale of Anzac Cottages. Thirteen were sold by 6 April 1963 and Strathearn was the only remaining Anzac Cottage the Public Trustee was still responsible for in 1999.

It was sold in September 2000.

== Description ==
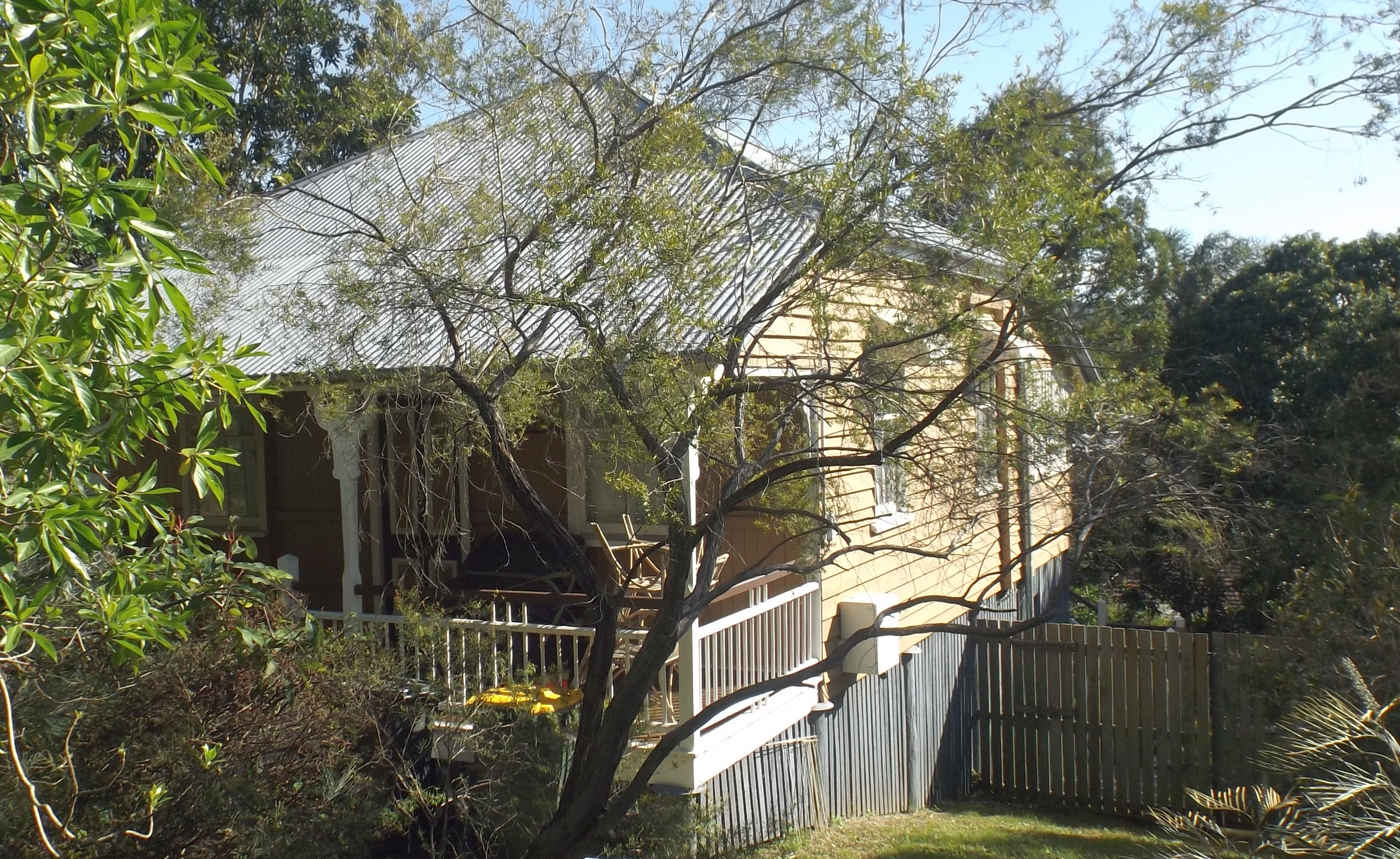
Strathearn, 2015

This house is a single storey, timber weatherboard house with a short ridge corrugated iron roof. It occupies an elevated position with the back windows looking out towards Enoggera Army Barracks and the hills.

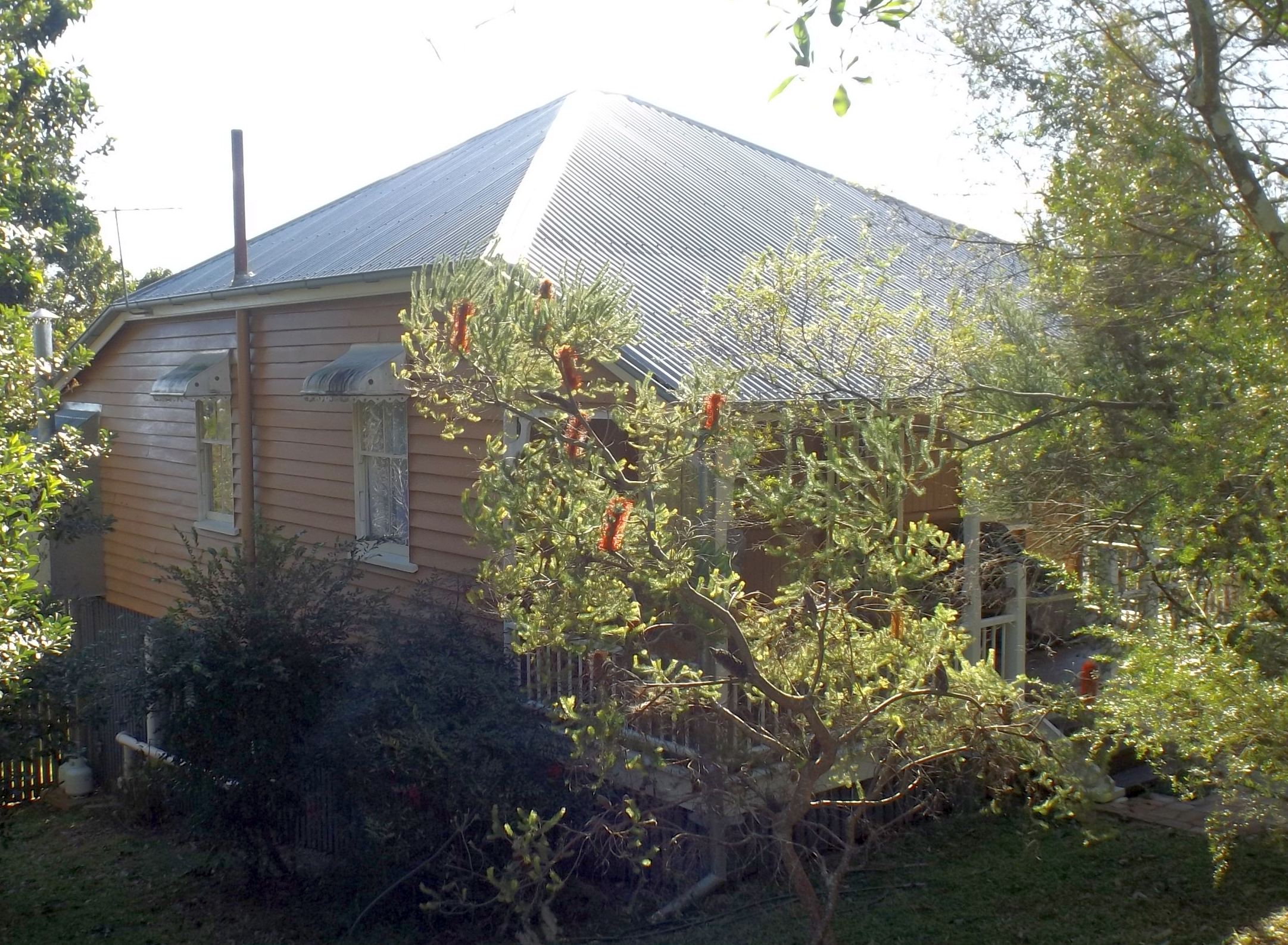
Garden obscures much of the house, 2015

The front elevation of the cottage features a verandah which has been enclosed with fibro sheeting. A centrally-located entry is accessed via two timber steps and features side-hung casement doors. Abutting the casement doors on either side is a louvred opening, extending half-way down the front facade from the front eave. A casement window is located either side of the central entry. The side walls of the enclosed verandah contain louvred openings.

The side elevations of the cottage feature two, two-paned sash windows, surmounted by metal shades. A metal shade also covers the rear kitchen window.

The cottage is located on a sloping block, resulting in the building being high-set at the back. It is supported on capped concrete posts, infilled with timber slats. A timber staircase provides access to the rear of the house. Positioned above the stairs in the rear wall are three casement windows.

Typical of pyramidal and short ridge houses with a front verandah the front door opens onto a passageway that separates the two front bedrooms and leads into the sitting room. The kitchen and dining room are at the back of the house.

While the house originally had a third bedroom, this has been converted into a bathroom.

Substantial plantings are located to the rear (western) and side (southern) elevations of the cottage.

== Heritage listing ==
Strathearn was listed on the Queensland Heritage Register on 5 February 2007 having satisfied the following criteria.

The place is important in demonstrating the evolution or pattern of Queensland's history.

Strathearn is important in demonstrating the pattern of Queensland's history, built under the Anzac Cottage Scheme to provide accommodation for the families of Queensland enlisted soldiers or sailors who died during World War I. These houses were funded with the proceeds of the Queensland lottery, draws three, four and five.

The place demonstrates rare, uncommon or endangered aspects of Queensland's cultural heritage.

Strathearn is a rare aspect of Queensland's cultural heritage as one of the last Anzac Cottages, built under the Anzac Cottage Scheme, to be held by the Public Trustee.

The place is important in demonstrating the principal characteristics of a particular class of cultural places.

Strathearn is intact and in original condition, and as such is important in demonstrating the principal characteristics of an Anzac Cottage.

The place is important because of its aesthetic significance.

Strathearn is of aesthetic significance, adding to the streetscape of Quarry Road.

The place has a strong or special association with a particular community or cultural group for social, cultural or spiritual reasons.

The place has a special association with the Queensland community as evidence of the community's response of support for the families of those killed during World War I.

The place has a special association with the life or work of a particular person, group or organisation of importance in Queensland's history.

The place has a special association with the work of the Anzac Cottage Trust, a sub-committee of the Queensland War Council. Strathearn also has a special association with the Queensland lottery. The Trust constructed many cottages with funds raised in Queensland lottery, draws three, four and five.
