= Keperra =

- Suburb
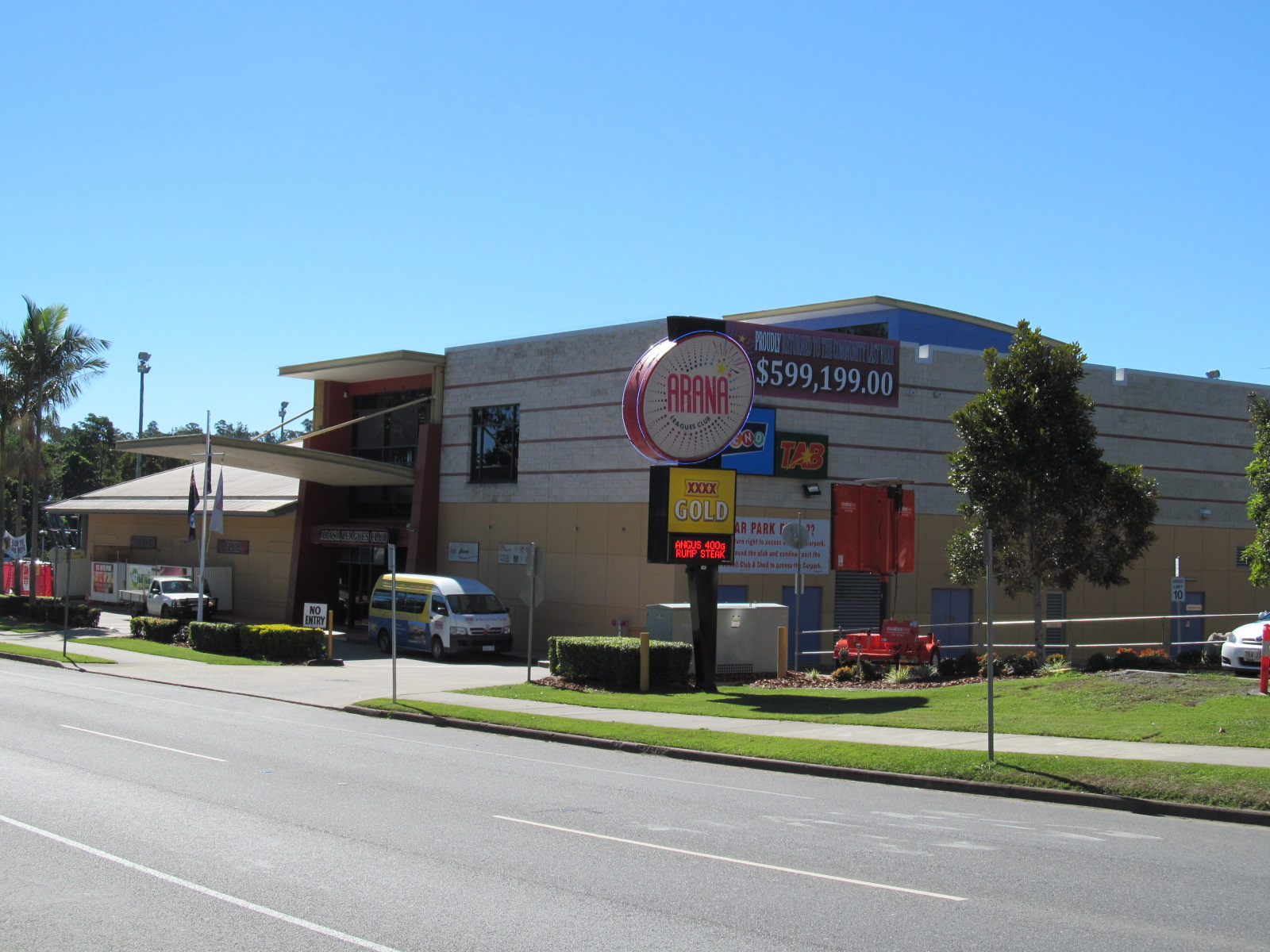
- Arana leagues club

- Interactive map of Keperra
- Coordinates: 27.4119°S 152.9550°E
- Country: Australia
- State: Queensland
- City: Brisbane
- LGA: City of Brisbane (Enoggera Ward, The Gap Ward)
- Location: 12.4 km (7.7 mi) NW of Brisbane CBD

Government
  - State electorates: Ferny Grove; Everton
  - Federal division: Ryan

Area
  - Total: 5.6 km^{2} (2.2 sq mi)

Population
  - Total: 7,014 (2021 census)
  - Density: 1,253/km^{2} (3,244/sq mi)
- Time zone: UTC+10:00 (AEST)
- Postcode: 4054
Suburbs around Keperra
Ferny Hills	Arana Hills	Everton Hills
Ferny Grove	Keperra	Mitchelton
Upper Kedron	The Gap	Enoggera

Keperra is a north-western suburb in the City of Brisbane, Queensland, Australia. It is located 12.4 kilometres (7.7 mi) by road north-west of the Brisbane central business district. In the 2021 census, Keperra had a population of 7,014.

== Geography ==
The Ferny Grove railway line running east between Keperra, Grovely, Oxford Park and Mitchelton was duplicated in 2008.

Grovely is a neighbourhood within the suburb of Keperra.

== History ==
Keperra has a deep and rich indigenous history. The name Keperra comes from a Yuggera words kipper/kippa indicating a young man. Two bora rings used to be located within the suburb, one near the corner of Samford Road and Keperra Street (now under housing) and one which disappeared with the construction of the Keperra Country Club. It is thought that the name derives from the initiation ceremonies of young men performed at the bora rings.

In 1865, Thomas Price sold a large portion of land in Keperra to John and Mary Nicholson who built a home and named it Groveley Lodge (the extra 'e' in the name was dropped in later years). In the absence of a church in the area, the Nicholsons held services within Groveley Lodge and later built St Matthews Anglican Church, Grovely in what is now Church Street, Mitchelton; John and Mary Nicholson are buried in the churchyard cemetery.

The railway was built through the area in 1918 but it was originally a siding located near the western end of the Keperra Country Club. Keperra railway station was named in 1932.

On 26 October 1918, 107 allotments of the Grovely Station Estate were advertised for auction by W.J. Down & Co. The allotments were adjacent to the Grovely railway station on the Enoggera line.

Capt. Robert H Cottam founded the Keperra Golf Club in 1931. It was originally called the Enoggera Golf Club, but changed to its present name in 1940. The clubhouse was built in 1939–1940.

In about 1940 a military camp was established on the slaughterhouse site. The army camp constructed many of the roads and much of the land was transferred to the Housing Commission for housing development in 1951.

From 1966 to 1998, there was a drive-in movie theatre located at the corner of Settlement and Samford Roads. It was operated by R.W.P. Dodd Theatres and later by Birch Carroll & Coyle. It could accommodate 650 cars. Initially it had a single screen but was later converted to a two-screen. The land is now the site of the Kings Grove housing estate, located within the Kings Park Estate.

Great Western Super Centre opened in 2000. It underwent a $22 million refurbishment in 2022.

A Woolworths supermarket in the Great Western Super Centre became the scene of the rampage on 16 May 2026. Two teenage girls allegedly tore a trail of items from an aisle, forcing shoppers to evacuate the supermarket, sending it into lockdown. They were later arrested at the scene and taken into custody on 3 counts of common assault.

== Demographics ==
In the 2021 census, Keperra had a population of 7,014, 52.5% female and 47.5% male. The median age was 38 years, the same as the national median. 78.8% of people living in Keperra were born in Australia, compared to the national average of 66.9%; the next most common countries of birth were England 3.3%, New Zealand 2.3%, and South Africa, India and Scotland all 0.7%. 86.6% of people spoke only English at home; the next most common languages were Spanish 0.9%, Karen 0.8%, Italian and Burmese 0.5% and Mandarin 0.4%.

In the 2016 census, Keperra had a population of 6,807, 52.9% female and 47.1% male. The median age was 38 years, the same as the national median. 79.4% of people living in Keperra were born in Australia, compared to the national average of 66.7%; the next most common countries of birth were England 3.7%, New Zealand 2.6%, India 0.7% and Philippines and Scotland 0.6%. 88.3% of people spoke only English at home; the next most common languages were Karen 0.7%, Mandarin, Spanish and Italian all 0.5% and Arabic 0.4%.

In the 2011 census, Keperra had a population of 6,652, 52.6% female and 47.4% male. The median age was 37 years, the same as the national median. 80.3% of people living in Keperra were born in Australia, compared to the national average of 69.8%; the next most common countries of birth were England 3.9%, New Zealand 2.4%, Scotland 0.7%, Philippines 0.6%, and South Africa 0.6%. 90.2% of people spoke only English at home; the next most common languages were Italian 0.6%, Cantonese 0.5%, Arabic and Spanish 0.4% and Filipino 0.3%.

== Economy ==
There is a large quarry at 469 Settlement Road (27.4236°S 152.9497°E), where extractive activities are still in operation as at 2021, but it is planned to convert the quarry site into a housing estate. In 2023, the first parcels of land at The Quarry were released with the development undertaken by Frasers Property.

== Education ==
Grovely State School is a government primary (Prep–6) school for boys and girls at 200 Dawson Parade (27.4019°S 152.9613°E). In 2018, the school had an enrolment of 375 students with 26 teachers (23 full-time equivalent) and 22 non-teaching staff (11 full-time equivalent). It includes a special education program.

Mitchelton State High School Positive Learning Centre is a specific-purpose primary and secondary (4–12) school at 83 Gilston Street (27.4087°S 152.9580°E). It is for students who require intervention beyond the capacity of a conventional classroom with goal of returning them into mainstream schooling or into vocational programs.

There are no mainstream secondary schools in Keperra. The nearest government secondary schools are Ferny Grove State High School in neighbouring Ferny Grove to the west and Mitchelton State High School in neighbouring Mitchelton to the east.

The Brisbane Institute of Tecand Further Education (TAFE) Grovely Campus is at Fitzsimmons Street.

== Amenities ==
Keperra Country Club has a 27-hole Championship golf course.

The Great Western Shopping Centre is at the intersection of Settlement Road and Samford Road. Bunnings warehouse opened in 2018 with further retail to open in 2019.

The Arana Leagues Club on Dawson Parade is near the border with the suburb of Arana Hills.

Other amenities include thefootball (soccer) club Westside FC, two small shopping centres at Dallas Parade near the Keperra station and on Dawson Parade near Grovely station), churches, a hospital, and a dog off-leash area. An area of vegetation known as Keperra Bushland bounds the suburb to the south on its border with The Gap while the Keperra Picnic Grounds are located in the north-west section at the intersection of Samford Road and Upper Kedron Road.

== Housing ==
Keperra Sanctuary Retirement Village is at 998 Samford Road, just east of the Great Western Shopping Centre.

== Transport ==
Keperra and Grovely railway stations provides access to regular Queensland Rail services to Ferny Grove, Brisbane and Beenleigh.

Transport for Brisbane offers a bus service on route 362 between West Ashgrove through The Gap to Brookside Shopping Centre with stops at Great Western Shopping Centre, Keperra railway station, Grovely railway station and Mitchelton railway station.

The bus service on Route 398 is between Mitchelton railway station and Ferny Grove railway station, with stops within Keperra.
