= Grovely railway station =

Railway station in Queensland, Australia

Grovely
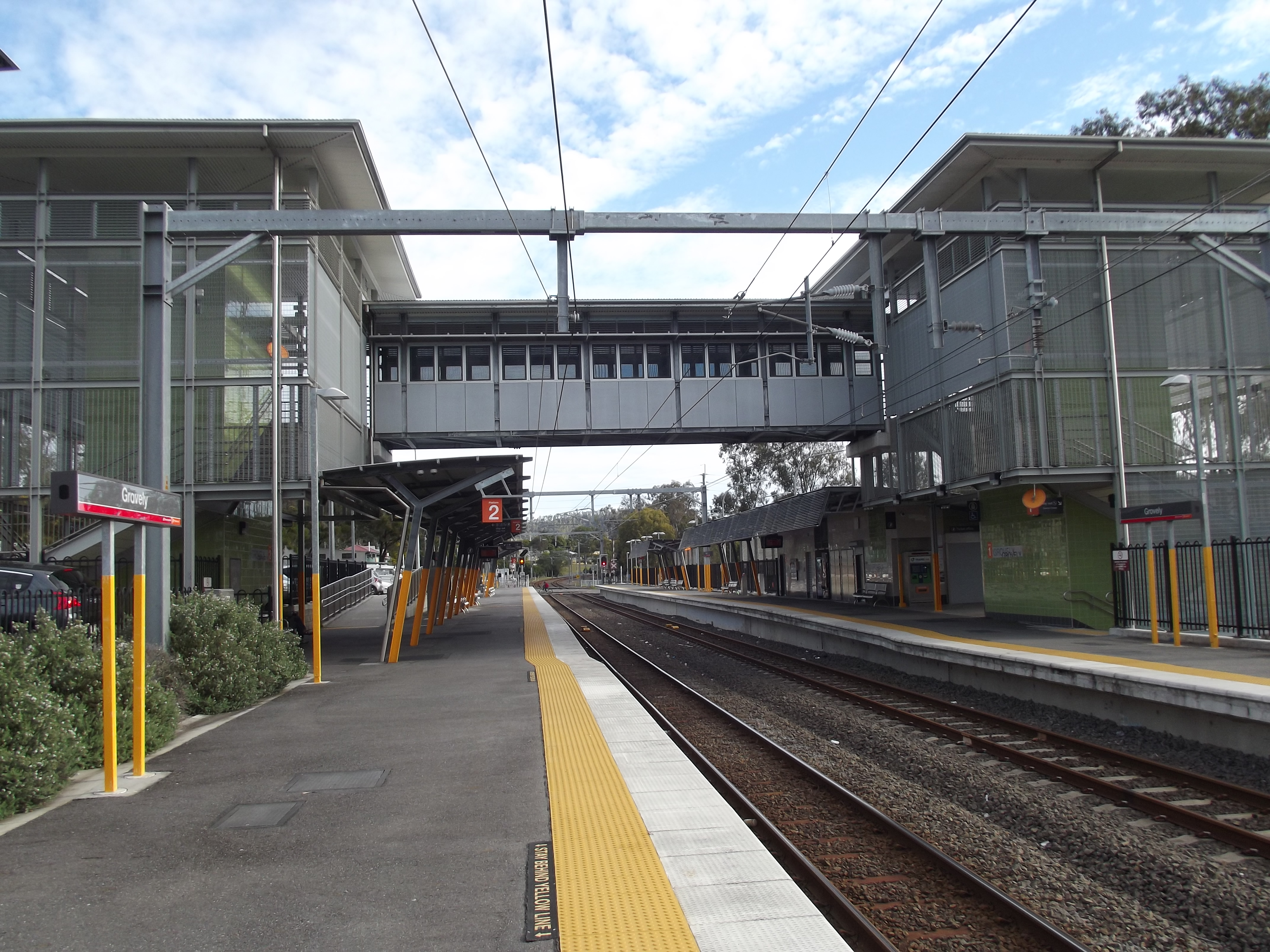
- North-west bound view from Platform 2 in August 2012

General information
- Location: Blaker Road, Grovely
- Coordinates: 27°24′16″S 152°57′45″E
- Owner: Queensland Rail
- Operator: Queensland Rail
- Line: Ferny Grove
- Distance: 12.67 kilometres from Central
- Platforms: 2 side
- Tracks: 2

Construction
- Structure type: Ground
- Parking: 208 bays
- Cycle facilities: Yes
- Accessible: Yes

Other information
- Status: Staffed part time
- Station code: 600385 (platform 1); 600386 (platform 2)
- Fare zone: Zone 2
- Website: Queensland Rail

History
- Opened: 29 June 1918
- Rebuilt: 2008

Services
Preceding station	Queensland Rail	Following station
Oxford Park towards Beenleigh via Roma Street	Ferny Grove line	Keperra towards Ferny Grove
Location

Grovely is a railway station operated by Queensland Rail on the Ferny Grove line. It opened in 1918 and serves the Brisbane suburb of Keperra. It is a ground level station, featuring two side platforms.

== History ==
The station was upgraded in 2008 as part of the Mitchelton to Keperra duplication project. The upgrade included a new platform & footbridge.

== Services ==
Grovely station is served by all stops Ferny Grove line services from Ferny Grove to Roma Street, Boggo Road (formerly known as Park Road), Coopers Plains and Beenleigh.

== Platforms and services ==
Grovely platform arrangement
Platform	Line	Destination	Notes
1	Ferny Grove	Roma Street (to Beenleigh line)	
2	Ferny Grove	Ferny Grove	
