= Wilston Methodist Memorial Church =

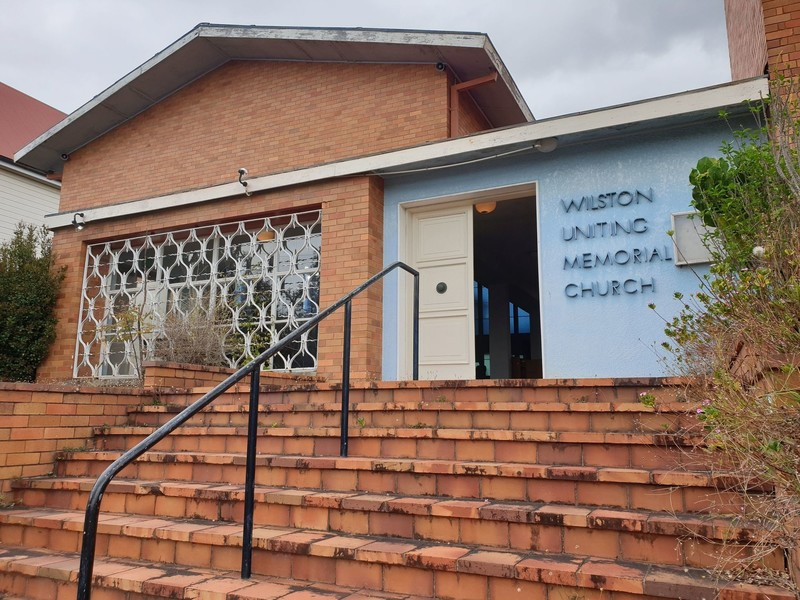
- Entrance from Hawdon Street, 2021

- Location within Queensland
- 27.4285°S 153.0189°E
- Location: 181 Kedron Brook Road, Wilston, Queensland, Australia

History
- Design period: 1940s–1960s (Post-WWII)
- Built: 1956

Site notes
- Architect: Ford, Hutton & Newell
- Architectural style: Modernism

Queensland Heritage Register
- Official name: Wilston Methodist Memorial Church (former); Trinity Grove Uniting Church; Trinity-Wilston Memorial Uniting Church; Wilston Uniting Church; Wilston Methodist Church
- Type: state heritage
- Designated: 12 November 2021
- Reference no.: 650239
- Type: Religion/worship: Church
- Theme: Creating social and cultural institutions: Worshipping and religious institutions

Wilston Methodist Memorial Church is a heritage-listed former church at 181 Kedron Brook Road, Wilston, Queensland, Australia. It was designed by Ford, Hutton & Newell and built in 1956. It is also known as Trinity Grove Uniting Church, Trinity-Wilston Memorial Uniting Church, Wilston Uniting Church, and Wilston Methodist Church. It was added to the Queensland Heritage Register on 12 November 2021. It was removed from the heritage register in 2024 following a court case initiated by the Uniting Church of Australia.

== History ==
The former Wilston Methodist Memorial Church is located in the Brisbane suburb of Wilston, 4.5 km north of the Brisbane CBD, is designed in a Modernist style and was constructed of concrete-encased steel portal frames and face brick in 1956. It stands on a small suburban site that includes an earlier timber church (1913) remodelled with brick in 1966 to harmonise with its 1950s replacement, and a columbarium (c. 2000). The Wilston Methodist Memorial Church was designed by prominent Brisbane architecture firm, Ford Hutton and Newell. The Modernist-style building resulted from the Methodist Church's progressive building program in accordance with its post-war mission to grow and remain relevant to modern society.

European occupation of the area now known as Wilston, part of the traditional lands of the Turrbal people, began in the 1850s when the land was sold for agricultural settlement. During the 19th century, Wilston remained a predominantly rural area, although subdivision of some estates took place in the 1880s. The opening of a railway line from Bowen Hills to Enoggera in 1899, which included a station at Wilston, provided transport to the city centre and stimulated the transformation of the farming district to suburban residential use. The suburb took its name from "Wilston" - 300 acres (121 ha) of land on which William Wilson, a city merchant and politician, built a stone house c. 1876. The suburb of Wilston was incorporated in the Town of Windsor, which was proclaimed in 1904. The rapid development of the suburb was reflected in the construction of four churches between 1913 and 1915, to serve the growing population.

Methodism arose as a movement within the Church of England in the early 18th century. It spread rapidly throughout the United States of America in the late 18th and early 19th centuries, via itinerant preachers; and later throughout the world via Methodist missionaries. The term "Methodism" arose from the methodical way the Christian faith was approached and included an emphasis on preaching, evangelism, a love for singing, and social activism.

The first Methodist church in Brisbane was a modest brick chapel constructed in 1849 on the corner of Albert Street and Burnett Lane. A larger building replaced it in 1856, and was superseded in 1889 by the Albert Street Methodist Church (now the Albert Street Uniting Church). The Albert Street church became the central Methodist church for Brisbane, with other Methodist churches established in burgeoning Brisbane suburbs, such as Wilston.

Wilston Methodist Church, a gothic-inspired timber building, was erected in 1913 on three small suburban allotments bounded by Kedron Brook Road, Hawdon Street and Dibley Avenue. The allotments were: Subdivisions 55–57 of Portion 260, Parish of Enoggera. Portion 260 had been granted to Patrick Byrne in 1850 sold in 1862 to Shepherd Smith, manager of the Brisbane branch of the Bank of New South Wales and resold to William Henry Paling, musician and merchant, of Sydney in 1888. Paling subdivided the land into residential allotments at the height of Brisbane's 1880s building boom, but due to the 1890s economic depression that followed, it was not sold. After Paling's death in 1895 the land was vested in Queensland Trustees Limited. A new survey plan for residential subdivision of the Paling Estate was created in 1909. The 16- to 24-perch residential allotments were advertised for sale in 1909 and the majority sold prior to World War I (WWI). These 16-perch (405m2) allotments were part of the Paling Estate, a residential subdivision created in 1909; most of which sold prior to the commencement of World War I (WWI) in 1914. The allotments forming the site were purchased by individuals, but in June 1913 they were transferred to the Methodist Church, with David Henry Rhoades, Ebenezer Chapman, William Shields, Reuben Chapman and Joseph Massey appointed as the trustees.

Following successful fundraising, the Wilston Methodist Church was officially opened by the President of the Methodist Conference, Reverend Richard Dunstan, on 26 October 1913. The timber-framed, chamferboard-clad building with a front porch, vestries and corrugated-iron roof was sited close to Dibley Avenue and faced Hawdon Street. Designed by builder and church trustee, Reuben Chapman, the church was constructed by Messrs J Scobie and Son.

The church was administered as part of the Valley Circuit until 1922 when the Wilston, Windsor and Grange churches formed the Windsor Circuit. By 1925, the Windsor Circuit had grown to such an extent that it was upgraded to a married minister's circuit and a spacious house on Montpelier Street in Wilston was purchased as its parsonage.

The establishment of the Grange electric tramway along Days Road in 1928 stimulated further residential and commercial development in Wilston. By the early 1930s, Wilston comprised a substantial part of the Windsor census district, which had grown from 1,876 residents in 1911 to 6,655 in 1933.

Expansion of the Wilston Methodist Church's membership and activities reflected the growth of the suburb. As well as Sunday services, the building was used for Sunday School, Ladies Guild, a range of youth activities, and fundraising events such as entertainments; while the grounds accommodated fetes. By the late 1930s, a larger building was required, but the outbreak of World War II (WWII) in September 1939 delayed this development.

In anticipation of the conclusion of WWII, planning for the post-war future of Wilston Methodist Church began. In 1944, the congregation decided that the much-needed new church would be a memorial church. In the following year, the Telegraph newspaper reported that the church would be built in honour of those men and women of the Windsor Circuit serving in the armed forces. As utilitarian memorials were more popular after WWII than after WWI, and were supported by the Returned Sailors', Soldiers' and Airmen's Imperial League of Australia (RSSAILA), memorial halls, libraries, swimming pools, meeting rooms, council chambers, lawn bowls clubs, playgrounds, hospitals, and kindergartens resulted; as well as many war memorial churches built throughout Queensland in the post-WWII era.

Although about £1,500 had been raised in 1945, more funds were required before a substantial building could be erected. Donations towards the new church were facilitated by the Australian Government's tax deduction scheme for donations to war memorial funds, which operated from 1927 to 1973.

By 1952, the Wilston Methodist Church trustees were ready to proceed with the new building. The congregation appointed the Brisbane-based architecture firm Ford Hutton and Newell to design a modern church rather than a traditional building.

Operating between 1951 and c. 1958, Ford Hutton and Newell comprised Eric Ford, Theodore Hutton and Peter Newell. The firm had been established as Chambers & Ford by Claude William Chambers and Eric Ford and from 1920 to 1935 had designed churches in various architectural styles in the interwar period. Examples of their work include the Californian Bungalow style (St Margaret's Anglican Church, Sandgate, 1927) and Spanish Mission style (Holy Trinity Church, Woolloongabba 1930). Soon after Ford Hutton and Newell formed, it gained commissions to design a number of substantial churches throughout Queensland, including Anglican churches at Millmerran, Townsville, Stanthorpe, Charleville, Annerley and Beaudesert; and Methodist Churches at Atherton and Wilston.

The 1950s were a prosperous time in Queensland, with low unemployment and a growing sense of optimism. There was also renewed religiosity across most denominations throughout Queensland.

In this period, the Methodists sought to expand through "a series of nationalistic, evangelistic campaigns" culminating in the "Mission to the Nation". Carried out between 1953 and 1957, the Mission was the greatest attempt ever made by the Methodist Church to reform the nation, emphasising the Christian faith as the only answer to social and industrial problems. Meetings conducted by campaign leader Reverend Alan Walker were held in capital cities and provincial centres throughout the country. Attracting large crowds, the crusade received wide newspaper and radio coverage. Between 1947 and 1961, the adult membership of the Methodist Church in the Brisbane metropolitan area rose from 5450 to 8251, while the church's Sunday School enrolment doubled in the same period (6414 to 12734). These numbers continued to rise to at least 1966. Meanwhile, Brisbane's population grew by 25 percent during the 1950s and surpassed 0.5 million in 1954.

As part of an Australia-wide church building boom experienced between 1955 and 1965, more churches were constructed in Queensland between 1955 and 1959 than in any other five-year period and church architecture progressed towards more modern forms. Many new Methodist churches, Sunday school halls, and parsonages were constructed throughout Queensland, replacing older buildings and responding to demand in new suburbs and growing regions. The church also erected new buildings to support its various charities and organisations, including: aged-persons homes, hostels, Young People's Department (YPD) Camps, and Kings College at the University of Queensland's St Lucia campus (opened 1955). By the late 1950s, increased income, due to the introduction of weekly money pledges from the congregation, facilitated church building programmes.

The 1950s were also a period of substantial change within the Methodist and other Christian denominations throughout Australia, as they sought to remain relevant to modern society. Coupled with an expansionary building program, this led to a radical departure from established architectural traditions. Reflecting international trends, church designs moved away from historical revival styles and became increasingly influenced by Modernism. Queensland churches 'engaged local architects to create some of the most daring and expressive modern churches in the state.' However, it was still expected that a church would be recognisable as such, resulting in a wide range of variations combining traditional church elements, symbols, and functions with new construction techniques, materials, and forms.

Modernism had emerged as a movement in architecture in Europe in the 1920s and would become the most important new style or philosophy of architecture and design in the 20th century. It embraced the ideals of Functionalism (form follows function), new technologies and the rejection of ornament in an endeavour to create new and appropriate architectural solutions that reflected the social conditions of the time. Modernism emphasised minimalism, limited ornamentation and focused on a rational use of materials, often new ones, and structural innovations, including asymmetrical compositions.

In Queensland, modernist ideas began to be adopted for ecclesiastical architecture in the late 1930s and early 1940s. Three modernist churches were constructed in Queensland before WWII: Shepherd Memorial Church of St Peter's, Proston (1937), Second Church of Christian Scientist, Clayfield (1938), and First Church of Christian Scientist, Brisbane (1941).

In the period 1945–1954, with wartime building restrictions remaining until 1952 and slowing the restart of the building industry, architects spent this time re-establishing their practices and looking to overseas for new ideas.

Churches built at this time demonstrated conservative shifts towards modern architecture with many churches adopting modern influences. However, as the 1950s progressed, traditional church building forms adopted further Modernist features, such as modern brick and metalwork detailing, and shallower roof pitches, while retaining traditional spaces, configurations and motifs. This form has been called "soft" and "humanised" modernism. Ford Hutton and Newell designed the Wilston Methodist Memorial Church during this period. Other examples of "soft" and "humanised" modern churches exist throughout Queensland, such as St Philip's Anglican Church, Annerley (drawings 1952, consecrated 1 December 1955) and St Peter's Church of England, Millmerran (drawings 1952, dedicated 29 October 1955). In addition to designing churches, the practice also spoke publicly on the importance of church architecture, and encouraged architects to make use of new building materials and to develop religious architecture in keeping with the times and the climatic conditions of their locality when Peter Newell addressed the meeting of Brisbane Metropolitan Clergy in 1953. His paper read was published in The Church Chronicle in 1954.

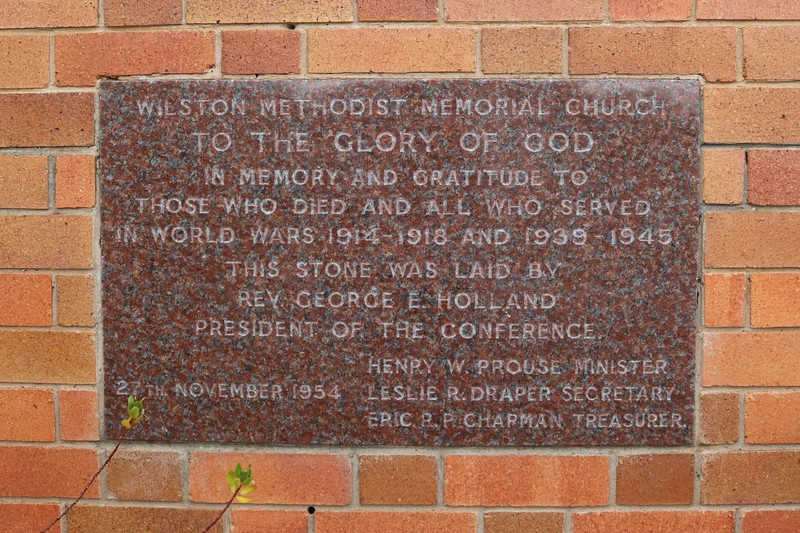
Foundation stone, 2021

By 1953, the Wilston Methodist Church's building programme was progressing. In November that year, the Brisbane City Council gave permission to move the existing church building "to within 12 feet (3.7m) of the Hawdon Street alignment" and in the following year approved a building application for the new church. The foundation stone was laid on 27 November 1954 by Rev. George E Holland, President of the Methodist Conference. A history of the building and contracting firm E Chapman and Sons records that church trustee Rueben Chapman was "involved in the planning, financing, building and with completion and internal fittings".

On 23 April 1956, the opening of the Wilston Methodist Memorial Church by the ex-President of the Methodist Conference, Rev J E Jacob, was attended by more than 1000 people. The building cost £15,000, including a mortgage of £5,000 to repay. Aside from its name, the church had two features that demonstrated the Wilston Methodist Memorial Church's purpose as a war memorial - a memorial or victory tower, and two marble tablets listing the names of congregation members killed during each world war. Most likely designed by Theodore Hutton, the building was constructed by Brian SR Flynn. An electronic carillon was donated "In loving memorial of Phoebe Woollam 1895-1954" by her daughters. Soon after opening, the church featured in Architecture in Australia: Journal of the Royal Australian Institute of Architects, and Cross Section, the newsletter of the University of Melbourne Department of Architecture. The Methodist Times magazine described it as:

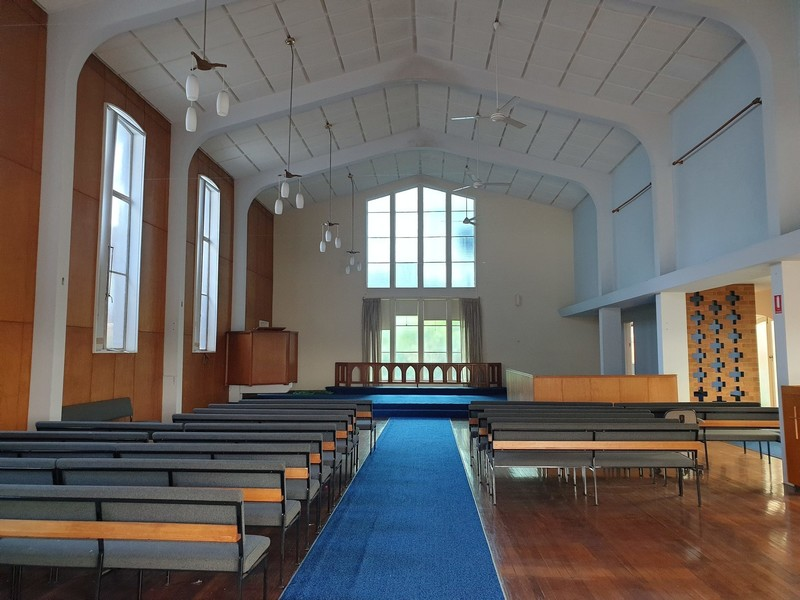
Nave looking south towards the pulpit, 202

ultramodern in design. The memorial tower, 40 feet high [12m], is the most arresting feature of the unusual architecture. An electronic carillon has been installed ... The sanctuary has a large glass window, with an iron guard, in the front wall and a tall window of anti-glare glass in the back wall, behind the communion table. On one side are glass doors which can be opened for ventilation. Five electric light lanterns, unique in style, hang from the ceiling on one side of the church, while on the other side there is concealed lighting. The furniture is of silky oak and the floors are nicely carpeted. The recess for the Communion table, on which is a cross, is approached by three steps with a spacious area in front. The pulpit is at the side and the choir gallery is opposite. There are two large vestries, one for the minister and the other for the choir, each adequately furnished. The surrounding area is laid in lawns, flower beds and concrete paths.

Constructed of concrete-encased steel portal frames finished with face brick, and located on an elevated site on the corner of Hawdon Street and Kedron Brook Road, the Wilston Methodist Memorial Church with its tall tower became a prominent feature in the streetscape when approached along Kedron Brook Road from Days Road.

Wilston Methodist Memorial Church was their first Methodist church designed by Ford Hutton and Newell to open. Between the late 1950s and early 1960s, Ford Hutton and Newell and its successor firms, working for five different denominations, produced more ecclesiastical designs than any other firm in the state, becoming known for their innovative ecclesiastical designs. Ford Hutton and Newell also designed houses, commercial buildings, and government offices. Ford Hutton and Newell evolved into Lund Hutton and Newell c. 1959, then Lund Hutton Newell Black and Paulsen c. 1960.

In 1966, after further fund-raising, the 1913 Wilston Methodist Church, which had been used as a church hall since the opening of the brick building, was modified and modernised. Its understorey was enclosed with brick; a single-storey brick extension was built at the rear; and its front entry porch was replaced with a double-height brick extension with a roof pitch mirroring that of the 1956 church. The new brickwork and design of the additions harmonised with the adjacent Wilston Methodist Memorial Church. This updated church hall was also funded with the assistance of the Australian Government's tax deduction scheme for donations to war memorial funds and was renamed Wilston Methodist Memorial Church Hall.

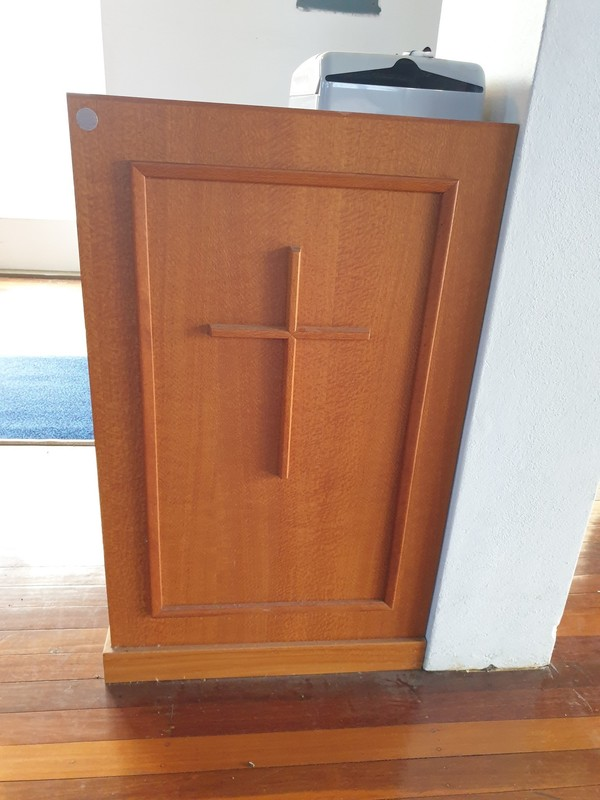
Lectern, 2021

In 1977, when the Uniting Church in Australia was officially formed by the amalgamation of Methodist, Presbyterian and Congregational Churches, Wilston Methodist Memorial Church became a Uniting Church, known as Wilston Memorial Uniting Church. The church's nameplate lettering on the front wall was changed to Wilston Uniting Church around this time. Later the church was renamed became the Trinity-Wilston Memorial Church, and later still became Trinity Grove Uniting Church.

The highly intact former Wilston Methodist Memorial Church retains the principal characteristics of a 1950s Modernist church. Much of its furniture, including, silky oak chancel rail, pulpit, lectern, donations box, telephone box, and noticeboard remain in situ.

Discernible changes to the church since 1956 include addition of: a doorway in the eastern wall of the lobby; fans to the nave ceiling; and a brick columbarium wall (c. 2000) in the western lawn. The ashes have been removed from the columbarium wall since the closure of the church. The memorial tablets dedicating the church to those from the congregation who perished in WWI and WWII have been removed. In 2021, the memorial tablets are in storage. An early timber honour board listing the names of those of the congregation who served during WWII remains fixed to the interior of the front wall of the Wilston Methodist Memorial Church Hall.

The former Wilston Methodist Memorial Church closed in 2019 due to declining congregation numbers. This reflected the trend of falling attendances at the established churches in the late 20th century. In 2021, both the 1956 church and the earlier 1913 church (later used as a hall) remain unused.

== Description ==
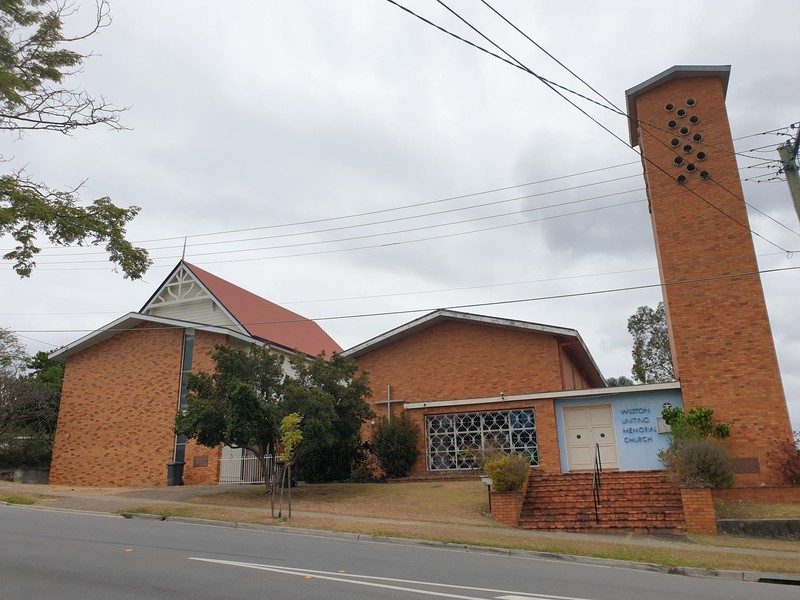
Hawdon Street elevation, 2021

The former Wilston Methodist Memorial Church (1956) is situated in Wilston, 4.5 km northwest of the Brisbane CBD. It stands on a modestly sized corner site (1205m2) bounded by roads on three sides and; faces north to Hawdon Street, with Kedron Brook Road to the west and Dibley Avenue to the East. The church building and tower stands on a raised terrace of land on the western side of the church grounds, with an adjacent hall and toilet block standing on the eastern side.

It has an expressive Modernist style, evident through its asymmetrical massing, refined composition, simple forms and volumes, and use of a restrained materials palette. The church is lowset and comprises a large gable-roofed main block containing a nave and sanctuary with two gable-roofed vestries attached to either side of its rear (south). A tall memorial tower with carillon stands at the northwest corner of the site and is connected to the main block by a walkway under a lower flat roof which also forms an entrance lobby and side aisle to the nave. The main block's structure comprises concrete-encased steel portal frames, expressed on the exterior face-brick walls by bricks laid at 45 degrees.

The front entrance lobby features awning windows with a wrought metal screen and is accessed via a wide face-brick stair with integrated side garden beds. Timber double doors lead into the wide, narrow lobby, which provides access through to the nave, the tower, and a long side aisle to the nave, which doubles as a corridor through to the rear of the church.

The nave is a large, open volume with a raked ceiling and exposed portal frames. On its eastern side are banks of tall windows and on its western side is the side aisle, expressed by a lowered flat ceiling. At the southern end of the nave is the sanctuary dais, raised two steps above the nave floor and accommodating a cantilevered pulpit (east) and a choir stall, part recessed into the side aisle. A face brick wall with a pattern of cross-shaped openings provides a decorative screen between the choir stall and the nave. In the sanctuary's southern wall is a floor-to-ceiling multi-paned window. On either side of the sanctuary is a door into the vestries (minister to the east and choir to the west). An open walkway to the rear (south) of the main block connects the choir and minister vestries. The church retains original and early fixtures, fittings, and furniture including lighting, pulpit, choir stall, and chancel rail.

The side aisle opens through glazed French doors to a western lawn. The lawn slopes toward Kedron-Brook Road and has concrete paths leading from the tower, along the side of the church to the rear of the site.

== Heritage listing ==
The former Wilston Methodist Memorial Church was listed on the Queensland Heritage Register on 12 November 2021 having satisfied the following criteria.

The place is important in demonstrating the evolution or pattern of Queensland's history.

The Wilston Methodist Memorial Church (1956) is a highly intact 1950s Modernist-style church, important in demonstrating the evolution of Methodist Church architecture in Queensland in the post-WWII period. Constructed during a period of growth for the Methodist Church, it is the first Modernist-style Methodist church completed in Queensland, during a transitional period for Modernist church design.

As a mid-20th century memorial church, dedicated to those Australian servicemen from the congregation who perished during WWI and WWII, Wilston Methodist Memorial Church is important in demonstrating community involvement in, and commemoration of, these major world events. It illustrates the preference following WWII for memorialising the sacrifices of war through utilitarian forms, such as memorial halls, libraries, and swimming pools.

The place is important in demonstrating the principal characteristics of a particular class of cultural places.

Highly intact, Wilston Methodist Memorial Church is important in demonstrating the principal characteristics of a 1950s Modernist Church. This aspect of the place's cultural heritage significance is demonstrated in its: all-encompassing and unified modernist aesthetic; restrained materials palette; form and layout expressive of worship practices; and simplified traditional church spaces (nave, sanctuary, vestries), church fixtures, fittings, furniture (including chancel rail, pulpit, and choir stall), and motifs.

The place is important because of its aesthetic significance.

Wilston Methodist Memorial Church has aesthetic importance for its architectural qualities expressive of Methodism's expansionist outlook post-World War II and its desire to remain relevant to Queensland society at the time. These attributes emanate from its cohesive Modernist styling, including its well-composed asymmetrical and simplified exterior forms; the restrained materials palette; the generous scale of the nave volume and its detailing; and the manipulation of light through the placement of windows, use of textured and colour-tinted glass, and arrangement of lights.

== Heritage listing removal ==
The church was removed from the Queensland Heritage Register in 2024 following a court case brought by the Uniting Church in Australia.
