= South Pacific Association of Theological Schools =

The South Pacific Association of Theological Schools (SPATS) is an association of theological colleges in the South Pacific. It was founded in 1969 and emphasises ecumenism.

SPATS publishes the Pacific Journal of Theology.

== Member schools ==
SPATS has 27 member schools in 13 countries: The Marshalls Theological College in the Marshall Islands and the Tangintebu Theological College in Kiribati are included despite being geographically located in the North Pacific.

- Alan Walker College of Evangelism (Australia)
- Bishop Patteson Theological College (Solomon Islands)
- Ecole Pastorale de Bethanie (New Caledonia)
- Ecole Pastorale de Faiere-Hermon (Tahiti)
- Fiji College of Theology & Evangelism
- Fulton College (Fiji)
- Kanana-Fou Theological Seminary (American Samoa)
- Malua Theological College (Samoa)
- Marshalls Theological College (Marshall Islands)
- Methodist Davuilevu Theological College (Fiji)
- Methodist Deaconess Training Centre (Fiji)
- Moamoa Theological College (Samoa)
- Pacific Regional Seminary (Fiji)
- Pacific Theological College (Fiji)
- Piula Theological College (Samoa)
- Salvation Army School for Officer Training (Fiji)
- Seghe Theological Seminary (Solomon Islands)
- Sia’atoutai Theological College (Tonga)
- St. Athanasius Coptic Orthodox Theological College (Fiji)
- St. John the Baptist Theological College (Fiji)
- Takamoa Theological College (Cook Islands)
- Talua Theological Training Institute (Vanuatu)
- Tangintebu Theological College (Kiribati)
- Te Rau Kahikatea (New Zealand)
- The College of the Diocese of Polynesia (New Zealand)
- United Theological College (Australia)
- University of Auckland School of Theology (New Zealand)
