= Fulton College =

Fulton College may refer to:

- Fulton College (Fiji), a Seventh-day Adventist tertiary institution
- Fulton College Preparatory School, Van Nuys, California
- Fulton–Montgomery Community College, a two-year college in Johnstown, New York
- Ira A. Fulton College of Engineering and Technology at Brigham Young University
- Mary Lou Fulton Teachers College, part of Arizona State University
- Westminster College, Missouri, formerly known as Fulton College
