= Siaʻatoutai Theological College =

Theological seminary in Tonga

Coordinates: 21.135°S 175.255°W

- Motto: "Ke Kalaisi’ia mo Kelesi’ia ‘etau langa ki ‘Itāniti."
- Motto in English: "Through Christ and Grace we build to Eternity."
- Type: Private seminary
- Established: 1948; 78 years ago
- Religious affiliation: Free Wesleyan Church of Tonga
- Principal: Rev. Dr. Paula Onoafe Lātū
- Location: Tonga
- Campus: Rural
- Website: siaatoutai.fwc.to

Siaʻatoutai Theological College is a theological seminary in Tonga. It was established in 1948 by the Free Wesleyan Church of Tonga, as a separate institution from Tupou College. The College is a member of the South Pacific Association of Theological Schools, and offers a Bachelor of Divinity programme accredited by the same. As of 2016, more than 190 students attend the college.

== History ==
The College was established in 1948 at the grounds of Nafualu, which had been the location of Tupou College since its removal from Nuku'alofa in 1921, under the patronage of Queen Sālote Tupou III. The grounds on which the College now stands is of historical and cultural significance as it was once the site of Ma'ananga, the residence of the famed Tu'i Ha'amea, Lo'au, who invented the royal kava-drinking ceremony, the Taumafa Kava.

Prior to the establishment of Sia'atoutai, the theological instruction of ministers was undertaken at the Methodist secondary school, Tupou College, where the principal, the Reverend A. Harold Wood, fulfilled the dual roles of secondary school executive and tertiary educator. Ministers would gather at Tupou College for lectures and tutoring conducted by the principal in the evening, when the school day had ended for secondary scholars. The Church at the time was still grappling with the challenges of having to train and equip a spontaneously enlarged body of clergy following the reunion of the Wesleyan and Free Churches in May 1924. And so, with the inauguration of a new theological institution, the Church realised one of its long-awaited goals in seeking to improve the education of its ministers and workers by providing a proper space for learning.
