= Wilston State School =

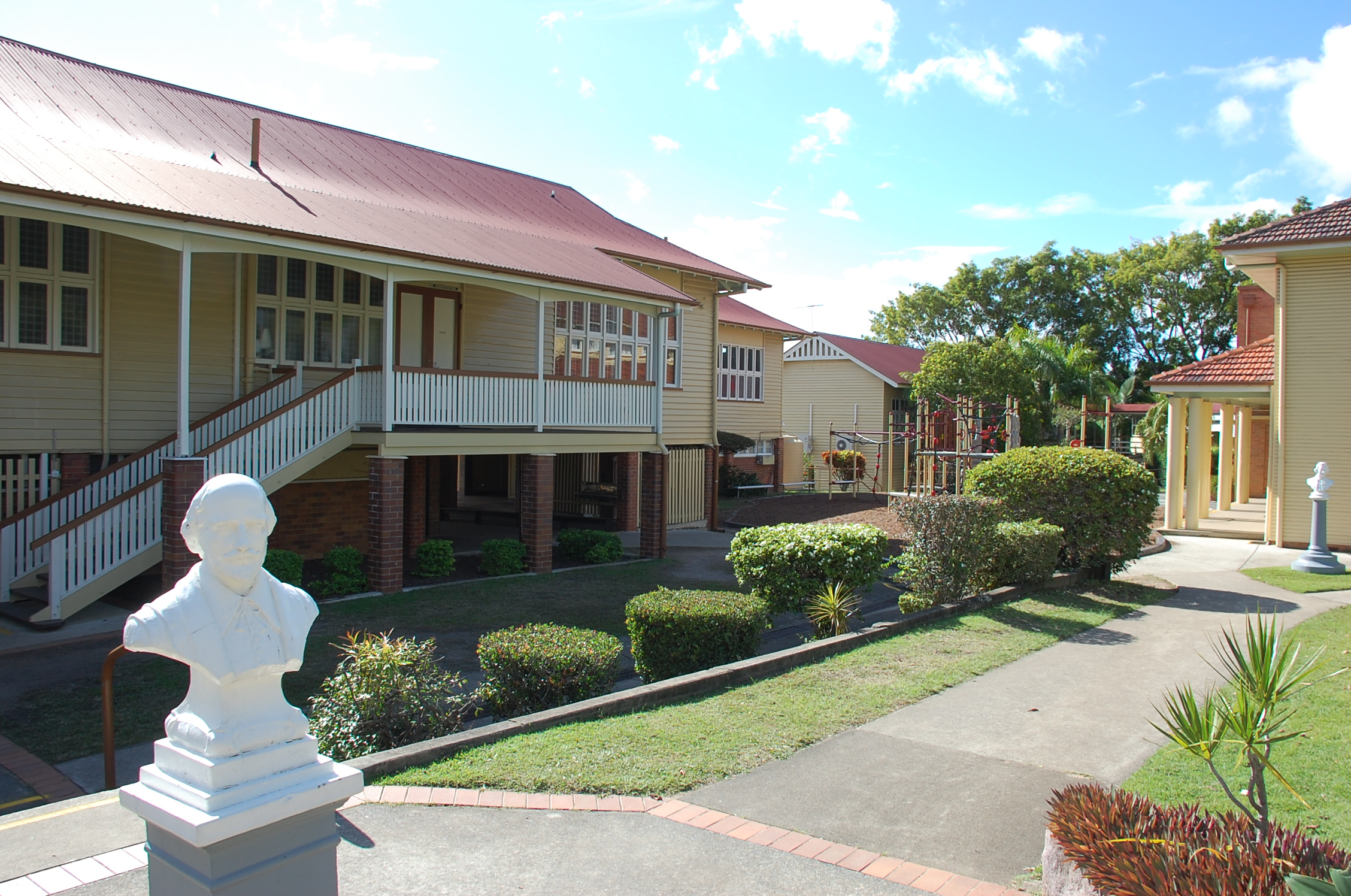
- Wilston State School, 2009

- Location within Queensland
- 27.4280°S 153.0153°E
- Location: Primrose Street, Grange, City of Brisbane, Queensland, Australia

History
- Design period: 1914–1919 (World War I)
- Built: 1920–1954

Site notes
- Architect(s): Arthur Gordon Femister Greenway, Blackburne and Gzell

Queensland Heritage Register
- Official name: Wilston State School
- Type: state heritage
- Designated: 12 June 2015
- Reference no.: 602855
- Type: Education, research, scientific facility: school-state
- Theme: Educating Queenslanders: Providing primary schooling

Wilston State School is a heritage-listed state school at Primrose Street, Grange, City of Brisbane, Queensland, Australia. It was built from 1920. Architects who designed the school's buildings include Arthur Gordon Femister Greenway and Blackburne and Gzell. It was added to the Queensland Heritage Register on 12 June 2015.

== History ==
Wilston State School opened in 1920 in the Brisbane suburb of Wilston (but now within the suburb boundaries of Grange), to serve the growing suburban population in the Wilston-Grange area. Due to suburban development during the interwar period and after World War II, additional buildings were added to serve the school's needs. Wilston State School has a range of standard and purpose-built timber and brick buildings dating from 1920 to the 1950s, set in landscaped grounds. The school has been in continuous operation since establishment and has been a focus for the local community as a place for important social and cultural activities.

The provision of state-administered education was important to the colonial governments of Australia. Following the introduction of Queensland's Education Act 1860, which established the Board of General Education and began standardising curriculum, training and facilities, Queensland's public schools grew rapidly. Queensland's State Education Act 1875 provided for free, compulsory and secular primary education and established the Department of Public Instruction. This further standardised the provision of education, and despite difficulties, achieved the remarkable feat of bringing basic literacy to most Queensland children by 1900.

The establishment of schools was considered an essential step in the development of early communities and integral to their success. Locals often donated land and labour for a school's construction and the school community contributed to maintenance and development. Schools became a community focus, a symbol of progress, and a source of pride, with enduring connections formed with past pupils, parents, and teachers. The inclusion of war memorials and community halls reinforced these connections and provided a venue for a wide range of community events in schools across Queensland.

To help ensure consistency and economy, the Queensland Government developed standard plans for its school buildings. From the 1860s until the 1960s, Queensland school buildings were predominantly timber-framed, an easy and cost-effective approach that also enabled the government to provide facilities in remote areas. Standard designs were continually refined in response to changing needs and educational philosophy and Queensland school buildings were particularly innovative in climate control, lighting, and ventilation. Standardisation produced distinctly similar schools across Queensland with complexes of typical components.

European settlement of the area around Wilston State School began when William Wilson, a city merchant, took up 300 acres of land and built a stone house c. 1876, which he called "Wilston" after his birthplace in Ireland. The later suburb, located between Newmarket and Windsor, took the name of Wilson's house. During the 19th century, Wilston remained a predominantly rural area.

Suburban growth intensified with the arrival of the railway at nearby Newmarket in 1897. In 1899 the Ferny Grove railway line was extended to Enoggera and the Town of Windsor, incorporating Wilston, was proclaimed in 1904. The suburb, near the Newmarket saleyards (1877–1931), was at first regarded as an outlying district of Newmarket, and was used for agistment, tanneries, fellmongering, dairying and extractive industries. The train line to Newmarket station had a stop at Wilston, and settlement spread northwards from there to the desirable elevated slopes of Eildon Hill. The population of Wilston increased further following establishment of the Grange electric tramway along Days Road in 1928.

Lobbying for a new school at Wilston began in 1912. The neighbouring schools of Bowen Bridge State School (now Windsor State School) and Newmarket State School had resisted the establishment of another school, fearing it would decrease resources for existing schools in the area. In 1914, a further effort was made to have a school erected in the district, pointing out that the steep nature of the area was difficult for small children; and crossing the railway and passing cattle saleyards were added dangers. By 1917, two potential sites for a new school had been selected. Coronation Park, a recreation area, was selected after a secret ballot of parents.

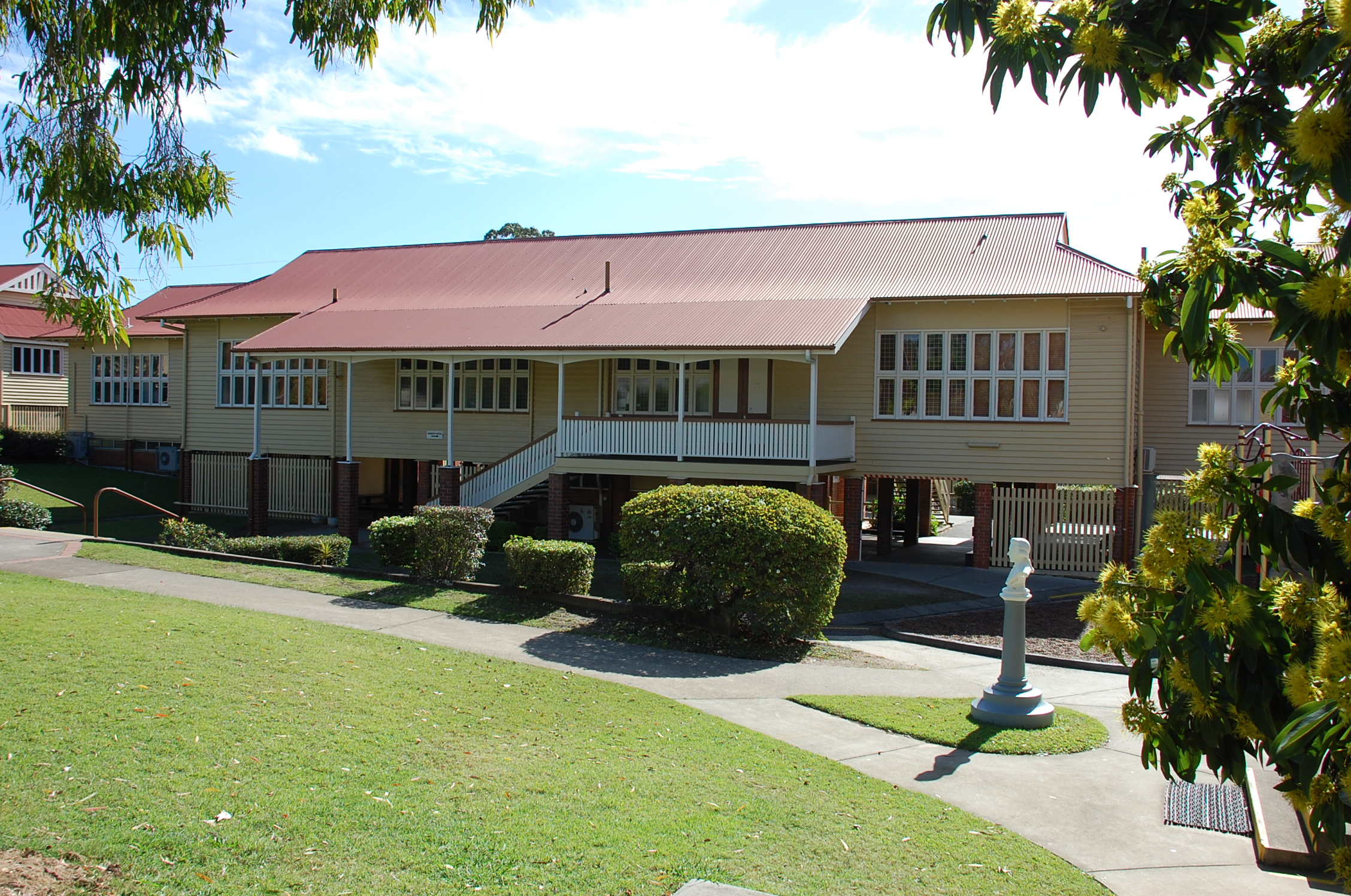
Block C, from Primrose Street, 2009

Subsequently, Wilston State School opened on 14 August 1920, comprising one suburban timber school building (Type C/T8) (now known as Block C) on 4 acres of land (1.62ha). The building was centrally positioned on the higher ground at the southern (Primrose Street) end of the site. A newspaper report described the building as timber on brick piers with an asbestos slate roof and ornamental fleches. There were 8 classrooms with verandahs and two teachers rooms on the north side. Particular reference was made to good lighting and ventilation. The concreted area under the building was used as play space, with conveniently placed toilets nearby. The school had an initial enrolment of 320 pupils, which rose with the progress of the district.

The school gained a reputation for success in the arts and music, due largely to the efforts of the first head teacher, Walter Collings. His influence played an important role in the development of the school and its grounds. He is recognised for his public stance in opposing corporal punishment in schools and Wilston was reputedly the first school in Queensland to ban corporal punishment. By the late 1920s, the school possessed its own orchestra. Reflecting the school's arts focus, in 1923 a bust of William Shakespeare, located in a garden bed on the north side of the 1920 building, was unveiled by the Queensland Governor, Sir Matthew Nathan.

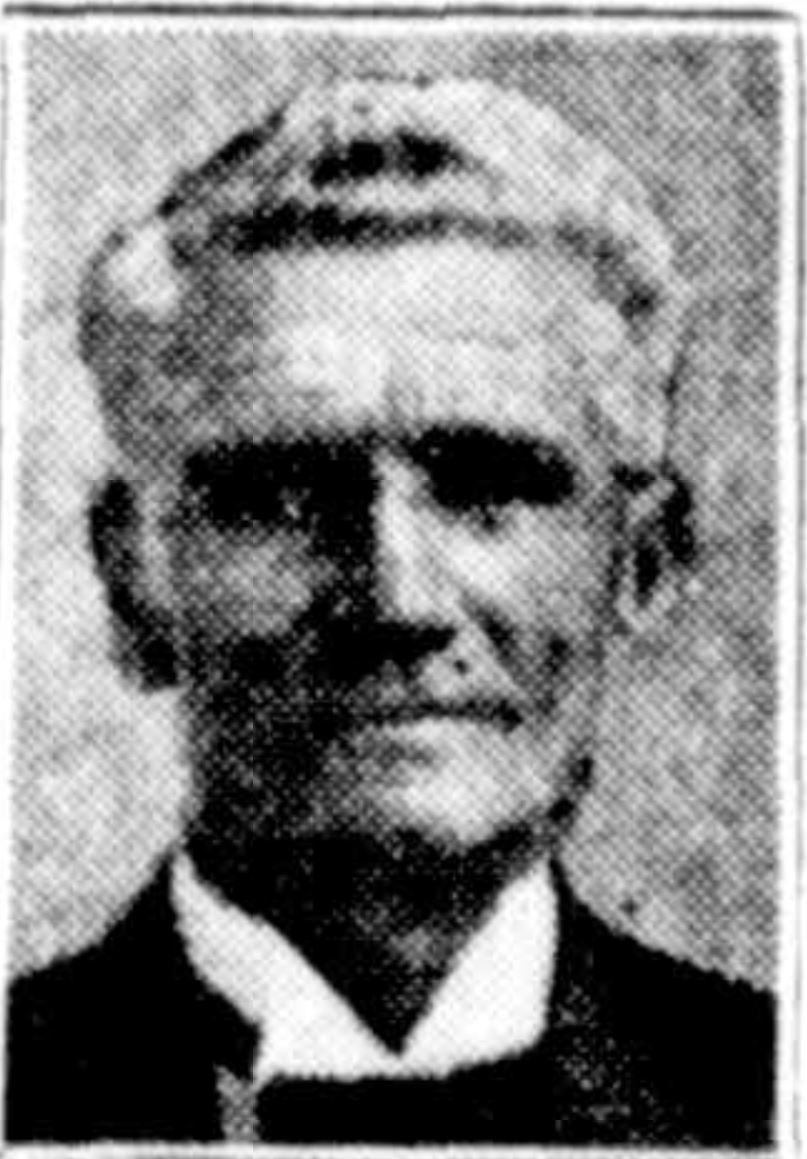
Walter Collings, head teacher from 1920 to 1939

Collings also promoted sport. One of the first swimming pools at a state school in Queensland was established at Wilston State School in 1923, located in the southwest corner of the grounds. The school committee raised its £650 cost and undertook preliminary work on the site before its construction by MR Hornibrook. Opened on 10 November 1923 at a large public gathering, the reinforced concrete pool was 23 metres (75 ft) long and 7.6 metres (25 ft) wide with a varied depth of 1–2.1 metres (3 ft 3 in – 6 ft 11 in). Earlier pools were opened at Junction Park State School (1910), Wooloowin State School (1916), Ascot State School (pre-1921) and Cannon Hill State School (1921). In 1915, the Hon Herbert Hardacre, Minister for Public Instruction, regarded swimming as "preferable to other physical drill during the hot summer months" and that he "would like to see a swimming pool in every school ground in Queensland". A year later at the opening of the Wooloowin State School pool, he emphasised the value of swimming to children's physiques. However, water safety was also a motivation for the establishment school swimming pools. A year after the opening of the Wilston State School pool, a long timber dressing shed with a brick base, weatherboard walls and a gable roof was built to the west of the pool and was officially opened in October 1924. In August 1929, tennis courts were officially opened by the Minister for Education, Reginald King.

The provision of outdoor play space was a result of the early and continuing commitment by the Department of Public Instruction to play-based education, particularly in primary school. Trees and gardens were planted as part of beautification of schools. In the 1870s, schools inspector William Boyd was critical of tropical schools and among his recommendations stressed the importance of adding shade trees to playgrounds. In addition, Arbor Day celebrations began in Queensland in 1890. Landscape elements were often constructed to standard designs and were intrinsic to Queensland Government education philosophies. Educators believed gardening and Arbor Days instilled in young minds the value of hard work and activity, improved classroom discipline, developed aesthetic tastes, and inspired people to stay on the land. Aesthetically designed gardens were encouraged by regional inspectors. Following construction of Wilston State School, its grounds were terraced and gardens with bush houses were created. Principal Collings expressed the importance of school gardens in July 1932 at the opening of the latest part of the school's beautification scheme, which had commenced 12 years previously, when he said "a beautiful garden was better than the best teacher". Shade trees inside the school boundary near the buildings on Inglis Street (fig trees) and Thomas streets (two camphor laurels and one fig tree) were planted prior to 1946. Fig trees around the oval, along the Inglis, Carberry and Thomas streets' boundaries, were planted prior to 1964.

Attention to improving light and ventilation to achieve optimum classroom conditions culminated in 1920 with the sectional school type, a highset timber structure. This design combined all the best features of previous types and implemented theories of an ideal education environment. It proved very successful and was used unaltered until 1950. It was practical, economical, and satisfied educational requirements and climatic needs. Most importantly, it allowed for the orderly expansion of schools over time. Before the sectional school, solar orientation was not given priority and all school buildings were oriented in relation to the street and property boundaries, often resulting in poor lighting. The sectional school type had only one verandah typically on the northern side, allowing the southern wall, with a maximum number of windows, to be unobstructed. The building was designed so that the blank western wall was removable. As the school grew, the western end wall could be detached and the building extended in sections, hence the name. This led to the construction of long narrow buildings of many classrooms - a distinctive feature of Queensland schools.

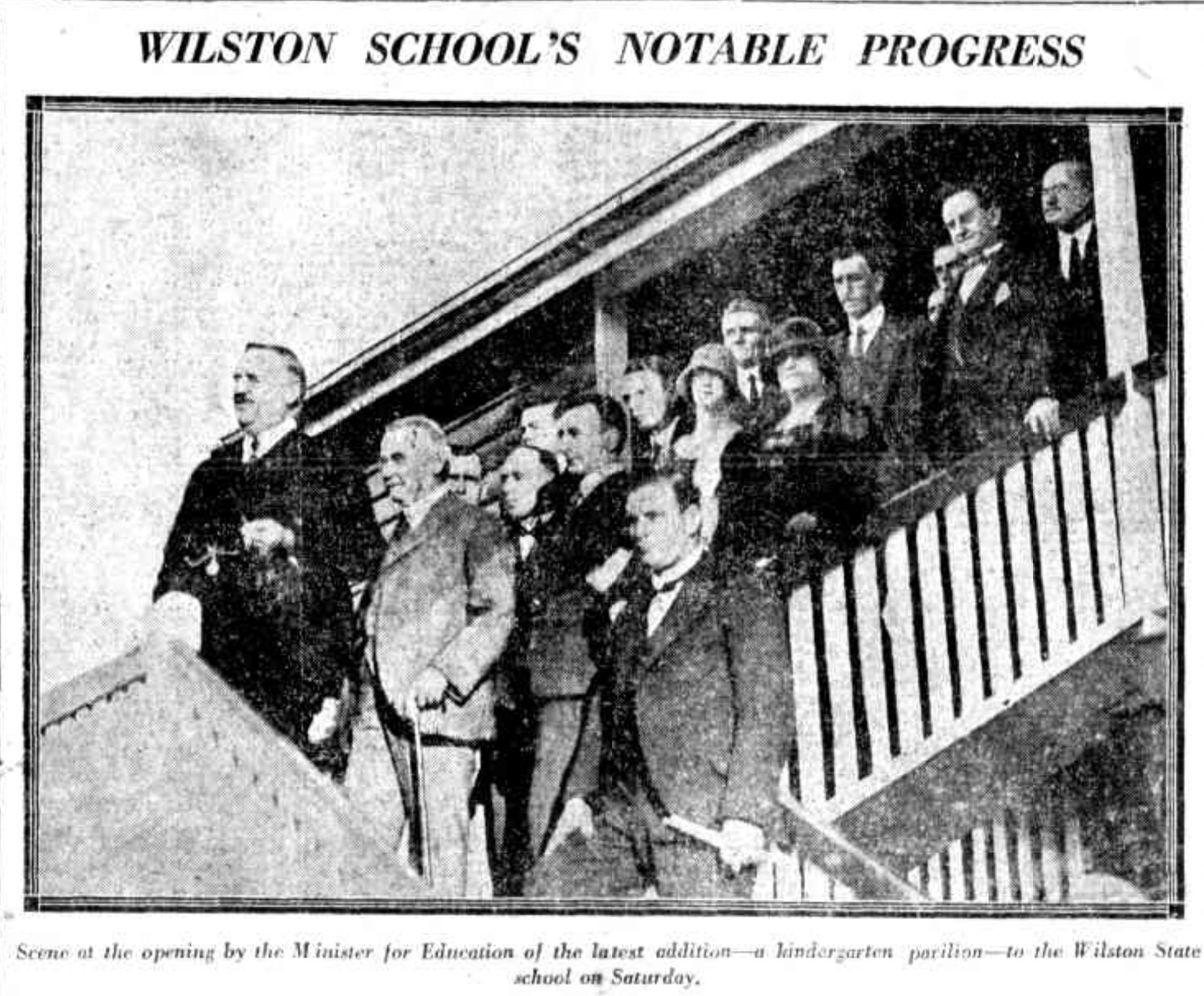
Opening of the kindergarten, 1926

In 1926 a sectional school building (Type D/T1) was constructed to the northwest of the 1920 school building as a kindergarten wing (now known as Block A). It contained three standard-size classrooms and one double-size classroom and was intended to accommodate 300 children. Typical of the sectional school type, it was highset with blank end walls, a north-facing verandah, large banks of windows in the southern wall, and a projecting teachers room.

The commitment of the school principal, Collings, to the development of music and the arts was the likely motivation behind the construction of a new, multi-purpose classroom and concert hall building that was not a standard Queensland Government type. Plans were prepared by architect AGF Greenaway in 1933. Working for the Department of Public Works at the time, Greenaway, who was born in Ipswich in 1894, had previously worked with Brockwell Gill in Ipswich and the Brisbane City Council, and registered as an architect in 1929.

The Governor of Queensland, Sir Leslie Wilson, opened the new purpose-built building (now known as Block D) on 23 September 1933. Located to the northeast of the 1920 building, it was more like a church hall than a school building in form, with a porch at the west end, two double classrooms in the body of the building, separated by a partition, and a classroom on a platform at the east end with a teachers room and lobby each side. There were no verandahs. The roof was gabled with a fleche and windows were standard school casements with fanlights. The classrooms were 12.1 metres (40 ft) wide with a trussed roof.

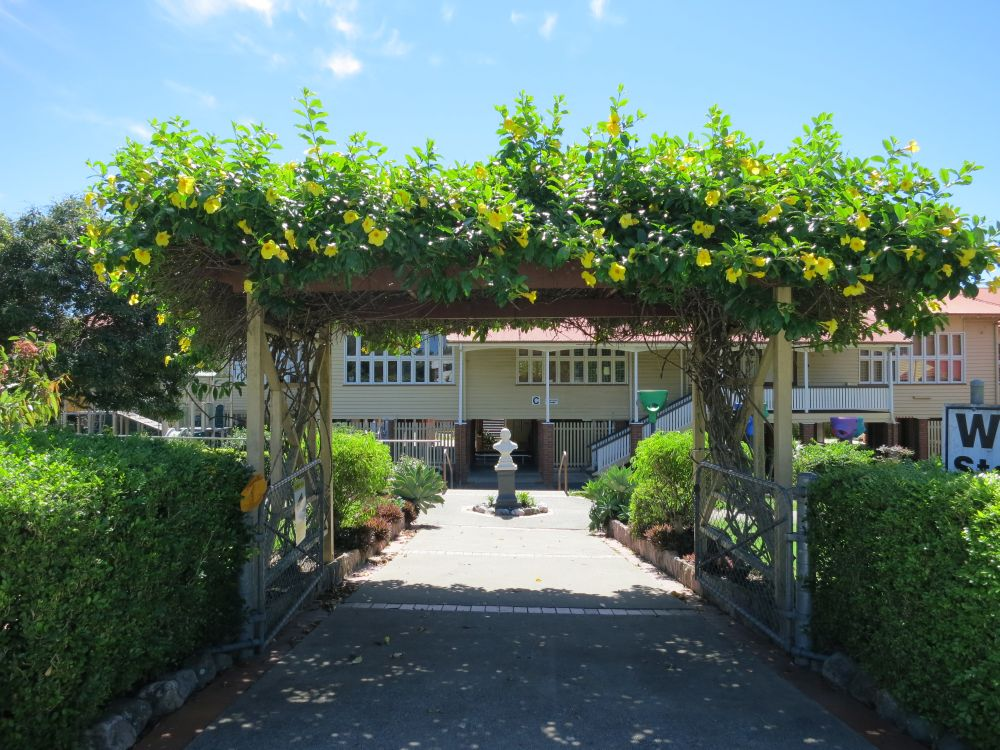
Primrose Street entrance with pergola, 2015

During the 1930s changes and additions to the grounds occurred. Around 1934 new toilets were constructed under the original 1920 building and the 1926 infants wing, and two acres of additional land was acquired from Coronation Park to the north for a sports oval in 1937. Landscaping works, including a terraced lawn, concrete stairs, garden beds and a pergola at the main (Primrose Street) entrance, were undertaken by relief labour in 1932 as part of an ongoing school beautification scheme. This stage included the unveiling of a bust of Captain Cook, the work of James Arthur Watts, in a garden bed next to the pergola on 2 July 1932. Further landscaping included a concrete retaining wall and balustrade around the parade area north of the 1920 building in 1933. In 1935 a set of gates, constructed on the Thomas Street boundary, were funded through community fundraising and a donation from the noted manufacturer and philanthropist, George Marchant, who lived in the vicinity. These gates consisted of concrete pillars with iron gates and an archway. They were officially opened on 21 September 1935. In the same year, art deco-style balustrading was added to retaining walls north of the infants wing.

For most Brisbane suburbs, the immediate post-World War II period was one of development with the consequent rise in school populations due to the "baby boom"; as was the case for Wilston State School. After World War II the overriding concern for the Department of Public Instruction was the need to build school buildings as expeditiously and economically as possible. Queensland schools were faced with enormous overcrowding and a lack of resources as the Queensland Government gave education a low priority and provided the department with only a small budget. At the same time, skilled labour was scarce and materials were in short supply.

In this immediate post-war period two 1922 Sectional buildings (now known as blocks B and E) were relocated c. 1949 to the site from Kelvin Grove Boys School, to accommodate Wilston State School's growing population. Each contained two classrooms with an L-shaped verandah, and were positioned to the west and east of the 1920 building (Block C). In c. 1953 the eastern building (Block E) was extended at either end. The original eastern wall was relocated to the eastern extent of the extension and fabric from the original, western verandah was reused in the extensions. The original hatroom was relocated to the western corner of the new verandah. The extensions had large banks of timber casements in the southern walls, with timber sashes in the verandah walls. A curved pathway running between blocks C and E was repositioned to accommodate the extension.

In 1954 another purpose-designed building (now known as Block G), was constructed near the Primrose Street boundary, southeast of the 1920 building. School fund-raising for it had begun in 1941 and by 1953, a plan for a £6250 new Visual Education Centre and Library was published in The Courier Mail. Half of the building cost was funded by the school's fund-raising efforts and half by the Queensland Government. Designed by Brisbane firm, Blackburne and Gzell Architects, it was a two-storey timber building with a terracotta roof and a two-storey brick entrance porch. The building was officially opened in 1954 by Queensland Premier, Vince Gair.

From the 1950s various alterations and additions occurred and more buildings were added to the southern school grounds. In the period 1951–5, a lowset, single-room classroom (Block F) was constructed to the south of Block E, on a diagonal axis. In 1956 the building was extended by two classrooms to the west, and after 2006 it was raised and moved to its present position along the Primrose Street boundary. In 1956 additional toilets were constructed beneath the 1920 building (Block C) in a style similar to the existing 1930s toilets. A highset classroom building was constructed next to the pool in 1970 (Block H), on the site of a former terraced lawn. The 1933 purpose-built building (Block D) was converted into a library in 1983.

In 1970, as the school's Jubilee project, the swimming pool was widened to six lanes and lengthened to 25 metres (82 ft). At the time, the pool represented 48 years of swimming history at the school and the pool update was considered a suitable commemoration to all who contributed to it. This project was funded jointly by the Wilston State School P & C and the Queensland Government.

In the 1990s several buildings were refurbished and altered to suit new uses. In 1993, the central wing of the 1920 building (Block C) was refurbished for administration purposes, with some modification to joinery and new partitions inserted. The top level of windows on the south-facing walls were either removed or sheeted over. A new staircase, landing and door were added to the southern wall of the central wing, creating a new main entrance to the building. The internal layout of the former teachers room, which had been extended in 1973, was altered to create offices, a store room and a sick bay. In 1997 the verandahs of the east and west wings were enclosed and large openings cut into the verandahs walls. Also in 1997, part of the verandah of the 1926 sectional school building (Block A) was enclosed and the teachers room and classrooms were refurbished, including the removal of a classroom partition.

Additions and changes to landscape elements have also been made. From the 1950s stone pitched walls were constructed in various locations as retaining walls, including the bank to the north of the 1933 purpose-built building (Block D). The wall to the oval was partly stone pitched by 1959. A bell tower housing the school bell beside the sectional school building (Block A) dates from before September 1939. Alterations to pathways and gardens between the 1920 building (Block C) and Primrose Street took place in the 1990s, including the realignment of the main entrance gate and pathway.

The importance of the school to the local community has been demonstrated by the support given by parents in the development of buildings, the beautification of the grounds, and continuity of attendance, with several generations of local families attending.

In 2015, the school continues to operate from its original site. It retains standard and purpose-built timber and brick buildings dating from 1920 to the 1950s, set in landscaped grounds. The school is important as a focus for the surrounding community and generations of students from the area have been taught there. Since establishment, it has been a key social focus for the community with the grounds and buildings being the site of many social events.

== Description ==
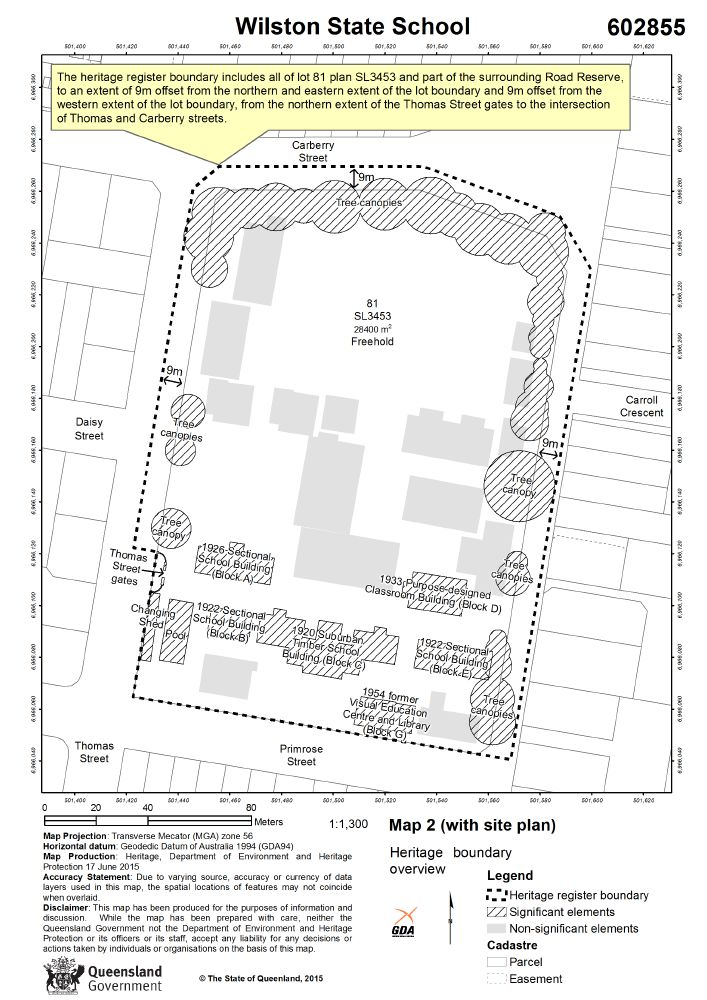
Site map, 2015

Wilston State School occupies the whole of a 2.84ha block within the hilly terrain of The Grange, a residential suburb of Brisbane. The site is bounded by Primrose Street to the south, Inglis Street to the east, Thomas Street to the west and Carberry Street to the north. The school comprises a large complex of buildings on a sloping site, with the earliest school buildings located on the high ground at the southern end of the site, more recent development in the centre, and playing fields on the low ground at the north end. In addition to the early buildings are entrance gates on the Thomas Street boundary (1935) and a swimming pool (1923) with dressing shed (1924) in the southwest corner. Other site features include concrete busts of historical figures (1923 and 1932), balustrade walls (1933 and 1935), retaining walls (c. 1940s), stone pitched walls, an east–west driveway, pathways, and established trees and landscaping.

The six significant buildings within the school complex are all timber-framed and clad, and orientated on an east–west axis. These buildings are:

- Block C - 1920 suburban timber school building
- Block A - a 1926 sectional school building
- Block D - a 1933 purpose-designed classroom and hall building
- Block B - a c1922 sectional school building
- Block E, extended c1953 - a c1922 Sectional School Building
- Block G - a 1954 former Visual Education Centre and Library.

Evidence of early site planning of the school grounds remains, with all significant buildings (except for Block G) positioned symmetrically in relation to Block C, the original 1920 building, which occupies a central position in the southern school grounds. Blocks A and D lie to the northwest and northeast of Block C respectively, positioned in line with each other with a former parade ground in between. Blocks B and E (a matching pair of buildings added to the site in c. 1949) are positioned in line with Block C at its west (Block B) and east (Block E) ends. Block B stands close to Block C due to the limited space available between it and the swimming pool in the southwest corner of the grounds, while Block E had sufficient space around it to be extended at either end in c. 1953. Block G is located to the southeast of Block C and its north-facing main entrance is aligned with the gap between blocks C and E.

With the exception of Block G, all of the significant school buildings are weatherboard-clad, highset on either brick or concrete piers, and have corrugated metal-clad roofs. Blocks C, A, B and E are rectangular in plan and have north-facing verandahs; large banks of glazing on the southern elevations to provide maximum natural light to the interiors; and a range of early timber joinery. All buildings have timber floorboards and timber skirtings of a simple profile. In general, eaves, verandah ceilings, and internal walls and ceilings are lined with timber v-jointed (VJ) tongue-and-groove (T&G) boards, with flat sheeting used for some 1950s classrooms. Blocks C, A, B and the central portion of block E have coved ceilings, exposed metal tie rods and square ceiling ventilation panels (most now enclosed). Elements not of cultural heritage significance include lifts, modern carpet and linoleum floor coverings, inserted partitions, kitchenettes, modern benches and storage cupboards, and aluminium windows.

=== 1920 Suburban Timber School building (Block C) ===
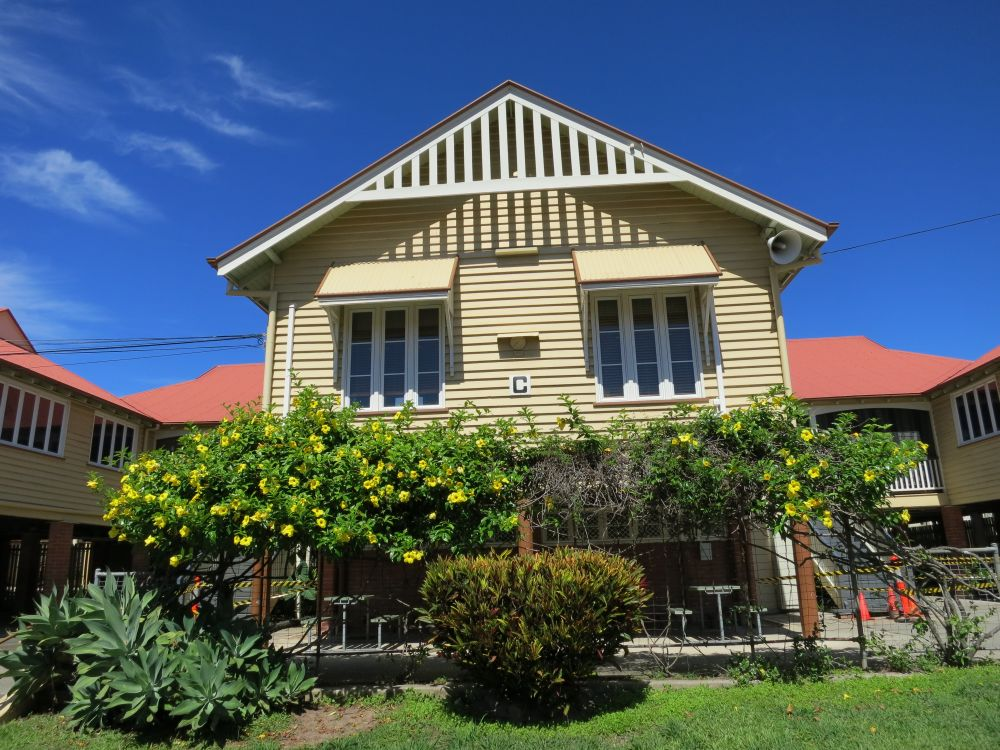
Projecting teachers'room, Block C, 2015

Block C is a large, symmetrically arranged block comprising a central wing (formerly 4 classrooms, now used as offices), two end wings (containing 2 classrooms each), and a projecting teachers room (extended c. 1973) on the north side of the central wing. The wings are connected by continuous verandahs along the northern sides, sections of which are enclosed. The wings have gambrel roofs and the teachers room has a gable roof. Four sets of stairs and a modern lift provide access to the verandahs and a recent covered staircase is attached to the south side of the central wing.

Banks of windows in the south walls of all wings have casements in the bottom row and horizontally centre-pivoting windows above. The east and west wings retain a top row of fanlights that are top-hinged and set within inclined frames (sheeted over on the exterior). Each end wall has three small, high, centre-pivoting windows. The teachers' room has modern aluminium casement windows in timber framing with early square timber fanlights above, shaded by timber-framed, skillion-roofed hoods on the north elevation.

The central wing verandah has a two-rail slat balustrade, curved timber arches between verandah posts, a raked ceiling and a single skin verandah wall. Early timber joinery includes tall, horizontally centre-pivoting fanlights over doorways and later sash windows with fanlights. Verandahs to the east and west wings have been partially enclosed by weatherboards. The interiors are lined and large openings have been cut into the verandah walls.

Classrooms in the east and west wings are separated by original timber partitions with fixed glazing, and walls have picture rails. Multiple new partitions have been added to the central wing but original partitions survive under modern linings. All partitions in the central wing have high-level fixed glazing. The teachers' room has a flat ceiling and partitions have been relocated.

The understorey has a concrete slab floor and is partially enclosed by timber batten screens and brick infill walls. The piers are glazed brown bricks with rounded edges. The understorey accommodates several toilet blocks dating from the 1930s and 1950s. These have brick external walls and timber partitions of vertical timber boards. Beneath the west wing a large room and two store rooms have been constructed at different periods from various materials, including wide vertical timber boards. Several long timber benches are located beneath the central wing.

=== 1926 sectional school building (Block A) ===
Block A is a long building with a projecting teachers room attached to the verandah. It has a gable roof with vertical batten gable infill, and raked eaves. The east and west walls are windowless. Access is via two timber staircases to the verandah.

The verandah has a timber, two-rail slat balustrade, a raked ceiling and a single skin verandah wall. Former hat room enclosures of single-skin weatherboard walls survive at either end, and bag hooks are attached to the verandah wall.

The building retains much of its original timber joinery. The south wall has five banks of casement windows with fanlights. The projecting teachers' room has pairs of casement windows with fanlights above, protected by skillion-roofed hoods. The verandah wall has five sets of double doors with fanlights alternated with five pairs of three-light sash windows with fanlights.

The interior comprises two large classrooms and one smaller classroom. Two single-skin partition walls survive, and the location of a removed partition is evident in the ceiling of the western room. The former teachers room has been enlarged by the removal of its southern wall to incorporate a section of enclosed verandah.

The understorey has a concrete slab floor and is partially enclosed by timber batten screens and brick infill walls. The piers are glazed brown bricks with rounded edges. A 1930s/50s toilet block with brick external walls and timber dividing partitions is at the eastern end and the western end has been enclosed for store rooms.

=== 1933 purpose-designed former classroom and hall building (Block D) ===
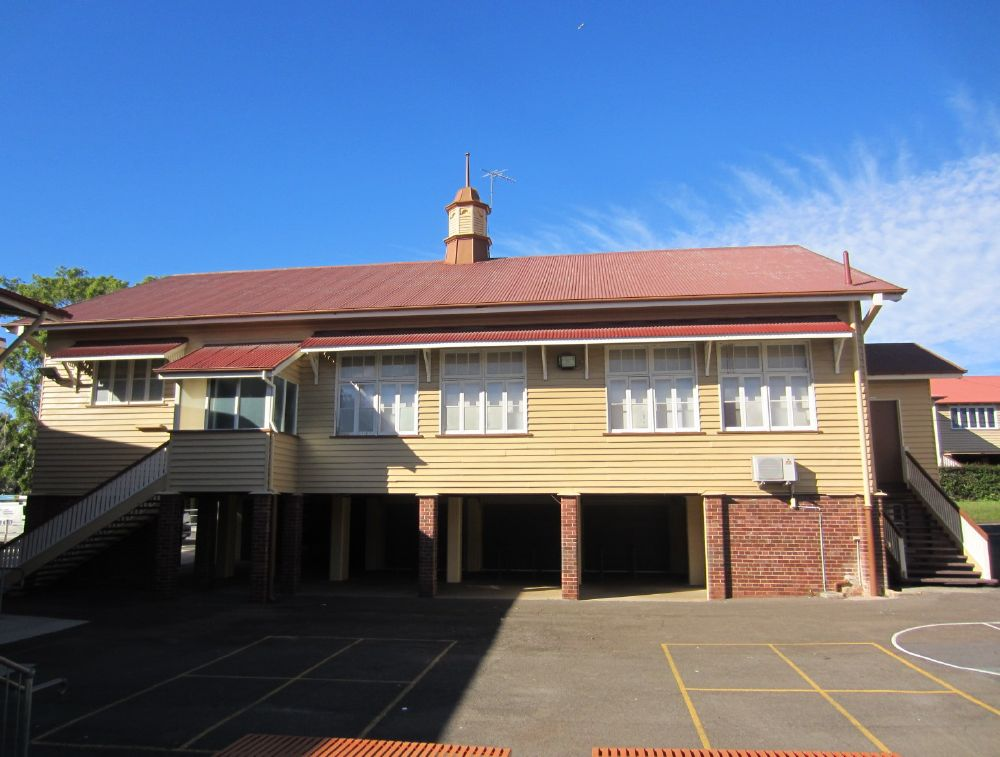
Former hall and classrooms, 2015

The 1933 purpose-designed former classroom and hall building ('Block D') stands on brick stumps and walls. The building is rectangular in plan, with a projecting, central porch on the western side and projecting stair landings at the eastern end of the north and south sides; the building and western porch have gable roofs with vertically battened timber gable-ends. A prominent fleche and spaced eaves-cladding along the northern and southern elevations ventilate the roof space. Most windows are timber-framed casements with (now fixed) fanlights, sheltered by corrugated metal hoods with timber brackets. There are four sets of timber stairs; two to the eastern end projections, and two to the west.

The interior comprises a large central space; with an enclosed western porch; and an eastern raised stage and kitchenette (formerly one space) flanked to the north and the south by hallways and former teachers rooms. Most walls and ceilings are lined with T&G VJ timber boards; stud framing is exposed in sections of the teacher's rooms. Bulkhead partitions in the central space are in the locations where original folding partitions have been removed (one in the centre of the space and one at the stage opening). Beams in this space are expressed and clad in VJ timber boards. Ceiling vents remain in their original positions and high-level, timber picture-rails run around the perimeter of the space. Original timber panelled doors with fanlights provide access to the teachers rooms and hallways.

The understorey has rounded brick stumps, brick walls, and a concrete slab floor. There is an early timber door to the space below the western porch, and early windows include timber-framed sashes.

=== c. 1922 sectional school building (Block B) (relocated c. 1950) ===
Block B has an L-shaped verandah along the north and east sides (enclosed on the east side), a gable roof with vertical batten gable infill, and raked eaves. The building stands on concrete piers and the understory is enclosed with timber batten screens. Access is via a staircase to the north verandah and a recently installed lift and platform connecting the verandah to the pool area to the west.

The verandah has a timber, two-rail dowel balustrade, a raked ceiling and a single skin verandah wall with bag hooks. Fabric from a former hat room located in the northeast corner of the verandah has been incorporated into the verandah enclosure.

Early windows include timber sashes with fanlights in the verandah wall, and two large banks of timber-framed windows on the south wall, consisting of casements on the bottom row, horizontally centre-pivoting windows in the middle and fanlights at the top. Doors in the verandah wall each have two tall, horizontally centre-pivoting fanlights. A double door at the western end of the verandah is the only early door and retains its original handle.

The interior comprises two classrooms divided by a single-skin partition, and the enclosed verandah contains a modern kitchen area and office.

=== c. 1922 sectional school Building (Block E), extended c. 1953 ===
The c. 1922 sectional school building with 1953 extensions to the east and west ends ('Block E') stands on concrete and steel stumps. It has gable roof with battened gable-infills. Windows in the south wall are associated with the different construction periods; banks of tall, timber-framed, sash and horizontally centre-pivoting windows with fanlights to the central 1922 section; and banks of dual, timber-framed casement windows with awning fanlights to the 1953 end sections.

The verandah has a raked ceiling, single skin verandah wall and bag-racks between square timber posts. Part of the ceiling is flat over the 1953 verandahs. A line in the ceiling lining at the western end marks the position of the original verandah roofline. The west end of the verandah has a hat room enclosure with exposed stud framing (repositioned from the 1922 verandah), and a small section of early two-rail dowel balustrade is retained at the eastern end. Verandah windows are double-hung with timber sashes and awning fanlights. Timber low-waisted doors with early hardware are retained. Doors to the 1922 section have tall, centre-pivoting fanlights, while doors to the extensions have awning fanlights.

The interior is divided into three classrooms, with the extent of the western classroom overlapping both the 1953 and 1922 sections. Although openings have been cut into original walls, the early layout is readable. The walls and ceilings of the 1953 sections are lined with flat sheeting with square cover-strips to the walls and curved cover strips to the ceilings.

The understorey has a concrete slab floor and a modern enclosure at the southwest end. Remnants of the original, VJ timber verandah lining are attached to a notched bearer, indicating the western extent of the 1922 building. The joists supporting the 1922 section are narrower than those of the extensions.

=== 1954 former Visual Education Centre and Library (Block G) ===
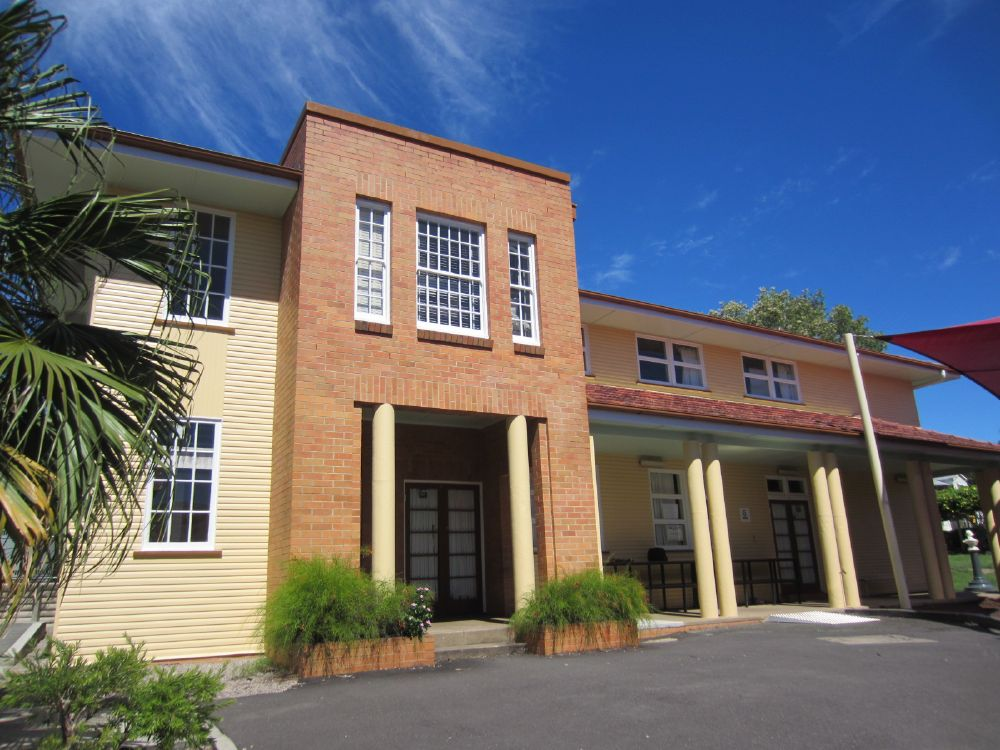
Former library, 2015

The 1954 former Visual Education Centre and Library ('Block G') is a purposed-designed, two-storey, chamferboard-clad structure, with a facebrick projecting porch and verandah on the northern side. It has a terracotta-tiled hip roof with flat-sheet eaves linings and ventilated soffits. The primary entrance to the building is through 5-light French doors within the porch, with secondary entrances from the northern verandah, western staircase and southern patio. Windows are generally timber-framed awnings and there are double-hung windows with timber sashes at the upper level of the porch projection. The porch entryway is flanked by circular concrete columns and low, brick planter boxes. The verandah has a terracotta-tiled hip roof, circular concrete columns, a concrete slab floor and a ceiling lined in flat sheeting. The interior layout of the building is highly intact. The ground floor comprises a foyer with store rooms and a main staircase to the east; and a hall, stage with store rooms, and back-of-house staircase to the west. The upper floor has a singular open space (former library), with a small service room at the western end and a former office space within the northern porch projection. Walls and ceilings of both levels are lined with flat sheeting. The timber handrail of the main staircase is of a geometric design and early 5-light timber French doors between the foyer and hall are retained. Beams expressed within the hall are lined with flat sheeting.

=== 1923 Swimming Pool and 1924 Dressing Shed ===
In the southwest corner of the site is a rectangular, in-ground, concrete swimming pool with a timber-framed, weatherboard-clad dressing shed along the west side. The shed stands on a low brick plinth, has a corrugated metal-clad gable roof with circular roof vents, and decorative ridge-caps at the gable-ends. The primary entrance is in the centre of the eastern elevation, with secondary entrances at the ends. High-level louvred windows run the length of the eastern elevation and a long, high-level window is located in the southern wall. Louvered vents are spaced along the western and eastern elevations. Early tiered, timber seating is attached to the eastern side of the shed.

=== Grounds and trees ===
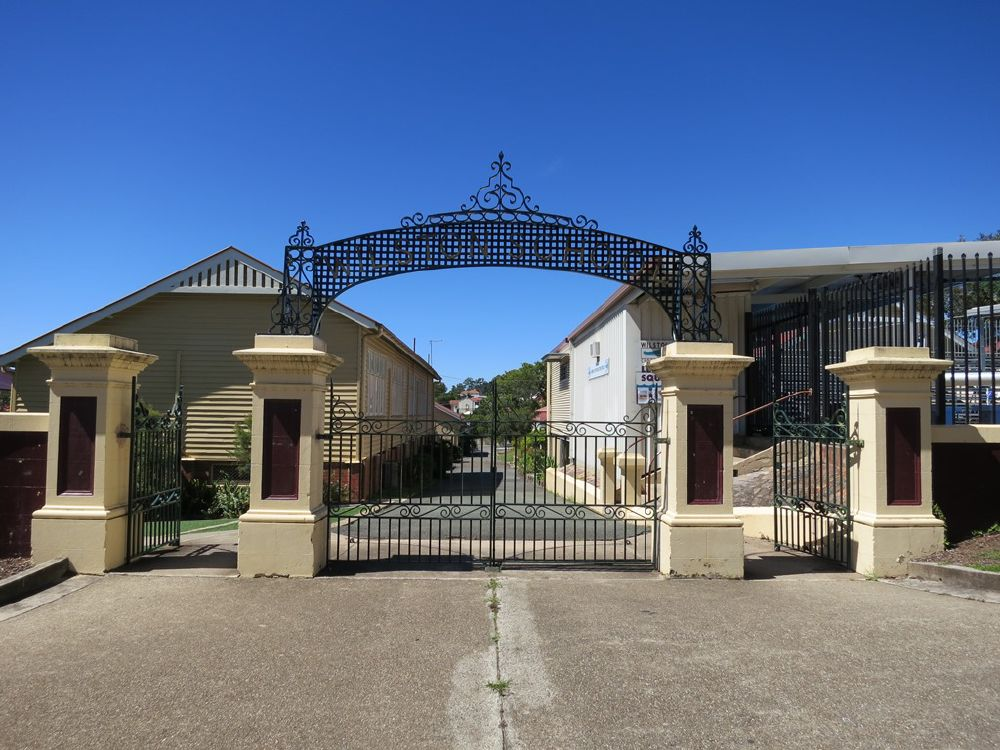
Gates at Thomas Street, 2015

The grounds are well established with many mature trees, including a variety of fig and other shade trees along the Inglis, Carberry and Thomas street boundaries. The terraced nature of the sloping site provides opportunities for views of the surrounding area to be obtained from within the school grounds and the school buildings. Stone pitched walls are in various locations around the site - to the west of Block E; to the north and east of the swimming pool; and to the south of Block C. Gardens at the Primrose Street entrance provide an attractive setting for the school, and are an important connection between Block C and the street. Included in this area are pathways, concrete busts of William Shakespeare and Captain James Cook, established garden beds, a timber pergola structure and lawn areas.

Other elements within the grounds are primarily arranged on two axes: an east–west axis from Inglis Street to Thomas Street (north of Block C); and a north–south axis on the western side of the site (in line with the centre of Block A).

The east–west axis comprises a driveway beginning at the decorative, wrought-iron Thomas Street gates. The gates stand between rendered concrete piers and have an archway featuring "WILSTON STATE SCHOOL" lettering welded to iron latticework. Emphasising the east–west axis is a concrete balustrade (1933) that tops the retaining walls, forming the south and west edges of the former parade ground (north of Block C). The balustrade, which steps with the contours of the terrain, has large square piers and decorative concrete balusters. Rounded stairs, located in a break within the balustrade, are aligned with the centre of Block C. A timber bell tower with a gable roof and decorative timberwork is located at the east end of Block A and houses an early school bell. Sets of low, c. 1930s concrete steps are located along the south edge of the driveway, with one set leading to the pool and others on the north side of Block C.

The north–south axis links Block A with the northern oval. It is defined primarily by a footpath that begins at a set of curved, concrete stairs with low edge walls at an intersection with an Art Deco-style balustrade (1935). This balustrade has concrete piers linked by tubular metal handrails and stands on an ash-brick retaining wall that wraps around the southern and western edges of a lower playground. The axis pathway continues north to a second set of concrete stairs with low edge walls, providing access to the oval.

The generous oval and its established shade trees enhance the school's prominence in its location, provide a picturesque setting for the school and generate a strong sense of place.

The streetscape of the area is beautified by mature perimeter trees; terraced embankments; and the provision of ornamental points of interest, including entrance gates and busts of historical figures.

== Heritage listing ==
Wilston State School was listed on the Queensland Heritage Register on 12 June 2015 having satisfied the following criteria.

The place is important in demonstrating the evolution or pattern of Queensland's history.

Wilston State School (established in 1920) is important in demonstrating the evolution of state education and its associated architecture in Queensland. The place retains excellent and representative examples of standard government designed school buildings that were architectural responses to prevailing government educational philosophies.

The suburban timber school building (1920) represents the culmination of years of experimentation by the Department of Public Works (DPW) with light, classroom size and elevation.

Three sectional school buildings (c. 1922, c. 1922, 1926) demonstrate the evolution of DPW timber school designs to provide equally for educational and climatic needs.

Two purpose-built school buildings (1933, 1954) demonstrate a broadening of the curriculum at some schools to incorporate music and the Arts.

An early swimming pool (1923) and dressing shed (1924) reflect the growing popularity of children learning to swim for health and safety reasons.

The large school site, with mature trees and landscaping features in a large suburban setting, demonstrates the importance of play and aesthetics in the education of children.

The place is important in demonstrating the principal characteristics of a particular class of cultural places.

Wilston State School is important in demonstrating the principal characteristics of Queensland state schools with their later modifications. These include: timber-framed teaching buildings constructed to standard designs by the Queensland Government, and generous, landscaped sites with mature shade trees, assembly/play areas and sporting facilities. The school is a good, intact example of a large suburban school complex, comprising a range of standard and purpose-built timber buildings dating from 1920 to the 1950s, and including non-standard features such as a swimming pool and dressing shed (1923, 1924), entrance gates (1935), bell tower (pre-1939), and busts of historical figures (1923, 1932).

The large Suburban Timber School (Block C, 1920) is a good, intact example of its type, with its symmetrical plan of three wings, highset form with play space, toilet blocks and bench seating beneath, gambrel roofs, continuous northern verandahs, large banks of south-facing windows, projecting teacher's room, single-skin verandah walls, early joinery, and internal features such as glazed classroom partitions.

Three sectional school buildings (Block B, c. 1922; Block E, c. 1922 with c. 1953 extensions; and Block A, 1926) are good examples of their type and Block A is very intact. Characteristics include their highset form with play space beneath, gable roofs, blank end walls, northern verandahs, large banks of south-facing windows, projecting teacher's room (Block A), hat room enclosures, single-skin verandah walls, and early joinery and internal linings.

The purpose-built buildings (Block D, 1933, hall and classroom building; and Block G, 1954, hall and library building) are good examples of individually-designed state school buildings constructed in regions with large urban populations to meet the specific needs of the school. Designed to accommodate multiple functions, both buildings remain largely intact.

The place is important because of its aesthetic significance.

Wilston State School is important for its aesthetic significance as a well-composed complex of buildings unified by their consistent form, scale, materials and orientation. The original symmetrical layout of these buildings remains intact and demonstrates a continuation of site planning ideals initiated by the siting of the first building in a prominent, central position at the top of the sloping grounds. The school's setting is beautified by mature trees and formal landscaping elements such as axial pathways, retaining and balustrade walls, stairs, gardens, and ornamental points of interest, such as entrance gates and busts of historical figures.

The place has a strong or special association with a particular community or cultural group for social, cultural or spiritual reasons.

Schools have always played an important part in Queensland communities. They typically retain significant and enduring connections with former pupils, parents, and teachers; provide a venue for social interaction and volunteer work; and are a source of pride, symbolising local progress and aspirations.

Wilston State School has a strong and ongoing association with the surrounding community. It was established in 1920 through the fundraising efforts of the local community and generations of children have been educated there. The place is important for its contribution to the educational development of its suburban district and is a prominent community focal point and gathering place for social and commemorative events with widespread community support.

== Notable students ==
- Colin Lamont, Member of the Queensland Legislative Assembly

== See also ==
- History of state education in Queensland
- List of schools in Greater Brisbane
