= Alan Walker College of Evangelism =

Coordinates: 33.794°S 151.019°E

The Alan Walker College of Evangelism (AWCE), formerly the Pacific College of Evangelism was a theological college in Sydney, Australia. It was founded by Sir Alan Walker in 1989, and was accredited by the South Pacific Association of Theological Schools.

The college closed in December 2022.
