= National Christian Youth Convention =

The National Christian Youth Convention (NCYC) is a national conference for people aged 16–30 years held by the Uniting Church in Australia every second January. It is held in a different Australian city each time in the long summer school and university holidays. It has attracted over 3,000 delegates from around Australia plus visiting delegations from overseas countries. It is one of the biggest events for youth on the Uniting Church's calendar.

== History ==
NCYC began in 1955 with an evangelical campaign run by Rev. Dr. Sir Alan Walker as an activity of the Central Methodist Mission in Sydney held at the Royal Showgrounds, from 16 to 23 January 1955. The theme was "God Works". Keynote speakers included Dr A. Harold Wood, Alan Walker, and Dr Roy L. Smith from the United States who also led the Bible studies. It was designed to reach the entire Christian community, not just that of the Methodist Church of Australasia (see Methodism).

The 50th anniversary NCYC was held in January 2005 at the Gawler campus of Trinity College to the north of Adelaide in South Australia.

Here is a full list of every NCYC held since 1955:

- 1955. New South Wales, Sydney. Theme: God Works
- 1957. South Australia, Adelaide.
- 1960. Queensland, Brisbane.
- 1963. Victoria, Melbourne.
- 1966. Western Australia, Perth.
- 1969. New South Wales, Sydney.
- 1973. Queensland, Gold Coast.
- 1975. South Australia, Adelaide. Theme: Three Worlds – One World – For God
- 1977. ACT, Canberra. Theme: Turning Point
- 1979. Western Australia, Perth. Theme: Directions
- 1981. New South Wales, Sydney. Theme: Focus
- 1983. Queensland, Brisbane. Theme: Witness
- 1985. South Australia, Adelaide. Theme: Dreams and Visions
- 1987. Victoria, Ballarat. Theme: Being There
- 1989. Western Australia, Perth. Theme: Cross the Desert
- 1991. Queensland, Toowoomba. Theme: Breaking New Ground
- 1993. ACT, Canberra. Theme: Love In A Dangerous Time
- 1995. SA, Adelaide. Theme: Living On The Edge
- 1997. Tasmania. Theme: Living the Legend
- 1999. Victoria, Geelong. Theme: It All Depends
- 2001. Queensland. Theme: Now is the Time
- 2003. NSW, Newcastle. Theme: Shaking The Foundations
- 2005. SA, Gawler. Theme: Live This Life
- 2007. WA, Scotch College Perth Perth, Western Australia. Theme: Agents of Change also had an inaugural Adult Convention.
- 2009. Victoria, Methodist Ladies' College, Melbourne. Theme: Converge
- 2011. Queensland, Gold Coast. Theme: Turn It Up
- 2014. NSW, Sydney. Theme: Yurora
- 2017. NSW, Stanwell Tops. Theme: Yurora – Uniting Culture.

== Organisation ==
The event is usually organised and hosted by a Synod by agreement with the Uniting Church's National Assembly. NCYC 2014 was an exception as it was hosted by Parramatta-Nepean Presbytery within the Synod of NSW & ACT. Leadership is by a local organising committee utilising existing networks within the responsible Synod. It is typically coordinated by a young minister of religion. Older adults are mobilised to support and assist.

Sometimes a university campus and its accommodation has been the base for the event. A range of accommodation options are offered, ranging from camping in tents to live-in accommodation and billeting.

== See also ==
- Mission (Christian)
