= Wilston =

Suburb of Brisbane, Australia

- Suburb
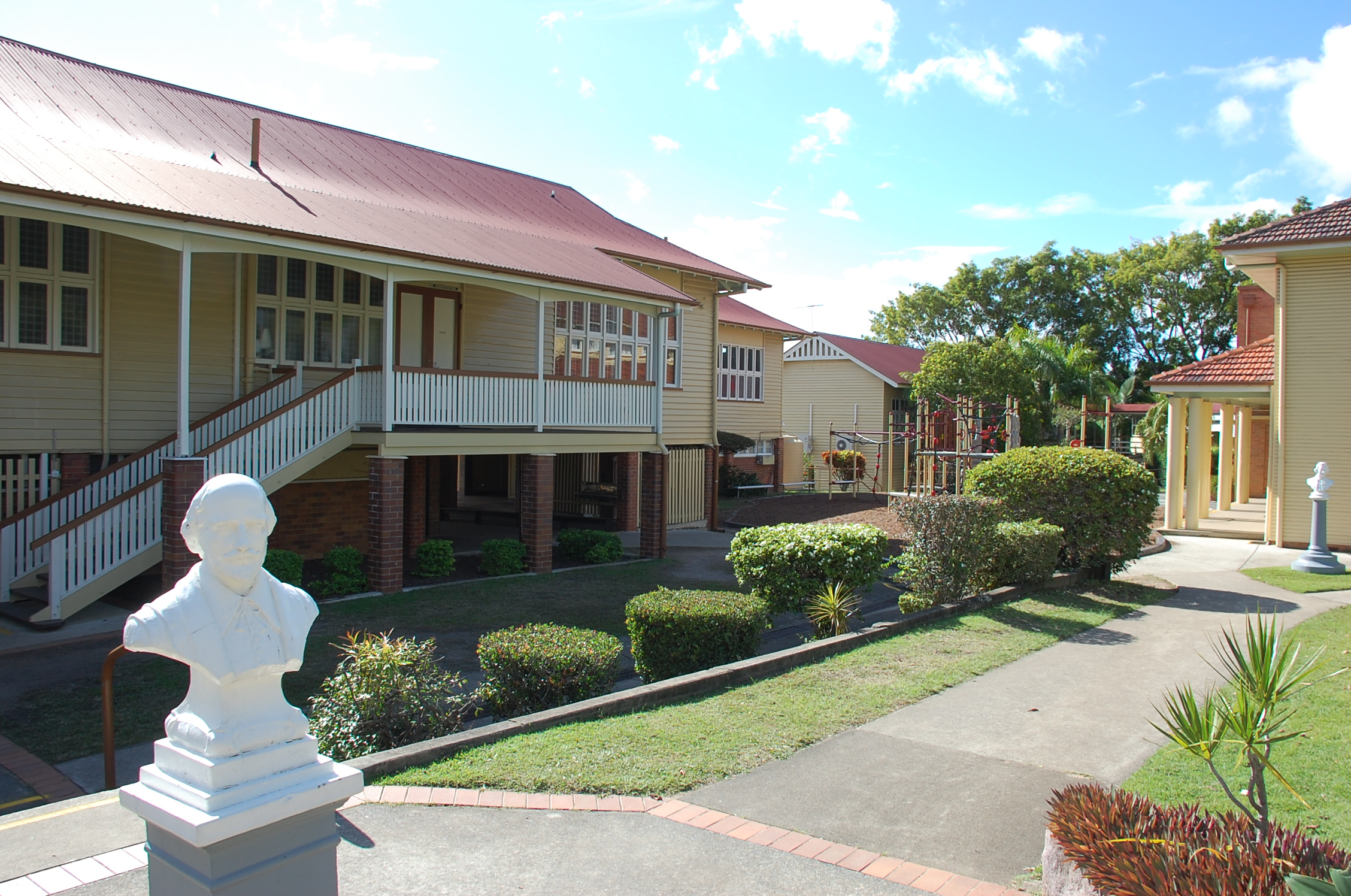
- Wilston State School

- Interactive map of Wilston
- Coordinates: 27.4361°S 153.0166°E
- Country: Australia
- State: Queensland
- City: Brisbane
- LGA: City of Brisbane (Enoggera Ward)
- Location: 5.1 km (3.2 mi) N of Brisbane CBD
- Established: 1880s

Government
  - State electorates: Stafford; Clayfield
  - Federal division: Brisbane

Area
  - Total: 1.4 km^{2} (0.54 sq mi)

Population
  - Total: 4,110 (2021 census)
  - Density: 2,940/km^{2} (7,600/sq mi)
- Time zone: UTC+10:00 (AEST)
- Postcode: 4051
Suburbs around Wilston
Alderley	Grange	Lutwyche
Newmarket	Wilston	Windsor
Kelvin Grove	Herston	Bowen Hills

Wilston is a northern suburb in the City of Brisbane, Queensland, Australia. In the 2021 census, Wilston had a population of 4,110 people.

== Geography ==
Wilston is located 5.1 kilometres (3.2 mi) by road north of the Brisbane CBD.

== History ==
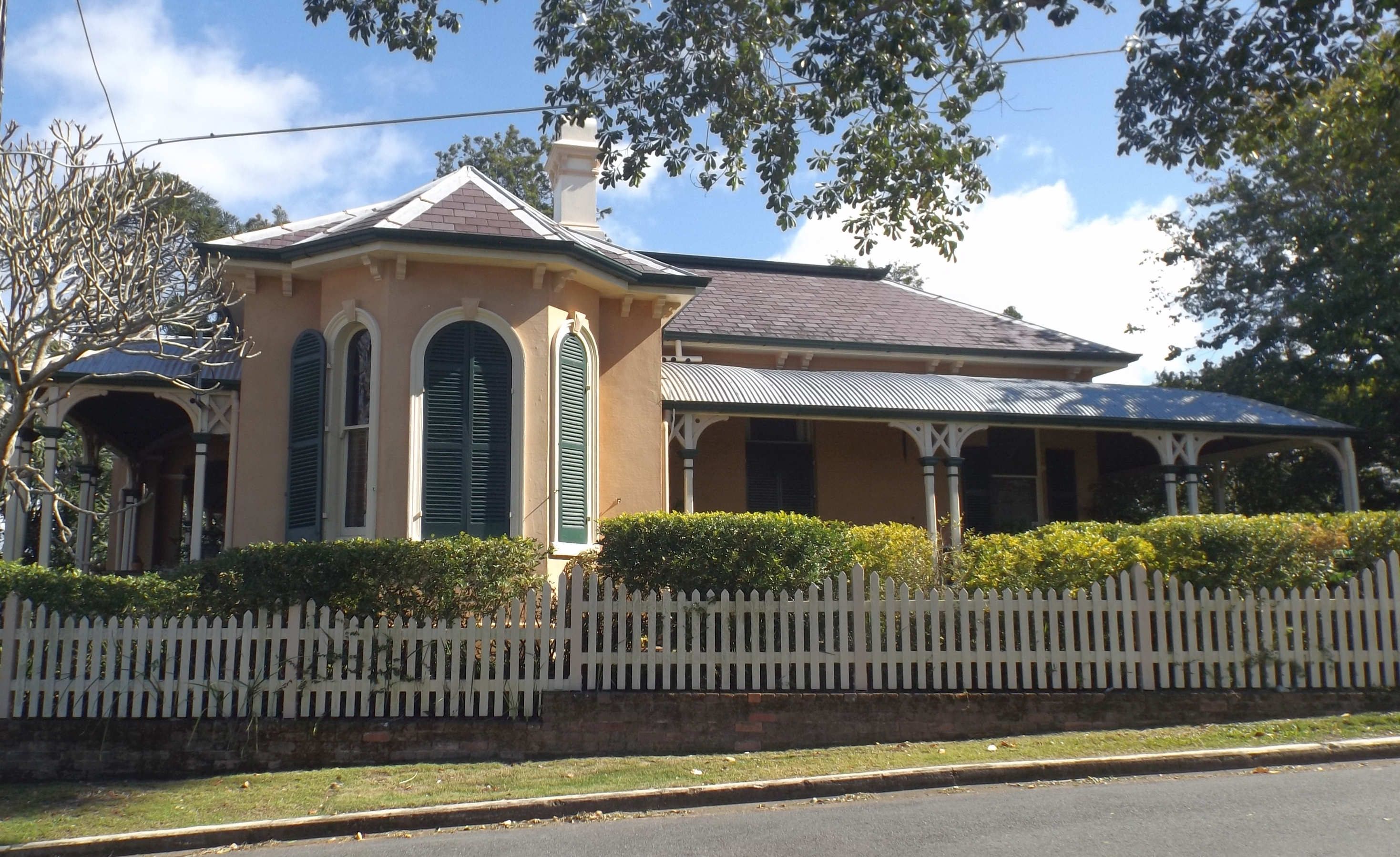
Wilston House, 2015

The area became known as Wilston after the home of the same name built there by the Honourable William Wilson MLC, who settled in the district in 1868. The home, which was constructed circa 1876, was named Wilston House after Wilson's birthplace home at Derrykeeghan Mills, Enniskillen, County Fermanagh, Ireland.

In 1884, the land passed to businessman John Stevenson MLA, who subdivided the property.

On Sunday 10 August 1913, a stump-capping ceremony was held for the new Wilston Methodist Church. The official opening was held on Sunday 26 October 1913.

On 1 October 1916, Roman Catholic Archbishop James Duhig opened St Columba's Primary School. It was operated by Good Samarian Sisters.

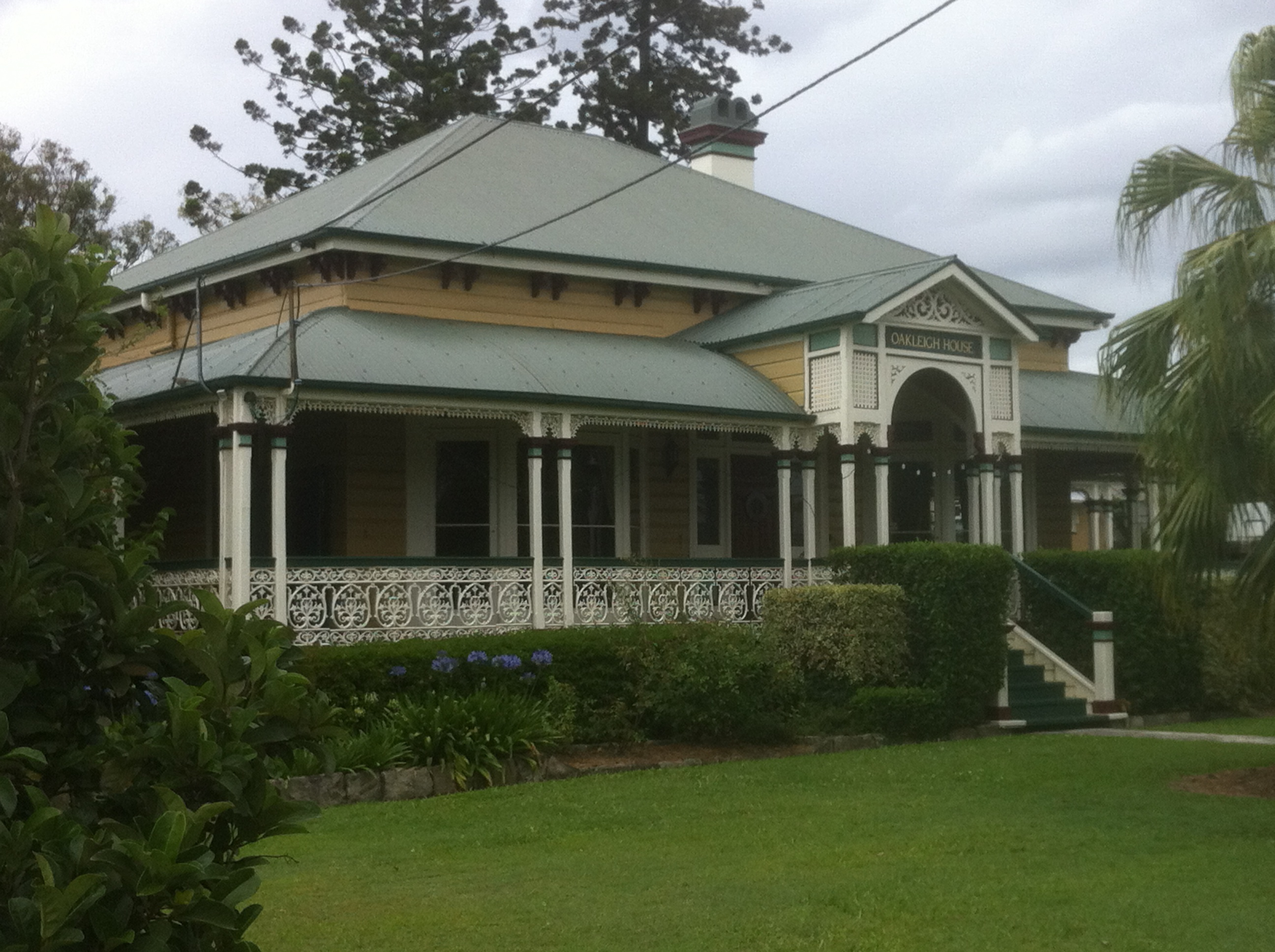
Oakleigh House, 2011

== Demographics ==
In the 2011 census, Wilston had a population of 3,872 people, 50.1% female and 49.9% male. The median age of the Wilston population was 35 years, 2 years below the Australian median. 76% of people living in Wilston were born in Australia, compared to the national average of 69.8%; the next most common countries of birth were England 4.5%, New Zealand 3.2%, Italy 1.3%, India 1.1%, South Africa 0.7%. 87.4% of people spoke only English at home; the next most common languages were 1.9% Italian, 0.6% German, 0.6% Cantonese, 0.6% Mandarin, 0.5% Punjabi.

In the 2016 census, Wilston had a population of 3,937 people.

In the 2021 census, Wilston had a population of 4,110 people.

== Heritage listings ==
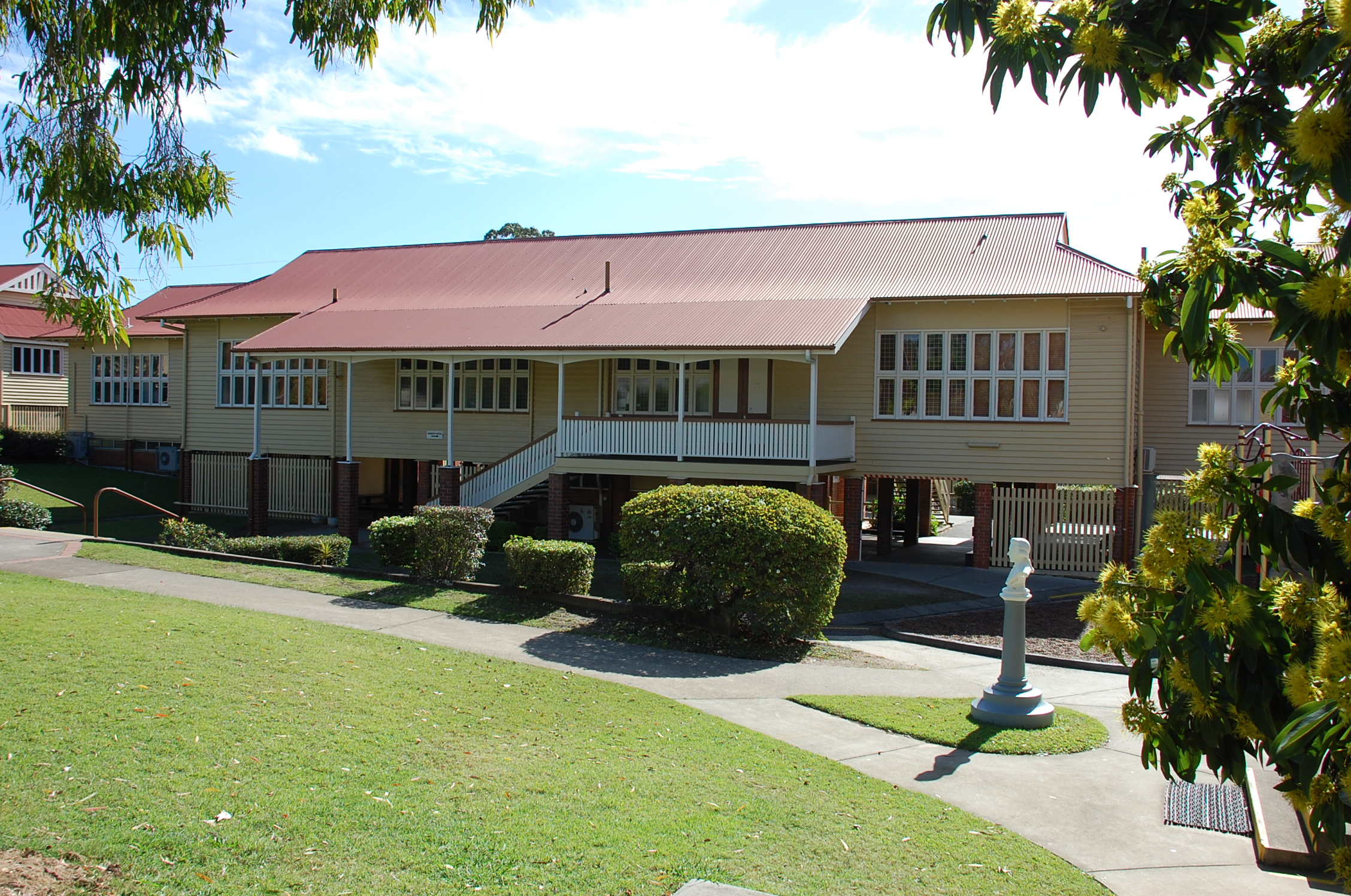
Wilston State School is one of two schools in the area

Heritage-listed sites in Wilston include:

- Uanda (house), 27 Clifton Street
- Wilston Methodist Memorial Church, 181 Kedron Brook Road (27.4285°S 153.0189°E)
- Wilston State School, Primrose Street (now in Grange)

== Education ==
St Columba's Primary School is a Catholic primary (Prep–6) school for boys and girls at Kedron Brook Road (27.4289°S 153.0185°E). In 2018, the school had an enrolment of 593 students with 43 teachers (34 full-time equivalent) and 35 non-teaching staff (20 full-time equivalent).

There are no government schools in Wilston. The nearest government primary school is Wilston State School, which, despite its name, is within the neighbouring suburb of Grange to the north. The nearest government secondary school is Kelvin Grove State College in neighbouring Kelvin Grove to the south-west and Kedron State High School in Kedron to the north-east.

== Sporting clubs ==
Sporting clubs in the area include the 100+ year old Grange Thistle Football Club (GTFC, which also incorporates the Grange Bowls Club), Wilston Norths Junior Cricket Club, Wilston Grange Australian Football Club, Fortitude Valley Rugby League Football Club and St Andrews Ladies Hockey Club.

Other clubs include DAT Racing (triathlon), Wilston Crocs (swimming club), and Lococo Tennis.

The nearby Grange Club (Grange Bowls and Community Club Inc.) has represented the suburb in lawn bowls for 70 years.

== Retail business ==
Wilston Village in Kedron Brook Road is the main retail area. Local stores in the area are supplemented by larger centres at HomeZone at Windsor,

== Transport ==
Wilston railway station provides access to regular Queensland Rail Citytrain network services to Ferny Grove, Brisbane and Beenleigh.

== Parks ==
There are a number of parks in the suburb, including:

- Eildon Hill Reserve (27.4308°S 153.0233°E)
- Finsbury Park (27.4401°S 153.0147°E)
- Hinkler Park (27.4321°S 153.0239°E)
- Langley Avenue Park (27.4406°S 153.0185°E)
- Ruby Robinson Reserve (27.4417°S 153.0216°E)
- Wilston Place Park (27.4352°S 153.0198°E)
- Wilston Recreation Reserve (27.4412°S 153.0127°E)

== Notable residents ==
James Tolson, a short-term resident of Wilston House, conducted important experiments in chilling mutton for export from Australia to Great Britain.

Major General William Cahill, a commissioner of police in Queensland, also lived at Wilston House for a period. During his residence he further developed the grounds, which became known as a sanctuary for birds and native fauna.

Peter Beattie, the former Premier of Queensland, previously resided in this suburb. https://www.domain.com.au/news/house-of-former-premier-peter-beattie-for-sale-20151029-gkm6eb/
