= Fulton Adventist University College =

Seventh-day Adventist tertiary institution

Coordinates: 17.827022°S 178.549697°E

Fulton College
- Type: Private
- Established: 1905
- Affiliations: Adventist Tertiary Network (South Pacific), Seventh-day Adventist Church
- Academic affiliations: Fiji Higher Education Commission, Accrediting Association of Seventh-day Adventist Schools, Colleges and Universities, South Pacific Association of Theological Schools
- Principal: Dr Ronald Stone
- Academic staff: 21
- Location: Sabeto Rd, Nadi, Fiji
- Website: fulton.ac.fj

Fulton Adventist University College is a co-educational boarding tertiary institution situated on the western side of Viti Levu on the main island of Fiji. It is operated by the Seventh-day Adventist church and serves the island countries of Fiji, American Samoa, Cook Islands, Kiribati, French Polynesia, Nauru, New Caledonia, Niue, Samoa, Solomon Islands, Tonga, Tuvalu, and Vanuatu. Its services are also offered to Pacific Islanders and other interested individuals living in Australia, New Zealand, and overseas.

Fulton Adventist University College is a part of the Seventh-day Adventist education system, the world's second-largest Christian school system.

Fulton will be soon changing its status to become a University, so its new name will be Fulton Adventist University. Date of this transition will be on 25th November, 2025.

== Campus ==
The college is approximately 10 km from Nadi International Airport on Sabeto Road. The College campus is set on a 123-acre (0.50 km^{2}) property in the Sabeto Valley under the Sleeping Giant. This relocated campus was opened on 12 February 2014.

== Academic divisions ==
Fulton is divided into the following divisions offering the following degrees (diplomas also available in all degree areas)

- Business

Bachelor of Business [Accounting & Management], Bachelor of Business [Information Systems], Bachelor of Business [Marketing]

- Education

Bachelor of Education Honours [Primary], Bachelor of Education [Primary], Bachelor of Education [Early Childhood], Postgraduate Diploma in Education, Graduate Diploma in Adventist Education

- Theology

Bachelor of Theology Honours, Bachelor of Theology, Postgraduate Diploma in Theology, Graduate Diploma in Adventist Studies, Graduate Diploma in Theology

- Foundation Studies

Certificate in Foundation Studies [Business], [Education], [Theology]

== See also ==
- List of Seventh-day Adventist colleges and universities
- Seventh-day Adventist education
