= Harold Wood (minister) =

Australian Christian minister and writer

Alfred Harold Wood OBE (4 May 1896 – 27 August 1989) was a 20th-century Australian Christian minister, educator, writer, hymnologist and advocate of church union.

== Early life ==
A. Harold Wood was born in Geelong, Victoria, the son of Alfred Wood (1867–1941) and Janet (nee Wemyss; 1866–1959), who were Salvation Army officers.

He was educated in Sydney and initially qualified as a barrister in Victoria.

== Career in Tonga ==
Converting to Methodism, Wood was ordained a Methodist minister in 1924 and his new bride, medical doctor Olive (nee O'Reilly) left immediately to a missionary appointment in the Kingdom of Tonga, where he was known as Haloti 'Uti (Harold Wood) and she 'Olife (Olive). In their 13 years in the Pacific nation, they developed a special fondness and love for the people and the country.

Early on, Wood supported Queen Salote with legal advice in her work to reconcile two Methodist factions and became well acquainted with and respected by the Royal Family and others.

Appointed principal of Free Wesleyan boys' boarding school Tupou College, the school moved from Nuku'alofa west to Nafualu under his leadership, and grew from 30 students to almost 400, becoming the biggest school in the country. At Wood's urging, scholarships were offered by the Tongan government to enable students to further their education in Australia, or go to Fiji for medical training.

Wood learned the Tongan language fluently and wrote (English-language) books on Tongan history and geography which were still used as secondary school textbooks at the time of his death.

Wood was also responsible for the training in Tonga of candidates for church ministry.

== Career in Melbourne ==
Returning to Australia in 1937, Wood became principal of Methodist Ladies' College (MLC) in Kew, Victoria, from 1939 until his retirement in 1966.

From 1966 to 1977 he served as a parish minister at Deepdene Methodist (now Uniting) Church in Nungerner Street, Deepdene, Melbourne, which he caused to be renamed St Paul's.

Wood attained a doctorate of Divinity in 1947, with a dissertation on church union (published as Unity Without Uniformity). He was President of the Methodist Church of Victoria and Tasmania in 1952–53 and President-General of the Methodist Church of Australasia 1957–60 (all while principal of MLC). An ardent advocate of church union, he lived to see the formation of the Uniting Church in Australia in 1977.

A renowned orator, Dr Wood preached at least twice most Sundays and his sermons were frequently reported in the press. He was a regular at Speakers' Corner on the Yarra River, and a keynote speaker at the first National Christian Youth Convention, held in 1955.

A vocal opponent of nuclear weapons, the Vietnam War and the White Australia policy, he was under ASIO surveillance from 1954 to 1972. Progressive in his day, he was never, however, a Communist.

An accomplished pianist, Wood chaired the ecumenical committee to produce the ecumenical Australian Hymn Book (elsewhere titled With One Voice) published in 1977 (ISBN 1-86371-150-3).

== Personal life ==
Wood married North Shore medical doctor Olive K. O'Reilly in 1924. They had six children, all born in Tonga. Among them were Elizabeth Wood-Ellem, Pacific historian and author of the definitive biography of Queen Salote of Tonga, actor Monica Maughan and churchman and hymnologist the Rev. H. D'Arcy Wood, who was president of the National Assembly of the Uniting Church from 1991 to 1994.

After Olive's death in 1976, he married Dora Walker (1920–2014).

Wood died in Melbourne in 1989, aged 93.

== Honours ==
The mainly Tongan congregation in Auburn, New South Wales named their church after him: Harold Wood Auburn Uniting Church.

He was awarded an OBE.

== Biography ==
A comprehensive 272-page biography by Ian Breward, Dr Harold Wood: A Notable Methodist, was published by Uniting Academic Press in Melbourne in 2013.

== Publications ==
- History and Geography of Tonga, (1943), Auckland. By Authority.
- Church Unity Without Uniformity: A Study of Seventeenth-Century English Church Movements and of Richard Baxter's Proposals for a Comprehensive Church (1963), London. The Epworth Press.
- Overseas Missions of the Australian Methodist Church. Volume One: Tonga and Samoa (1975), Melbourne. Aldersgate Press
- Overseas Missions of the Australian Methodist Church. Volume Two: Fiji (1978), Melbourne. Aldersgate Press
- Overseas Missions of the Australian Methodist Church. Volume Three: Fiji-Indian and Rotuma (1978), Melbourne. Aldersgate Press
- Overseas Missions of the Australian Methodist Church. Volume Four: North India (Lucknow-Banaras District), (1980), Melbourne. Aldersgate Press
- with Margaret Reeson. Overseas Missions of the Australian Methodist Church Volume Five.: Papua New Guinea Highlands: A Bridge is Built: A Story of the United Church in the Highlands of Papua New Guinea (1987), Sydney. Uniting Church Commission for Mission
