= Alan Walker (theologian) =

Australian theologian

Sir Alan Edgar Walker
- Born: 4 June 1911; Sydney, New South Wales, Australia
- Died: 29 January 2003 (aged 91); Sydney, New South Wales, Australia
- Other names: "Mister Methodist"; "The Methodist Pope"; "That Nice Alan Warble"; "Conscience of The Nation"
- Education: Doctor of Divinity
- Occupations: Christian minister, theologian and evangelist, social commentator, activist
- Spouse: Winifred Walker
- Children: 4
- Parents: Alfred Edgar Walker; Violet Louisa Walker (née Lavis)
- Awards: Knight Bachelor, OBE, Centenary Medal

Sir Alan Edgar Walker OBE (4 June 1911 – 29 January 2003) was an Australian theologian, evangelist, social commentator, broadcaster and activist, and the Superintendent of Wesley Mission (formerly the Central Methodist Mission).

== Career ==
Alan Walker was involved in the formation of the World Council of Churches in 1948. He was superintendent of the Methodist (later Uniting Church in Australia) Wesley Mission, Pitt Street, Sydney, 1958–1978 and one of the founders of the National Christian Youth Convention (NCYC) in 1955 and Lifeline in 1963. He was first world director of evangelism for the World Methodist Council, 1978 to 1988. He was involved in founding the World Methodist Evangelism Institute (located at the United Methodist-related Candler School of Theology at Emory University) in Atlanta, 1982. He was principal of the Pacific College of Evangelism, now the Alan Walker College of Evangelism, in Sydney, 1989–1995. Following the closure of the Alan Walker College the Uniting Theological College in Sydney has been home to the Alan Walker Lectureship in Mission and Evangelism.

== Lifeline ==
Walker launched Lifeline in Sydney, Australia in 1963 after a call from a distressed man who three days later killed himself. Walker launched a crisis line which initially operated out of the Methodist Central Mission in Sydney.

Lifeline Sydney was two years in planning and preparation, with 150 people attending a nine-month training course to work at the centre. A century old, dilapidated building owned by the Mission, on the fringes of downtown Sydney was renovated for the purposes of this new support centre. A staff of full-time employees was appointed to direct the work of these new telephone crisis support workers. The Director General of Post and Telephone Services authorised that this crisis support service should be listed on the Emergency Page of the Telephone Directory and the phones were installed.

March 1963 saw the opening of the first official Lifeline Centre. The initiative was well received with over 100 calls for help being answered on the first day. In its 50th year, Lifeline had over 11,000 volunteers and spoke to more than 500,000 people in crisis annually.(Lifeline Australia Annual Report 2011/12)

== Honours and awards ==
- 1955: Officer of the Order of the British Empire (OBE)
- 1981: Knight Bachelor
- 1986: World Methodist Peace Award
- 1997: Named as one of 100 people as an Australian Living Treasure
- 2001: Centenary Medal

== Personal life ==
Walker was born in Sydney, New South Wales on 4 June 1911 to the Reverend Alfred Edgar Walker (1877–1966) and Violet Louisa Walker (née Lavis) (1881–1971). He was married to Winifred Walker (later Lady Walker) (1916–2006) and they had four children, Lynette Sue, Rev Bruce Walker, David Walker and Rev Christopher Walker. He died in 2003, at an aged care centre on Sydney's North Shore, aged 91.

== Biographies ==
- Don Wright, Alan Walker: Conscience of the Nation, Sydney: Open Book Publishers, 1997. ISBN 0-85910-836-8.
- Harold Henderson, Reach for the World: The Alan Walker Story, Nashville, Tennessee: Discipleship Resources, 1981.
