= Grange, Queensland =

Grange
- Suburb
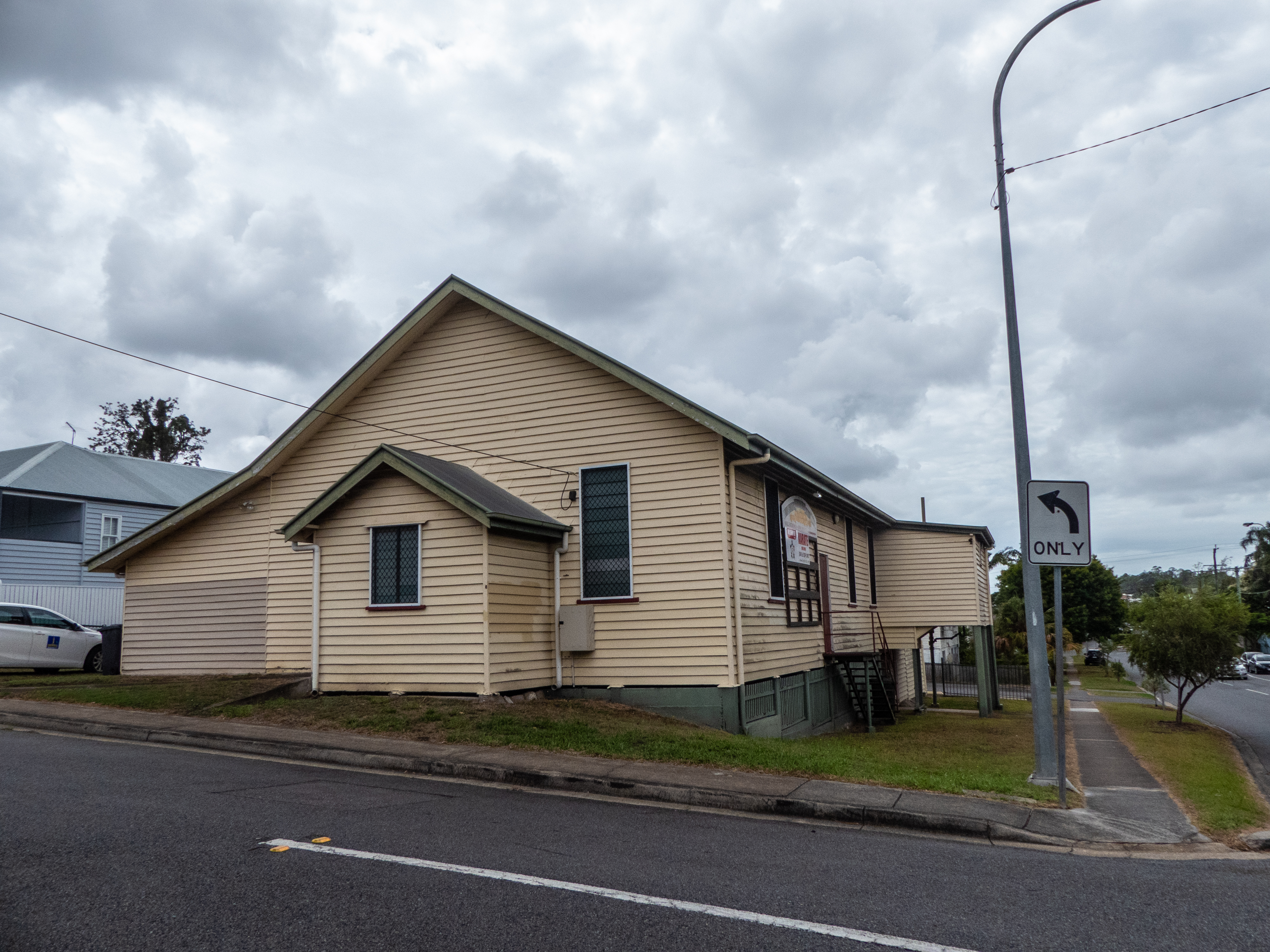
- Grange Hall, a community centre

- Interactive map of Grange
- Coordinates: 27.4233°S 153.0144°E
- Country: Australia
- State: Queensland
- City: Brisbane
- LGA: City of Brisbane (Enoggera Ward; Marchant Ward)
- Location: 6.3 km (3.9 mi) N of Brisbane CBD

Government
  - State electorates: Stafford; Clayfield
  - Federal division: Brisbane

Area
  - Total: 1.8 km^{2} (0.69 sq mi)

Population
  - Total: 4,615 (2021 census)
  - Density: 2,560/km^{2} (6,640/sq mi)
- Time zone: UTC+10:00 (AEST)
- Postcode: 4051
Suburbs around Grange
| Stafford | Stafford | Gordon Park |
| Alderley | Grange | Lutwyche |
| Newmarket | Wilston | Windsor |

Grange is a northern suburb in the City of Brisbane, Queensland, Australia. In the 2021 census, Grange had a population of 4,615 people.

== Geography ==
Grange is located 5 kilometres (3 mi) north of the Brisbane central business district, on the southern side of Kedron Brook. It is sometimes referred to as The Grange.

There is a hill in the west of the suburb called The Pinnacle (27.4232°S 153.0108°E) rising to 57 metres (187 ft) above sea level.

== History ==
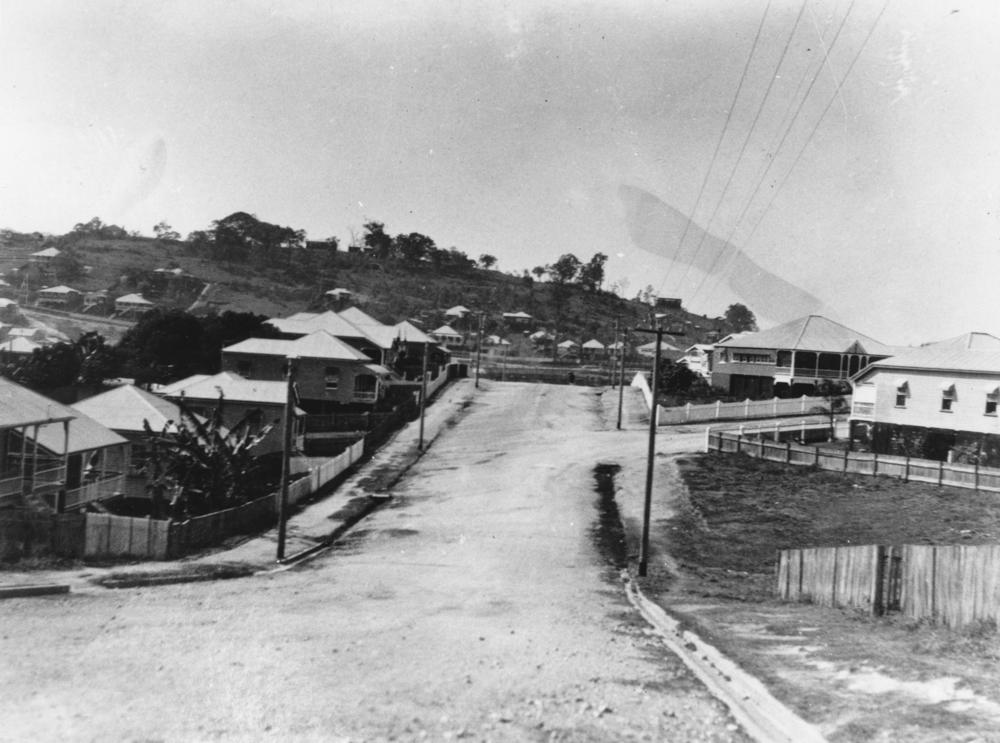
New homes in the Brisbane suburb of The Grange, 1929

Prior to the arrival of British settlers, the Grange area consisted of areas of open grassland and thinly wooded plains.

In the 1860s, fellmonger T. K. Peate established The Grange Tannery and Fellmongery Company on Kedron Brook.

Suburban development of the area commenced in 1903 with the subdivision of T. K. Peate's property into "the Grange Estate". The name of the suburb is derived from that of Peate's property: "Grange" is believed to be an Old English word meaning granary.

In about March 1918, a block of land was purchased for £100 to build a Baptist church in Newmarket/Grange. The church opened on Saturday 21 June 1919. The church was at 197 Wilston Road (corner of Carberry Street) in Grange and is known as Grange Baptist Church.

Wilston State School opened on 16 August 1920 on the site of the former Coronation Park.

After seven years of agitation, Brisbane's tram service was extended to Grange in July 1928. The opening ceremony was attended by the Lord Mayor of Brisbane, William Jolly, and two Members of the Queensland Legislative Assembly, James Stevingstone Kerr and Charles Taylor. The mayor had threatened not to attend any ceremony for the opening of the tram service because two rival groups were organising separate celebrations; he would only attend if there was a single ceremony.

Grange Heights Methodist Church opened on Saturday 23 February 1946 at 26 Progress Road (27.4244°S 153.0071°E), now in Alderley. It became Grange Heights Uniting Church. It closed between 1975 and 1990. The building still exists and is used as a childcare centre.

St Paul the Apostle's Anglican Church at Grange Heights (the elevated western part of the suburb) was dedicated on 4 April 1964 by Archbishop Philip Strong. It was at 17 Blandford Street (27.4212°S 153.0090°E). It closed on 29 November 1989. It is now called Blandford Place and used as commercial premises.

The Newmarket Congregation of Jehovah's Witnesses opened their Kingdom Hall at 108 Blandford Street in 1989.

The Grange Library opened in 1979 and had a major refurbishment in 2014.

== Demographics ==
In the 2011 census, Grange recorded a population of 4,163 people, 51.7% female and 48.3% male. The median age of the Grange population was 36 years of age, 1 year below the Australian median. 78.9% of people living in Grange were born in Australia, compared to the national average of 69.8%; the next most common countries of birth were England 4.3%, New Zealand 3.4%, Italy 0.9%, Scotland 0.7%, United States of America 0.7%. 90.4% of people spoke only English at home; the next most common languages were 1.3% Italian, 0.6% Mandarin, 0.5% German, 0.5% French, 0.3% Hindi.

In the 2016 census, Grange had a population of 4,318 people.

In the 2021 census, Grange had a population of 4,615 people.

== Heritage listings ==
Heritage-listed sites in Grange include:

- Primrose Street: Wilston State School

== Education ==
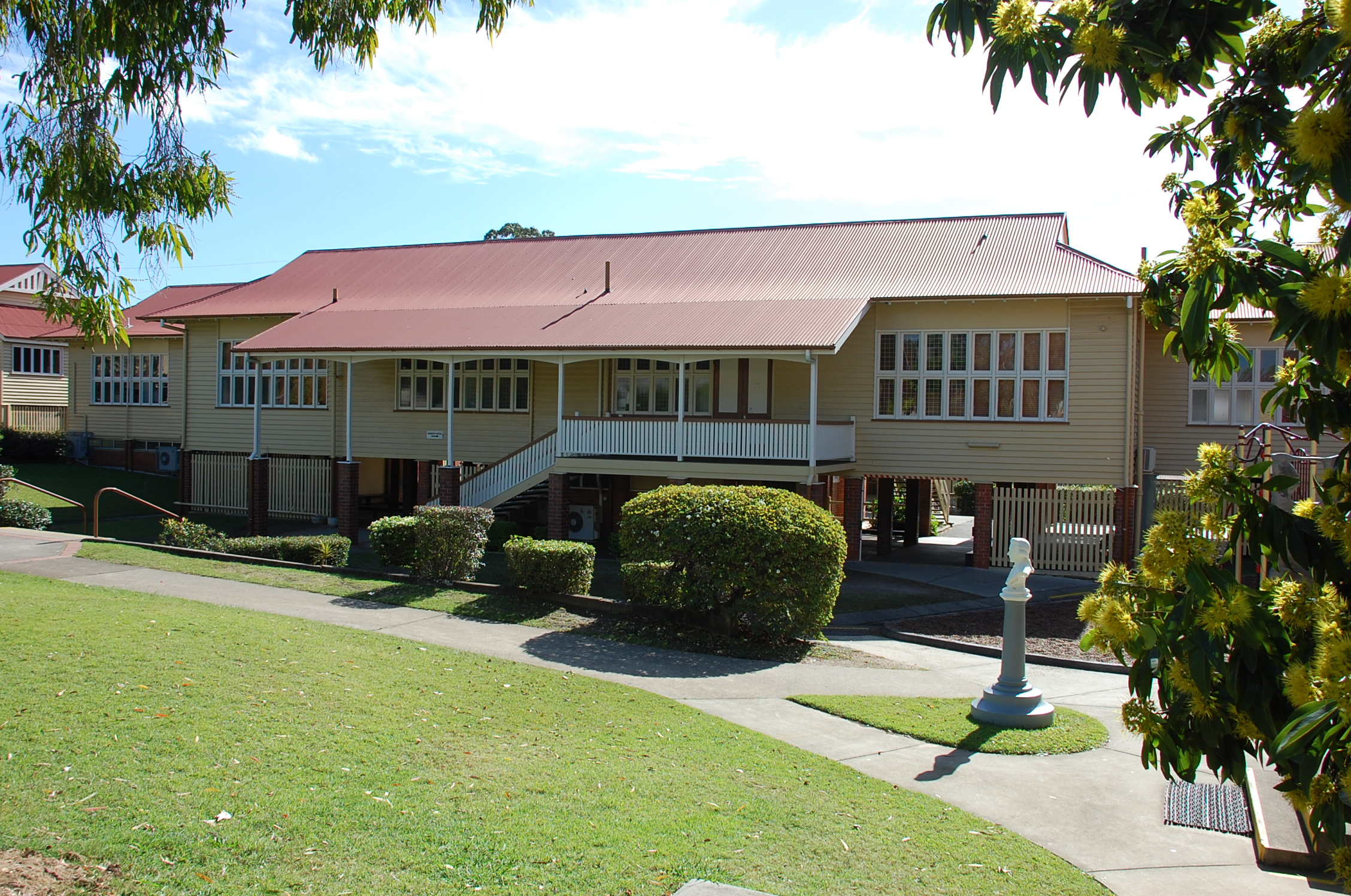
Wilston State School administration block

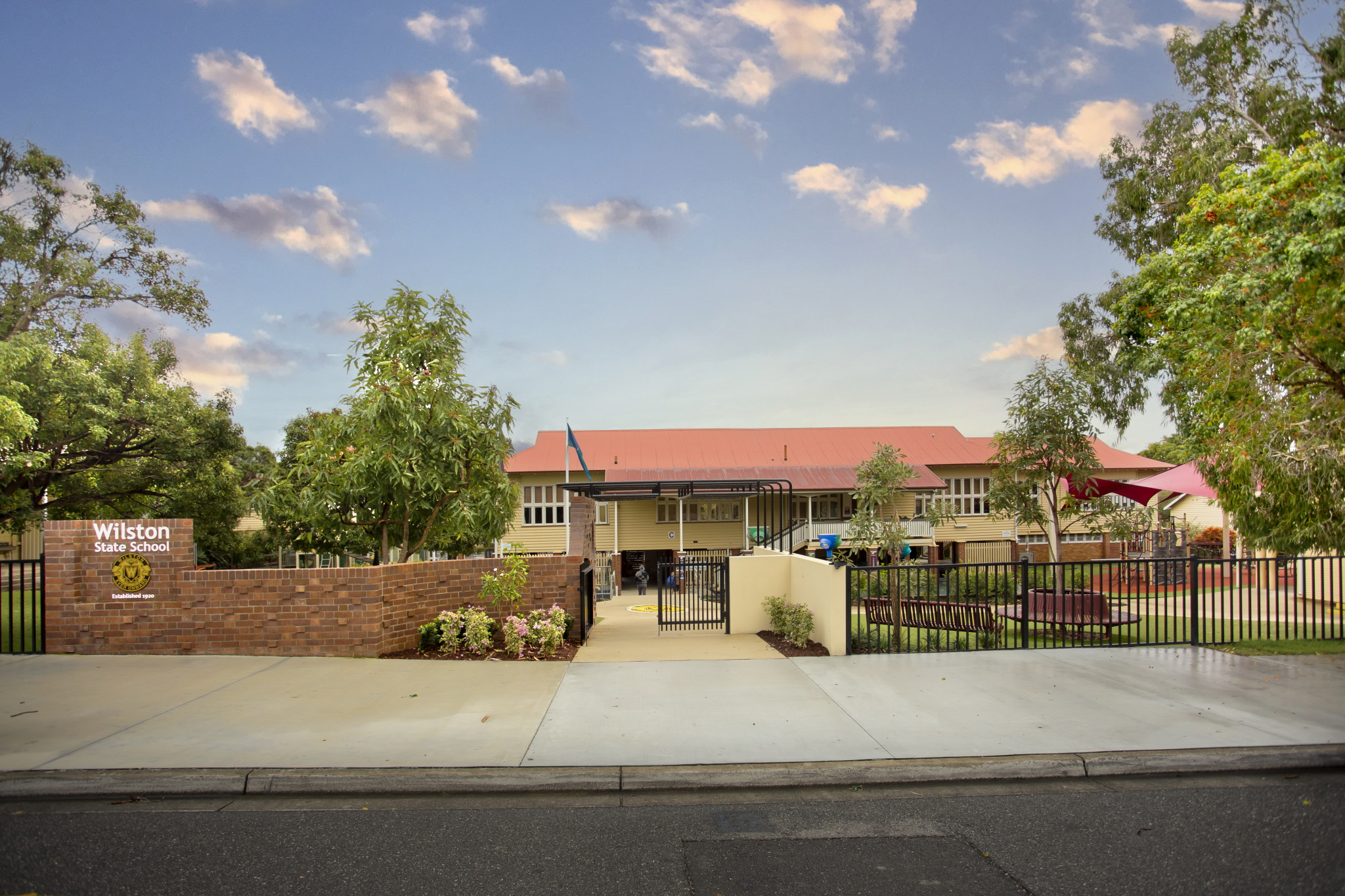
Front entrance, Wilston State School, 2022

Despite the name, Wilston State School is a government primary (Prep-6) school for boys and girls at Primrose Street in Grange (27.4289°S 153.0150°E). It includes a special education program. In 2018, the school had an enrolment of 887 students with 60 teachers (52 full-time equivalent) and 28 non-teaching staff (19 full-time equivalent).

There is no secondary school in Grange. The nearest government secondary schools are Everton Park State High School in Everton Park to the north-west, Kedron State High School in Kedron to the north-east, and Kelvin Grove State College in Kelvin Grove to the south.

== Amenities ==
The Brisbane City Council operates the Grange Library at 79 Evelyn Street (27.4252°S 153.0176°E).

Grange Post Office is at 64 Thomas Street (27.4263°S 153.0146°E).

The Kingdom Hall of Jehovah's Witnesses is at 108 Blandford Street (27.4202°S 153.0140°E).

=== Parks ===
There are a number of parks in the area, including:

- Alderley Grove Park (27.4200°S 153.0080°E)
- Emerson Park (27.4184°S 153.0185°E)
- Gilbert Road Park (27.4215°S 153.0224°E)
- Grange Forest Park (27.4176°S 153.0107°E)
- Halford Park (27.4196°S 153.0095°E)
- Lanham Park (27.4230°S 153.0189°E)

== Sporting clubs ==
Fortitude Valley Rugby League Football Club, Valleys Diehards was founded in 1908 and is Brisbane's oldest Rugby League club. Located in Bega Street at Emerson Park since 1971, teams range from Under 6 up to seniors including a BRL A-Grade Men's and a BHP Premiership Women's team which is a Queensland State competition.

Grange Thistle Football Club was founded in 1920. It was formerly known as the Thistle Football Club until 1961 and has played at Lanham Park, Grange (27.4220°S 153.0185°E) since 1930, with a break from 1932 to 1942, during which the club suspended its activities.

The Wilston Grange Australian Football Club has represented the suburb at Australian rules football since 1945. For 70 years the Grange Bowls Club (Grange Bowls and Community Club Inc.) has represented the suburb in lawn bowls. It is also in Lanham Park (27.4234°S 153.0187°E).

== See also ==
- List of Brisbane suburbs
- Maureen Hayes
