= Fiji College of Theology & Evangelism =

College Of Theology & Evangelism Fiji
- Motto: "Knowing, Living & Teaching The Bible"
- Type: Private
- Established: 1974, teaching existed since 1974; 52 years ago
- Founders: Dr. Narayan Nair
- Affiliations: Ambassadors For Christ; Fiji Bible College Bookshop; FCTE Learning; Christian Helps; Bible Churches Fiji; Fiji Bible College
- Principal: Premendran Choy
- Students: 1000
- Location: Lautoka, Fiji Islands; 17.6154°S 177.4846°E
- Website: https://www.fijibiblecollege.org/ www.fijibiblecollege.org]

The College of Theology and Evangelism Fiji (informally Fiji College, FCTE or simply Fiji Bible College) is the oldest accredited theological college in Fiji. It was established in Fiji in 1974. The college decided to offer courses externally, making it the second largest (behind PTC) in Fiji.

The college has a number of small special-purpose satellite campuses around the Lautoka and Suva regions, however the main campus is centred on the larger BuaBua grounds located in Lautoka which spreads across the western outskirts of Lautoka. The College is a member many academic associations and recently gained accreditation from the Fiji Government and Fiji Education Board. There has now been over 1000 students enrolled for courses with the college.
