= Kelvin Grove Urban Village =

Area in Brisbane, Queensland, Australia

Coordinates: 27.4543°S 153.0139°E

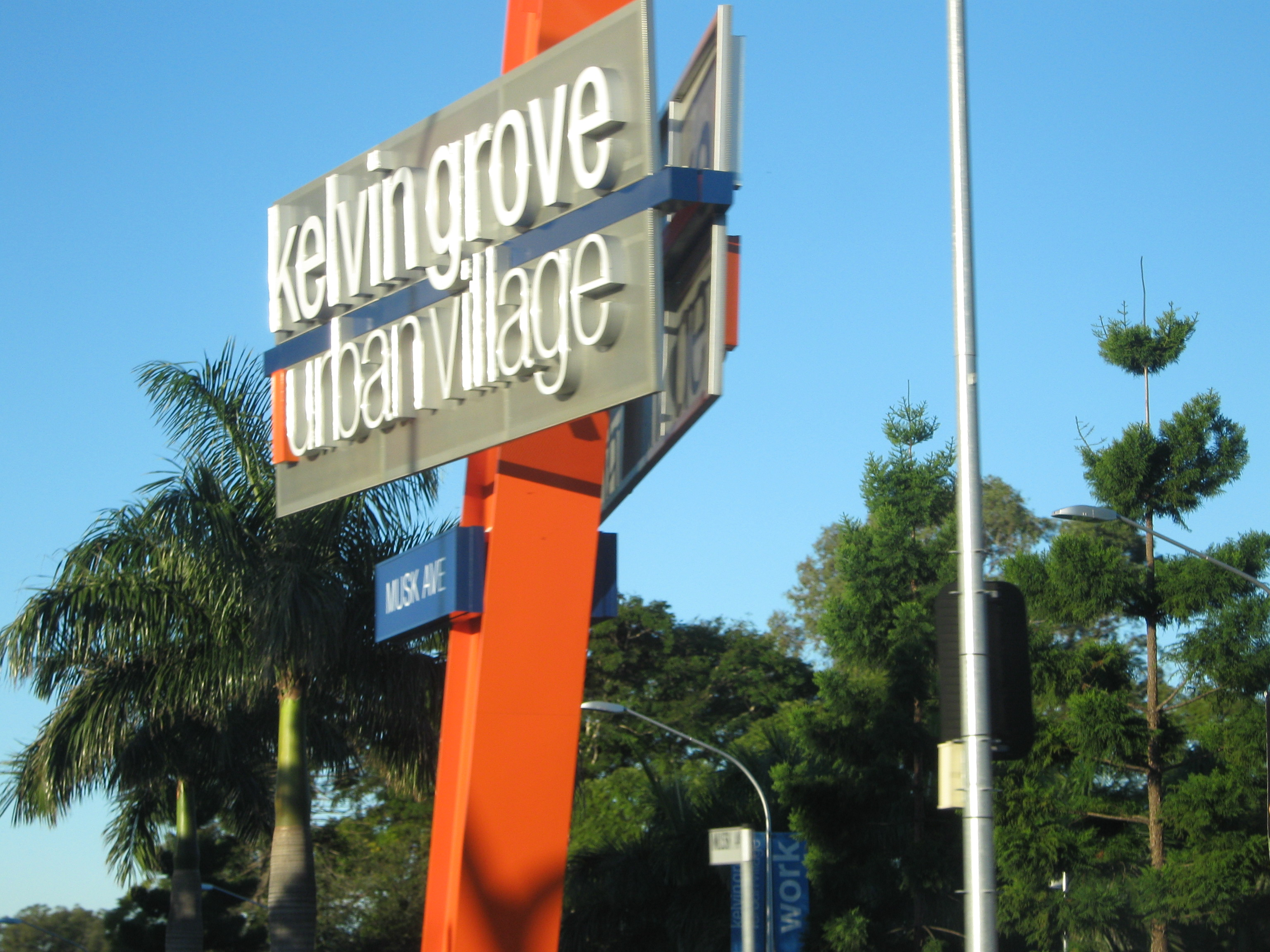
Kelvin Grove Urban Village sign, 2008

The Kelvin Grove Urban Village is an urban village and university precinct in Kelvin Grove, Brisbane, Queensland, Australia that was developed after the closure of the Australian Army's Gona Barracks.

== History ==
The Queensland Department of Housing purchased the Gona Barracks site in 2000 looking for opportunities to develop affordable housing either on the site or funded from the redevelopment of the site. Queensland University of Technology operated its Kelvin Grove campus (formerly the campus of the Brisbane College of Advanced Education and other predecessor institutions) on an adjacent site and desired to expand their campus. Brisbane City Council which controlled adjacent parkland wanted to develop a Local Area Plan that would maximise opportunities for such a large site so close to the Brisbane CBD. Difficulties associated with any redevelopment included the heritage values of the Gona Barracks site (it was listed on the Queensland Heritage Register in 2005), steep slopes and contaminated land.

A heritage assessment of the Gona Barracks site determined that it was the buildings of the upper barracks around the parade ground that, as a group, were of a greatest significance rather than individual buildings. A partnership between the Queensland Department of Housing, Brisbane City Council and the Queensland University of Technology was formed to develop a mixed-use urban village precinct using the Gona Barracks site and adjacent land. The university built its Creative Industries precinct re-using Gona Barracks buildings and introducing new buildings, sited to reinforce the rectangular form of the Gona barracks parade ground. The re-development won major planning and design awards from the Urban Development Institute of Australia.

Following $23,000,000 on construction of infrastructure, the Kelvin Grove Urban Village was officially opened by Queensland Premier Peter Beattie on Monday 24 November 2003.

== Facilities ==
Unlike most Australian university campuses that comprise a large site for the sole use of the university, the Kelvin Grove Urban Village contains a mix of university buildings (some purpose-built by the university and other buildings leased by the university), apartment blocks, and retail shops. The precinct promotes itself as a hub for creative practice, as it incorporates the QUT Creative Industry Faculty and the Queensland Academy for Creative Industries (a selective senior high school for students wishing to specialise in arts and entertainment).

The university-owned Roundhouse Theatre is used for both educational and commercial purposes. It is Australia's only purpose-built theatre-in-the-round built in 2004 to replace the La Boite Theatre Building (a smaller purpose-built theatre-in-the-round that was no longer commercially viable to operate as a theatre). The Roundhouse Theatre can seat 400 people for central staging (audience on four sides) or 340 people for thrust stage (audience on three sides). The La Boite Theatre Company (Queensland's 2nd largest theatre company) perform at the Roundhouse Theatre.

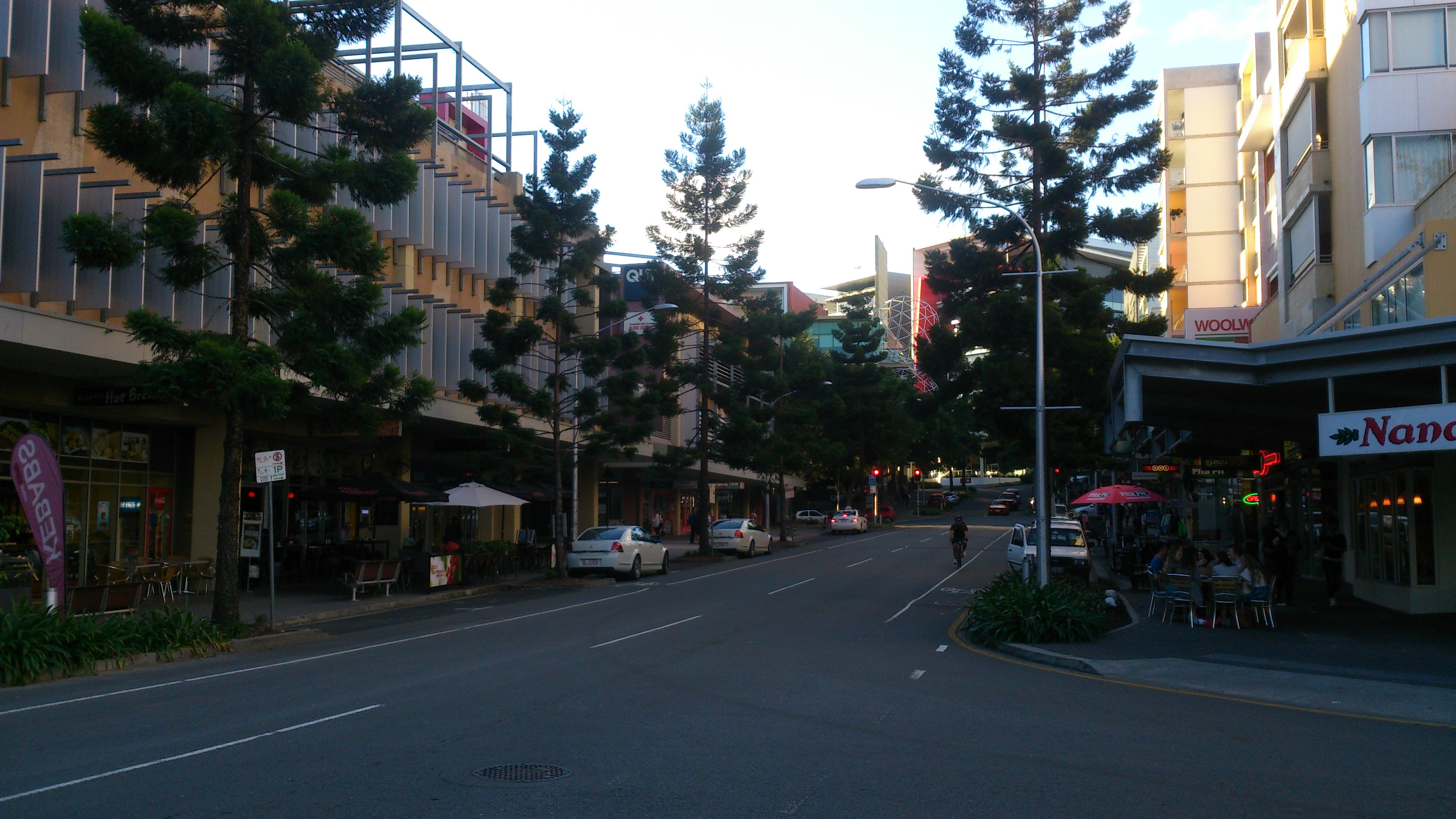
Musk Avenue, viewed from the intersection with Carraway Street.

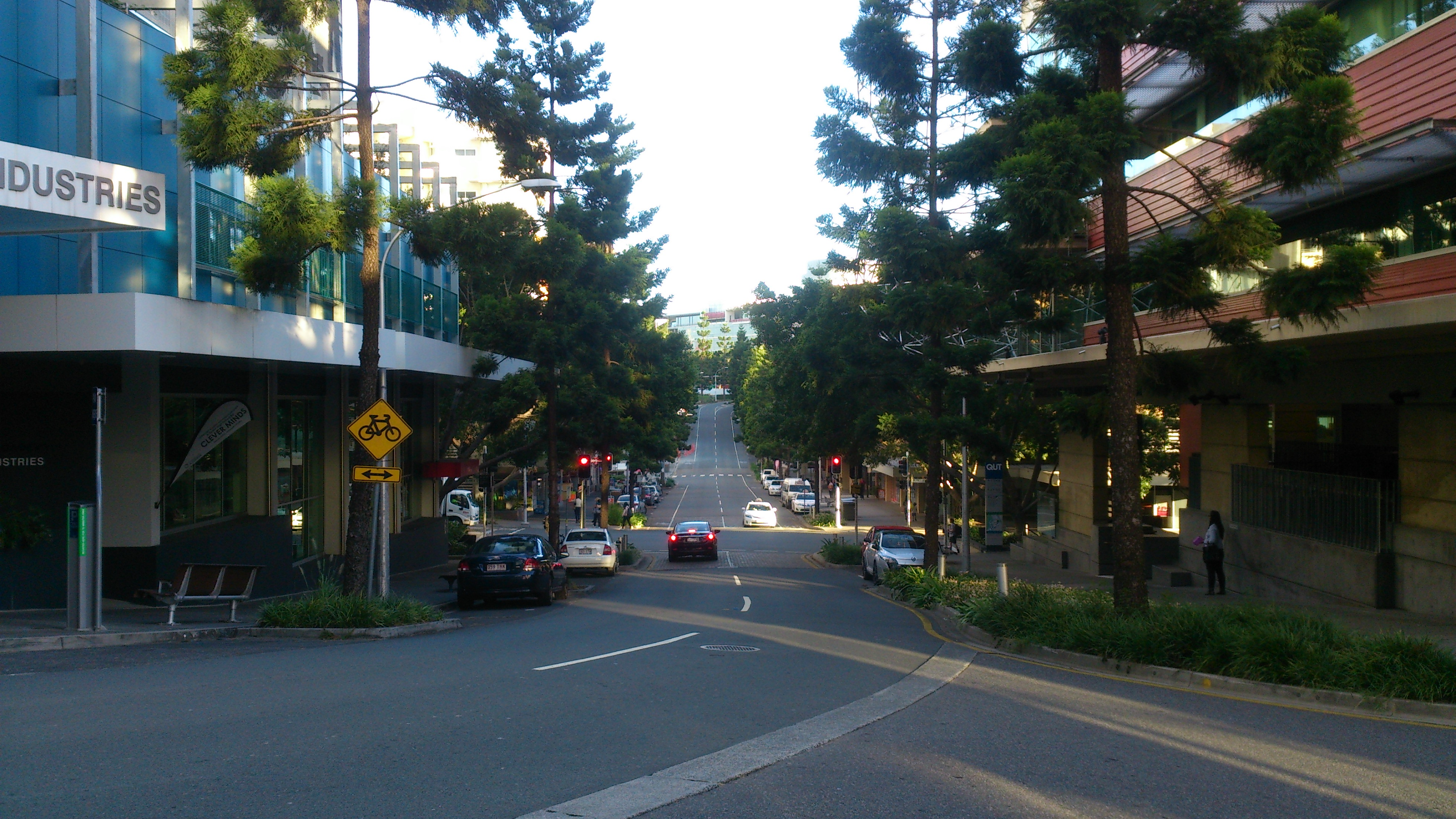
Musk Avenue, viewed from the intersection with Robinson Place.
