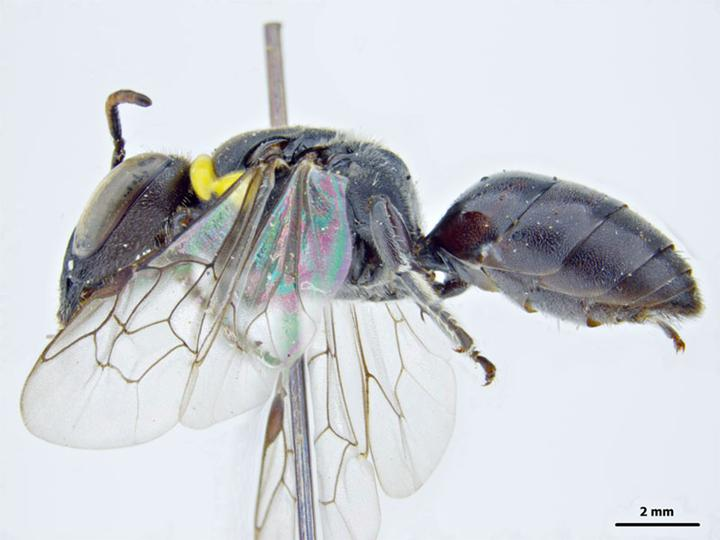
- Female

Scientific classification
- Kingdom: Animalia
- Phylum: Arthropoda
- Clade: Pancrustacea
- Class: Insecta
- Order: Hymenoptera
- Family: Colletidae
- Genus: Hylaeus
- Species: H. kelvini

Binomial name
- Hylaeus kelvini (Cockerell, 1912)

Synonyms
- Prosopis kelvini Cockerell, 1912

= Hylaeus kelvini =

Species of bee

Hylaeus kelvini, or Hylaeus (Xenohylaeus) kelvini, is a species of bee in the family Colletidae and subfamily Hylaeinae. It is endemic to Australia. It was described by British-American entomologist Theodore Dru Alison Cockerell in 1912.

== Description ==
Female body length is about 8 mm. Integumental colouration is mainly black, with yellow markings.

== Distribution and habitat ==
The species occurs in eastern mainland Australia. The type locality is Kelvin Grove, Queensland. It has also been recorded from Sydney.

== Behaviour ==
The adults are flying mellivores. Flowering plants visited by the bees include Daviesia, Jacksonia and Pultenaea species.

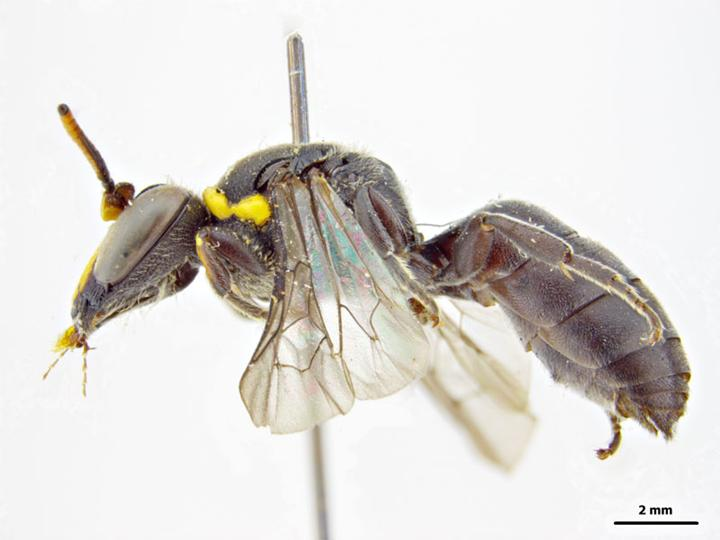
Male
