= Living Environs =

- Industry: Landscape Architecture
- Founded: 2009
- Headquarters: Osborne Park, Western Australia
- Services: Landscape architecture, landscape construction, home improvement and project management
- Website: www.livingenvirons.com.au

Living Environs is a Perth-based construction company that provides landscape architecture, landscape construction, home improvement and project management services.

== History ==
Established in 2009, Living Environs worked on numerous landscape and home improvement projects and has been mainly noted for designing and constructing outdoor spaces like backyards, pools and alfresco entertainment areas for residential homes. The company is reported to prepare a 3D 'walk through' CAD before going ahead with the project which allows the home owner to visualize the project and make required design changes before making modifications to their outdoor space.

In March 2011, the company became a member of Urban Development Institute of Australia. The company is also a member of HIA and MBA. Living Environs was noted among 2013 BRW Fast Starters and ranked in the top 100 in the Startup Smart Awards that same year.
