= Kelvin Grove State College buildings =

- Location within Queensland
- 27.4496°S 153.0128°E
- Location: L'Estrange Terrace, Kelvin Grove, City of Brisbane, Queensland, Australia

History
- Design period: 1914–1919 (World War I)
- Built: 1918–1919, 1930, 1948–1950, 1950–1952, 1955, 1961–1963, 1961–1963, 1961, unknown–2003

Site notes
- Architect: Queensland Department of Public Works
- Architectural style: Modernism

Queensland Heritage Register
- Official name: Kelvin Grove State College; Kelvin Grove Road Provisional School; Kelvin Grove Boys State School; Kelvin Grove Girls and Infants State School; Kelvin Grove State School; Kelvin Grove State High School
- Type: state heritage
- Designated: 23 August 2018
- Reference no.: 650080
- Type: Education, Research, Scientific Facility: School – state (high); Education, Research, Scientific Facility: School – state (intermediate); Education, Research, Scientific Facility: School – state (primary)
- Theme: Educating Queenslanders: Providing primary schooling; Educating Queenslanders: Providing secondary education

Kelvin Grove State College buildings are a heritage-listed group of state school buildings at Kelvin Grove State College on L'Estrange Terrace, Kelvin Grove, City of Brisbane, Queensland, Australia. They were designed by Queensland Department of Public Works and built from 1918 to 1919. The school has a long history with a number of schools being its predecessors: Kelvin Grove Road Provisional School, Kelvin Grove Boys State School, Kelvin Grove Girls and Infants State School, Kelvin Grove State School, and Kelvin Grove State High School. The group of school buildings was added to the Queensland Heritage Register on 23 August 2018.

== History ==
Kelvin Grove is a suburb of Brisbane, located approximately three kilometres northwest of the Brisbane city centre, and was the traditional country of the Jagera and Turrbal peoples. The area was developed primarily as a residential suburb from the 1860s.

Kelvin Grove State College was originally established as a primary school in 1875. In the 1950s it underwent a major redevelopment to create separate primary and infants schools that were regarded as leading examples of school architecture in the post-war period in Queensland. In 1960 the infants school was converted into a high school and the grounds were expanded. The two schools amalgamated in 2002 to become an independent public school with junior, middle and senior campuses. The school complex retains significant 1950s and 1960s buildings set within landscaped grounds including entrance gateways, purpose-designed forecourts, assembly and play areas, and a pedestrianised road.

=== Kelvin Grove Road School, 1875–1887 ===
Local residents began fundraising for the establishment of a primary school on the Northern Road (renamed Kelvin Grove Road in the 1880s) in 1874 and a 1.66ha site (Portion 274) was set aside by the Board of Education. Kelvin Grove Road School was opened on 3 May 1875, costing £600 with a community contribution of £150. The establishment of schools was considered an essential step in the development of early communities and integral to their success. Schools became a community focus, a symbol of progress, and a source of pride, with enduring connections formed with past pupils, parents, and teachers. School facilities also provided a venue for a wide range of community events.

=== Kelvin Grove Boys State School and Kelvin Grove Girls and Infants State School, 1887–1950 ===
The school grew in 1886 when a separate boys' school was built on a triangular site excised from Victoria Park on the other side of Victoria Park Road. The girls and infants school remained on the 1875 site and the schools reopened on 7 November 1887 as Kelvin Grove Boys State School and Kelvin Grove Girls and Infants State School. The school bell from the 1875 school was moved to the boys school after 1887. The school grounds were beautified by tree plantings on Arbor Day from the 1890s until the 1930s.

In 1918 a World War I (WWI) honour board was unveiled in the boys school to commemorate the contribution of Kelvin Grove students and staff. It listed the names of 168 teachers and scholars and one nurse. In 1919 a memorial gateway was constructed at the main entrance of the boys school, on the corner of L'Estrange Terrace and Victoria Park Road. It was designed and built by D Walker of Kelvin Grove and cost £24, which was raised by subscription. Made from reinforced concrete, it featured an ornamental lintel bearing the words "HONOUR OUR BOYS".

To beautify the school grounds, in 1930 a brick and concrete gateway was constructed at the southwest corner of the girls and infants school. It was officially opened on 6 June as part of Arbor Day celebrations.

In 1930 it was reported 757 girls and 527 boys attended the schools at Kelvin Grove, and the girls and infants school was described as the largest in Queensland. Some of the accommodation pressure on the timber school buildings was relieved in 1935 when the North Brisbane Intermediate School opened nearby, accommodating the two upper classes from each school.

During World War II (WWII), the boys school was occupied by the army. Site improvements were carried out in 1946 when new fences and concrete retaining walls were constructed around the school perimeters, including along the boundary with Victoria Park Road.

=== Kelvin Grove State School, 1950–2002, and Kelvin Grove State Infants School 1950–1961 ===
After WWII the existing timber buildings had become inadequate to cope with the growing student population at Kelvin Grove. In nearby Victoria Park, permanent huts constructed by the Allied forces had been converted into temporary housing in what became the second largest temporary housing settlement in Brisbane. By 1950 Victoria Park was the impermanent home for 460 families, which placed a high demand on the Kelvin Grove schools.

The Department of Public Instruction was largely unprepared for the enormous demand for state education that began in the late 1940s and continued well into the 1960s. This was a nation-wide occurrence resulting from immigration and the unprecedented population growth now termed the "baby boom", as well as a shortage of architects and skilled tradesmen. In order to cope, by the early 1950s the Department of Public Works (DPW) had developed new standard timber school buildings that were quick to construct, and also began importing pre-fabricated building systems from overseas. Construction of large masonry school buildings, which had been commonplace during the inter-war period, was no longer favoured, and only a few were completed in the immediate post-WWII period.

In April 1947 the Minister for Education, T L Williams, announced that two new, brick, co-educational school buildings would be built at Kelvin Grove to replace the old timber buildings - a primary school on the site of the girls and infants school and an infants school on the site of the boys school. In November 1947 a design concept and site plan were prepared by architect Leslie Sturmer Jacobson, an Associate of the Royal Institute of British Architects (ARIBA), who was one of four newly arrived British architects recently recruited by the DPW. The new buildings were conceived as a complementary pair, addressing opposite corners of the intersection of L'Estrange Terrace and Victoria Park Road. They were to be modern in appearance and feature prominent central entrance bays - rectangular for the primary school and curved for the infants school.

These buildings were designed at a time of transition, when the large Depression-era brick schools were being criticised for their appearance and unsuitability to modern educational philosophies. Queensland school design was changing in response to international influences, including that of the British Board of Education, which advocated adaptable designs in a less formal style, with the option for future enlargement. Educationalists wanted schools that were constructed of modern materials with attractive and modern coloured interiors. In the DPW design office, the design influences of the new British and other émigré architects were being adopted. While the majority of school buildings continued to be built to standard plans, some individually-designed masonry buildings were constructed, typically in areas of stable, suburban and urban populations. An evolution of the Depression-era brick school buildings, they were generally substantial structures of brick and concrete that introduced many innovative ideas that found their way into standard plans. For example, brick was progressively used more frequently in high schools as standard. New brick buildings were stripped of revival-style ornamentation in favour of a simpler, more streamlined aesthetic, with new features such as horizontal concrete window hoods introduced. For the Kelvin Grove schools, the concept plans and site layout for the schools, designed by Jacobsen, were further developed by other DPW architects, who prepared the detailed plans.

The primary school building was built first at a cost of £54,000. Features of the design included excellent natural lighting and ventilation, a medical inspection room and a visual education room. On 30 October 1948, at the laying of the foundation stone, the Minister for Public Works, Bill Power (the local member of the Queensland Legislative Assembly for Baroona), who had been instrumental in getting support for the project, said that the school would be the most up-to-date in Australia.

The primary school building (called Block JA in 2018) opened on 29 January 1950 and accommodated up to 460 students. It was a linear building with angled ends, arranged symmetrically along a diagonal axis from the northern corner of the site. Two levels of classrooms addressed the front of the school while a partially below-ground understorey level, containing toilets and play areas, opened onto the rear playground. The entrance bay contained a stairwell, entrance hall, the head master's office, and a medical inspection room on the ground floor; a visual education room and projection room on the first floor; and store rooms in the understorey. Circulation was via a corridor along the northern side of the building so that the 10 classrooms (6.7m x 7.2m) received southern daylight. On each classroom level, folding doors separated the three middle classrooms and two large cloakrooms occupied the wedge-shaped spaces in the angled corners of the building. The ends accommodated stairwells; staff common rooms on the ground floor; open-air teaching balconies on the first floor (enclosed prior to the completion of the building); and staff toilets in the understorey. The windows were linked by continuous concrete sills and horizontal hoods which gave the building a streamlined, horizontal appearance.

Construction of the infants school building (known as Block SA and SB in 2018) commenced in 1950. It cost £55,700 and was opened by William Power, now the Attorney General, on 17 May 1952. Due to the angular site, it was V-shaped in plan, with two classroom wings linked by the curved entrance bay, which contained a kindergarten room at ground level. Professional training for teaching infants developed in Queensland around 1891, however the first purpose-built state infants schools (from 1911) were not notably different from other classrooms of the period. Frequently, open-air annexes (a standard type, introduced in 1914) were added to existing schools as infants' classrooms. Special designs for infants developed in the 1930s incorporated a large kindergarten room where children sat in a circle around the teacher, a practice that continued after WWII. Only two other masonry infants buildings were built around the same time as Kelvin Grove, at Bardon State School (1947) and Brisbane Central State School (designed 1949, completed 1952).

On completion, the Infants School at Kelvin Grove accommodated up to 440 infants. On the ground floor of the entrance bay, the main door led into the large kindergarten room and side entrances were located adjacent to two stairwells. The wings contained play areas that opened onto the rear playground, and toilets at the ends. The first floor accommodated eight classrooms (6.7m x 7m) and two cloakrooms in the wings, with teachers rooms and a medical room in the entrance bay. Circulation was via a corridor that ran along the northern side of each wing so that classrooms received southern daylight.

The design of both buildings included landscaping works to create formal front forecourts and defined main entrances from the corners. The forecourts comprised symmetrical layouts of concrete paths, stairs, lawns, and garden beds. Asphalted play and assembly areas were built at the rear of the buildings.

The schools received praise in newspapers and other publications for their amenity and modern design. The infants school was described as "roomy and bright", and that it represented "a departure from the ordinary style of construction". The Courier-Mail stated, 'Brisbane's modern new State schools should make for happier, healthier learning...', and The Telegraph claimed the school was "officially regarded as the best State primary school in Queensland architecturally." The Architecture, Building, Engineering journal ranked the infants building as one of the best state schools in Australia.

On completion of the Infants School, the original school bell (1870s) and the WWI Honour Board were moved to the primary school. The 1919 memorial gateway lintel was also moved to the primary school site, along L'Estrange Terrace, and re-erected on new concrete posts.

In 1953 four classes of pupils returned to the Kelvin Grove primary school due to the closure of the North Brisbane Intermediate School. During 1955, a new brick building (called Block JB in 2018) was built adjacent to Block JA. It accommodated three classrooms over an understorey and featured a glazed front porch. Its external appearance complemented Block JA by using similar materials and fenestration.

=== Kelvin Grove State High School 1961–2002 ===
In 1960 approval was given to convert the infants school into a state high school. Enrolments had dropped to under 200 at the infants school and under 700 in the primary school due to the closure of the Victoria Park housing settlement. Infants classes were transferred to the primary school, and the infants school site was extended into the adjacent reserve to the east, to provide space for new buildings and sporting facilities.

The first new classroom block built was an extension to the southern wing of the former infants building (part of Block SA in 2018, referred to as Block SA Extension in this report). It accommodated a tuckshop and chemistry classrooms on the ground floor and domestic science classrooms on the first floor.

Kelvin Grove State High School opened 23 January 1961 with an enrolment of 344 students, some of whom had to be accommodated in temporary classrooms built into the understorey of Block SA/SB. Enrolments had risen to 850 by the start of the 1962 school year; and to 886 by 1963.

A second extension to the former infants building was built at a right angle to the northern wing (called Block SC in 2018) and was completed in early 1963. This accommodated toilets, locker rooms and staff rooms at the junction, physics and general classrooms on the ground floor, and commercial, art, and general classrooms on the first floor. A covered walkway was also built to link Block SA Extension and Block SC.

The plan form that resulted, with buildings one room wide with verandahs for circulation and angled around an open-ended courtyard, was characteristic of the organic planning principles first adopted by the DPW in the 1950s, where classroom wings were connected to and fanned away from a central nucleus. Master planning schemes were focussed on the ideal solar orientation of buildings as well as their relationship to the natural contours, resulting in asymmetrical building layouts. Spaces captured between buildings created playground areas and courtyards. At Kelvin Grove, the former infants building was retained as the nucleus and main entrance to the high school.

The new buildings had expressed concrete framework with lightweight infill panels, and incorporated contemporary materials and fenestration, such as ribbed metal panels, awning windows and adjustable louvres. Their tiled gable roofs and facebrick ends were complementary to the school's 1950s buildings. The main entrance to Block SA Extension, through the stairwell at the junction with Block SA, incorporated a tile-clad wall and a raised planting bed with decorative brickwork. The classrooms (7.3m wide) were linked by verandahs with bag rack balustrades, and standard arrangements of classrooms, storerooms and facilities were provided for specific subjects.

The steeply sloping site of the high school required major ground works to prepare it for development. By c. 1963 a driveway was built to the east of Block SC, running from L'Estrange Terrace to Victoria Park Road at the intersection with Tank Street. During 1963 the Parents and Citizens Committee assisted with the terracing of the valley to the northeast of the high school, enabling the construction of tennis courts, basketball courts and an oval.

A large, brick veneer manual training building (called Block SD in 2018) was built to the southeast of the other buildings, along Victoria Park Road, between 1961 and 1963. Built as a modified version of a standard early-1960s plan, it accommodated six workshops (woodwork, metalwork, and drawing rooms, each approx. 9.3 x 8m) male toilets, machine room, store room, and staffroom. It was a long narrow building with a steel portal frame structure and clerestory windows. It was predominantly of brick construction with lightweight infill panels of crimped metal and glazing. Normally single storey, at Kelvin Grove a partial understorey, accommodating an open recreation area, was added to the building, due to the slope of the land.

On 30 April 1963, the high school held a function to celebrate the official opening of the school. Over the following decades, further high school buildings were constructed to the east and southeast of the c. 1963 driveway.

In c. 1977 alterations to Block SA/SB were carried out. The ground floor play areas were enclosed and partitioned to form staff offices (Block SB) and classrooms (Block SA). Partitioning of the former kindergarten room formed a reception and administration area, and partitions were removed from the first floor of the entrance bay to form a staff common room.

In c. 1984 Block JB was altered to form a library on the first floor. Folding partitions between classrooms were removed and the wall between two classrooms and the corridor was demolished. Further alterations occurred in 1990, including demolition of the remaining corridor wall.

In 1995 and 2003, part of the southwest corner of the primary school site was resumed for road widening. Consequently, the 1930 brick gateway was relocated further back on the site. It was reconstructed from modern brickwork and is smaller in size, but retains the 1930 concrete lintel, post caps and marble plaques.

=== Kelvin Grove State College 2002–present ===
In 2002 Kelvin Grove State School and Kelvin Grove State High School were merged to form Kelvin Grove State College. A "Junior School" occupied the former primary school site; and a "Middle School" and "Senior School" shared the former high school site. As part of the merger the school entered a considerable "renewal" program, including alterations to existing buildings and construction of new buildings. Alterations were made to Blocks SA/SB, and SC to accommodate the Middle School, with some verandahs enclosed and internal partitions removed and rearranged. Additions included an awning roof built along the courtyard side of Block SA/SB, and ramps and a lift for equitable access.

In c. 2003, the section of Victoria Park Road running through the school was closed and all but a public footpath amalgamated into the former high school site.

In 2018, Kelvin Grove State College continues to operate from its original sites and retains its 1950s and early-1960s masonry buildings with their associated landscaping. It continues to grow, and has long-established reputation for academic excellence. It is a key social focus for the community, as generations of students have been taught there and many social events held in the school's grounds and buildings since its establishment.

== Description ==
Kelvin Grove State College is located in Kelvin Grove, an inner city residential suburb of Brisbane, about 3 km northwest of the city centre. The college stands on a high point in the terrain near a major road, Kelvin Grove Road, and adjacent to the Queensland University of Technology (QUT) Kelvin Grove campus.

The college comprises two adjacent campuses facing L'Estrange Terrace to the northwest - the Junior School (1.571 hectares) bounded by L'Estrange Terrace, Kelvin Grove Road, School Street and Tank Street; and the larger Middle and Senior School (7.76 hectares) bounded by L'Estrange Terrace, Victoria Park Road, Boundary Road and Herston Road. A closed section of Victoria Park Road runs between and connects the campuses, with a public footpath retained along the Junior School boundary.

The Junior School campus site is approximately square in shape with buildings located around a combined playground and sports field. The ground slopes away to the south, and steep, tree-lined banks run along the northeast and southeast boundaries.

The Middle and Senior School campus site slopes steeply down to the east and southeast, resulting in a terraced landscape with an oval occupying the lowest ground in the northeast corner. The triangular-shaped Middle School section of the campus is separated from the Senior School by a driveway running from L'Estrange Terrace to Victoria Park Road.

The buildings and features of cultural heritage significance are:

- Junior School campus
  - Block JA (1950, Purpose-designed, post-war masonry classroom block).
  - Block JB (1955, Purpose-designed, post-war masonry classroom block).
  - Landscaping features associated with Blocks JA and JB (1950–55).
  - World War I (WWI) Memorial Gateway (1919, 1952).
  - Brick Entrance Gateway elements (1930).
  - School bell (1870s).
- Middle and Senior School campus
  - Block SA/SB (1952, Purpose-designed, post-war masonry classroom block).
  - Landscaping features associated with Block SA/SB (1952).
  - Block SA Extension (1961) and Block SC (1961–63) (Early-1960s masonry high school classroom blocks, including linking covered walkway).
  - Block SD (1961–63, early-1960s brick veneer manual training building).
  - Closed section of Victoria Park Road (closed 2003).
- Site planning and views
  - The relationship between Block JA and Block SA/SB, as evidence of the 1947 site plan to redevelop the school.
  - The relationship between Block SA/SB and its additions, Block SA Extension and Block SC, as evidence of 1960s site planning to convert and expand the Infants School into a High School.
  - Views of Blocks JA and JB and Block SA/SB from L'Estrange Terrace, particularly at the intersection with the closed portion of Victoria Park Road.
  - Views of Blocks JA and JB from the rear playground.
  - Views of Block SA/SB, Block SA Extension and Block SC from the courtyard.
  - Views along the closed portion of Victoria Park Road.

=== Block JA (1950) ===
Block JA is a three-storey building with a hipped roof and a projecting entrance bay that overlooks a triangular forecourt. Due to the slope of the land, the ground floor level is concealed from view from the main (northern) approach. The building's distinctive plan form is symmetrical along an axis running from the main entrance at the northern corner of the site. The building comprises a long central block that terminates with ends angled at 45 degrees, in line with pathways radiating at 90 degrees from the main entrance. The entrance bay protrudes from the building and has flat parapet walls concealing its hipped roof. The external walls have a strong horizontal emphasis due to continuous window sills and horizontal window hoods linking the banks of windows.

The upper two storeys contain classrooms connected by a corridor along the northern sides. Classrooms occupy the long central portion, with staircases, staff rooms and store rooms located in the angled ends of the building. The ground floor contains enclosed play areas in the centre and toilet facilities in the ends. The entrance bay contains a staircase; resource and store rooms on the upper storey; entrance hall, administration and staff offices on the middle storey; and store rooms on the ground floor.

The original 1948 landscaping layout in front of and around Block JA remains intact. It comprises a symmetrical layout of lawns, pathways and stairs in the forecourt and a playground at the rear.

=== Block JB (1955) ===
Block JB is a two-storey, gable-roofed building that addresses L'Estrange Terrace and is aligned with the southwest side of Block JA. Formerly a classroom block, the upper level of Block JB is used as a library in 2017. A tuck shop and storage rooms have been inserted in the covered play area underneath.

Significant landscaping around Block JB includes an extension of the pathway in front of Block JA, edged by a concrete retaining wall topped by tubular steel handrails; and a linking pathway to the WWI Memorial Gateway.

=== World War I Memorial Gateway (1919, 1952) ===
This gateway is located approximately halfway along the L'Estrange Terrace boundary of the Junior School. The lintel (1919) is made from concrete in the form of a scroll and bears the words "HONOUR OUR BOYS" and the dates "1914" and "1919". The supporting posts and wing walls (1952) are of plain, smooth concrete and feature square end posts with chamfered, angled sides and peaked tops.

=== Brick Entrance Gateway elements (1930) ===
This gateway stands at the southwest corner of the Junior School site, on the corner of L'Estrange Terrace and School Street. It is a modern reconstruction, at a smaller scale, of the 1930 brick gateway. The significant elements are: the large, horizontal concrete lintel; peaked concrete caps on the wing wall end posts; and two marble plaques set into the front face of the gateways piers.

=== School bell (1870s) ===
The original school bell is mounted on a concrete post near the entrance to Block JA.

=== Block SA/SB (1952) ===
Block SA/SB is a two-storey building with a hipped roof and a curved entrance bay that links two long wings to form a V-shaped plan. The building sits on a high point in the terrain and is approached by a series of pathways and steps leading to a triangular platform in front of the main entrance. The plan is symmetrical along an axis running from the main entrance at the northwest corner of the site, with the two wings parallel to the bounding streets - L'Estrange Terrace (Block SB) and the closed section of Victoria Park Road (Block SA). The concave, curved facade of the entrance bay is topped by a flat parapet and features a projecting entrance porch with a flat concrete roof and glazed front wall. Windows to the upper floor of the entrance bay have thick concrete mullions which align with the columns of the entrance porch. The external walls of the wings have a strong horizontal emphasis due to continuous window sills and horizontal window hoods linking the banks of windows.

The entrance bay contains reception areas and staff rooms. The wing of Block SA contains classrooms on both levels and toilets at the southeast end of the ground floor. Block SB has classrooms on the first floor and administration offices on the ground floor. Circulation is via two staircases at each end of the entrance bay, and long corridors through the wings – the northeast (rear) side of Block SA and the northwest (front) side of Block SB. Original staircases at the ends of each wing and toilets on the ground floor of Block SB have been demolished in order to link with the 1960s extensions.

The exterior remains largely intact, however the internal layout has been modified within the original concrete frame to create the administration and reception areas. Most walls between classrooms and the corridors have been removed.

The original landscaping layout in front of and around Block SA/SB remains intact. It comprises a symmetrical layout of pathways, planter boxes and stairs leading up to the main entrance and a courtyard at the rear.

=== Block SA Extension (1961) and Block SC (1961–63) ===
In their dimensions, structure, materials and room layouts Block SA Extension and Block SC are typical early-1960s high school classroom blocks, but the exteriors have been modified to complement the style of the early-1950s buildings. These modifications include the hipped roofs clad in terracotta tiles, and the brick-enclosed ends of the blocks, punctuated by single rectangular windows with projecting concrete frames.

Block SA Extension has been extended in line with Block SA along Victoria Park Road, and is linked to it by a stairwell and secondary entrance. Block SC has been built at a right angle to the end of Block JB, with a corridor, toilets and a stairwell in the brick-enclosed junction. Linking Blocks SA Extension and SC across the courtyard is a covered walkway. Both blocks are two storey, with verandahs providing circulation along the courtyard-facing sides of the blocks.

The classrooms occupy both floors of each block, with a tuck shop on the ground floor of Block SA Extension. The original layout of large rooms with narrow preparation areas between is still evident.

=== Block SD (1961–63) ===
Block SD is located along the Victoria Park Road boundary. It is a long, narrow building with an understorey below the northern end (now enclosed). Six work rooms are arranged along the northeast side, separated by a wide, open corridor from a row of rooms containing service and store rooms and toilets. Entrances are via double doors at each end of the corridor and one in the centre of the southwest wall.

=== Closed section of Victoria Park Road (closed c. 2003) ===
The road is lined with mature trees, and the road surface and a public footpath are retained.

== Heritage listing ==
Kelvin Grove State College was listed on the Queensland Heritage Register on 23 August 2018 having satisfied the following criteria.

The place is important in demonstrating the evolution or pattern of Queensland's history.

Kelvin Grove State College (established in 1875) is important in demonstrating the evolution of state education and its associated architecture in Queensland. The place retains excellent, representative examples of government-designed school buildings that were architectural responses to prevailing government educational philosophies, set in landscaped grounds with sporting facilities and assembly and play areas.

The school retains two representative examples of post-World War II (WWII) suburban brick state school buildings (Block JA, 1950, and Block SA/SB, 1952) that are important in demonstrating the evolution of Queensland state school architecture in the post-WWII period, and were lauded at the time as being exemplars of the Queensland Government's new approach to school design.

The World War I (WWI) Honour Board (1918) and WWI Memorial Gateway lintel (1919, relocated 1952) are important in demonstrating the school community's involvement in a major world event. War memorials are a tribute from the community to those who served, and those who died. They are an important element of Queensland's towns and cities and are also important in demonstrating a common pattern of commemoration across Queensland and Australia.

The place is important in demonstrating the principal characteristics of a particular class of cultural places.

Kelvin Grove State College is important in demonstrating the principal characteristics of a post-war suburban primary school complex and a 1960s suburban high school complex. These include: two distinct site planning arrangements; a range of high quality masonry buildings designed by the DPW; and a generous, landscaped site with assembly areas and sporting facilities.

Blocks JA (1950) and SA/SB (1952) and their forecourts demonstrate the principal characteristics of a post-war school site plan, being arranged symmetrically along an axis and featuring prominent central entrance bays. The high school extensions to Block SA/SB demonstrate the principal characteristics of organic site planning principles developed in the 1950s, with their asymmetrical layout of long, narrow classroom blocks fanning away from a central nucleus, and arranged to follow the contours of the site around an open-ended courtyard.

Blocks JA, JB (1955) and SA/SB demonstrate the principal characteristics of purpose-designed, post-war masonry classroom blocks, with their two or three storey form with ground floor play areas (some now enclosed); high quality design with restrained ornamentation; facebrick exterior; and terracotta tile roofs. The building interiors contain typical linear layouts of classrooms, staff and store rooms, accessed by a single long corridor along the northern side.

High school additions Block SA Extension (1961) and Block SC (1961–63) demonstrate the principal characteristics of early-1960s, masonry high school classroom blocks, with their roof form and aesthetic treatment modified to complement the style of Block SA/SB. The principal characteristics of this type include: expressed concrete framework with lightweight infill panels of ribbed metal and glazing; brick-enclosed ends of the buildings; banks of awning windows; large classrooms linked by verandahs; fixed glazing and combinations of vertical and horizontal louvres to verandah walls; bag rack balustrades; and standard arrangements of rooms and facilities for specific subjects.

Block SD (1961–1963) demonstrates the principal characteristics of an early-1960s, brick veneer manual training building, with its facebrick exterior; lightweight infill panels of ribbed metal and glazing; banks of awning windows and louvres; steel portal frame construction; southern-facing clerestory windows; metal roof cladding; and large work rooms.

The place is important because of its aesthetic significance.

Kelvin Grove State College is important for the aesthetic significance of blocks JA and SA/SB and their forecourts, as they demonstrate beautiful and expressive attributes.

Designed as a complementary pair to be viewed from the intersection of L'Estrange Terrace and Victoria Park Road, these buildings display the beautiful attributes of symmetry and legibility, and are united by their consistent form, scale, high quality materials and aesthetic treatment. Appreciation of their front elevations is enhanced by being set back behind formal, triangular forecourts and approached by a symmetrical layout of pathways and stairs. The buildings and their forecourts remain highly intact and provide an attractive and impressive entrance to the school.

Through their composition and aesthetic treatment, the buildings are expressive of a new phase of school design in Queensland in the post-war period that embraced modern architecture and rejected revival styles. The highly intact exteriors are carefully detailed, with a strong horizontal emphasis, minimal embellishment, and distinctive entrance bays. When complete, the buildings were highly praised for their modern design and amenity, and were described as the best examples of school architecture in Queensland.

The place has a strong or special association with a particular community or cultural group for social, cultural or spiritual reasons.

Schools have always played an important part in Queensland communities. They typically retain significant and enduring connections with former pupils, parents, and teachers; provide a venue for social interaction and volunteer work; and are a source of pride, symbolising local progress and aspirations.

Kelvin Grove State College has a strong and ongoing association with the surrounding community. It was established on the Junior School site in 1875 through the fundraising efforts of the local community, has expanded to include both primary and high school education, and generations of children have been taught there. The place is important for its contribution to the educational development of the community and is a prominent community focal point and gathering place for social and commemorative events with widespread community support.
