= AMA House, Brisbane =

AMA House
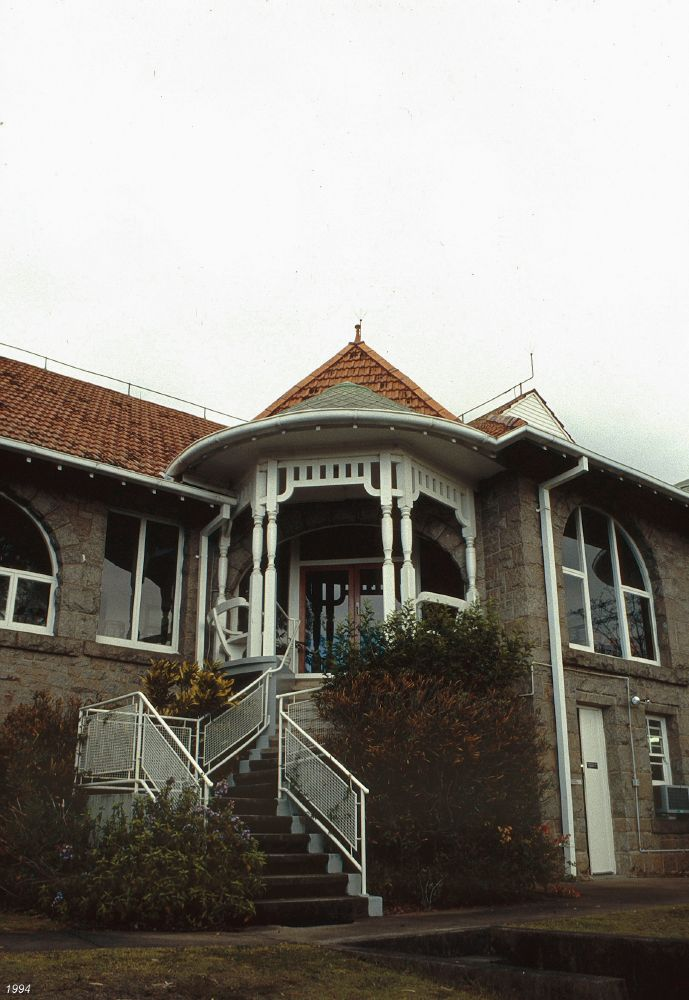
- AMA House, 1994

- Location within Queensland Location within Australia
- 27.4479°S 153.0144°E
- Location: 1/88 L'Estrange Terrace, Kelvin Grove, City of Brisbane, Queensland, Australia

History
- Design period: 1900–1914 (early 20th century)
- Built: c. 1914–c. 1916

Queensland Heritage Register
- Official name: AMA House, BMA House, Hunstanton
- Type: state heritage (landscape, built)
- Designated: 4 July 1995
- Reference no.: 601358
- Significant period: 1910s (fabric); 1910s, 1950s– (historical)
- Significant components: garden – bed/s, residential accommodation – main house, driveway, views from, trees/plantings, other – residential: component, lead light/s, tower – observation/lookout, basement / sub-floor, garden/grounds, fence/wall – perimeter

AMA House is a heritage-listed villa at 1/88 L'Estrange Terrace, Kelvin Grove, City of Brisbane, Queensland, Australia. It was built from c. 1914 to c. 1916. It is also known as AMA House and Hunstanton. It was added to the Queensland Heritage Register on 4 July 1995.

== History ==
This two-storeyed stone house was erected c. 1914 for William Mandeville Ellis L'Estrange, a prominent electrical engineer who arrived in Queensland in 1887.

Family records note that from the late 1870s until the early 1890s, L'Estrange worked as an assistant to the Surveyor for the Logan District, during which time he also owned and farmed land in the Upper Coomera district. In 1893 L'Estrange commenced work with Edward Barton of the electrical firm Barton and White. In 1896 L'Estrange left Australia to study in England and Germany, later working for the General Electric Company in the United States of America.

L'Estrange returned to Brisbane probably during the late 1890s, and became Secretary of the Brisbane Electric Supply Company Limited, which was reconstructed to become the City Electric Light Company in 1904. From the early 1900s until the late 1930s, L'Estrange maintained his involvement with electricity supply in the Brisbane area, serving as Secretary of the Ipswich Electric Supply Company and as a Director of the City Electric Light Company. L'Estrange was also a prominent member of the Queensland Institute of Engineers, and of the Brisbane division of the Institution of Engineers, Australia. During the late 1920s and early 1930s L'Estrange was also involved with the University of Queensland Senate.

In 1900 L'Estrange married Mary Emmeline Alder, daughter of EH Alder, Chief Inspector of Public Works for Queensland. L'Estrange had acquired the land on which Huntstanton was erected by mid 1914.

The architect of Huntstanton is not known, although family records speculate that the house was possibly designed by either L'Estrange or Barton, a relative of L'Estrange. The stone for the house was quarried reputedly at The Gap. It has been suggested that L'Estrange owned quarries at The Gap and at Grovely. It is understood that the verandah, hall and other indoor tiles were imported from either Italy or France, whilst the roof tiles bear the imprint of their manufacture in Marseille, France.

Family history records that for a short time the L'Estranges lived with Mary's mother in Clyde Road Herston, moving to Huntstanton c. 1916.

In 1929 L'Estrange sold Huntstanton to Brisbane medical practitioner Dr James Vincent Duhig, nephew of Archbishop James Duhig. Duhig had studied medicine at Sydney University, prior to serving as a medical officer in the Australian Imperial Forces from 1917 until 1919. Following the war Duhig studied pathology at King's College Hospital in London, before returning to Australia where he practiced as a pathologist from 1920, and established pathology laboratories at the Mater Misericordiae Hospital also in 1920, and at the Brisbane General Hospital in 1924. Duhig is described as being a militant campaigner for the establishment of a medical school at the University of Queensland, and in 1938 he became the first professor of pathology at the university. Duhig also founded the Red Cross Blood Bank in Queensland.

In October 1955, Duhig offered Huntstanton for sale to the then Queensland Branch of the British Medical Association (BMA).

The inaugural meeting of the Queensland Branch of the BMA was held in Brisbane in May 1894, the role of the association being to advance the cause of medical science. There had previously been three attempts to form a medical association in Queensland; in 1871, 1882 and in 1886 as the Queensland Medical Society which eventually amalgamated with the Queensland Branch of the BMA in 1900. The first headquarters of the Queensland Branch of the BMA was a property in Adelaide Street, acquired by the association in 1912. In 1936 the association moved to a building on Wickham Terrace, which it named BMA House. By the 1950s, additional facilities were required by the association, and estimates were prepared for the erection of a new building on land behind BMA House.

Following Duhig's offer in 1955, the association rescinded its plans to develop the Wickham Terrace property, and purchased Huntstanton, renaming it BMA House. Possibly also a factor influencing the association's decision, was the location of Huntstanton in close proximity to both the city and the Brisbane Hospital and the Medical School. The first meeting of the association in its new premises was held in December 1957. The name of the building was changed to AMA House in 1963, reflecting the change from the BMA to the Australian Medical Association.

A hall and additional office space was required by the early 1960s, and plans were prepared by the firm of Lange Powell, Dods and Thorpe for a new building to the northwest of AMA House. The new building was connected to AMA House via a walkway, and was officially opened in 1965, becoming the main administration building for the AMA. Alterations undertaken to AMA House have included the erection of partitions, and enclosing the verandah along the northeast side of the building with glass.

The AMA continues to use AMA House as a venue for meetings and functions, and a library/archive is also located in the building. Parts of the ground and first floor area are presently (May 1995) leased to private firms.

== Description ==
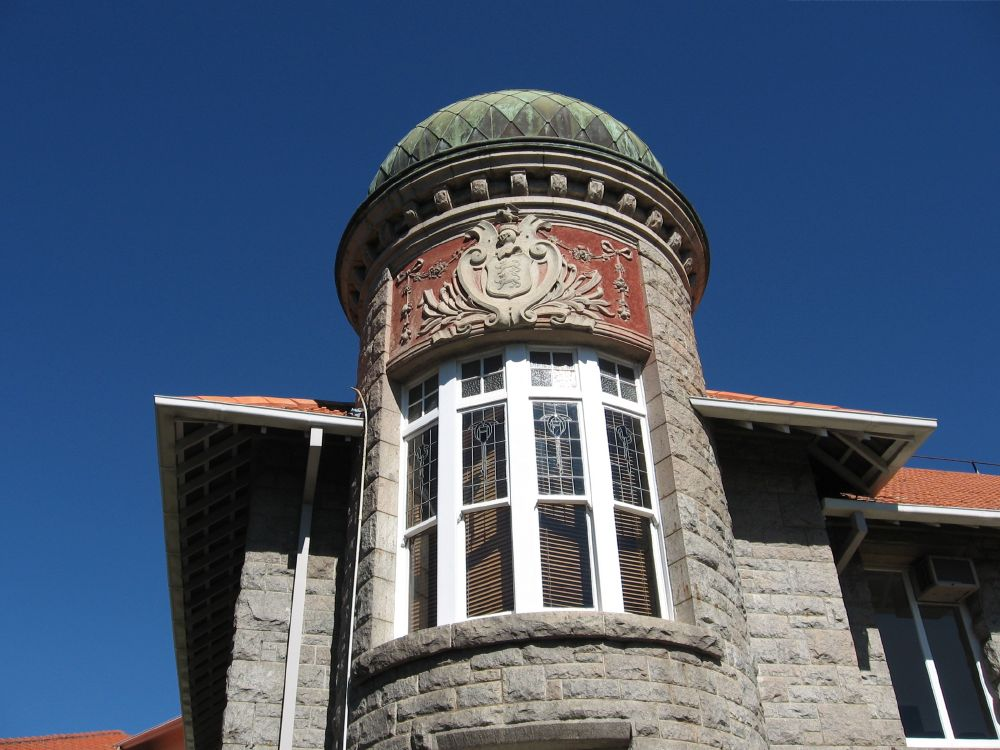
Oriel window, 2008

AMA House is a two storeyed house, with external faces clad in rough-cut granite. The building is on the highest part of the block, facing NNE, with expansive views of the surrounding suburbs. The property is entered via a driveway from L'Estrange Terrace which extends to the front of house. A large granite fence, with a tall circular fence post, bounds the property from L'Estrange Terrace on the eastern side of the driveway. Several large, established trees and early gardens are found around the house.

AMA House is asymmetrically arranged, with a T-shaped plan running east–west, with the transverse section at the western end. The house has a gabled roof with overhanging eaves, of Marsailles terracotta interlocking tiles, with several variously shaped sections emphasising elements of the plan. The house has steel members used in otherwise loadbearing construction.

The northern elevation features an attached circular tower at the eastern end, protruding over the roof line. The tower, which is a feature element of the exterior of the house, is roofed with an onion shaped copper tiled dome, surmounted by a simple finial. A large crest carved into the face of the granite and partially painted red, is featured on the tower, directly below the dome. At the western end of the northern facade, is a full-length projecting circular bay, similar in size and scale to the tower at the other end. The bay features window openings with curved glass and leadlight glazing. The western facade features a rectangular oriel window on the first storey, supported on oversized carved granite corbels. Below this is the principal entrance to the lower floor, through double timber doors, large enough for use as garage doors.

The first floor of the building forms the original principal living and dining space, and the lower floor housed a garage or carriage storage, the kitchen and possibly servant's quarters. The main entrance to the house is on the northern facade, via a curved concrete stair, which terminates at a small porch on the first floor. The porch, emphasised by a discrete conical, copper tiled roof, is defined by pairs of turned timber columns joined by a timber frieze. The timber balustrade of the porch is integrated with a seating element.

The first floor of the house has a reasonably open plan, which later walls have disguised to some extent. A large verandah on the north side of the house and a breezeway through the house to a morning room, to the south of the entrance form the open spaces, which are different in treatment to the rooms. The verandah, which accounts for nearly half of the width of the house, has large arched openings, with rough-cut granite quoining, with marble sill. These openings are also found in the morning room. Ceramic tiles are found on both the floor and walls of the verandah, black and white chequer-pattern tiles on the floor and glossy brown tiles, with painted feature tiles, to dado height on the walls.

The breezeway is interrupted by an early concrete storage space around which a timber stair to the lower floor winds. The first floor has several elements of high-quality timber joinery, including architraves, window framing and skirtings. The lower floor is a more rudimentary space, with lower ceilings, very little decorative treatment and plain concrete dividing walls.

The house adjoins a more recent building via a walkway from an existing opening on the first floor.

== Heritage listing ==
AMA House was listed on the Queensland Heritage Register on 4 July 1995 having satisfied the following criteria.

The place is important in demonstrating the evolution or pattern of Queensland's history.

The house provides early evidence of internal open planning.

The place demonstrates rare, uncommon or endangered aspects of Queensland's cultural heritage.

The construction technique, including the steel members used in the framing and the granite cladding is unusual for a house of the 1910s.

The place is important in demonstrating the principal characteristics of a particular class of cultural places.

The house is a good example of architecture influenced by the Arts and Crafts movement and adapted to tropical climate.

The place is important because of its aesthetic significance.

AMA House has considerable aesthetic value, the external massing, materials and detailing which combine to create a picturesque quality.

The place has a special association with the life or work of a particular person, group or organisation of importance in Queensland's history.

Erected by William L'Estrange, a prominent electrical engineer involved in the supply of electricity in Brisbane during the early twentieth century, and located on L'Estrange Terrace, AMA House has an association with L'Estrange.

AMA House is also important for its associations with prominent Brisbane Doctor, JV Duhig, and the Queensland Branch of the Australian Medical Association.
