= Kelvin Grove Fig Trees and Air Raid Shelter =

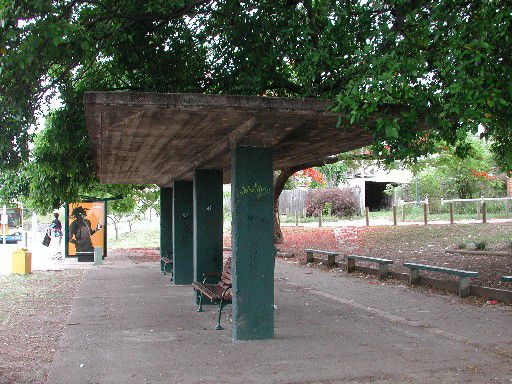
- Kelvin Grove Air Raid Shelter surrounded by fig trees

- Location within Queensland Location within Australia
- 27.451421°S 153.010720°E
- Location: 176 Kelvin Grove Road, Kelvin Grove, City of Brisbane, Queensland, Australia

History
- Design period: 1900–1914 (early 20th century)
- Built: c. 1909–1942

Queensland Heritage Register
- Official name: Kelvin Grove Fig Trees and Air Raid Shelter
- Type: state heritage (built, landscape)
- Designated: 31 May 2005
- Reference no.: 602196
- Significant period: 1942 (fabric) c. 1909–c. 1925, 1942 (historical)
- Significant components: trees/plantings, air raid shelter

Kelvin Grove Fig Trees and Air Raid Shelter are heritage-listed trees and air raid shelter at 176 Kelvin Grove Road, Kelvin Grove, City of Brisbane, Queensland, Australia. It was built from c. 1909 to 1942. It was added to the Queensland Heritage Register on 31 May 2005.

== History ==
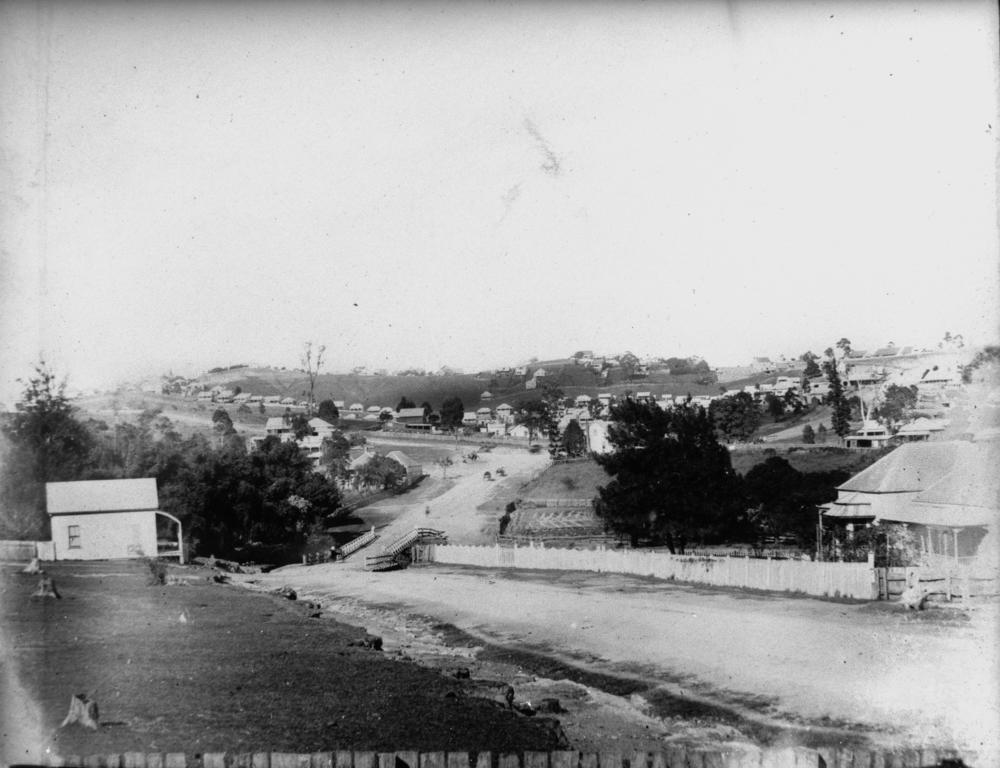
Kelvin Grove Road c.1890

The fig trees along Kelvin Grove Road at the Normanby Fiveways, Marshall Park and Prospect Terrace, were planted either during the late 19th or early 20th centuries. It is possible that some may be associated with the work of Ithaca Divisional Board and Ithaca Shire Councillor Silvanus White, who reputedly planted many trees in the Ithaca district in the late 19th century. However, they are more likely to be associated with the Ithaca Town Council's extensive programme of town improvement and beautification in the early 20th century.

During the 1850s a track passing through Kelvin Grove northwards to Newmarket, Enoggera and Cash's Crossing was known as the Northern Road, and remained the major route northwards from Brisbane until Bowen Bridge was constructed in the early 1860s. By 1881 the "track" was known as the Kelvin Grove Road.

On survey plans of the 1860s, the Kelvin Grove area was marked as the "Three Mile Scrub". In February 1865 forty portions of one to two acres were surveyed between Kelvin Grove and Waterworks Roads, stretching from the Normanby Fiveways to Enoggera Creek. By the end of August that year some of these portions along Kelvin Grove Road had been subdivided into residential allotments ranging in size from twenty to thirty perches, up to a half acre or so. Local subdivision into small housing lots continued for decades, resulting in an early 20th century townscape denuded of vegetation.

By 1881 the urban population within suburbs such as Kelvin Grove had grown so much that Queensland's Registrar-General was referring to the city centre and its surrounding suburbs as the metropolitan city of Brisbane. Despite this population growth, the Municipality of Brisbane had annexed no suburban land. Nor had any of the suburban communities surrounding the city centre sought incorporation under Queensland's existing municipal provisions. Therefore, the Queensland Government imposed local government, creating during late 1879 and early 1880 a number of Divisions ringing the city centre.

Ithaca Division, which included the districts of Windsor and Enoggera as well as Kelvin Grove, Red Hill, Paddington and Milton, was created in November 1879, Kelvin Grove Road forming the eastern boundary with Booroodabin Division. In September 1887 Ithaca Division was subdivided into Ithaca, Windsor and Enoggera Shires, with Kelvin Grove remaining within Ithaca Shire.

During the second half of the 1880s a more crowded urban core and a developing public transport system encouraged land subdivision and suburban expansion in Brisbane, including northwest to Kelvin Grove. By 1888 the Normanby Fiveways had become a busy centre. Tramlines were laid along Kelvin Grove Road during 1897 to 1901, and by the end of 1903 the tram service extended along Kelvin Grove as far as the corner of Edmonstone Road, handy to the Newmarket Hotel.

Ithaca Shire was proclaimed a town in 1902. For virtually its entire existence, Ithaca Town Council pursued a policy of creating a distinctive and aesthetically pleasing environment, and of providing civic amenities such as parks and playgrounds. The council's street beautification strategy is probably best known for the creation of Ithaca embankment gardens during the 1910s and 1920s, some of which remain along thoroughfares such as Musgrave and Windsor Roads. However, the planting of street trees by the council, community organisations and individual residents also featured in many annual Mayoral reports.

Ithaca Town Council minutes for December 1908 referred to suggestions from trustees of the sports ground now known as EE McCaskie Park, on the eastern side of Kelvin Grove Road, for the planting of trees. In July 1909 the minutes recorded an offer by the proprietor of the Normanby Hotel to contribute £10 towards tree planting at the Normanby Fiveways. The fig trees on Kelvin Grove Road at the Normanby appear to have been planted around this time, judging from subsequent Mayoral reports.

Reporting for 1909, Ithaca Mayor George Hall outlined how Shade trees have been planted at the Normanby, along the Kelvin Grove Road ... Alterations were made to a number of tree guards to prevent the continual destruction of young growing trees. The cost of planting and protecting the trees at the Normanby is shared by the ratepayer whose property they will most improve. The Mayor did not specify whether the damage was wreaked by people, horses, vehicles, or the plentiful goats.

The widened road reserve now known as Marshall Park existed by 1893. Named for local Alderman H. Marshall and formerly known as the Kelvin Grove Playground, Marshall Park has long been used for children's recreation, although not officially reserved as a park and named, until 1978. An unsourced newspaper clipping held by John Oxley Library, dated 9 September 1922, includes a photograph which seems to show the fig trees in Marshall Park. A line of eight trees is already well-grown, reaching a height approximately three times that of a passing vehicle. Brisbane City Council plans for McCaskie Oval drawn in 1949 represent nine trees along the western side of Kelvin Grove Road. Photographs taken in 1958 confirm their large size by the middle of the 20th century.

The Prospect Terrace triangular section of road reserve was marked on the 1901 Musgrave Road Tramway Estate map. At the instigation of the Brisbane City Council efforts were made c. 1996 to close the road reserve at the corner of Prospect Terrace and declare it a reserve for park purposes, but negotiations have not been concluded.

The urban improvement works carried out by Ithaca Town Council extended over two decades. They included the planting of street trees by the Council itself, sealing of roads and improvements to footpaths and drainage. More mundane works such as forming and metalling, laying concrete kerbing and channelling, and footpath widening along Kelvin Grove Road were carried out over a number of years. The road featured in the surviving Mayoral reports for 1917, 1918 and 1921. The report of 1917 had commented that Kelvin Grove Road was very rough in places. By 1921 Mayor John Tait could report that Kelvin Grove Road had been metalled to the Town boundary.

During the decade after the planting of the Normanby trees, Council continued to report the encouragement, and practical assistance, given to individuals and community organisations wanting to plant more street trees. In 1917 the Milton and Rosalie Improvement Association had submitted a request to Council for the planting of avenues of trees along Baroona Road and Nash Street. During 1921, the Town Council reported planting 147 trees. Furthermore, Tait reported that the residents are taking much more interest in the beautification of the Town, and already we have two streets in which trees are to be planted by the residents themselves. And for 1923, Tait reported that the many small reserves and little gardens about the Town are looking well and do credit to our gardener, Mr Jolly. During 1924 the community planted trees along Mary, Moreton and Castlemaine Streets.

On the basis of the interest taken by the former Ithaca Town Council in landscaping and town beautification projects during the period 1902–1925, and available photographic evidence, it seems most likely that the fig trees which survive along Kelvin Grove Road between the Normanby Fiveways and Prospect Terrace, were planted during this period.

The Brisbane City Council built the concrete shelter at Kelvin Grove as an air raid shelter in 1942. On 7 December 1941, the United States of America entered World War II following the bombing of the American fleet at Pearl Harbor in Hawaii by Japanese carrier-borne aircraft. England and its Commonwealth had been at war with Germany since September 1939, but now the war was truly global. The Japanese first bombed Darwin on 19 February 1942 and 14,000 Australians were taken prisoner following the fall of Singapore. Plans to defend Australia from an anticipated Japanese invasion and to use Queensland as a support base for the conduct of the Pacific war were implemented quickly. Australian and American personnel poured into Queensland and urgently required a wide range of new buildings and facilities.

The Brisbane City Council took responsibility for Air Raid Precautions activities, including establishing an Air Raid Warden system, firefighting systems and constructing air raid shelters. Aboveground salt water pipes were laid along city streets to aid in firefighting. On Christmas Eve, 1941, each Australian State's Emergency Committee issued instructions for government, private employers and private households to immediately start building shelters. Slit trenches were built in parks and schoolyards, windows were taped, and brownouts were applied to buildings.

In the Protection of Persons and Property Order No.1, gazetted 23 December 1941, Premier William Forgan Smith, with powers conferred by Regulation 35a, National Security (General) Regulations, ordered the Brisbane City Council to construct 200 public surface shelters in the city area. Work had already started on 15 December, and later another 75 shelters were ordered. However, only 235 air raid shelters were constructed, the building programme being 90% complete by June 1942. In addition, around three kilometres of covered trenches were constructed in public parks, in 13 projects, including 315 metres (1,033 ft) of concrete-pipe covered trench in the City Botanic Gardens, and 150 metres (490 ft) of the same in Victoria Park. It was believed that one person could be accommodated by each foot of trench. In addition to the public shelters, the Brisbane City Council also constructed shelters for leased wharves and council properties, including at the Stanley Wharf, Circular Quay Wharves 2,3 and 4, Norman Wharf, and Musgrave Wharf. Shelters were built under the Story Bridge, for Kangaroo Point shipbuilding workers, and five shelters were constructed on behalf of the Bureau of Industry at the Howard Smith Wharves.

The Protection of Persons and Property Order No.1 was applied statewide, and outside Brisbane another 24 Local Authorities in Queensland's coastal areas were ordered to produce surface or trench shelters for the public, to be built according to the Air Raid Shelter Code laid down in the Second Schedule of Order No.1. Initially, 20 of the Local Authorities were expected to construct a minimum total of 133 surface shelters, which were supposed to be able to withstand the blast of a 500-pound bomb bursting 50 feet (15 m) away. Four other Local Authorities would only build trenches. However, after plans were amended, 23 Local Authorities outside Brisbane, excluding Thursday Island, ended up possessing a total of 129 public shelters: 123 surface and six underground. This effort had cost £56,596. Where Local Authorities were unwilling or unable to build the required number of code-compliant shelters, in some cases because they had already begun erecting other shelters, the Department of Public Works became responsible for the shelters' construction. However, this led to problems when the department tried to recoup half of the cost from the Local Authorities in question. Townsville, Toowoomba, Gladstone, and Ayr denied any liability for costs, and a Bill had to be passed in December 1942 to force their compliance. The Ayr Shire Council had claimed that the shelters would be death traps during an air raid.

Of the 235 surface shelters built in Brisbane for the public, 21 survive and are still owned by the Brisbane City Council. One of the shelters, on Queens Wharf Road, is a site-specific "special" variation of the standard pillbox design. It is listed in the Queensland Heritage Register as part of the entry for the porphyry retaining wall on William Street. The other 20 public shelters owned by the Brisbane City Council can be divided into three types of pillbox intended for conversion after the war: "park", "bus", and "bus (stone)". They were designed to serve as structures such as bus waiting shelters or shade structures for parks, with some or all of the perimeter blast walls to be removed, leaving the concrete slab roof, floor slab and piers. The reusable pillboxes were designed to hold 70 people, as were the non-reusable standard pillboxes.

Frank Gibson Costello, Brisbane City Council City Architect between 1941 and 1952, was responsible for the design of the surface air raid shelters, and his variants of the standard pillbox were designed to provide a post-war utility for at least part of the council's shelter building programme. In an address delivered to the Constitutional Club in Brisbane in February 1942, Costello noted that "if the emergency for their use does not arise ...(unused shelters)... remain in brick and concrete, in many cases having no further value and being a possible source of nuisance. He added that I can assure you that wherever it is possible, without sacrificing the primary requirements of shelter from air attack, I have endeavoured in our Council buildings to so plan the shelters that they will fit into schemes of improvement which we hope will proceed immediately after the war". Costello's work was characterised by the use of an architectural language inspired by the modern movement in architecture. This movement pursued the rational use of modern materials and principles of functionalist planning and established a visual aesthetic largely inspired by the machine. It was part of an architecture employing the language of vertical and horizontal volumes and planes, floating flat roofs, masses set against voids and monumentality. Though modest in scale and form, the design of the shelters is characteristic of work in this idiom. The reusable shelters were often sited under fig trees, to aid in camouflage.

The first of Costello's reusable designs is the pillbox with double- cantilevered roof slab, or "park" type shelter. In an original list of all the shelters constructed by the Brisbane City Council, these were simply labelled as "cantilever". They had four central piers supporting the roof slab, which allowed for the removal of the four blast walls after the war. There was an entrance at each end of the front wall, where an internal wall extended into the shelter. If the walls were made of brick, the shelter's dimension was 40 feet 9 inches (12.42 m) by 13 feet 3 inches (4.04 m) by 8 feet 6 inches (2.59 m) high, and if concrete was used the dimensions were 40 feet (12 m) by 12 feet 6 inches (3.81 m) by 8 feet 6 inches (2.59 m) high. The difference was due to the fact that the brick walls finished in line with the top of the roof slab, covering the fascia, whereas the concrete walls finished at the soffit of the roof slab, flush with the fascia. The minimum wall thickness for brick was set at 13.5 inches (340 mm), and 12 inches (300 mm) for concrete. The roof slab was intended to have at least 4 inches (100 mm) of concrete.

Of the 37 reusable shelters listed as being of the park type only 17 survive: one at Hefferan Park in Annerley; two at Albert Park; two at Wickham Park; one in Buranda Playground in Woolloongabba; two in Raymond Park in Kangaroo Point; and one each at Kelvin Grove, Morningside, Nundah, Stones Corner, and Windsor. Four other shelters stand on East Street and Wickham Street in Fortitude Valley. Most are used as simple park shelters, as intended, but the shelter at Nundah has been modified as a toilet block, and the shelter at Kelvin Grove is used as a bus shelter (as distinct from those shelters in the next category, which were specifically designed as "bus" type shelters). About half of the surviving park shelters had concrete blast walls, while half used brick.

The second design was the pillbox with single-cantilevered roof slab, or "bus" type shelter, as it was called in the original Brisbane City Council list. These were designed so that the three brick blast walls could be removed after the war, leaving a concrete back wall and five brick piers at the front. Again, entrances were at each end of the front wall. Of the 19 "bus" types listed only two survive, at Newmarket and Newstead.

The third design was also a "bus" type shelter, but it was built with a stone rear wall, instead of concrete, and six stone piers were later added, instead of five brick piers. The three brick blast walls could be removed as normal. Two of these "colonnade" types were built- referred to in the Brisbane City Council list as "bus (stone)"- and only one survives, at King Edward Park.

Most of the Brisbane structures built for the war were removed at the end of World War II. The saltwater mains, slit trenches, and sirens disappeared, as did the many standard pillboxes that had stood in the middle of the streets of the Central Business District. 156 standard pillboxes were built, but none of the surviving public shelters in Brisbane City Council ownership are of that design. Of the 21 special shelters, only the one on Queens Wharf Road survives. However, of Costello's 58 reusable public surface shelters, 20 have survived; the removal of their blast walls, as planned, had given them a renewed purpose. The worker's shelters at the Story Bridge Hotel and Howard Smith Wharves also still exist.

The blast walls of the air raid shelter at Kelvin Grove were removed according to plan after World War II, although evidence of the location of the walls is still visible. The shelter piers have been painted and seating has been introduced.

== Description ==
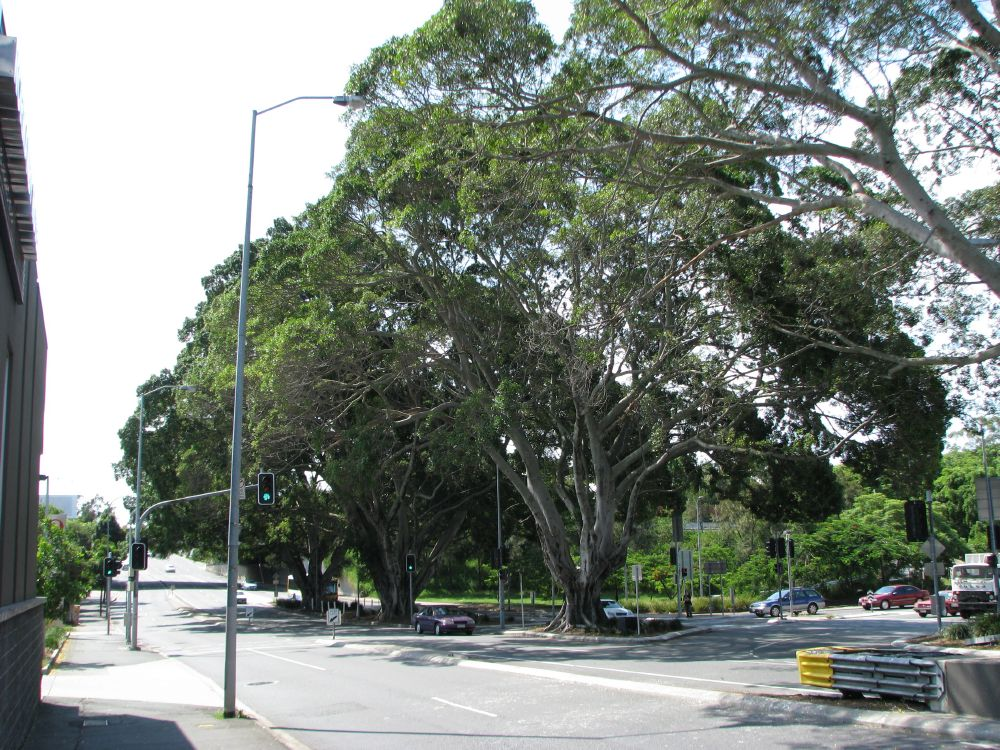
Row of fig trees, 2009

The Fig Trees are growing in three separate but linked locations within a length of one kilometre along Kelvin Grove Road, from the Normanby Fiveways to Prospect Terrace. They create an important sense of approach to the Brisbane central business district along Kelvin Grove, which is one of the city's major arterial roads.

The Normanby grouping comprises five mature weeping figs (Ficus benjamina) on a median strip between the inward and outbound lanes of Kelvin Grove Road. Despite road widening and the new fly-over Inner City Bypass, the trees still dominate the local streetscape. A turning lane divides the group into two sections comprising two trees nearest the Normanby and another three to the north.

At Marshall Park - a narrow island of parkland along the western side of Kelvin Grove Road, north of the Victoria Street intersection - seven Hill's fig trees (Ficus microcarpa var. hillii) line the eastern side of the reserve bordering Kelvin Grove Road. Prior to 1978, when the reserve was proclaimed, the trees on part of the Kelvin Grove Road reserve. Beneath these figs are grassed areas with playground equipment. The trees provide a barrier between the busy road and the residences to the west, as well as greatly enhancing the character and visual amenity of this area.

The Prospect Terrace grouping comprises three weeping figs (Ficus benjamina) on the road reserve at the corner of Prospect Terrace and Kelvin Grove Road. This triangular plot also hosts several other species including palms, and the air raid shelter, now used as a bus shelter.

The shelter is a rectangular concrete structure comprising a heavy floor slab and a flat roof supported by four concrete piers. A fig tree branch has grown down onto, and then along, the top of the roof slab. It accommodates two free-standing seats, bolted to the floor, in each end bay. Paving abuts the floor slab to the south and west.

== Heritage listing ==
Kelvin Grove Fig Trees and Air Raid Shelter was listed on the Queensland Heritage Register on 31 May 2005 having satisfied the following criteria.

The place is important in demonstrating the evolution or pattern of Queensland's history.

The fig trees are important in demonstrating the pattern of Queensland history, specifically several decades of continuing commitment by the Ithaca Town Council to municipal development, urban improvement and beautification, and the encouragement offered by the council to local residents for the greening of Ithaca which had been denuded during five decades of intensive subdivision and building. The Kelvin Grove air raid shelter is important as a part of the Air Raid Precaution activities that were implemented for the defence of Brisbane during World War II. Designed to afford protection to the civilian population of Brisbane in the event of air raid attacks or other emergencies, the air raid shelter located at the corner of Kelvin Grove Road and Prospect Terrace is important in demonstrating the impact of World War II on the civilian population of Brisbane.

The place demonstrates rare, uncommon or endangered aspects of Queensland's cultural heritage.

Although many air raid shelters were constructed during World War II in Queensland, comparatively few survive. Also, there are not many types of structures built by the Brisbane City Council during World War II, for wartime purposes, which survive.

The place is important in demonstrating the principal characteristics of a particular class of cultural places.

The shelter's solid construction, rectangular shape, and its siting near a population concentration, demonstrate the principal characteristics of a World War II Brisbane public air raid shelter.

The air raid shelter is important as an example of the wartime work of the City Architect's Office and particularly the work of City Architect F.G. Costello.

The place is important because of its aesthetic significance.

The trees are important because of their aesthetic significance. Lining a major arterial road, these large and mature fig trees are significant as defining one of the gateways to the centre of Brisbane. Despite recent major road construction, the fig trees still dominate the streetscape in their respective locations, providing welcome shade with a distinctly subtropical atmosphere.

The place is important in demonstrating a high degree of creative or technical achievement at a particular period.

The Kelvin Grove air raid shelter, now used as a bus shelter, demonstrates the secondary uses that were part of the original design intention. The shelter is a durable example of innovative design and use of concrete technology during World War II.

The place has a strong or special association with a particular community or cultural group for social, cultural or spiritual reasons.

The trees are valued by the modern community for their streetscape value, as was demonstrated by extensive community protest in 1996 when the Brisbane City Council proposed cutting down two adjacent fig trees for street widening.
