= Kelvin Grove, Queensland =

Kelvin Grove
- Suburb
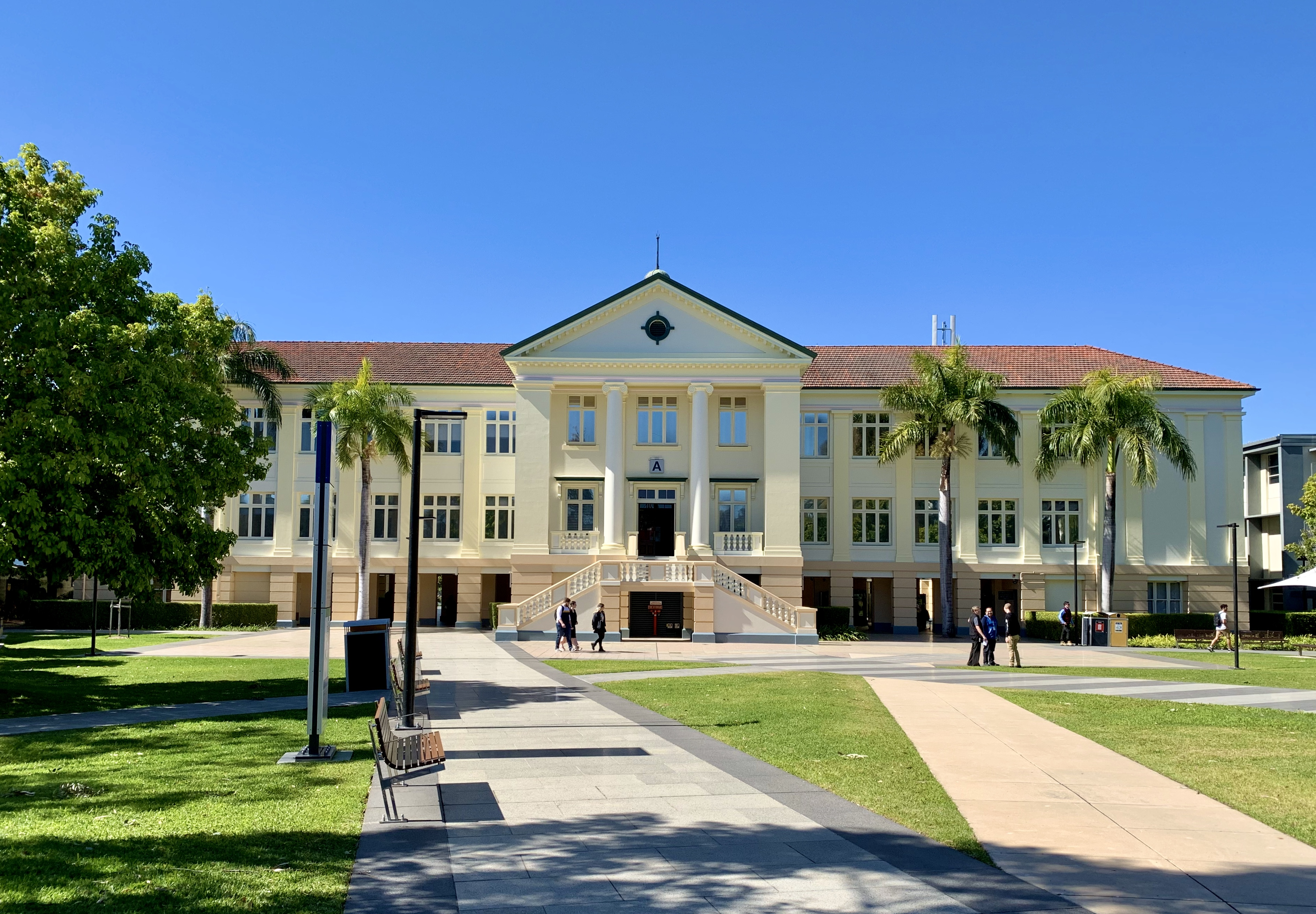
- Queensland University of Technology (QUT), Kelvin Grove

- Interactive map of Kelvin Grove
- Coordinates: 27.4516°S 153.0102°E
- Country: Australia
- State: Queensland
- City: Brisbane
- LGA: City of Brisbane (Paddington Ward & Central Ward)
- Location: 3.6 km (2.2 mi) NW of Brisbane CBD

Government
  - State electorates: McConnel; Cooper
  - Federal division: Brisbane

Area
  - Total: 1.7 km^{2} (0.66 sq mi)
- Elevation: 62 m (203 ft)

Population
  - Total: 7,909 (2021 census)
  - Density: 4,650/km^{2} (12,000/sq mi)
- Time zone: UTC+10:00 (AEST)
- Postcode: 4059
Suburbs around Kelvin Grove
Newmarket	Newmarket	Wilston
Red Hill	Kelvin Grove	Herston
Red Hill	Petrie Terrace; Brisbane City	Spring Hill

Kelvin Grove is an inner northern suburb in the City of Brisbane, Queensland, Australia. In the 2021 census, Kelvin Grove had a population of 7,909 people.

== Geography ==
Kelvin Grove is approximately 3 kilometres (1.9 mi) from the Brisbane central business district.

It is primarily residential with tree-lined streets and some commercial and light industrial activities along its main thoroughfare, Kelvin Grove Road. La Boite Theatre Company, Queensland's second largest theatre company, operates from the Roundhouse Theatre on the Kelvin Grove campus of the Queensland University of Technology.

In common with many inner suburbs of Brisbane, the suburb has a mixture of traditional "Queenslander" homes, some post-war worker's cottages and more modern apartment blocks.

== History ==
Kevin Grove was part of what was known as the Three Mile Scrub. A ford was located on Enoggera Creek on the northern boundary of the suburb.

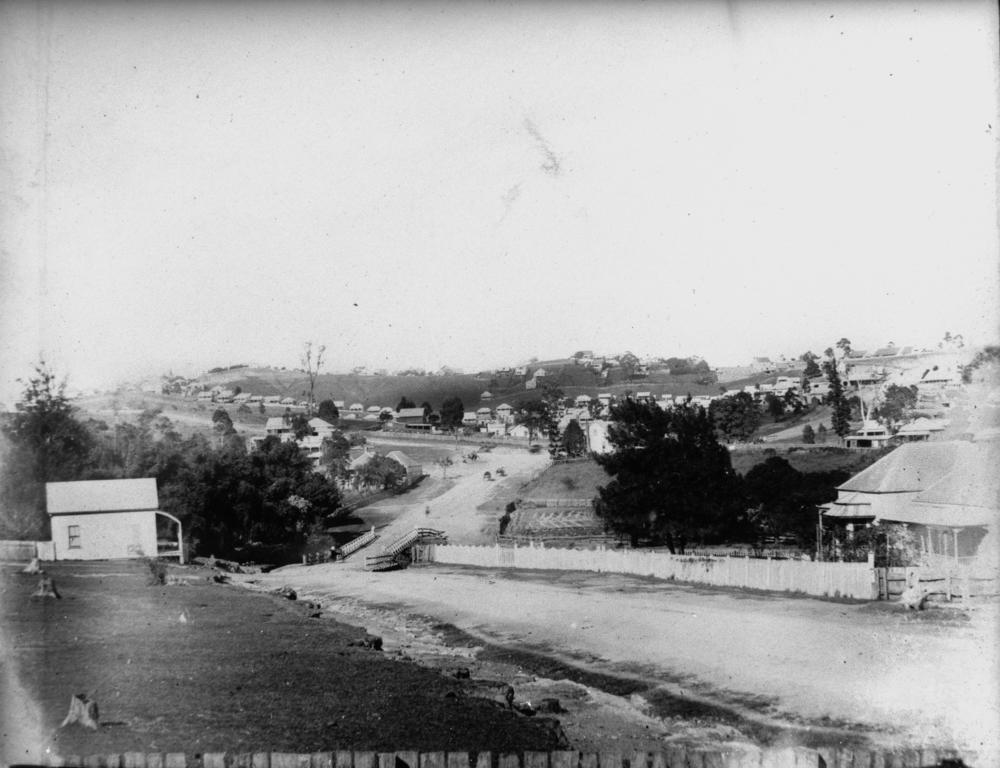
Kelvin Grove Road c. 1890

Dr Joseph Bancroft built a residence in the area in 1865 which he called Kelvin Grove after Kelvingrove Park in Glasgow that he remembered fondly. This is the origin of the suburb's name.

Kelvin Grove Road State School opened in 1875. In 1887, it was split into Kelvin Grove Boys State School and Kelvin Grove Girls and Infants State School. On 31 January 1950, there was a merger creating Kelvin Grove State School for the older boys and girls and Kelvin Grove Infants State School for the younger boys and girls. In 1961 the Infants School was absorbed back into Kelvin Grove State School. Kelvin Grove State School was on the block surrounded by School Street, Tank Street, Victoria Park Road, and L'Estrange Terrace (27.4505°S 153.0116°E), while the girls school and the infants school were on an "extension" triangular site on the eastern corner of L'Estrange Terrace and Victoria Park Road (27.4496°S 153.0128°E), later part of the Kelvin Grove State High School. In January 2002, Kelvin Grove State School and Kelvin Grove State High School merged to become Kelvin Grove State College.

Kelvin Grove was part of the Shire of Ithaca (later the Town of Ithaca) before the town was amalgamated into the City of Greater Brisbane in 1925.

In 1901 electric trams commenced operations along Kelvin Grove Road, running to the city. The tram service ceased in December 1968 and since that time diesel and more recently compressed natural gas buses operated by the Brisbane City Council have served the suburb. Electric trolley-buses, also operated by the Brisbane City Council connected the suburb with Fortitude Valley, via Herston between 1953 and 1969.

In August 1914, 46 subdivided allotments of "Bancroft Park Estate" were advertised to be auctioned by Isles Love & Co. A map advertising the auction states the estate was fronting the Kelvin Grove tram line and easy walking distance of town. This property was situated at the Three Mile Bridge, on the Kelvin Grove tram line and was well known as the former residence of the late Dr Bancroft.

Kelvin Grove State High School opened on 23 January 1961. Kelvin Grove State High School was on the eastern corner of L'Estrange Terrace and Victoria Park Road (27.4496°S 153.0129°E) across the Victoria Park Road from Kelvin Grove State School. In January 2002, Kelvin Grove State School and Kelvin Grove State High School merged to become Kelvin Grove State College. Kelvin Grove State High School's website was archived. The section of Victoria Park Road between the two former schools was closed to create a single site and Tank Street was renamed to become part of Victoria Park Road.

The 1976 Spring Hill shooting came to a conclusion near Victoria Park Road and Rochester Terrace where multiple hostages were rescued and murderer William Robert Wilson was taken into custody.

Following the closure of the Gona Barracks in 1998, the 7 hectares (17 acres) site was used as the basis of an urban renewal program resulting in the Kelvin Grove Urban Village which integrates the Kelvin Grove campus of Queensland University of Technology with residential and commercial buildings. The Kelvin Grove Urban Village was officially opened by Queensland Premier Peter Beattie on 24 November 2003.

Queensland Academy for Creative Industries opened in 2007.

== Demographics ==
In the 2011 census, Kelvin Grove had a population of 6,018 people, 52% female and 48% male. The median age of the Kelvin Grove population was 27 years of age, 10 years below the Australian median. 60.8% of people living in Kelvin Grove were born in Australia, compared to the national average of 69.8%; the next most common countries of birth were China 3.6%, Saudi Arabia 3.4%, England 2.9%, India 2.4%, New Zealand 2.3%. 69.4% of people spoke only English at home; the next most common languages were 4.6% Arabic, 3.7% Mandarin, 1.7% Cantonese, 1.5% Malay, 1.1% Korean.

In the 2016 census, Kelvin Grove had a population of 7,927 people.

In the 2021 census, Kelvin Grove had a population of 7,909 people.

== Heritage listings ==
Kelvin Grove has a number of heritage-listed sites, including:

- Ithaca Embankments, Kelvin Grove, Red Hill, Paddington
- Gona Barracks, 3, 7, 12, 25 & 26 Gona Parade
- Student residences, 95–107 Musk Avenue
- Kelvin Grove Fig Trees and Air Raid Shelter, 104A Kelvin Grove Road
- Kelvin Grove State College buildings, L'Estrange Terrace (27.4496°S 153.0128°E)
- AMA House, 188 L'Estrange Terrace

== Education ==
Kelvin Grove State College is a government primary and secondary (Prep–12) school for boys and girls at L'Estrange Terrace (27.4497°S 153.0118°E). In 2017, the school had an enrolment of 2,862 students with 218 teachers (194 full-time equivalent) and 81 non-teaching staff (58 full-time equivalent). It includes a special education program.

Queensland Academy for Creative Industries is a government secondary (10–12) school for boys and girls at 61 Musk Avenue (27.4528°S 153.0143°E). In 2017, the school had an enrolment of 295 students with 40 teachers (34 full-time equivalent) and 22 non-teaching staff (13 full-time equivalent).

The suburb is also home to the Kelvin Grove Campus of the Queensland University of Technology.

== Amenities ==
La Boite Theatre Company performs at the Queensland University of Technology's Roundhouse Theatre in Musk Avenue (27.4553°S 153.0135°E).

== Events ==
Kelvin Grove parkrun takes place every Saturday at 7 am on Enoggera Creek Bikeway starting 100 metres from the End of Bishop Road.
