= Kelvin Grove State College =

- Brisbane, Queensland; Australia

Information
- Type: Public
- Motto: With All Thy Might / The Pursuit of Excellence with All Our Might
- Established: 2002
- Principal: John Thornberry
- Enrolment: ~3700 (2026)
- Campus: Metropolitan
- Colours: Red, white and green
- Website: kelvingrovesc.eq.edu.au

Kelvin Grove State College is a government primary secondary school in Kelvin Grove, Brisbane, Queensland, Australia, three kilometres from Brisbane’s central business district and adjacent the Kelvin Grove campus of Queensland University of Technology (QUT). Some of the school's buildings are listed on the Queensland Heritage Register.

== History ==
Kelvin Grove State College was formed in 2002 with the amalgamation of Kelvin Grove State High School and Kelvin Grove State School. It is one of the largest government educational institutions in Australia.

The amalgamation was an initiative of the Government of Queensland's Smart State initiative. The name was voted upon by students, staff and administration in 2001 from a selection of choices. Thus, the school became a P–12 (prep to year twelve) school for state enrolments. The amalgamation also created 3 sub schools; 'The Junior School' catering for grades prep to 5, 'The Middle School' catering for grades 6 to 9 and 'The Senior School' catering for grades 10 to 12.

== Notable alumni ==
- Viraat Badhwar – golfer
- Lori Cramer – rugby union player
- Michael Falzon – actor
- Kate Jones – Minister for Education of Queensland
- Piers Lane - concert pianist and performer
- Kate Miller-Heidke – singer, songwriter and actress
- Bob McMaster – wrestler and rugby union/league player
- Scared Weird Little Guys – Rusty Berther – musician, comedian
- Andrew Stockdale – lead singer of the band Wolfmother
- Larissa Waters – Australian Greens Leader
- Quan Yeomans – lead singer of the band Regurgitator
- Dennis Young - Australian politician and health advocate at Drug Arm

== Notable staff ==
- Benjamin Bell
- Ralph Hultgren
