= Roundhouse Theatre =

Theatre-in-the-round in Brisbane, Queensland, Australia

Coordinates: 27.4552°S 153.0135°E

The Roundhouse Theatre is a theatre-in-the-round located in the Kelvin Grove Urban Village, Brisbane, Queensland, Australia. It is Australia's only purpose-built theatre in the round. The building is owned by Queensland University of Technology and used by the La Boite Theatre Company.

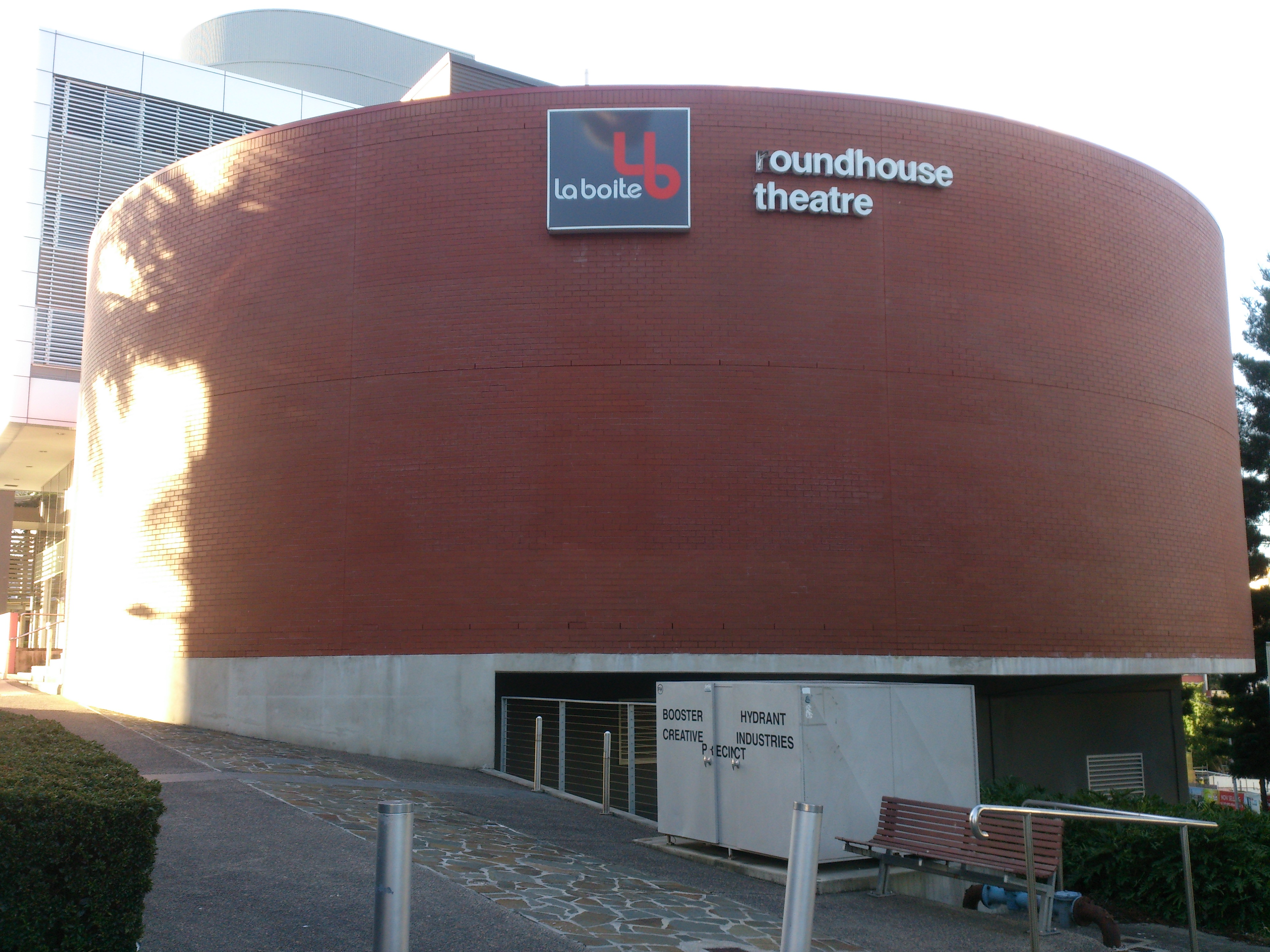
Exterior 2015

== History ==
The La Boite Theatre Building was Australia's first purpose-built theatre-in-the-round, constructed for the Brisbane Repertory Theatre which then renamed itself La Boite Theatre Company. The La Boite Theatre Building could seat 200 at its fullest configuration. The La Boite Theatre Building was deemed to be of such significant cultural and architectural significance that it was listed on the Queensland Heritage Register in 2004. However, it struggled to be commercially viable and was eventually redeveloped as commercial offices.

In 1998 the Australian Army decided it no longer required its heritage-listed Gona Barracks and wished to sell the land. This led to a partnership being formed between the Queensland Department of Housing, the Brisbane City Council and the Queensland University of Technology to redevelop the site as the Kelvin Grove Urban Village as a mixed use precinct combining educational, residential and retail use of the site. The urban village had a strong arts and entertainment theme as the university was placing its Creative Industries Faculty in the village. This was complemented by the Queensland Academy for Creative Industries, a selective public senior high school for students wishing to specialise in the arts and entertainment.

The university constructed the Roundhouse Theatre in 2004 to meet its needs for a theatre for training students in the performing arts, but wanted the theatre to be used commercially as well to generate income and to be consistent with the philosophy of the urban village of integrating the university with the community. By constructing the university's theatre as a theatre-in-the-round, it enabled the La Boite Theatre Company to sell the La Boite Theatre Building and lease the Roundhouse Theatre instead, a commercially viable arrangement for both the theatre company and the university.

== Facilities ==
The Roundhouse Theatre can seat 400 people for central staging (audience on four sides) or 336 people for thrust stage (audience on three sides). The La Boite Theatre Company (Queensland's 2nd largest theatre company) perform at the Roundhouse Theatre.

Queensland University of Technology also own the QUT Gardens Theatre on their Gardens Point campus. That theatre was originally built for the Queensland Conservatorium of Music.
