= Gona Barracks =

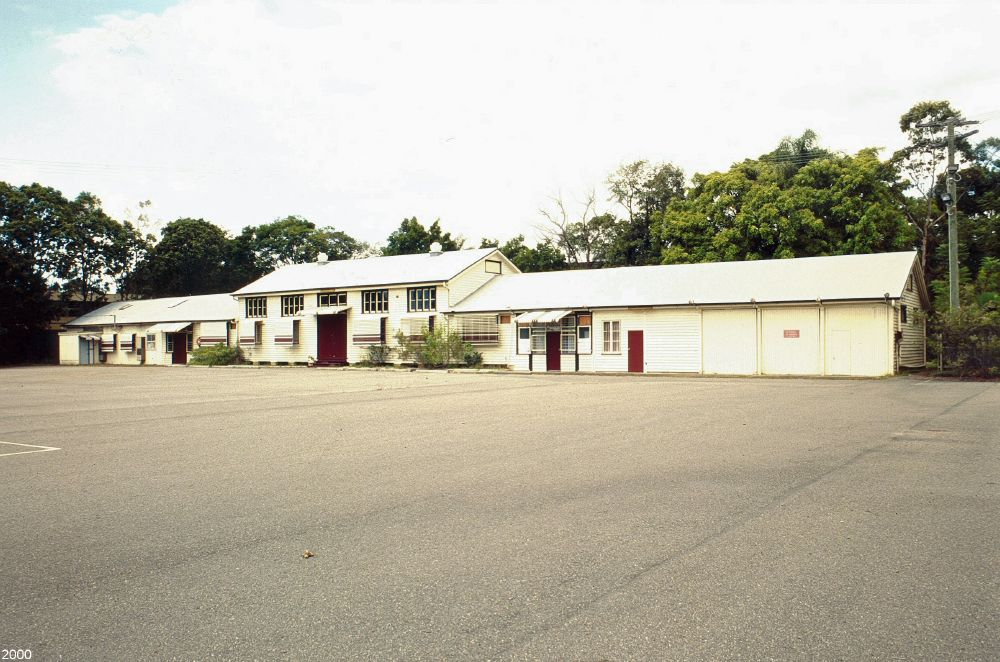
- Gona Barracks, 2003

- Location within Queensland Location within Australia
- 27.4558°S 153.0136°E
- Location: 3, 7, 12, 25 & 26 Gona Parade, Kelvin Grove, City of Brisbane, Queensland, Australia

History
- Design period: 1914–1919 (World War I)
- Built: c. 1914–1960s

Queensland Heritage Register
- Official name: Gona Barracks, Kelvin Grove Military Reserve, Kelvin Grove Training Area
- Type: state heritage (built)
- Designated: 7 February 2005
- Reference no.: 601966
- Significant period: 1910s–1960s (fabric); 1910s–1990s (historical)
- Significant components: drill ground/parade ground, workshop, slab/s – concrete, hut/shack, shed – gun park, petrol – bowser, trees/plantings, store/s / storeroom / storehouse, tree groups – avenue of, garage, road/roadway, hall – drill, toilet block/earth closet/water closet

Gona Barracks is a heritage-listed barracks at 3, 7, 12, 25 & 26 Gona Parade, Kelvin Grove, City of Brisbane, Queensland, Australia. It was built from c. 1914 to 1960s. It is also known as Kelvin Grove Military Reserve and Kelvin Grove Training Area. It was added to the Queensland Heritage Register on 7 February 2005.

== History ==
The Gona Barracks site was established just prior to World War I in the 1910s, for the purpose of military training for specialist units of compulsory militia forces. The site continued to develop and became a Citizens Military Force training complex in the 1950s, and later an Army Reserve recruitment centre.

The settlement of Brisbane began in 1825 with the establishment of a penal colony along that part of the Brisbane River that was later to become the town's central business district. Transportation of convicts ceased less than twenty years later in 1842, and Brisbane was opened to free settlement. The town was surveyed, and land to the north and west of Spring Hill, an area of early settlement, was made into park land. West of Victoria Park, the largest of the government reserves, the area now known as Kelvin Grove was cleared, and subdivided and offered for sale by the 1860s. The site that was eventually to become Gona Barracks was listed as Portion 322, Parish of North Brisbane, County of Stanley.

On 28 March 1879, Portion 322 was granted by the colonial government to the Brisbane Grammar School as an endowment. The school retained the endowment until 1911, leasing grazing rights to the holding as a means of raising funds for the school. No buildings were thought to have been constructed on the site throughout this period, and the only improvement to the endowment was the construction of a number of fences.

In May 1911, the Commonwealth Government acquired the Brisbane Grammar School endowment, and renamed the site the Kelvin Grove Defence Reserve. Acquisition of the property was a response to the need for training facilities for Australia's expanding military forces. Forces of a voluntary nature, supported by a small number of permanent forces, had been in place in most of the Australian colonies by the late nineteenth century. With the Federation of Australia's six colonies on 1 January 1901, defence became the responsibility of the new Commonwealth Government, and a Department of Defence was established in March 1901. The department took over control of the various colonial volunteer forces which, together with 1500 full-time soldiers, numbered almost 30,000. An external report completed in 1909 suggested the volunteer militia forces needed to be increased to number 80,000 soldiers and led to the establishment of the Army's Royal Military College at Duntroon in 1911. The Federal Government's response to the report was to introduce compulsory military training for both men and boys. The bulk of the Army's officers and troops were to serve on a part-time basis in the Australian Military Forces (AMF or militia), attending training one night per week and participating in some weekend camps and an annual encampment.

By 1911, some 90,000 men and boys had registered for military training Australia-wide, a number which expanded to over 130,000 two years later. Facilities for training in Brisbane included drill halls in Alice and Adelaide Street Streets in the city, and in Boundary Street in Spring Hill. The increase in numbers placed pressure on these facilities, none of which had room for expansion as each was located in a built-up area. The Department of Defence decided it would solve the problem by swapping the three inner Brisbane drill hall sites with the Queensland Government for more adequate land, specifying that the site be close to a tram line. The Survey Officer of Engineers, Captain Good, identified three possible sites to replace the inner city drill halls. The Grammar School Endowment was favoured in assessments of the sites, and in November 1910 the trustees of the endowment accepted an offer of £8000, and the deed of title for the "Kelvin Grove Defence Reserve" was transferred to the Commonwealth in May 1911.

=== Kelvin Grove Defence Reserve ===
The first buildings to be constructed on the Kelvin Grove Defence Reserve were an Infantry drill hall, consisting of a large drill space with eight offices along one side of the building, an associated toilet building, and an artificers workshop for Army mechanics, completed in 1914. This began an era of intense building activity at the site, precipitated by Australia's entry into World War I in August 1914. To enable the construction of further buildings, the site had to be made level, an activity costing over £3000. By October 1915, the levelling had been finished, and another building, the Engineer's depot, had been added to the site. This two-storey timber building was rectangular in shape, and was constructed to the design of Queensland Public Works Department architects. This building was completed at a cost of just over £1500 for the 23rd and 15th Engineer Companies, and included two wagon sheds and two harness rooms.

An Artillery drill hall, Brigade office and two gun parks for the Artillery units were the next additions to the site, constructed at the end of 1915. The Artillery drill hall was a rectangular, single-storey building with offices and wagon sheds at each end of a centrally located drill hall. The Brigade hall was a two-storey building, located to the west of the drill hall. The two gun park buildings were built at right angles to the Brigade hall, along the Kelvin Grove Road alignment. Each of the buildings featured a large room for the storage of 13-pounder artillery pieces, harness and cleaning rooms, and an office and commanding officer's room. These artillery buildings were designed by the Queensland branch of the Commonwealth Department of Home Affairs, and are among the earliest Commonwealth designs in Queensland. Most Commonwealth buildings at this time were being designed and constructed by the various state's public works departments as it was some time before the Commonwealth established its own department with its own employees.

A drill hall for the Australian Army Service Corps (AASC) was added at the same time the Artillery buildings were constructed. This hall was built near the 1914 drill hall, at the opposite end of the site from the Artillery drill hall. The single-storey timber building was constructed to the plans of Commonwealth Department of Home Affairs architects, whose drawings were more detailed copies of plans prepared by the Queensland Government. Some other ancillary buildings were added to the Kelvin Grove site by the end of World War I. These included a military laundry with an attached engine house, and a "disinfector" building.

The First World War came to an end on 11 November 1918, and Australian troops returned home. Despite a lack of interest in matters military among the Australian government and people, military training continued at Kelvin Grove throughout the 1920s. By 1921, the Kelvin Grove site had become the training centre for the AASC, Signallers, Engineers and Artillerymen. The reserve was also used by the 11th Mixed Brigade for large training exercises, to which the specialist units based at Kelvin Grove were attached. On one occasion in 1923, the Kelvin Grove Engineers, Artillery, Signals and AASC units, together with Infantry, Australian Light Horse and Australian Army Medical Corps from elsewhere, combined for a training exercise at the site.

The use of some of the Kelvin Grove Defence Reserve buildings changed during the 1920s. The AASC moved out of its drill hall, which thereafter became ordnance offices and stores, while one of the gun parks was converted to an ordnance store, and the 1914 drill hall was converted to an ordnance lecture room.

The interwar period from 1919 to 1939 was an era of gradual expansion on the Reserve site. The first building to be constructed after the war was a corrugated iron remount depot. This building was dismantled and re-erected in 1933, and together with two riding yards and a manure pit, became the riding school. Many of the subsequent buildings to appear on the site throughout the Depression years of the 1930s were structures relocated from other locations. In 1934, the Royal Australian Engineers (RAE) drill hall was relocated to Kelvin Grove from Toowong, at a cost of £1620. The hall was located on sloping land near the AASC drill hall at the southern end of the site. It was positioned on reinforced concrete stumps and converted into a two-storey building. A Belgian 5.9-inch (150 mm) gun, captured from the Germans at Pozières in France during World War I by the 9th Battalion, Royal Queensland Regiment, was mounted on the grass outside the building. Living quarters for an Army staff officer were also added in 1934. The three bedroom timber house was constructed along Sylvan Road by builders NT Stansfield and Thomas Foster at a quoted price of £1500. The following year, a Field Artillery officer's mess was constructed between the Artillery drill hall and brigade office, thereby converting the two separate buildings into a single structure.

The Frank Moran Memorial Hall was another building to be added to the Kelvin Grove site in the interwar period. Frank Moran was a cadet officer prior to World War I, involved the training of Brisbane Grammar School military cadets. When Australia entered the war, Moran enlisted in the 1st AIF and left Australia in November 1914. He fought at Gallipoli and died of wounds on board ship in August 1915. The Hall was one of three memorials erected in his memory, the others being a Memorial Cross at St Brigid's Catholic Church in Red Hill (dismantled in the 1930s); and a stained glass window in the Brisbane Grammar School War Memorial Library. Capital for the construction of the hall came from funds raised by Moran in 1913 and 1914, intended for the construction of a recreation building for cadets at Red Hill. Some £400 were raised, but lay forgotten until 1920. In 1925, the trustees of the fund decided to donate the money to the Army, provided the funds were used in a project that reflected the intentions of Moran more than ten years earlier. The following March, it was proposed the money be used for the construction of a recreation hut at Kelvin Grove which was to bear Moran's name. The Commonwealth Department of Works and Railways prepared plans for the Frank Moran Memorial Hall in 1928, and in November 1929 the hall was completed at a cost of £461. The simple timber building was sited between the AASC drill hall and the 1914 Infantry drill hall. Left-over funds were used to purchase furniture, and a bathroom extension was added in 1933. In 1937 ownership and control of the hall was signed over to the Defence Department.

Throughout the interwar period, the northern portion of the Kelvin Grove Defence Reserve, the "lower barracks", remained undeveloped by the Defence Department, who leased the land to private individuals for grazing purposes from the 1920s. The department resumed control of this area for the riding school in late 1934.

As the 1930s progressed, it became increasingly evident that another war was approaching. In February 1938 further additions were made to the site following a reorganisation of the existing buildings. The Engineers had moved from their 1915 depot building to the relocated Toowong drill hall, and the Army Signals Corps moved into the former Engineer's depot, renamed the Kelvin Grove Signals Corps depot. The southern side of the building was extended with a two-storey wing, positioned at right angles to the original structure. This area housed a drill space and various stores and messes. In May 1939, the original 1914 drill hall was also altered with the construction of a skillion-roofed extension to the north. A fire hut was relocated to the rear of this drill hall. The Queensland 61st (Infantry) Battalion occupied the building at this time. Finally, in May 1939, a new lavatory block featuring a female toilet was erected under the Signals Corps depot; a closet building behind the AASC building was converted into a cookhouse; and a wireless hut located to the north of the Signals Corps depot, and a combined social and lecture hall were added to the Reserve.

=== World War II ===
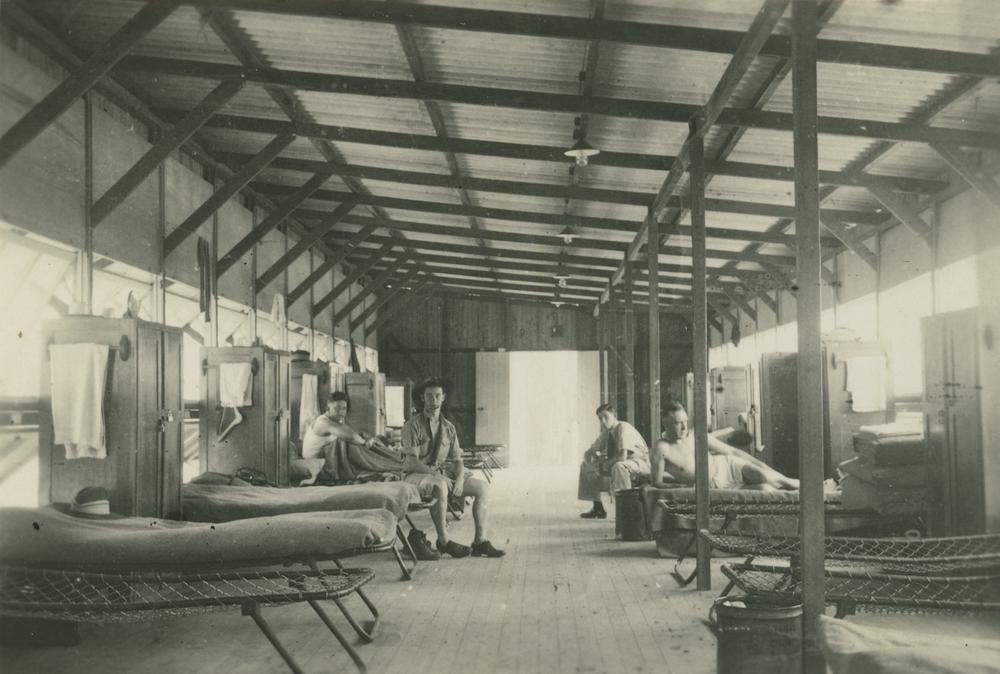
Army barracks at Kelvin Grove, Brisbane during WWII

Australia entered the Second World War on 3 September 1939 with a declaration of war on Germany. Within the month of September, the 5th Field Artillery Regiment; the 42nd and 43rd Artillery Batteries; the 105th and 111th Artillery Batteries; and the first motor transport for the Batteries' 18-pounder guns and 4.5-inch (110 mm) howitzers, had assembled at the site. The militia troops from the Signals Corps, the RAE and the AASC were also located at the Kelvin Grove Mobilisation Stores, and the 9/49th Signals Unit and the 61st Battalion were operating out of the 1914 infantry drill hall.

During World War II there were two permanent additions to the Kelvin Grove site. One was a garage and workshops building for servicing AASC vehicles, made necessary by the Army's process of converting from horse transport to motorised. Plans for the building were prepared in November 1939 and it is thought construction of the building was completed around 1942. The other permanent construction was the School for Linesmen-in-Training building, a two-storey, timber-framed and sheeted with fibrous cement building, finished by July 1941. The still undeveloped lower barracks area was the location of the building, constructed at a price of £2961 by Percy Richard Ayre. The building was constructed for the Postmaster-General's Department, who agreed to train militia forces at the facility.

Besides the permanent additions to the barracks site, a number of temporary structures were added to accommodate some of the troops mobilised for the war effort. By the end of the war in 1945, temporary and permanent buildings of various shapes and sizes had spread throughout the Military Reserve. An area of notable development occurred around the staff officers quarters at the lower barracks. Here, 27 buildings formed the 2nd Australian Commander Royal Engineers camp. The buildings were likely to have been standard prefabricated structures of the World War II period, consisting of timber and masonite with fibro sheeting. A sloping dirt road connected the upper and lower barracks areas at this time, as did a long line of steep steps.

The US Army were also involved with the Kelvin Grove site during World War II. The parade ground area at the upper barracks site was made level by the US Army, whose alterations created the sunken road that runs past the relocated Toowong drill hall.

=== Post-war years ===
The Second World War ended in August 1945, and in the months that followed, Kelvin Grove Military Reserve saw the demobilisation of returning soldiers, and the disposal of surplus stores. In 1947, 48 buildings consisting mainly of the RAE Maintenance Company and Signals Camps in the Lower Barracks area, were designated as surplus to Army requirements and sold.

The post-war era was also a period of major reshaping of the Australian Army. The defence force was no longer to consist of a small core of professional offices, supported by a part-time army. To this end, the Australian Regular Army was created in September 1947, in which it was planned to have 19,000 full-time soldiers. The Australian Military Forces (militia) were renamed the Citizens Military Forces (CMF) in 1948, and in 1951 the Commonwealth introduced the National Service Scheme which required all 18-year-old Australian males to register for six months compulsory full-time military training, followed by a period of part-time service. The Kelvin Grove site, which became known as the Kelvin Grove Training Area in 1948, was to be used in the National Service Scheme as a major CMF training centre in Brisbane.

In 1952 the Defence Department decided to construct a new CMF complex for the training of Engineers and Signals at the Kelvin Grove site. The complex required many buildings, some of which were new buildings constructed at the site, and others were relocated from elsewhere. In establishing the CMF facility, CMF Engineers dug the initial earthworks, and the old riding school was demolished. Twenty-one World War II era buildings were relocated to the lower barracks area from the Wacol Army Camp, and a weatherboard assembly hall was built for both the Engineers and Signals. The depots for both groups were completed in 1953 and the engineers buildings were painted blue and the Signals buildings painted brown to distinguish between the two Depot areas. Authorisation for sealing the road linking the upper and lower barracks areas was also given in 1953. During the 1950s the School for Linesmen Building became the headquarters of the 5th Cadet Battalion which controlled all the school cadet units located in Brisbane and surrounding districts. The 5th Cadet Battalion remained in the building throughout the 1960s.

Throughout the 1950s and 1960s, the upper barracks continued its links with the Artillery. A 6-inch (150 mm) gun, reported to be from HMAS Sydney, was located behind the 1915 Engineers depot. The gun was later removed, although the "H" frame steel base remained.

The boundary of the Kelvin Grove training area altered somewhat throughout the 1950s and into the early 1960s. In the lower barracks area, two acres were purchased from the Queensland Government in 1953, and in subsequent years, the Army exchanged some of its land for privately owned land to make the Barracks site more symmetrical and to accommodate the expansion of the Signals depot. A portion of a Queensland Government road reserve was also purchased at a cost of £1000 in 1961. While the lower barracks area was expanding in this period, the upper barracks area was reduced in size. The laundry site had been privately leased since the 1920s, and in 1954 the building and equipment was sold to the company, Bishops Laundry and Dry Cleaners, and thereby excised from the barracks site.

=== Gona Barracks ===
During the 1960s the Australian Army began renaming their barracks sites, drawing on prominent battles for the names. The Kelvin Grove site became "Gona Barracks", derived from the Battle of Gona, fought between Japanese and Australian troops on the north coast of Papua New Guinea between 16 November and 9 December 1942. The barracks continued to evolve and new military units moved to the site. In 1965 five brick houses were built along Blamey Street at a cost of £30,000 for use as married quarters. Two of the houses were later removed from Blamey Street, and the remaining three were excised from the barracks site. In 1966 the parade ground area was resealed in order to install two helicopter landing pads, while by the 1980s, a new steel demountable lecture room was constructed where the former riding school once stood. Another building, the 1934 staff officers quarters, was removed and relocated to Witton Barracks at Indooroopilly in 1974. In the 1970s portions of army land were acquired by the Main Roads Department for various road works adjoining the site, while another portion was sold and became part of the Kelvin Grove Campus of Queensland University of Technology.

In recent years, Army recruitment in south-east Queensland became centred at the Gona Barracks site. Over the years, the use of many buildings changed and alterations to the buildings were made, especially in the upper barracks area. The former Artillery drill hall, former Engineers depot and the former AASC drill hall have been particularly altered internally.

In October 1998, following a period of scaling down of activity at the site, Gona Barracks officially closed. Units based at the barracks were dispersed to other Army bases, the museum shifted to Enoggera and a war memorial flagpole sent out to the Royal Australian Regiment Memorial Walk and Contemplation Building at Enoggera.

=== Kelvin Grove Urban Village ===
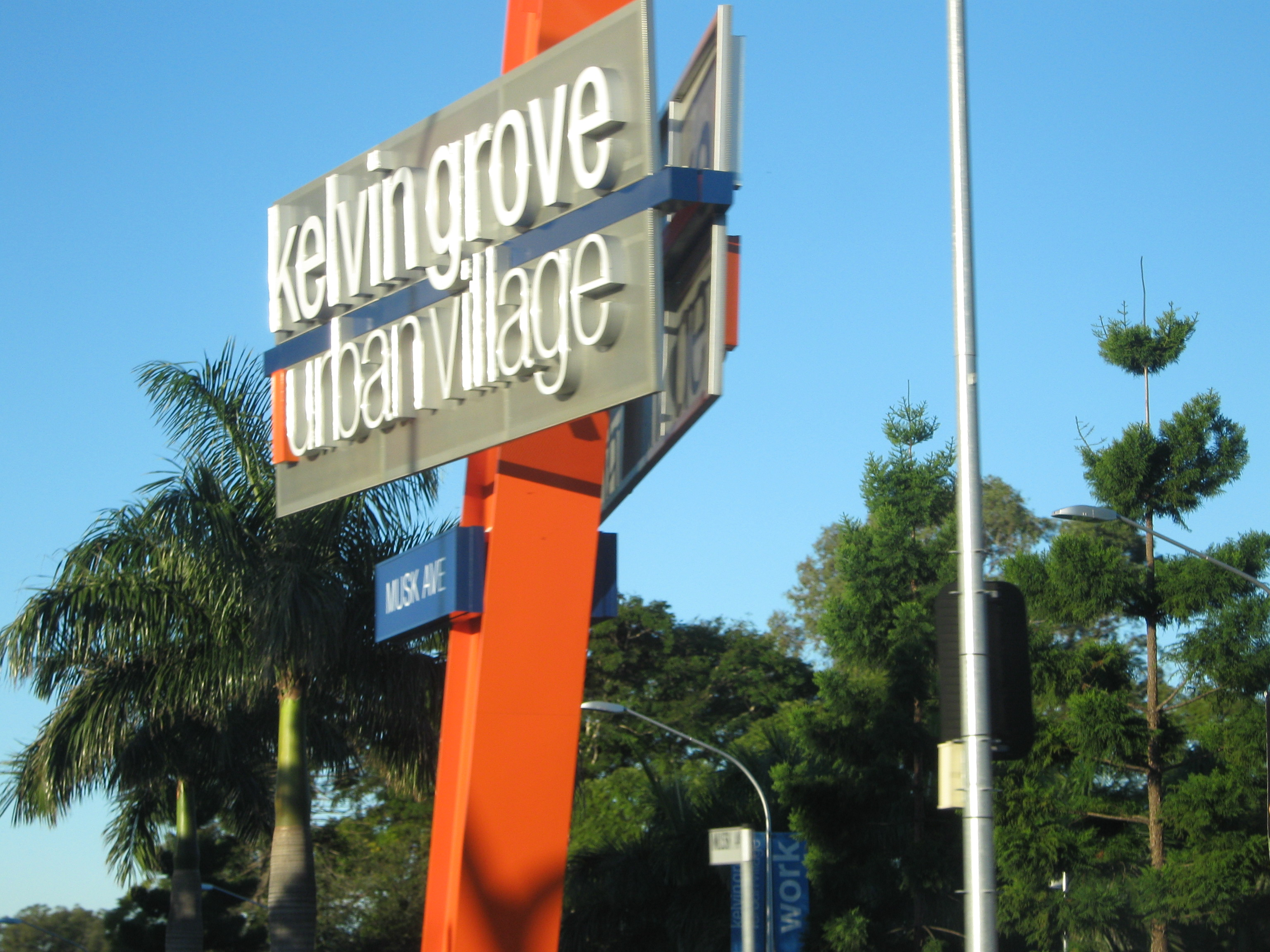
Kelvin Grove Urban Village sign, 2008

The Queensland Department of Housing purchased the 7-hectare (17-acre) Gona Barracks site in 2000 for $7,000,000. Queensland University of Technology operated its Kelvin Grove campus (formerly the campus of the Brisbane College of Advanced Education and other predecessor institutions) on an adjacent site and desired to expand their campus. Brisbane City Council which controlled adjacent parkland wanted to develop a Local Area Plan that would maximise opportunities for such a large site so close to the Brisbane CBD. Difficulties associated with any redevelopment included steep slopes and contaminated land.

A heritage assessment of the Gona Barracks site determined that it was the buildings of the upper barracks around the parade ground that, as a group, were of a greatest significance. A partnership between the Queensland Department of Housing, Brisbane City Council and the Queensland University of Technology was formed to develop a mixed-use urban village precinct using the Gona Barracks site and adjacent land. The university built its Creative Industries precinct re-using Gona Barracks buildings and introducing new buildings, sited to reinforce the rectangular form of the Gona barracks parade ground. The re-development won major planning and design awards from the Urban Development Institute of Australia.

== Description ==
Gona Barracks occupies a site of almost seven hectares in the inner northern Brisbane suburb of Kelvin Grove. The complex comprises approximately 70 individual buildings, located in two fairly evenly divided areas known as the "upper barracks", accessed via Kelvin Grove Road, and the "lower barracks" entered from Sylvan Road. The upper barracks area features an expansive central parade ground area, around which a group of buildings is arranged. The lower barracks feature two main groups of buildings set within grassed and bituminised areas.

=== Upper Barracks ===
==== Gun Park Shed 1 ====
The upper barracks area contains two gun park sheds. The first of these is located to the north west of the Kelvin Grove Road entry to the site. The building is a long single-storey timber structure, set on a concrete base, with a gabled roof sheeted in corrugated steel. Original timber doors to the elevation facing the parade ground have been replaced with roller and tilting metal doors. The end rooms contain their original doors and windows. A series of horse-hitching rails are located along the length of the western side of this building.

==== Gun Park Shed 2 ====
The second gun park shed located on the barracks site mirrors the other gun park shed in construction materials and design. It also contains some early VJ timber linings and early room divisions, although the main gun park space has been subdivided. A ceramic drinking fountain situated on the edge of the parade ground outside this building may be original to its construction. This shed also features a series of horse hitching rails on the western elevation.

==== Artificers workshop (store) ====
West of gun park shed 2 is the artificers workshop. It is a small single-storey building on a concrete base with a timber frame clad in ribbed steel sheeting with a gabled roof sheeted in the same material. Internally, the building has two main rooms, one set at a slightly lower level than the other. The building may have been built in two stages. One section appears to be of early construction, and modern cladding has been applied to the outside. This building has been extensively reworked over the years.

==== Storeroom ====
Adjacent to the artificers workshop. on the western extreme of the site, is a c. 1950s storeroom. It is a small single-storey building constructed of a timber frame with part-height corrugated iron sheeting roughly applied, and steel mesh to the upper portions with an earth floor. The shallow-pitch gabled roof is sheeted with corrugated iron. A timber door is centrally located.

==== Artillery Drill Hall (Admin) ====
The 1915 Artillery drill hall is positioned at right angles to the number 2 gun park shed, on a north-east – south-west axis, near the western boundary of the site. The building addresses the central parade ground area. The hall is a long, predominantly single-storey building constructed of timber weatherboards, with a two-storey section at the western end, reflecting its original construction as two separate buildings. Roofs to both buildings are gabled and sheeted with corrugated steel.

The two-storey section of the building to the west features original flanking single-storey wings. Some original timber double doors on the ground floor of this building remain, while weatherboards and roller doors have been inserted where other timber double doors once existed. One of two original flights of stairs to the building remain. The lecture room on the first floor exists in its original configuration.

In the eastern section of the building, some original timber double doors are infilled with weatherboards, louvre windows and single doors. To the northern elevation, aluminium framed windows and doors are positioned in many original door openings.

Internally, there are a number of original VJ walls and ceiling linings, while the large central hall has a more recent suspended ceiling. The hall is subdivided into two smaller areas, one of which is further subdivided by part-height partitions.

==== Sanitation, ablutions and latrine blocks ====
Two sanitation, ablutions and latrine blocks are located to the north-east of the Artillery drill hall. The block closest the hall is currently a female toilet, and appears to have been constructed as an earth closet in association with the Artillery drill hall. It is a small single-storey weatherboard building sitting on a concrete base, with a gabled roof sheeted in corrugated iron. A corrugated iron screen shields the entrance to the toilet from the parade ground.

The neighbouring circa World War II toilet block is a small single-storey structure, clad in weatherboards on a concrete base, with a skillion roof sheeted in corrugated steel. It appears to have been built on the site of an earlier wireless hut.

To the north of the ablution blocks are two c. 1980s buildings, an armoury and lecture room. The armoury is a small single-storey masonry building on a concrete base sheeted in corrugated steel and skillion roof. The lecture room is a portable metal-clad building set on low stumps.

==== Engineer's (RAE) depot (admin) ====
The 1915 Engineer's (RAE) depot is located east of the Artillery drill hall, and sits at right angles to this building. It is a two-storey timber framed weatherboard building with an additional two-storey wing at the southern end constructed at right angles to the original building. The gabled roof is sheeted with corrugated steel. Access to the building from the parade ground is gained to the upper floor via four bridges. The site drops away dramatically around this building and to the east access to the building is made to the lower floor.

Internally, full-height partitions divide the central space, creating individual offices, while the lower floor features messes. Early VJ linings to the perimeter walls on the upper level exist, while the lower level has mostly recent linings and finishes although the timber post and beam structure remains visible. A face brick wall lines a large part of the lower level on the parade ground side. An original timber door to the waggon shed on the lower level exist, while timber infill and new doors and windows are in place where other timber doors were once located.

The later wing contains several rooms on the upper level and a large modern kitchen below.

A tennis court is located to the east of the Engineer's depot, and a flagpole is located in the parade ground area to the west.

==== Parade ground structures ====
The central parade ground area is located to the south of the structures noted above. It is a bitumenised area with storage compounds and small shelter sheds located on its eastern elevation. The most substantial structure in this area is a c. 1980s single-storey building set on a concrete base covered with steel sheeting, comprising seven bays with roller shutters.

==== Toowong drill hall (admin) ====
The 1915 Toowong drill hall is located to the east of the central parade ground area. The hall is a large timber-framed building sheeted in corrugated iron. It sits on concrete stumps and bearers with infill of corrugated iron sheeting, forming a basement level.

South of the Toowong drill hall is a c. 1980s armoury. It is a single-storey building on a concrete base sheeted with corrugated steel, with a skillion roof. This building is not of cultural heritage significance.

==== Australian Army Service Corps (AASC) drill hall ====
The AASC drill hall is located south of the Toowong drill hall, in the eastern corner of the upper barracks site. It is a long single-storey timber building set on a concrete base. A centrally located double-storey height section is flanked by lower, single-storey wings. The gabled roof is sheeted with corrugated steel. Some original windows and doors survive, while others have been replaced with steel tilting doors. The building also features aluminium awnings. Internally, the original drill room space contains a series of offices with part height partitioning and suspended ceilings. Some early VJ timber partitions and linings remain and the timber roof trusses exist above the suspended ceilings. The eastern end of the building contains a bar and mess area.

To the rear of the AASC drill hall, on the south-western corner of the building, is a timber toilet block set on a concrete base, with a skillion roof sheeted with corrugated iron. It is joined to the drill hall via an attached shower block.

A c. 1970s toilet block, and c. 1980s shelter are also located to the rear of the AASC drill, at the eastern end of the building. These structures are not of cultural heritage significance.

==== Frank Moran Memorial Hall ====
The Frank Moran Memorial Hall is located south-west of the AASC drill hall. It is a single-storey timber building sited on low concrete stumps, with a gabled roof sheeted with corrugated steel. A skillion roofed addition is located to the rear of the building to the south. The interior features VJ timber walls and original ceiling lining.

Located adjacent to the memorial hall is a concrete slab which originally supported a post World War II petrol, oil and lubricant store.

==== Infantry drill hall ====
The 1914 Infantry drill hall is located in the southern corner of the upper barracks site. It is a large single-storey building, timber framed and sheeted in corrugated iron, with a gabled roof also sheeted in corrugated iron. The building has a concrete floor that is not original. A 1939 skillion roofed addition is located to the northern end of the building, and another addition exists to the south. Internally, most of the drill room space is intact with exposed roofing. There are offices with original timber linings and doors, located along the western elevation.

On the south-western corner of the building is a 1914 latrine building. It is a small timber-framed building sheeted with corrugated iron, and has a simple gable roof with a skillion attached and sits on a concrete base.

A 1930s fire hut is also sited on this corner of the drill hall. It is a single-storey building on a concrete base, timber framed and sheeted in corrugated iron with a corrugated iron roof.*

A small metal-clad storage shed built on a concrete base is located to the west of the drill hall, along the property boundary on Kelvin Grove Road. This structure is not of cultural heritage significance.

==== Garage and workshop ====
The 1941–42 garage and workshop building is sited adjacent to the Infantry drill hall, along the western elevation of the central parade area. It is a large single-storey building set on a concrete base, sheeted and roofed in corrugated iron. The roof has a saw-tooth profile. Internally, the building is divided into various rooms, some with suspended ceilings. The steel structure remains and is visible through most of the building.

Three small structures are located north-west of the garage and workshop. One is a c. 1940s bowser store, consisting of a timber frame supporting a corrugated iron roof, sheltering two petrol bowsers. Another is a c. 1950s-60s small single-storey storeroom set on a concrete base, timber framed and sheeted with corrugated iron, with a gabled, corrugated iron roof. The third building is a c. 1980s latrine. It is a demountable or pre-fabricated type amenities block and is not of cultural heritage significance.

==== Army Research recruiting component ====
This building is located on the western side of the main entry to the site from Kelvin Grove Road. The c. 1930s structure is a single-storey timber building on low concrete and steel stumps. The building has a gabled roof sheeted in corrugated iron. Two building wings extend to the east and west of the main part of the structure. Internally, the building comprises a number of rooms to the north and a large room to the east. Opening off this large room is a kitchen containing some early windows and doors. Other windows are of more recent installation, as are wall linings, ceilings and floor coverings. The building has early loft storage areas accessed by ladder at each end of the main section.

A flagpole is located to the north of this building, in the centre of the main entry to the site.

=== Lower barracks ===
The lower barracks area is located to the north-east of the upper barracks area. A driveway joining the two barracks areas runs from the north-western elevation of the Engineers' depot to the eastern elevation of the Quartermasters store in the lower barracks area. External access to the lower barracks area is gained via Blamey Street and Kelvin Grove Road, through the upper barracks. The area developed for Engineers is located in the northern portion of the lower barracks, while the area for Signals is positioned in the southern portion of the site.

The Engineers area is reached immediately upon entering the lower barracks from Blamey Street. A group of seven buildings are loosely organised around a bitumen area, and include administration buildings, a bridging store, an armoury and quartermasters store, an RAE training assembly hall and a 1970s prefabricated lecture room. The bridging store is a timber-framed shed building, while the other structures in the Engineers area are timber or steel framed buildings, set on concrete stumps and featuring weatherboard cladding and corrugated iron or steel roofs. The Engineers buildings are a mixture of structures built both on-site, and relocated from Wacol Army Barracks in 1953.

South of the Engineers area is a group of buildings established in an "L" configuration around a bitumen area for Signals men and women. Some of the structures, including a battery room, Signals Corps Area Assembly Hall, a latrine, an administration building, a lecture room and a c. 1970s shelter shed were constructed on-site, while other administration buildings, a canteen and a surgery were relocated to the site from the Wacol Army Barracks in 1953. The buildings are generally timber or steel framed with weatherboard cladding and corrugated iron and steel roofs, set on concrete stumps. The 1970s shelter shed is a concrete block building.

Located between the Engineers and Signals areas, on the eastern border of the site, is the PMG School for Linesmen in Training building. It is a two-storey timber-framed building sheeted in fibrous cement panelling. c. 1970s "wash point" is cited south of the School for Linesmen building, across a roadway and open area. It is a concrete parking area with storage sheds at one end used for the washing down of vehicles.

=== Landscape ===
The Gona Barracks site contains a variety of trees and shrubs, endemic, planted and self-seeded, that have developed over time with the development of the site. The trees can be broadly classified according to the period of planting as indicated by their size, species and location.

==== Vegetation which predates army occupation ====
One Ficus platypoda along the Kelvin Grove alignment appears to be the only remnant vegetation on site.

==== Interwar vegetation ====
A significant stand of stately Jacaranda acutifolia and Grevillea robusta trees planted as an avenue along the roadway between the Engineers' depot and the Toowong drill hall in the upper barracks area, forms the most significant stand of vegetation on the site. It appears the embankment and roadway on which these trees stand was in existence by 1925. Within this group are a number of Phytolacca dioica which are possibly of a similar age.

==== Postwar vegetation ====
A group of assorted trees including exotic species and some Queensland rainforest trees are to be found on the embankment below the parade ground area.

==== Self-sown trees ====
Numerous isolated trees have seeded themselves throughout the site and in particular on batters created during earthworks in the 1920s on the upper barracks and in 1953 on the lower barracks. Several isolated Ficus platypoda occur is scattered locations on the lower barracks. These specimens are of a moderate size and may have self-sown, planted or may be remnant.

== Heritage listing ==
Gona Barracks was listed on the Queensland Heritage Register on 7 February 2005 having satisfied the following criteria.

The place is important in demonstrating the evolution or pattern of Queensland's history.

The former Gona Barracks is important in demonstrating the pattern of Queensland's history as evidence of Queensland's preparations for military involvement in various world conflicts. Specifically, Gona Barracks is associated with the expansion of military training for militia forces after the introduction of compulsory military training in 1911, the provision of facilities for specialist militia units, and the continuation of voluntary military forces until 1998. The place contains World War I drill halls built for militia units of infantry, and more specialised groups such as the artillery, engineers and service corps, and as such demonstrates the extent of the various sections of the armed forces at the time and the commitment of the citizen soldiers who composed these units. The general size of the barracks site also demonstrates the site's early history as the Brisbane Grammar School endowment, from 1879 to 1911.

The place demonstrates rare, uncommon or endangered aspects of Queensland's cultural heritage.

The World War I era buildings in the upper barracks area of Gona Barracks demonstrate rare aspects of Queensland's cultural heritage as a surviving precinct of buildings from this period, and as examples of the early design of buildings by the Commonwealth. The concentration of drill halls, and the number of different types of drill halls for the various services sited at one location was not a common military practice at the time. The gun park, services, artillery and engineers drill halls are rare surviving examples of their type.

The place has potential to yield information that will contribute to an understanding of Queensland's history.

Gona Barracks has the potential to yield information that will contribute to an understanding of Queensland's history as the World War I buildings in the upper barracks demonstrate the development of military technology. The buildings constructed for the artillery, service corps and engineers demonstrate in their form and room layouts the important role played by horses in military activity at that time, which was later supersede by motorised transportation.

The place is important in demonstrating the principal characteristics of a particular class of cultural places.

Gona Barracks is important in demonstrating the principal characteristics of a particular class of cultural places, as the layout of the World War I buildings illustrate the military use of the site. This group of buildings was carefully and deliberately placed around a central parade ground area, a practice which was followed in other parts of Australia. The World War II buildings also demonstrate the principal characteristics of this type of building, constructed of timber with corrugated iron roofs, elevated on low stumps.

The place is important because of its aesthetic significance.

Gona Barracks is important because of its aesthetic significance. The World War I buildings in the upper barracks area are of aesthetic significance as a group of similarly scaled buildings constructed of timber, positioned around a central open space or parade ground area. These qualities are enhanced by the overall intactness of the exteriors of most of these buildings.

The place has a strong or special association with a particular community or cultural group for social, cultural or spiritual reasons.

Gona Barracks has a special association with a substantial part of Queensland's military community. As a military training ground since the early years of World War I until 1998, thousands of servicemen and women have an association with the site which has played an active role during the major periods of defence organisation in this country. In more recent years, it has functioned as an Army recruiting centre, particularly for the Army Reserve who were based at the site.
