= Urban Development Institute of Australia =

Australian think tank

- Abbreviation: UDIA
- Formation: 1962; 64 years ago
- Type: Nonprofit think tank
- Location: Australia
- National President: Max Shifman
- Website: www.udia.com.au/html/

The Urban Development Institute of Australia (UDIA) is an Australian research and non-profit organisation, with offices in Queensland, New South Wales, Victoria, Western Australia, South Australia, Northern Territory and Australian Capital Territory.

== Core business ==
UDIA claims to be the housing development industry’s most broad representative, with more than 4,500 member companies: global enterprises, consultants, local governments, and small-scale developers, who inform and define UDIA's state-representative National Council. The organisation engages with Federal, State and Local Governments and their agencies on issues critical to the industry – covering tax, population, infrastructure, land use planning and beyond.
