= Chermside bus station =

Bus station in Chermside, Queensland, Australia

Chermside
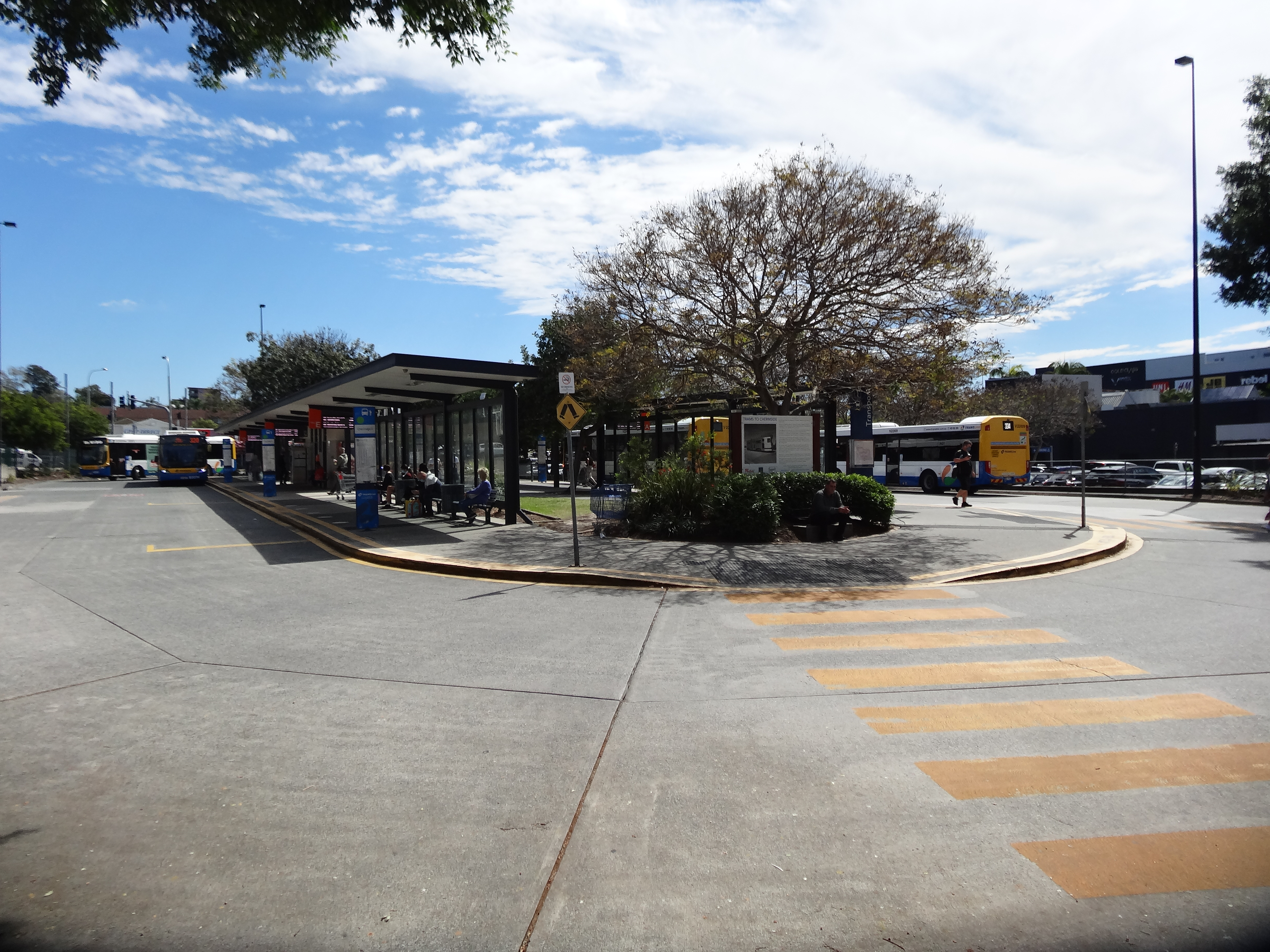

General information
- Location: Gympie and Hamilton Roads, Chermside
- Coordinates: 27.385786°S 153.031042°E
- Platforms: 2
- Bus routes: 22
- Bus stands: 9

Construction
- Parking: park 'n' ride
- Accessible: yes

Other information
- Station code: 003944 (Stop A); 003932 (Stop B); 003956 (Stop C); 003955 (Stop D); 003947 (Stop E); 003996 (Stop F); 003943 (Gympie Rd, Stop 37/38); 003934 (Gympie Rd, Stop 38); 003992 (Hamilton Rd, Chermside)
- Fare zone: 2
- Website: Translink

History
- Opened: 9 August 1999; 27 years ago
Location

Chermside is a bus station operated by Translink. It opened in 1999 and is located at Westfield Chermside in the Brisbane suburb of Chermside. It is a ground level station, featuring one island platforms with two faces and one side platform.

== Bus routes ==
The following bus routes services Chermside bus station:

Stop	Route number	Destination	Locations/roads serving
Stop A	333	Cultural Centre	Kedron, Lutwyche, RBWH, QUT Kelvin Grove, Normanby, King George Square
Stop B	358	Strathpine Centre	Aspley, Bridgeman Downs, Albany Creek, Eatons Hill, Brendale
Stop B	370	Herschel Street	Kedron, Lutwyche, Windsor, RBWH, Fortitude Valley, Adelaide Street
Stop C	320	Edward Street	Wavell Heights, Clayfield, Wooloowin, Bowen Hills, Fortitude Valley
Stop C	322	Cultural Centre	Wavell Heights, Nundah, Toombul, Clayfield, Albion, Fortitude Valley, City
Stop C	337	Aspley (loop)	Geebung, Aspley Hypermarket, Chermside West
Stop D	334	Ann Street	Prince Charles Hospital, Kedron, Lutwyche, Windsor, RBWH, Fortitude Valley, City
Stop D	336	Aspley (loop)	Chermside West, Aspley Hypermarket, Geebung
Stop D	353	Elizabeth Street	McDowall, Stafford Heights, Stafford, Grange, Wilston, Windsor, RBWH, Fortitude Valley, City
Stop D	354	Brookside	Prince Charles Hospital, Kedron, Stafford, Stafford Heights, Everton Park, Mitchelton
Stop D	598	Great Circle Line (anti-clockwise)	Brookside, Ashgrove, Toowong, Indooroopilly, Salisbury, Coopers Plains, Sunnybank, Garden City, Mount Gravatt, Carindale, Cannon Hill, Nundah
Stop E	330	Bracken Ridge	Zillmere, Taigum
Stop E	340	Carseldine railway station	West Chermside, Aspley
Stop E	N339	Bracken Ridge	Zillmere, Taigum
Stop F	325	Boondall	Geebung, Zillmere, Taigum
Stop F	335	Sandgate station	Aspley, Carseldine, Zillmere, Boondall, Sandgate
Stop F	599	Great Circle Line (clockwise)	Nundah, Cannon Hill, Carindale, Mount Gravatt, Garden City, Sunnybank, Coopers Plains, Salisbury, Indooroopilly, Toowong, Ashgrove, Brookside
Stop F	680	Redcliffe	Aspley, Carseldine, Bald Hills, Strathpine, Lawnton, Petrie railway station, Kallangur, North Lakes bus station, Rothwell, Kippa-Ring
Gympie Rd, stop 37/38 (Stop G)	330	Cultural Centre	RBWH, QUT Kelvin Grove, Normanby, Roma Street, King George Square
Gympie Rd, stop 37/38 (Stop G)	333	Cultural Centre	Kedron, Lutwyche, RBWH, QUT Kelvin Grove, Normanby, King George Square
Gympie Rd, stop 37/38 (Stop G)	340	Woolloongabba	Kedron, Lutwyche, RBWH, QUT Kelvin Grove, Normanby, Ann Street
Gympie Rd, stop 37/38 (Stop G)	370	Herschel Street	Kedron, Lutwyche, Windsor, RBWH, Fortitude Valley, Adelaide Street
Gympie Rd, stop 37/38 (Stop G)	P331	George Street	RBWH, Spring Hill, Edward Street
Gympie Rd, stop 37/38 (Stop G)	P332	UQ Lakes	RBWH, Spring Hill, City, PA Hospital, Boggo Road, Dutton Park Place
Gympie Rd, stop 37/38 (Stop G)	P341	George Street	RBWH, Spring Hill, Edward Street
Gympie Rd, stop 38	P331	Bracken Ridge	Zillmere, Taigum
Gympie Rd, stop 38	P332	Zillmere	Murphy Road, Hansford Road
Gympie Rd, stop 38	P341	Taigum	Aspley, Carseldine, Fitzgibbon
Hamilton Rd at Chermside (Stop H)	77	Eight Mile Plains	Kedron, Kedron Brook, Lutwyche, Windsor, Buranda, Greenslopes, Holland Park West, Griffith University, Garden City
Hamilton Rd at Chermside (Stop H)	325	Queen Street	Stafford, Newmarket, Normanby, Roma Street
Hamilton Rd at Chermside (Stop H)	335	Queen Street	Stafford, Grange, Wilson, Windsor, Fortitude Valley
