= Cultural Centre busway station =

Bus station in Brisbane, Australia

Cultural Centre
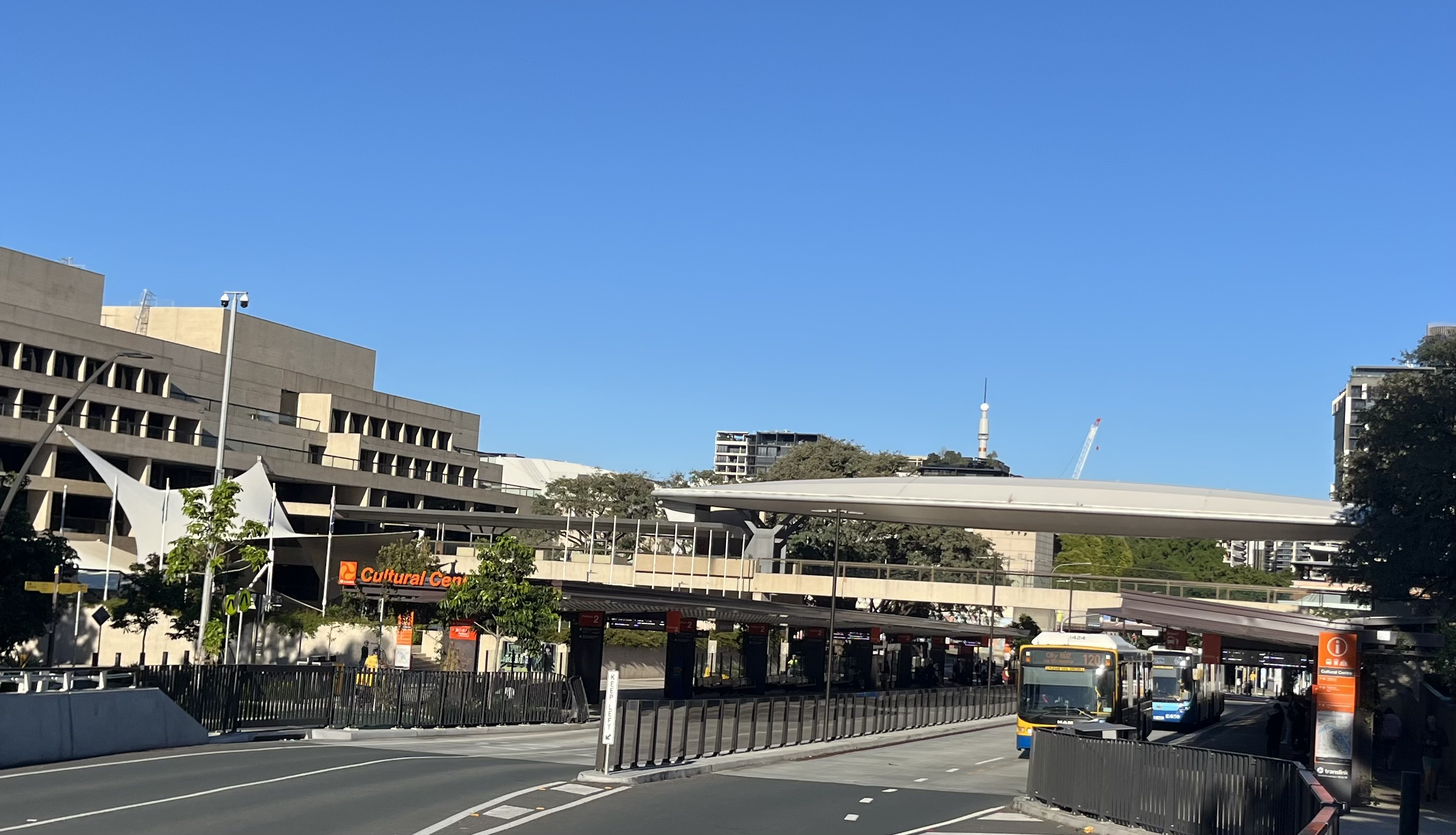
- Southbound view in July 2026

General information
- Location: Melbourne Street, South Brisbane
- Coordinates: 27°28′24″S 153°01′09″E
- Owner: Department of Transport & Main Roads
- Operator: Clarks Logan City Bus Service; Transport for Brisbane
- Line: South East
- Platforms: 3
- Bus routes: 40 (Including 11 NightLink services)
- Connections: South Brisbane railway station

Construction
- Accessible: Yes

Other information
- Station code: 010802 (platform 1); 011168 (platform 2); 012111 (platform 3)
- Website: Translink

History
- Opened: 23 October 2000; 26 years ago
- Rebuilt: 25 October 2004 (first rebuild); 2 June 2025 (second rebuild)

Services
Preceding station	Translink	Following station
King George Square Terminus	South East Busway	South Bank towards Springwood
Location

Cultural Centre is a busway station operated by Translink on the South East Busway. It opened in 2000 and is located directly south of Victoria Bridge, serving South Brisbane. It is a ground level station, featuring three side platforms.

== History ==
Cultural Centre busway station opened on 23 October 2000 when the South East Busway opened to Woolloongabba. It only had one lane in each direction with no ability for buses to pass.

Between March 2003 and October 2004, the station underwent its first renovation, with the platforms set back to allow for a passing lane in each direction. Some materials from the original station were reused in the construction of Capalaba bus station.

Between 2016 and 2020, Brisbane City Council proposed moving the station underground. The proposal was shelved due to disagreements between the state and council.

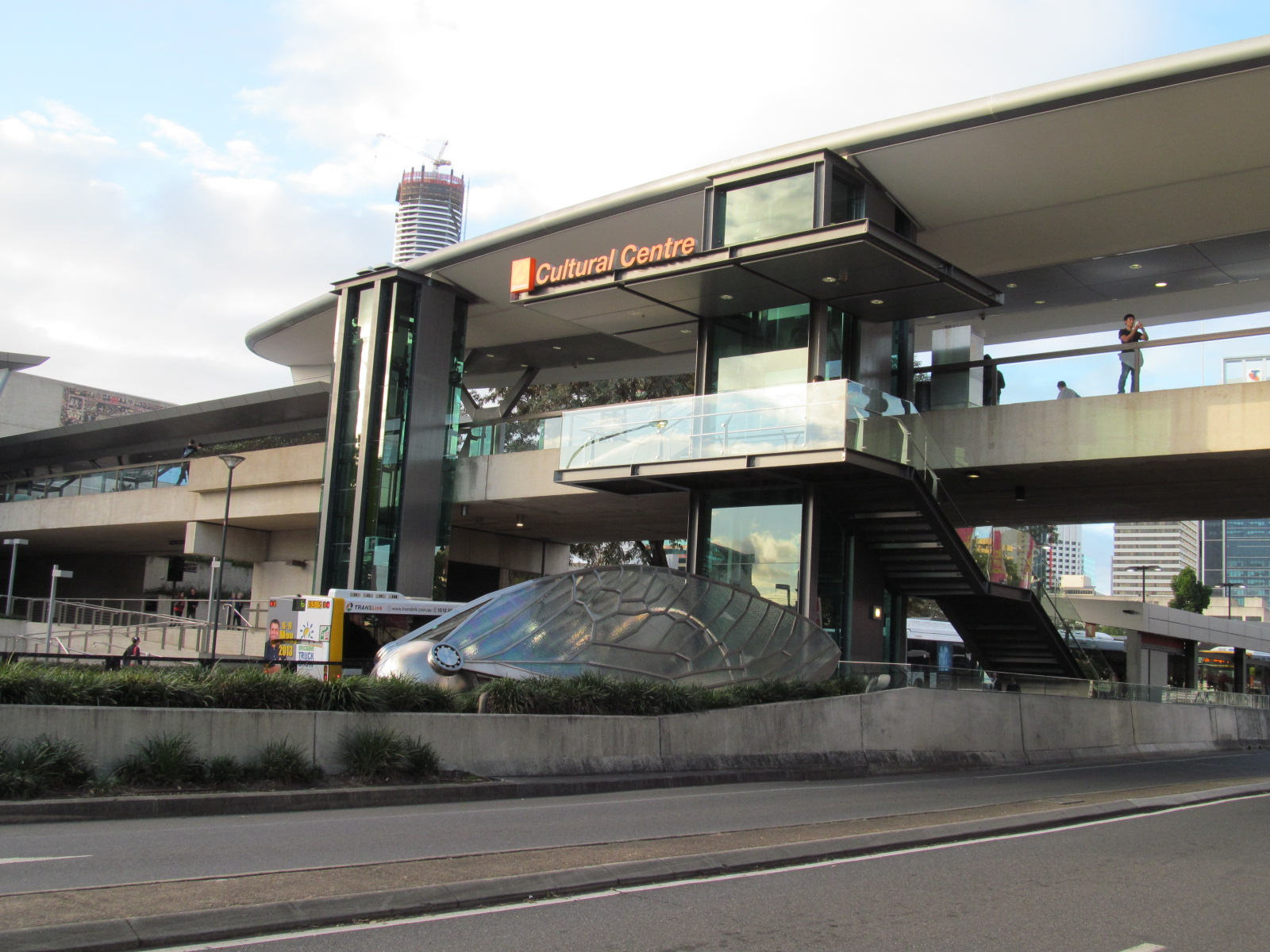
Sculpture in 2013

Between January 2022 and June 2025, the station underwent its second renovation, in order to support the introduction of Brisbane's New Bus Network and Brisbane Metro. As Victoria Bridge was closed to general traffic, platforms 1 and 2 were rebuilt, occupying the original traffic lanes to accommodate more passengers, and buses heading towards West End now stop at a new permanent platform 3, near the portal of the busway. The network changes resulted in fewer routes stopping at the station, from 70 to 40 (including NightLink services). A 10-metre long cicada sculpture was located at the station from 2004 to 2022 before being moved for the renovation.

== Platforms and services ==
=== Platform Arrangement ===
Cultural Centre platform arrangement
Platform	Line	Direction	Routes	Notes
1	South East Busway	Inbound	Brisbane Metro: M1, M2 CityGlider: 60, 61 Towards Southern Suburbs: 100, 120, 130, 140, 150, 180 (BUZ); 116, 555 South Brisbane Loop: 197 Towards West End: 196, 199 Towards Yeerongpilly: 107, 192 Towards Eastern Suburbs: 200, 222 (BUZ); 210, 212, 214, 215, 220, 230, 235 Towards Northern Suburbs: 300; 333 (BUZ) Towards Western Suburbs: 444 (BUZ) NightLink (Weekend midnight only): N100, N130, N184, N199, N200, N226, N250, N339, N345, N385, N555	
2	South East Busway	Outbound (Towards South East Busway)	Brisbane Metro: M1, M2 CityGlider: 60, 61 Towards Southern Suburbs: 100, 120, 130, 140, 150, 180 (BUZ); 116, 555 South Brisbane Loop: 197 Towards West End: 196, 199 Towards Yeerongpilly: 107, 192 Towards Eastern Suburbs: 200, 222 (BUZ); 210, 212, 214, 215, 220, 230, 235 Towards Northern Suburbs: 300; 333 (BUZ) Towards Western Suburbs: 444 (BUZ) NightLink (Weekend midnight only): N100, N130, N184, N199, N200, N226, N250, N339, N345, N385, N555	
3	South East Busway	Outbound (Towards Melbourne Street)	Brisbane Metro: M1, M2 CityGlider: 60, 61 Towards Southern Suburbs: 100, 120, 130, 140, 150, 180 (BUZ); 116, 555 South Brisbane Loop: 197 Towards West End: 196, 199 Towards Yeerongpilly: 107, 192 Towards Eastern Suburbs: 200, 222 (BUZ); 210, 212, 214, 215, 220, 230, 235 Towards Northern Suburbs: 300; 333 (BUZ) Towards Western Suburbs: 444 (BUZ) NightLink (Weekend midnight only): N100, N130, N184, N199, N200, N226, N250, N339, N345, N385, N555	

=== Route Description ===
Route	Destination		Branded Services
Route	Inbound	Outbound	Branded Services
Brisbane Metro
M1	Roma Street station	Eight Mile Plains station	
M2	RBWH station	UQ Lakes station	
CityGlider
60	Teneriffe	West End whalf	
61	Ashgrove	Coorparoo	
Southern Suburbs
100	Queen Street station	Forest Lake via Ipswich Road & Inala station	BUZ
120	Queen Street station	Garden City station via Coopers Plains	BUZ
130	Queen Street station	Parkinson via South East Busway, Mains Road & Algester	BUZ
140	Queen Street station	Browns Plains station via South East Busway, Mains Road & Calamvale	BUZ
150	Queen Street station	Browns Plains station via South East Busway & Runcorn	BUZ
180	Queen Street station	Garden City station via Cavendish Road	BUZ
196	New Farm	Fairfield via Adelaide Street & West End	BUZ
199	Teneriffe	West End whalf via Adelaide Street & Hardgrave Road	BUZ
107	Adelaide Street	Yeerongpilly via Boggo Road station	
116	Adelaide Street	Upper Mount Gravatt station via Moorooka & Salisbury	
192	Adelaide Street	Yeerongpilly via UQ Lakes station & West End	
197	Adelaide Street	South Brisbane loop via Stephens Road	
555	Adelaide Street	Loganholme station via South East Busway & Pacific Motorway	
N100*	Fortitude Valley	Richlands railway station via Ipswich Road, Inala & Forest Lakes	NightLink
N130*	Fortitude Valley	Parkinson via South East Busway, Mains Road & Algester	NightLink
N184*	Fortitude Valley	Garden City station via Coorparoo, Cavendish Road, Mount Gravatt East & Wernham Street	NightLink
N555	Fortitude Valley	Loganholme station via South East Busway & Daisy Hill	NightLink
N199	Teneriffe	West End whalf via Adelaide Street & Hardgrave Road	NightLink
Eastern Suburbs
200	Queen Street station	Carindale Heights via Woolloongabba station & Old Cleveland Road	BUZ
222	Roma Street station	Carindale station via Eastern Busway & Old Cleveland Road	BUZ
210	Fortitude Valley at Ballow Street	Cannon Hill station via Stanley Road	
212	Fortitude Valley at Ballow Street	Carindale station via Seven Hills	
214	Fortitude Valley at Wickham Street	Cannon Hill station via Richmond Road	
215	Fortitude Valley at Wickham Street	Carindale station via Belmont Road	
220	Fortitude Valley at Wickham Street	Wynnum Beach via Wynnum Road	
230	Fortitude Valley at Wickham Street	Bulimba via Riding Road	
235	Fortitude Valley at Wickham Street	Bulimba via Morningside	
N200*	Fortitude Valley	Carindale Heights via Woolloongabba station & Old Cleveland Road	NightLink
N226*	Fortitude Valley	Wynnum West via East Brisbane, Wynnum Road, Manly West & Wynnum Beach	NightLink
N250*	Fortitude Valley	Capalaba via Old Cleveland Road, Carindale & Redland Bay Road	NightLink
Northern Suburbs
300	Queensland Theatre at Merivale Street	Toombul interchange via Hamilton	
333	Woolloongabba station	Chermside station via Northern Busway	BUZ
N339*	Fortitude Valley	Bracken Ridge via Northern Busway, Chermside, Zillmere & Taigum	
N345	Fortitude Valley	Aspley via Kelvin Grove Road, Alderley, Appleby Road & Chermside West	
N385	Fortitude Valley	The Gap via Paddington & Ashgrove	
Western Suburbs
444	Queensland Theatre at Merivale Street	Moggill via Toowong, Indooroopilly & Kenmore	BUZ

Note: NightLink routes with asterisk only provide outbound services.

== Facilities ==
The station takes its name from its location within the Queensland Cultural Centre precinct. The platforms are accessible from a pedestrian bridge linking the Queensland Performing Arts Centre to the Queensland Museum and Queensland Art Gallery. The station is also close to the Brisbane Convention & Exhibition Centre, Queensland Conservatorium Griffith University, South Bank Piazza and the western end of the South Bank Parklands.
