= QUT Kelvin Grove busway station =

Bus station in Brisbane, Australia

QUT Kelvin Grove
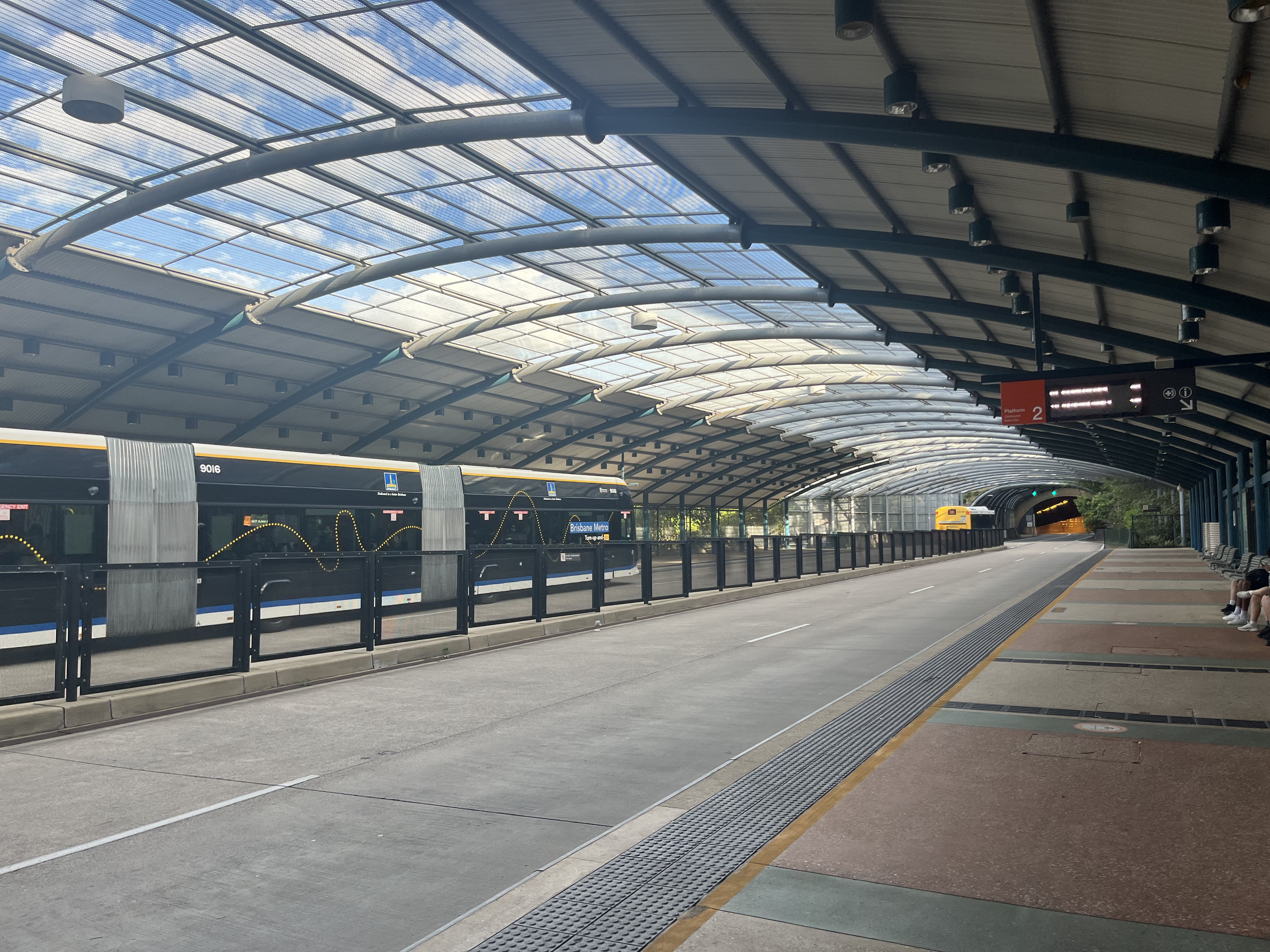
- QUT Kelvin Grove in July 2026

General information
- Location: Victoria Park, Kelvin Grove
- Coordinates: 27°27′06″S 153°01′06″E
- Owner: Department of Transport & Main Roads
- Operator: Transport for Brisbane
- Line: Northern
- Platforms: 2
- Bus routes: 4

Construction
- Accessible: Yes

Other information
- Station code: 000884 (platform 1); 000889 (platform 2)
- Fare zone: Zone 1
- Website: Translink

History
- Opened: 23 February 2004

Services
Preceding station	Translink	Following station
Normanby towards King George Square	Northern Busway	Herston towards Kedron Brook
Location

QUT Kelvin Grove is a busway station operated by Translink on the Northern Busway. It opened in 2004 and serves the Queensland University of Technology (QUT) campus located in the Brisbane suburb of Kelvin Grove. It is a ground level station, featuring two side platforms.

The station features golf ball protection screens due to its close proximity to the Victoria Park Golf Course.

== Platforms and services ==
QUT Kelvin Grove platform arrangement
Platform	Line	Direction	Routes	Notes
1	Northern Busway	Inbound	M2, 330, 333, 340	
2	Northern Busway	Outbound	M2, 330, 333, 340	
