= Herston busway station =

Bus station in Brisbane, Australia

Herston
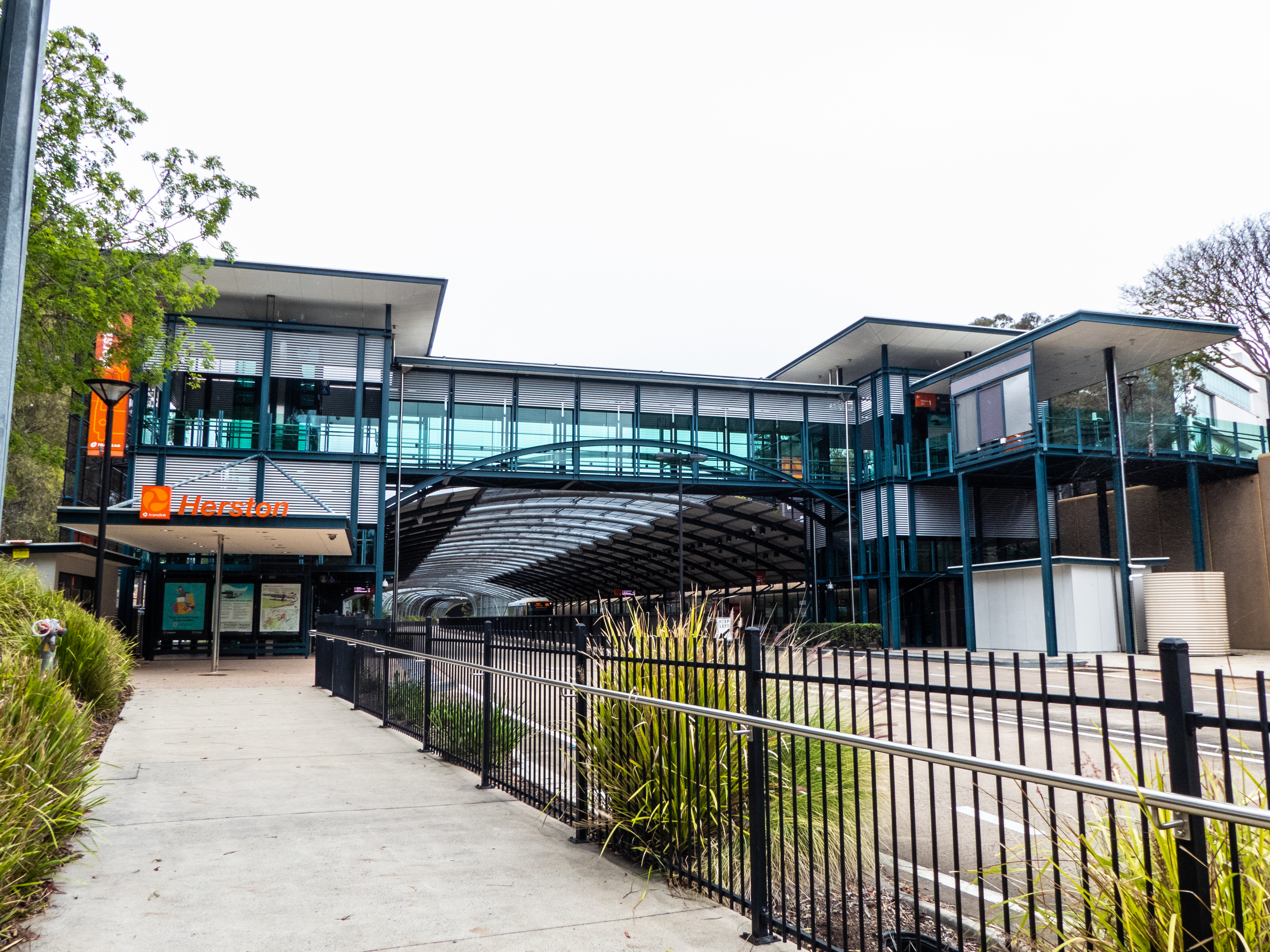
- Herston Station in July 2026

General information
- Location: Herston Road, Herston
- Coordinates: 27°26′59″S 153°01′30″E
- Owner: Department of Transport & Main Roads
- Operator: Transport for Brisbane
- Line: Northern
- Platforms: 2
- Bus routes: 14

Construction
- Structure type: Below ground
- Accessible: Yes

Other information
- Station code: 000891 (platform 1); 000890 (platform 2)
- Fare zone: Zone 1
- Website: Translink

History
- Opened: 14 December 2005
- Former names: RCH Herston

Services
| Preceding station | Translink | Following station |
|---|---|---|
| QUT Kelvin Grove towards King George Square | Northern Busway | RBWH towards Kedron Brook |
Location

Herston is a busway station operated by Translink on the Northern Busway. It opened in 2005 as RCH Herston and serves the Brisbane suburb of Herston. It is a below ground station, featuring two side platforms.

== Platforms and services ==
Herston platform arrangement
| Platform | Line | Direction | Routes | Notes |
|---|---|---|---|---|
| 1 | Northern Busway | Inbound | M2, 330, 331, 333, 340, 341, 349, 363, 426, 431, 443, 446, 455, 456 | |
| 2 | Northern Busway | Outbound | M2, 330, 331, 333, 340, 341, 349, 363, 426, 431, 443, 446, 455, 456 | |

The station is located adjacent to two local bus stops. It does not feature any cycling or drop off facilities.
