= Roma Street =

Roma Street may refer to:

- Roma Street, Brisbane, a street in the centre of Brisbane, Queensland, Australia
  - Roma Street busway station in Brisbane, Australia
  - Roma Street Parkland in Brisbane, Australia
  - Roma Street railway station in Brisbane, Australia
