= RBWH busway station =

Bus station in Brisbane, Australia

RBWH
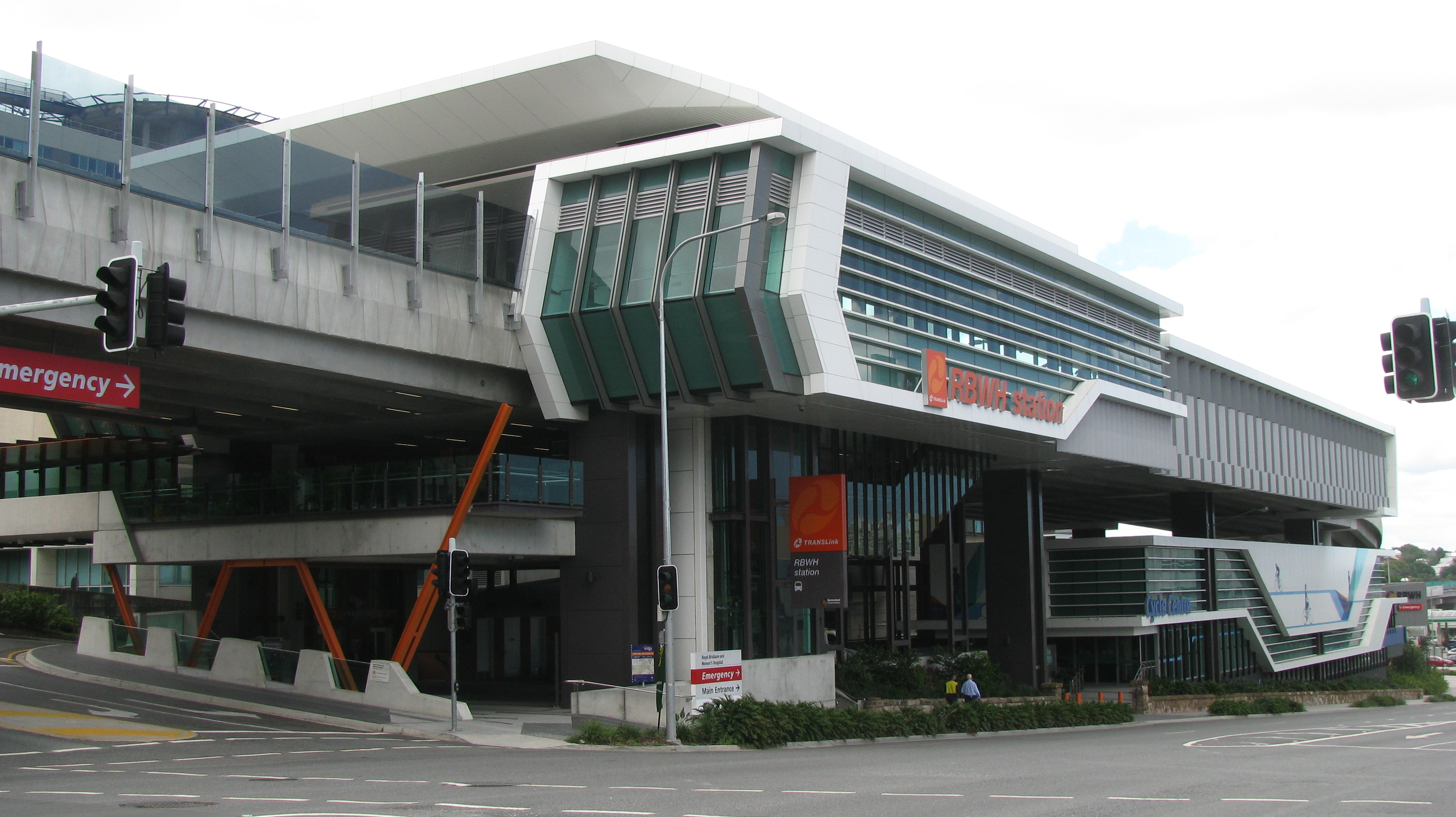
- RBWH busway station in December 2010

General information
- Location: Bowen Bridge Road, Herston
- Coordinates: 27°26′51″S 153°01′45″E
- Owner: Department of Transport & Main Roads
- Operator: Transport for Brisbane
- Line: Northern
- Platforms: 2 side
- Bus routes: 22

Construction
- Structure type: Elevated
- Cycle facilities: RBWH Cycle Centre
- Accessible: Yes

Other information
- Station code: 000897 (platform 1); 000896 (platform 2)
- Fare zone: Zone 1
- Website: Translink

History
- Opened: 3 August 2009

Services
Preceding station	Translink	Following station
Herston towards King George Square	Northern Busway	Lutwyche towards Kedron Brook
Location

RBWH is a busway station operated by Translink on the Northern Busway. It opened in 2009 and serves the Royal Brisbane and Women's Hospital (RBWH) in the Brisbane suburb of Herston. It is an elevated station, featuring two side platforms.

== Platforms and services ==
RBWH platform arrangement
Platform	Line	Direction	Routes	Notes
1	Northern Busway	Inbound	M2, 26, 309, 310, 321, 330, 331, 332, 333, 332, 335, 338, 340, 341, 346, 347, 348, 349, 353, 363, 922, 926	
2	Northern Busway	Outbound	M2, 26, 309, 310, 321, 330, 331, 332, 333, 332, 335, 338, 340, 341, 346, 347, 348, 349, 353, 363, 922, 926	

The station also features a large bicycle parking rack, known as the RBWH Cycle Centre.
