= Lutwyche busway station =

Bus station in Brisbane, Australia

Lutwyche

General information
- Location: Gympie Road, Lutwyche
- Coordinates: 27.420045°S 153.034358°E
- Owner: Department of Transport & Main Roads
- Operator: Transport for Brisbane
- Line: Northern
- Platforms: 2 side
- Bus routes: 6

Construction
- Structure type: Partial Underground
- Accessible: Yes

Other information
- Station code: 011272 (platform 1); 011271 (platform 2)
- Fare zone: go card 1
- Website: Translink

History
- Opened: 18 June 2012

Services
| Preceding station | Translink | Following station |
|---|---|---|
| RBWH towards King George Square | Northern Busway | Kedron Brook Terminus |
Location

Lutwyche is a busway station operated by Translink on the Northern Busway. It opened in 2012 and serves the Brisbane suburb of Lutwyche. It is a below ground level station, featuring two side platforms.

== Platforms and services ==
Lutwyche platform arrangement
| Platform | Line | Direction | Routes | Notes |
|---|---|---|---|---|
| 1 | Northern Busway | Inbound | 77, 332, 333, 340, 348, 349 | |
| 2 | Northern Busway | Outbound | 77, 332, 333, 340, 348, 349 | |

The station also features a bike rack.
