= Northern Busway =

Northern Busway may refer to:

- Northern Busway, Auckland, New Zealand
- Northern Busway, Brisbane, Australia
