= Normanby busway station =

Bus station in Brisbane, Australia

Normanby
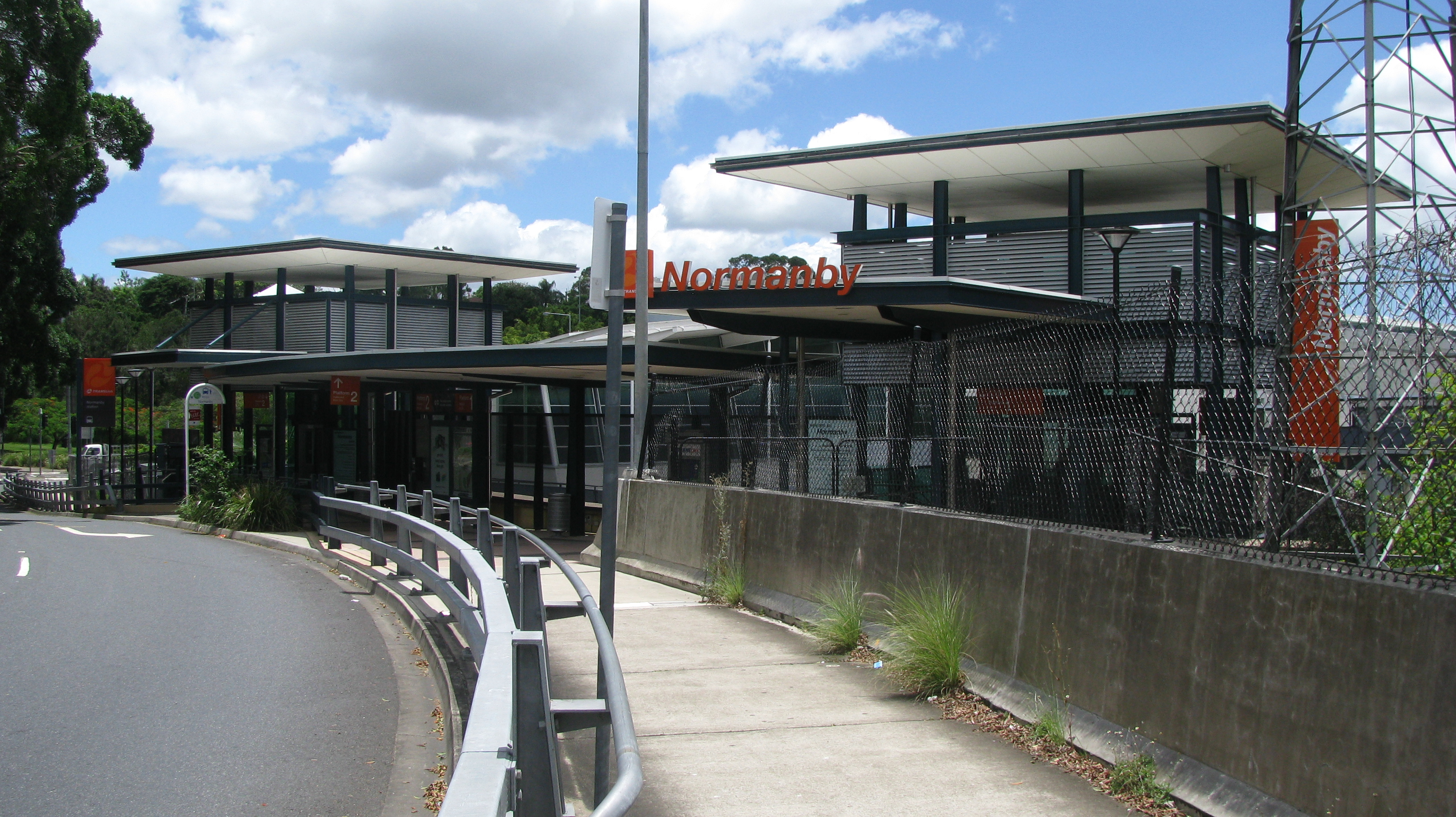

General information
- Location: Kelvin Grove Road, Kelvin Grove
- Coordinates: 27°27′33″S 153°00′54″E
- Owner: Department of Transport & Main Roads
- Operator: Transport for Brisbane
- Line: Northern
- Platforms: 2
- Bus routes: 13

Construction
- Accessible: Yes

Other information
- Station code: 000893 (platform 1); 000892 (platform 2)
- Fare zone: Zone 1
- Website: Translink

History
- Opened: 14 December 2005

Services
| Preceding station | Translink | Following station |
|---|---|---|
| Roma Street towards King George Square | Northern Busway | QUT Kelvin Grove towards Kedron Brook |
Location

Normanby is a busway station operated by Translink on the Northern Busway. It opened in 2005 and serves the Brisbane suburb of Kelvin Grove. It is a ground level station, featuring two side platforms.

It is served by eight routes operated by Transport for Brisbane as part of the Translink network. It is adjacent to Brisbane Grammar School and the Inner City Bypass.

It is located next to the former site of the Normanby railway station, which closed in 1966.

== Platforms and services ==
Normanby platform arrangement
| Platform | Line | Direction | Routes | Notes |
|---|---|---|---|---|
| 1 | Northern Busway | Inbound | M2, 325, 330, 331, 333, 340, 345, 351, 359, 363, 390, 426, 455, 456 | |
| 2 | Northern Busway | Outbound | M2, 325, 330, 331, 333, 340, 345, 351, 359, 363, 390, 426, 455, 456 | |
