= Normanby railway station =

Former railway station in Queensland, Australia

Normanby
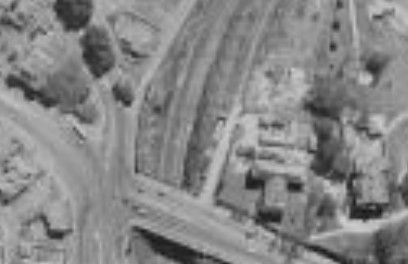
- Aerial view of Normanby station in August 1951

General information
- Coordinates: 27.45901°S 153.0152°E
- System: Closed commuter rail station
- Owner: Queensland Rail
- Operator: Queensland Rail
- Line: Exhibition
- Platforms: 1

Other information
- Status: Demolished

History
- Opened: 3 August 1882; 144 years ago
- Closed: 1966; 60 years ago
Location

Normanby was a railway station operated by Queensland Rail on the Exhibition line. It opened in 1882 and served the Brisbane suburb of Kelvin Grove until its closure in 1966. It was located next to a goods yard north of Roma Street station.

Since 2005, the Normanby busway station has been located next to the former site of the railway station.

== History ==
Normanby station opened on 3 August 1882 as an original station on the line between Roma Street, Mayne and Sandgate. In 1889, 40,000 passengers took trips to and from Normanby.

A direct line to Central station was opened on 18 August 1889, followed by a direct line to Mayne opening on 1 November 1890. Shortly after this, it was proposed by the Queensland Rail commissioners that Normanby would close because it did not have enough passenger traffic to justify remaining open, although this did not eventuate.

In 1900, the service between Exhibition station and Mayne was withdrawn, although the track remained in place. Passenger and goods services continued between Roma Street, Normanby, and Exhibition. The service between Exhibition and Mayne was restored in August 1911.

Normanby closed in 1966. A signal box was located next to the station and remained in place for at least one year after the platform was demolished.

Between 1885 and 1961, there was also a Normanby station located on the Cooktown Railway in Far North Queensland.
