= Roma Street railway station =

Railway station in Brisbane, Queensland

Roma Street
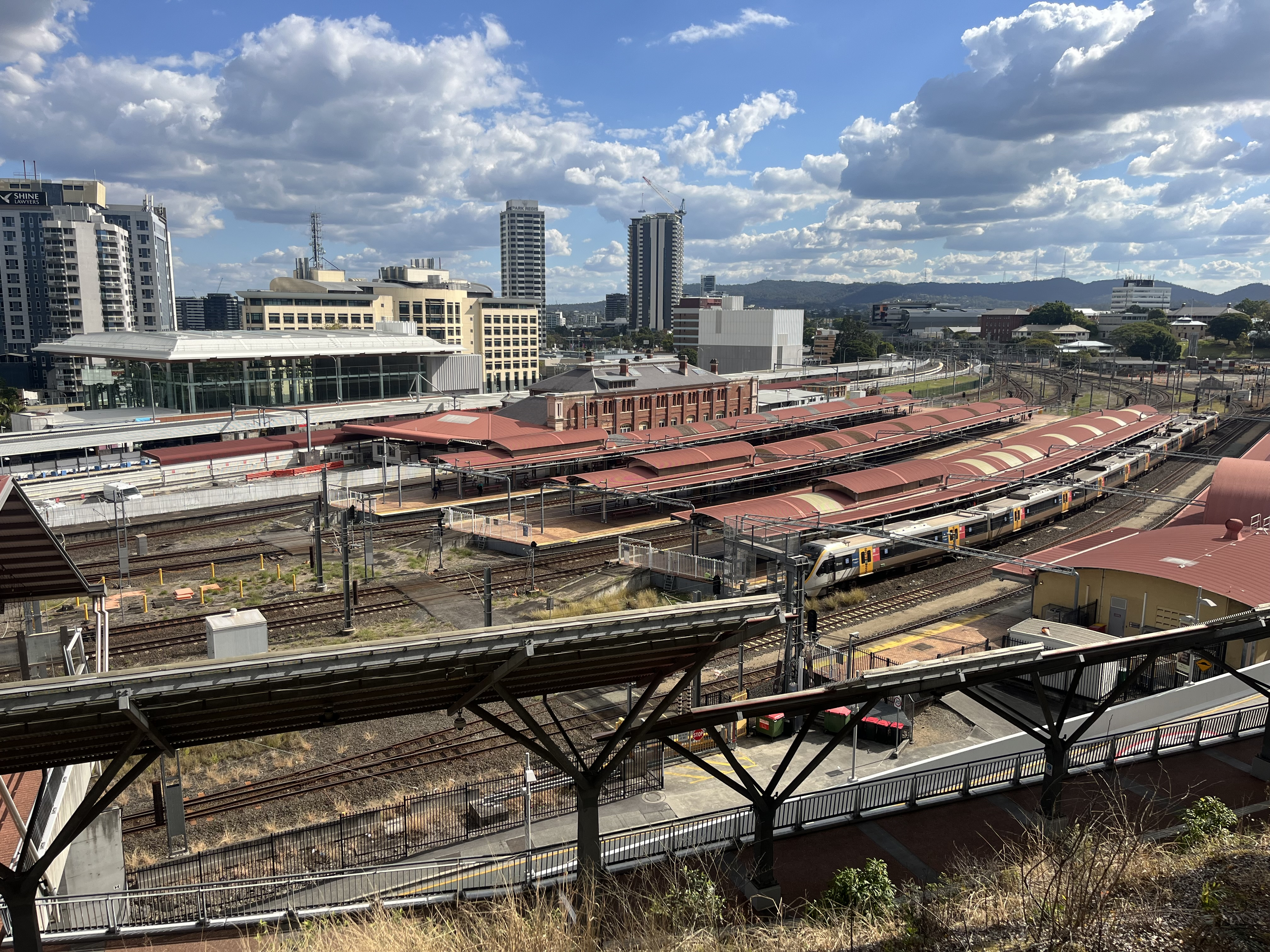
- View from upper Albert Street in August 2026

General information
- Location: Roma Street, Brisbane
- Coordinates: 27.4652°S 153.0191°E
- Owner: Queensland Rail
- Operator: Queensland Rail
- Lines: T1 Caboolture T1 Nambour/Gympie North T1 Ipswich/Rosewood; T2 Kippa-Ring T2 Springfield Central; T3 Doomben; T4 Shorncliffe T4 Cleveland; T5 Brisbane Airport T5 Varsity Lakes; T6 Beenleigh T6 Ferny Grove; Tilt Train Spirit of Queensland Spirit of the Outback Westlander; North Coast
- Distance: 0.75 kilometres (0.47 mi) from Central
- Platforms: 10 (4 side, 3 islands)
- Tracks: 10
- Connections: Roma Street busway station

Construction
- Structure type: Ground (Terraced)
- Accessible: Yes

Other information
- Status: Staffed
- Station code: 600037 (platform 2); 600033 (platform 3); 600036 (platform 4); 600034 (platform 5); 600030 (platform 6); 600028 (platform 7); 600029 (platform 8); 600038 (platform 9); 600035 (platform 10)
- Fare zone: Zone 1
- Website: Queensland Rail

History
- Opened: 14 June 1875; 151 years ago
- Former names: Brisbane

Passengers
- 2022–23: 1,780,252
- Rank: 3

Services
| Preceding station | Queensland Rail | Following station |
|---|---|---|
| Central towards Caboolture, Nambour or Gympie North | Ipswich/Rosewood line | Milton towards Ipswich or Rosewood |
| Central towards Kippa-Ring | Springfield Central line | Milton towards Springfield Central |
| Central towards Doomben | Doomben line | Terminus |
| Central towards Shorncliffe | Cleveland line | South Brisbane towards Cleveland |
| Central towards Domestic Airport | Varsity Lakes line | South Brisbane towards Varsity Lakes |
| Central towards Ferny Grove | Beenleigh line | South Brisbane towards Beenleigh |

Long-distance services
| Preceding station | Queensland Rail | Following station |
|---|---|---|
| Terminus | Spirit of Queensland | Caboolture towards Cairns |
| Terminus | Tilt Train | Caboolture towards Rockhampton |
| Terminus | Spirit of the Outback | Caboolture towards Longreach |
| Terminus | The Westlander | Corinda towards Charleville |

Interstate services
| Preceding station | NSW TrainLink | Following station |
|---|---|---|
| Terminus | NSW TrainLink North Coast Line Sydney XPT | Kyogle towards Sydney |
Location

Roma Street is a commuter and long-distance passenger railway station located in the central business district of Brisbane, Queensland. It is the junction station for the North Coast, Main, Gold Coast and NSW North Coast lines. The station is one of four inner city stations that form a core corridor through the centre of Brisbane.

Although not easily visible to the public, the original 1873 Roma Street railway station building still exists within the modern complex and is listed on the Queensland Heritage Register.

== History ==
=== 1800s to 1940s ===
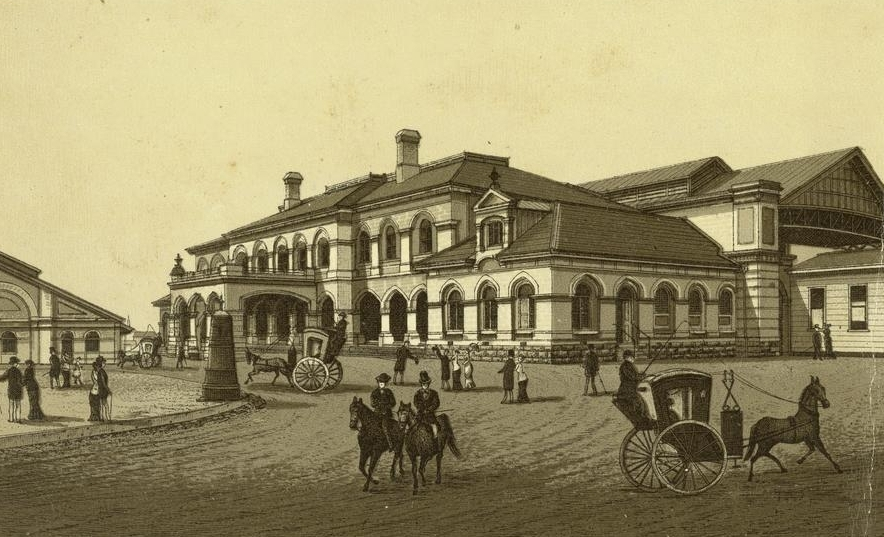
The station in 1883

The construction of a railway station on Roma Street was part of a plan to extend the Main Line to Brisbane. An iron station building designed by Sir Charles Fox & Sons was to be imported from the United Kingdom for this purpose, but economic problems in Queensland led to the order being cancelled. In 1873, the Superintendent of Public Buildings Francis Stanley designed a smaller station for the site, with construction beginning in the same year under John Petrie. The station was officially opened on 14 June 1875 as Brisbane at the same time that the Main Line opened to Indooroopilly.

A goods and carriage shed were added shortly after. In 1882, Roma Street became a junction station with the North Coast line opening to Sandgate. With the opening of Central station as Brisbane's principal station on 18 August 1889, the station was renamed Roma Street. As traffic grew, so did the Roma Street precinct with a locomotive shed added.

In 1911, the precinct was rearranged with the locomotive and carriage sheds relocated to Mayne near Bowen Hills.

On 30 November 1940, Roma Street again became the principal station for long-distance services with new platforms built to the south of the existing platforms.

=== 1970s to early 2000s ===
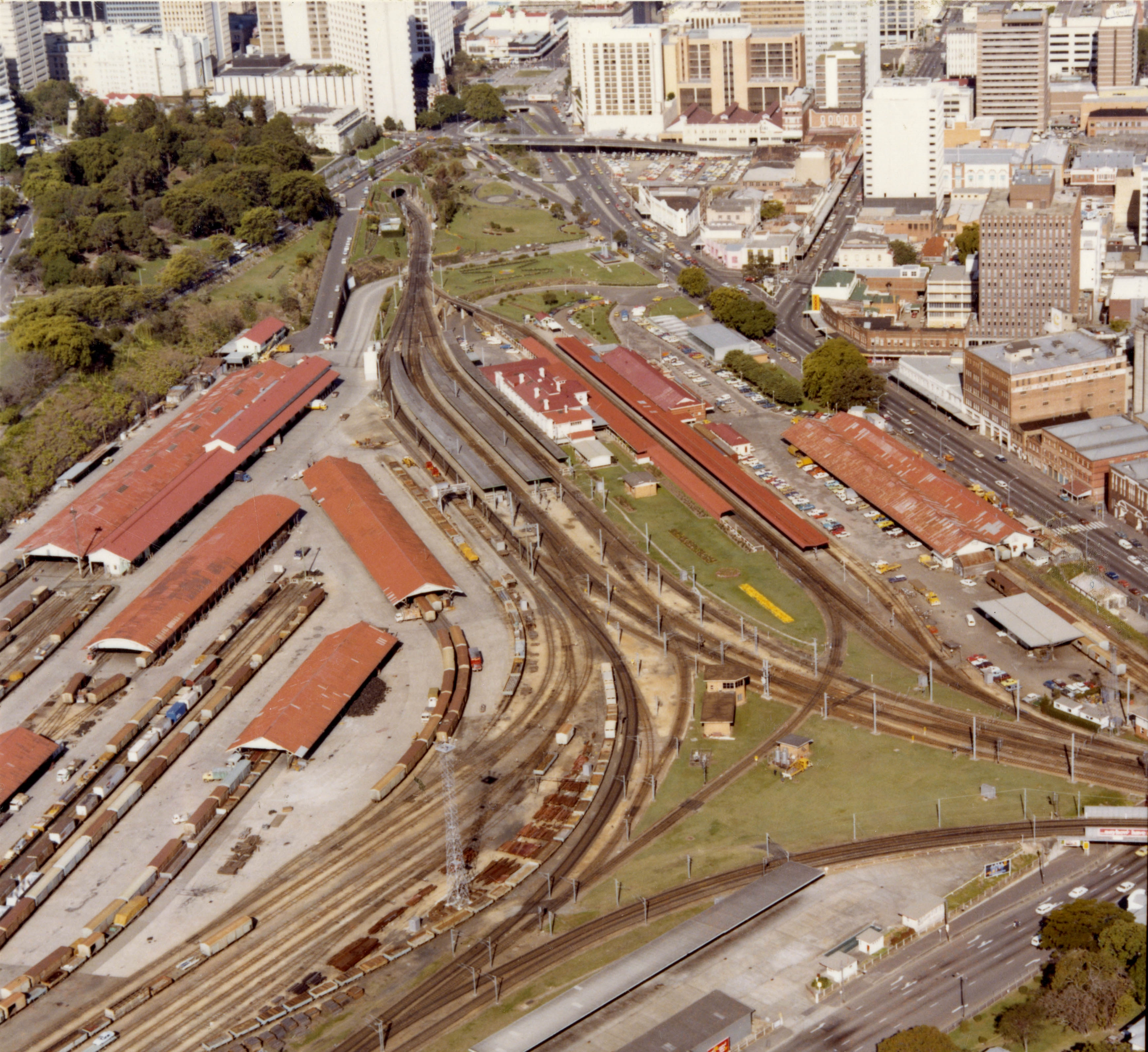
Roma Street station in 1983, prior to its expansion

Following the opening of the Merivale Bridge on 18 November 1978, Roma Street was also served by Beenleigh line services. On 21 June 1986, it became a dual gauge station with the extension of the standard gauge NSW North Coast line from South Brisbane. In October 1986, the Brisbane Transit Centre opened to the south of the station.

As part of the quadruplication of the North Coast line to Bowen Hills, the station was rebuilt. On 1 November 1995, a new Platform 10 was opened on the station's north side as the platform for long-distance services; these services had previously used Platforms 2 and 3. Platforms 7, 8 and 9 opened on 11 June 1996 while refurbished Platforms 4, 5 and 6 reopened in January 1997.

In 2001, Roma Street Parkland opened to the north of the station on the site of the former Roma Street goods yards. Visitors not travelling on Queensland Rail services can obtain a free pass to transit through the station concourse from Roma Street to the parklands.

Platform 1 became part of the Roma Street busway station on 19 May 2008, with the construction of the Inner Northern Busway.

=== Cross River Rail and Brisbane Metro Projects ===
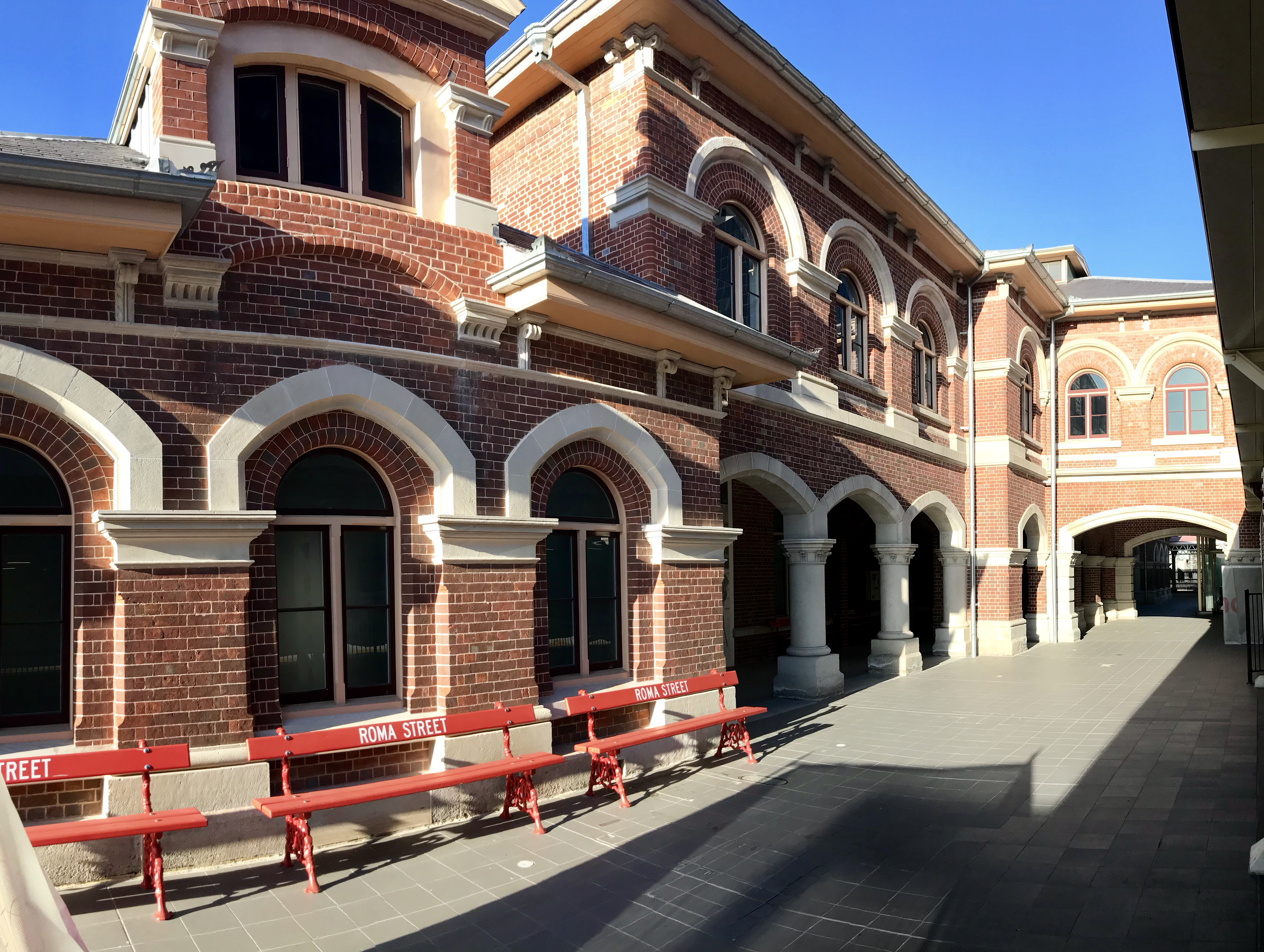
The original station building

Roma Street Station will be affected by both the Cross River Rail and Brisbane Metro projects.

The Brisbane Transit Centre complex was planned to be demolished in 2020. Businesses in the existing buildings were closed down between late 2018 and early 2019, with reports of controversy surrounding claims for compensation by small business tenants.

According to the Cross River Rail Construction plan, new underground platforms will be constructed to service Cross River Rail services. The next stations for the Cross River Rail services will be Albert Street (southbound) and Exhibition (northbound).

The Brisbane Metro Line 1 services terminate at Roma Street Station, with the previous station being King George Square. Brisbane Metro Line 2 services continue through Roma Street following the existing Northern Busway route, with the next stations being Normanby (northbound) and King George Square (southbound).

Due to the demolition of the Brisbane Transit Centre, a temporary long-distance bus terminal was constructed on the opposite side of Roma Street Station (near Platform 10) and opened in September 2019.

The Tunnel Boring Machine (TBM) Else broke through into the new Roma Street station cavern on the 6 August 2021. The second one, TBM Merle, arrived on 23 August 2021.

== Services ==
Roma Street station is served by all suburban and interurban City network lines.

It is also the terminus station for long-distance Traveltrain services and NSW TrainLink's service to Sydney. A motorail loading dock was previously located on Platform 10 but it was removed in 2015.

== Platforms and services ==
Roma Street
| Platform | Line | Type | Destination | | Notes |
|---|---|---|---|---|---|
| 1 | Northern Busway | Bus | Outbound | M1, M2, 61, 205, 222, 325, 330, 333, 340, 345, 350, 359, 385, 390, 444, 453, 454, 460 | |
| 2 (Note: Platform 2 is an island platform with the southern side used by inbound buses, while the northern side a rail platform that is currently closed. Both are technically platform 2, but the train platform does not have a number.) | Northern Busway | Bus | Inbound | M1, M2, 61, 205, 222, 325, 330, 333, 340, 345, 350, 359, 385, 390, 444, 453, 454, 460 | |
| 3 | NSW Trainlink North Coast | Rail | Sydney Central | | |
| 4 | T6 Beenleigh | Rail | Beenleigh | | |
| 4 | T5 Varsity Lakes | Rail | Varsity Lakes | | |
| 5 | T6 Beenleigh | Rail | Beenleigh | | |
| 5 | T4 Cleveland | Rail | Cleveland | | |
| 6 | T6 Beenleigh | Rail | Beenleigh | | |
| 6 | T6 Ferny Grove | Rail | Ferny Grove | | |
| 6 | T3 Doomben | Rail | Doomben | | |
| 6 | T5 Brisbane Airport | Rail | Domestic Airport | | |
| 6 | T5 Varsity Lakes | Rail | Varsity Lakes | | |
| 6 | T4 Shorncliffe | Rail | Shorncliffe | | |
| 7 | T6 Ferny Grove | Rail | Ferny Grove | | |
| 7 | T1 Caboolture | Rail | Caboolture | | |
| 7 | T3 Doomben | Rail | Doomben | | |
| 7 | T5 Brisbane Airport | Rail | Domestic Airport | | |
| 7 | T4 Shorncliffe | Rail | Shorncliffe | | |
| 7 | T1 Nambour/Gympie North | Rail | Nambour or Gympie North | | |
| 8 | T1 Ipswich/Rosewood | Rail | Ipswich or Rosewood | | |
| 8 | T2 Springfield Central | Rail | Springfield | | |
| 9 | T1 Caboolture | Rail | Caboolture | | |
| 9 | T2 Kippa-Ring | Rail | Kippa-Ring | | |
| 9 | T1 Nambour/Gympie North | Rail | Nambour or Gympie North | | |
| 10 | Spirit of Queensland | Rail | Cairns | | Long-distance services |
| 10 | Spirit of the Outback | Rail | Longreach | | Long-distance services |
| 10 | Tilt Train | Rail | Bundaberg or Rockhampton | | Long-distance services |
| 10 | The Westlander | Rail | Charleville | | Long-distance services |
| 11 | Under construction for Cross River Rail | | | | |
| 12 | Under construction for Cross River Rail | | | | |

== Transport links ==
To the north of the station is the Brisbane Coach Terminal that opened in 2019 as replacement for the Brisbane Transit Centre. It is used by long distance Bus Queensland, Crisps Coaches, Greyhound Australia, Murrays, NSW TrainLink and Premier Motor Service services.

To the south of the station is Roma Street busway station on the Northern Busway that is served by Transport for Brisbane.
