= Aspley bus station =

Bus station in Aspley, Queensland, Australia

Aspley
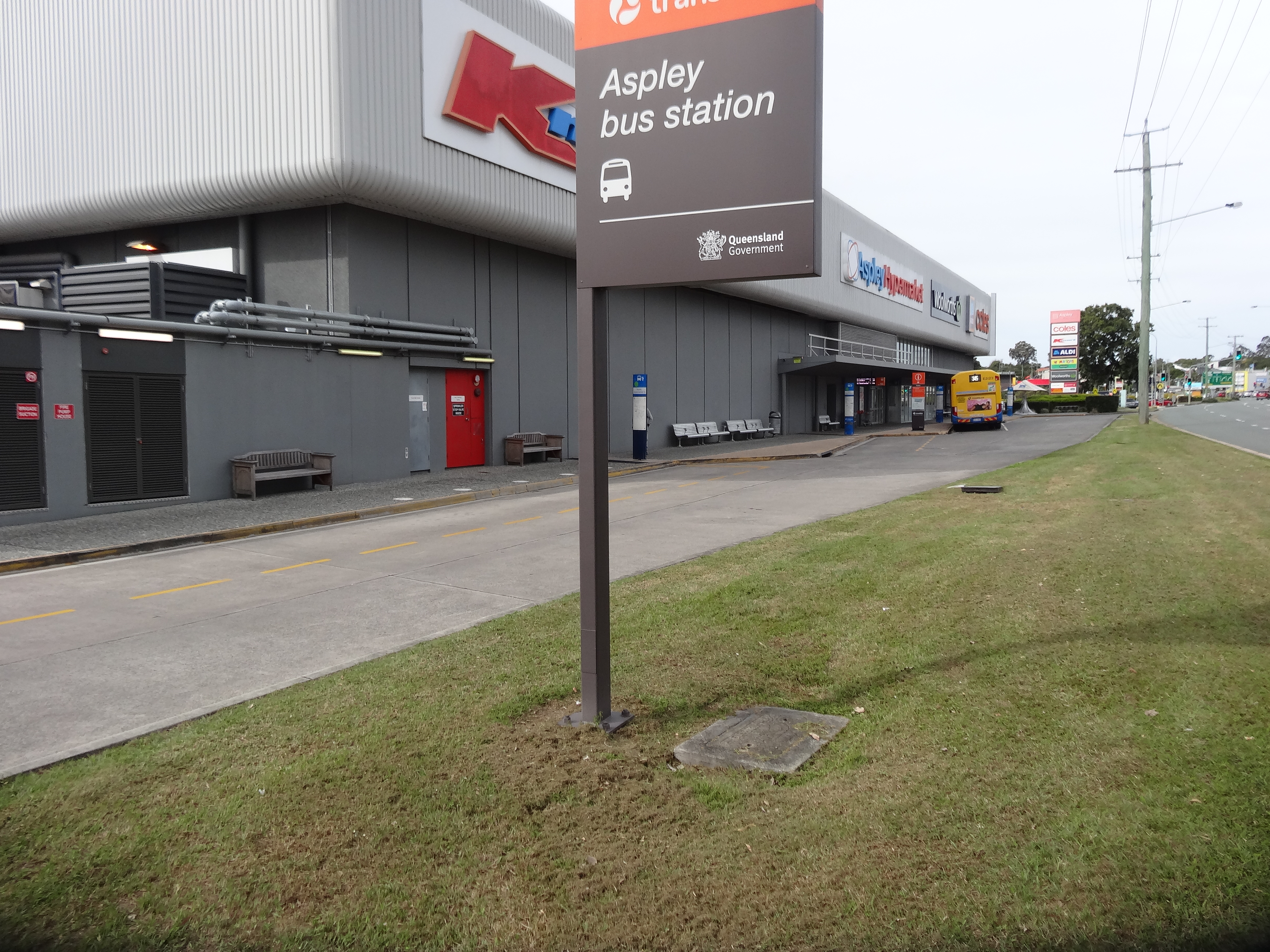
- Southward view in July 2023

General information
- Location: Albany Creek Road, Aspley
- Coordinates: 27.36331°S 153.012883°E
- Platforms: 1
- Bus routes: 6
- Bus stands: 4

Construction
- Parking: Park and ride
- Accessible: Yes

Other information
- Station code: 004194 (Platform A); 004193 (Platform B); 004175 (Platform C); 004174 (Platform D)
- Fare zone: Zone 2
- Website: Translink
Location

Aspley is a bus station operated by Translink. It opened in 1984 and is located at the Aspley Hypermarket in the Brisbane suburb of Aspley. It is a ground level station, featuring one side platform with four bus stands.

The station has been upgraded with enhanced waiting areas, an enclosed lounge, improved accessibility and real-time passenger information, as part of Translink's wider project for upgrading bus stations in South East Queensland.

An additional service has been added in 2008 which offers Personalised Public Transport (PPT). This service consists of a 'Black & White' MaxiTaxi servicing from the bus station, up Albany Creek Road, up Bangalow Street, down through Trouts Road, then back to the Hypermarket. This service runs approximately every 20 minutes during peak times morning and afternoon. The cost of this service is $1 and will pick up patrons anywhere along the route.

== Facilities ==
The interchange is made up of four bus stops. The interchange is a side platform, located beside the Aspley Hypermarket. Located at the interchange is toilets, vending machines, seats, bike rack and an air-conditioned waiting room.

== Stops and services ==
Aspley stop arrangement
Stop	Direction	Routes	Notes
A	Inbound	345	
B	Inbound	350	
C	Inbound	337, 346, 358	
D	Outbound	336, 346	
