= Garden City bus station =

Bus station in Brisbane, Australia

Garden City
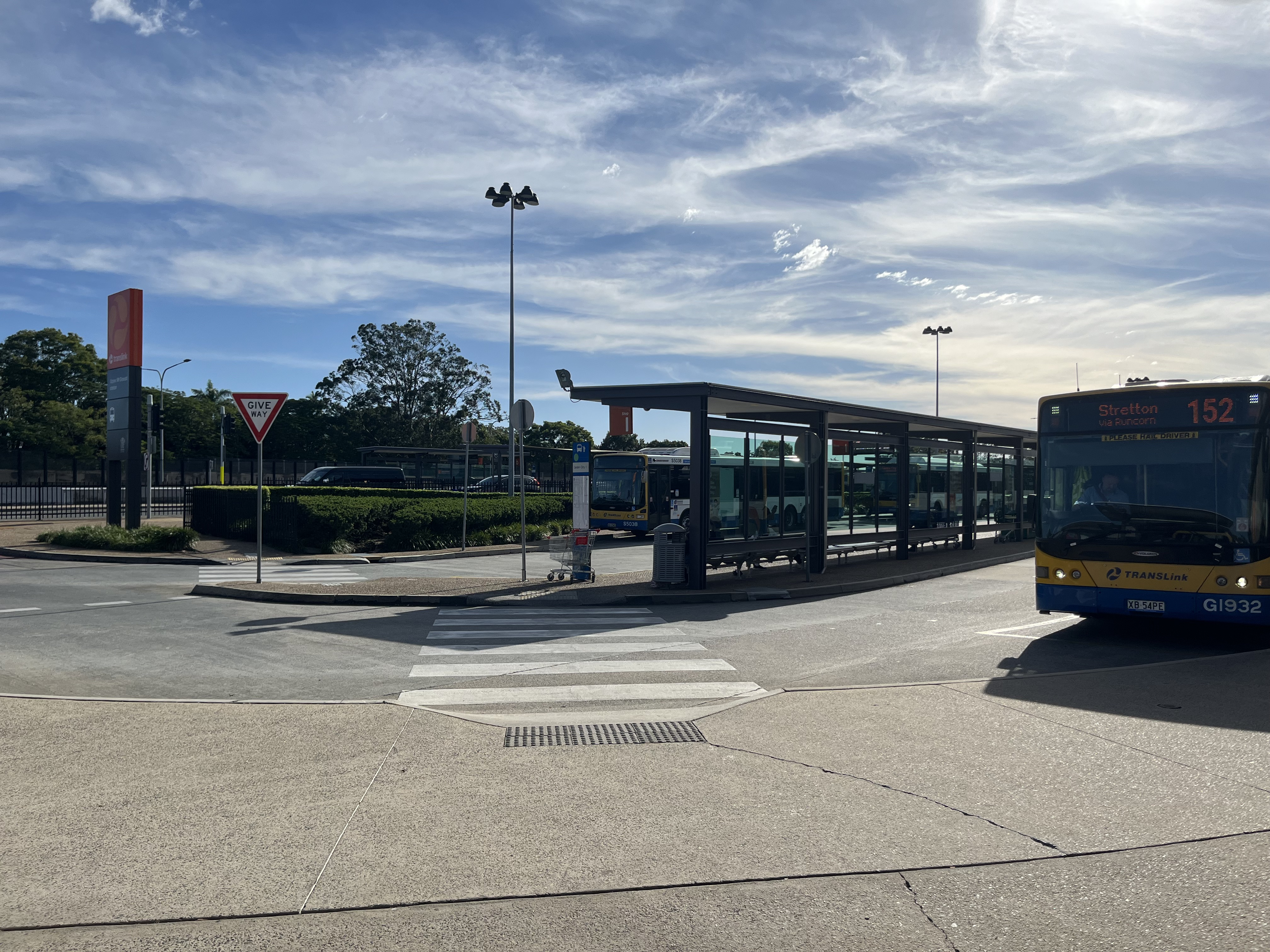

General information
- Location: Macgregor Street, Upper Mount Gravatt
- Coordinates: 27.563613°S 153.080572°E
- Owner: Department of Transport & Main Roads
- Operator: Transport for Brisbane
- Platforms: 4
- Bus stands: 14
- Connections: Upper Mount Gravatt busway station

Construction
- Accessible: Yes

Other information
- Website: Translink

History
- Opened: 22 April 1999
Location

Garden City is a bus station operated by Translink. It opened on 22 April 1999.

It became a junction station when the South East Busway opened with Upper Mount Gravatt busway station built below it.
