= Roma Street busway station =

Bus station in Brisbane, Australia

Roma Street
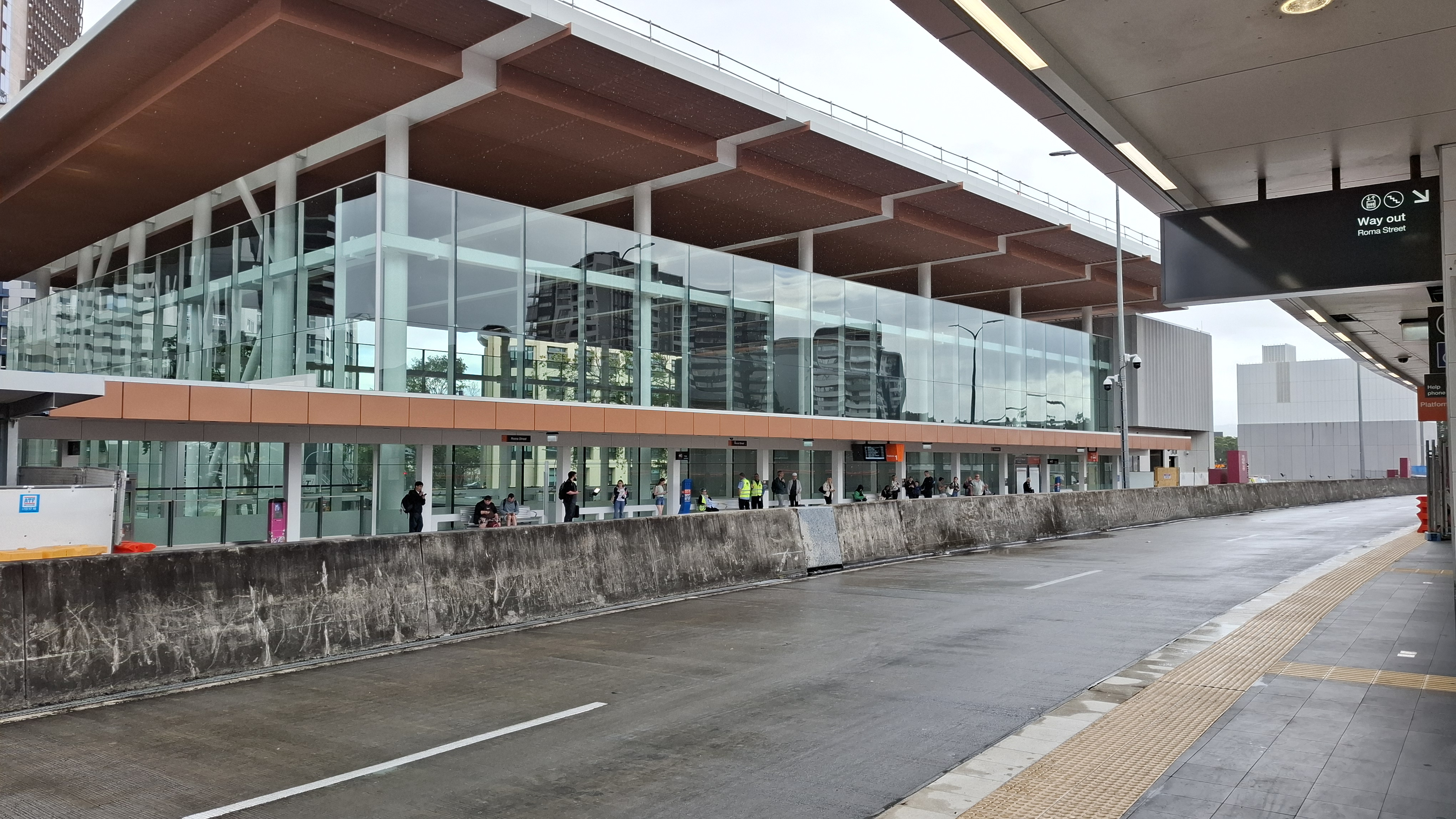
- Platform 1 in 2026

General information
- Location: Roma Street, Brisbane
- Coordinates: 27°27′58.29″S 153°01′07.03″E
- Owner: Department of Transport & Main Roads
- Operator: Transport for Brisbane
- Line: Northern
- Platforms: 2
- Bus routes: 18
- Connections: Roma Street railway station

Construction
- Accessible: Yes

Other information
- Station code: 010793 (platform 1); 010792 (platform 2)
- Website: Translink

History
- Opened: 19 May 2008

Services
Preceding station	Translink	Following station
King George Square Terminus	Northern Busway	Normanby towards Kedron Brook
Location

Roma Street is a busway station operated by Translink on the Northern Busway. It opened in 2008 and is located adjacent to Roma Street railway station, serving the Brisbane central business district. It is a ground level station, featuring two side platforms.

== History ==
The station opened on 19 May 2008 when the Northern Busway was extended from Normanby to King George Square.

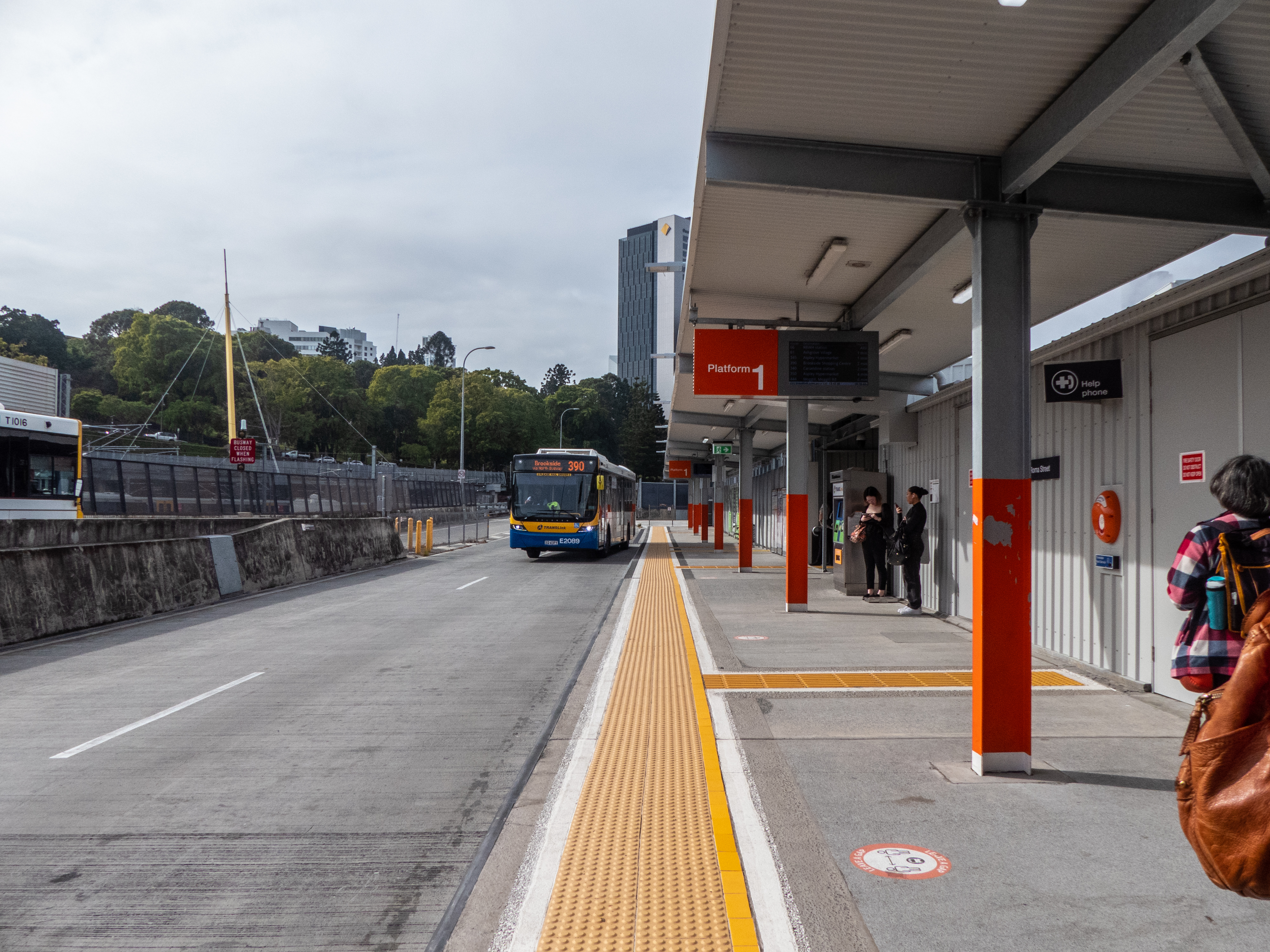
The temporary Platform 1 in 2021

The original Platform 1 was located inside the Brisbane Transit Centre. The centre was demolished in 2020 as part of the Cross River Rail project. In addition to the centre, the whole busway station was closed for 15 weeks to allow for the safe demolition. A temporary platform was set up nearby. for the remainder of the Cross River Rail project. The new Platform 1 was opened on 10 August 2026.

== Platforms and services ==
Roma Street platform arrangement
Platform	Line	Type	Destination		Notes
1	Northern Busway	Bus	Outbound	M1, M2, 61, 205, 222, 325, 330, 333, 340, 345, 350, 359, 385, 390, 444, 453, 454, 460	
2 (Note: Platform 2 is an island platform with the southern side used by inbound buses, while the northern side a rail platform that is currently closed. Both are technically platform 2, but the train platform does not have a number.)	Northern Busway	Bus	Inbound	M1, M2, 61, 205, 222, 325, 330, 333, 340, 345, 350, 359, 385, 390, 444, 453, 454, 460	
3	NSW Trainlink North Coast	Rail	Sydney Central		
4	Beenleigh	Rail	Beenleigh		
4	Gold Coast	Rail	Varsity Lakes		
5	Beenleigh	Rail	Beenleigh		
5	Cleveland	Rail	Cleveland		
6	Beenleigh	Rail	Beenleigh		
6	Ferny Grove	Rail	Ferny Grove		
6	Doomben	Rail	Doomben		
6	Airport	Rail	Domestic Airport		
6	Gold Coast	Rail	Varsity Lakes		
6	Shorncliffe	Rail	Shorncliffe		
7	Ferny Grove	Rail	Ferny Grove		
7	Caboolture	Rail	Caboolture		
7	Doomben	Rail	Doomben		
7	Airport	Rail	Domestic Airport		
7	Shorncliffe	Rail	Shorncliffe		
7	Sunshine Coast	Rail	Nambour or Gympie North		
8	Ipswich/Rosewood	Rail	Ipswich or Rosewood		
8	Springfield	Rail	Springfield		
9	Caboolture	Rail	Caboolture		
9	Redcliffe Peninsula	Rail	Kippa-Ring		
9	Sunshine Coast	Rail	Nambour or Gympie North		
10	Spirit of Queensland	Rail	Cairns		Long-distance services
10	Spirit of the Outback	Rail	Longreach		Long-distance services
10	Tilt Train	Rail	Bundaberg or Rockhampton		Long-distance services
10	The Westlander	Rail	Charleville		Long-distance services
11	Under construction for Cross River Rail				
12	Under construction for Cross River Rail				

== Facilities ==
The station is located adjacent to Roma Street railway station.
