= BCC-RAPID =

Bus priority and passenger information system used in Brisbane

Brisbane City Council - Realtime Advanced Priority and Information Delivery (BCC-RAPID) is a bus priority and passenger information system developed by Brisbane City Council that is in use on the South-East and Inner-Northern, Northern and Eastern Brisbane busways. It aims to improve road capacity by encouraging people to use buses.

RAPID is built upon Brisbane City Council's BLISS ITS platform and uses existing traffic signal infrastructure to track the buses and to lower communications costs.

RAPID uses detector loops in the road and transponders on buses to track the location of buses on the road and busway network. The data collected is used in a complex mathematical formula to predict the arrival time of buses at all busway stations and selected stops on the suburban network. The predicted arrival times are displayed on electronic signs for the information of people waiting at these stops.

Operations staff are able to use the system to identify the precise location of buses within the road network. Specifically the system displays bus numbers, route numbers, driver numbers, how early or late a bus is, where it originated and where it will terminate.

The system also has the ability, when configured, to provide traffic light priority to buses if they are running late. This is possible because the same detection loops in the road network are used to control the traffic lights throughout the city.

The system has had significant problems, with information displays frequently being inaccurate, and buses simply not arriving, or their information simply disappearing from the screens.
