= Northern Busway, Brisbane =

Bus-only road in Brisbane, Australia

Northern Busway

Overview
- System: Translink
- Operator: Transport for Brisbane
- Status: Open
- Began service: 23 February 2004

Route
- Start: King George Square
- Via: Gympie Road
- End: Kedron Brook
- Stations: 10 (8 busway stations) (2 bus stops)

The Northern Busway is a bus-only road running north from the Brisbane central business district to the Royal Brisbane and Women's Hospital in Queensland, Australia.

== History ==
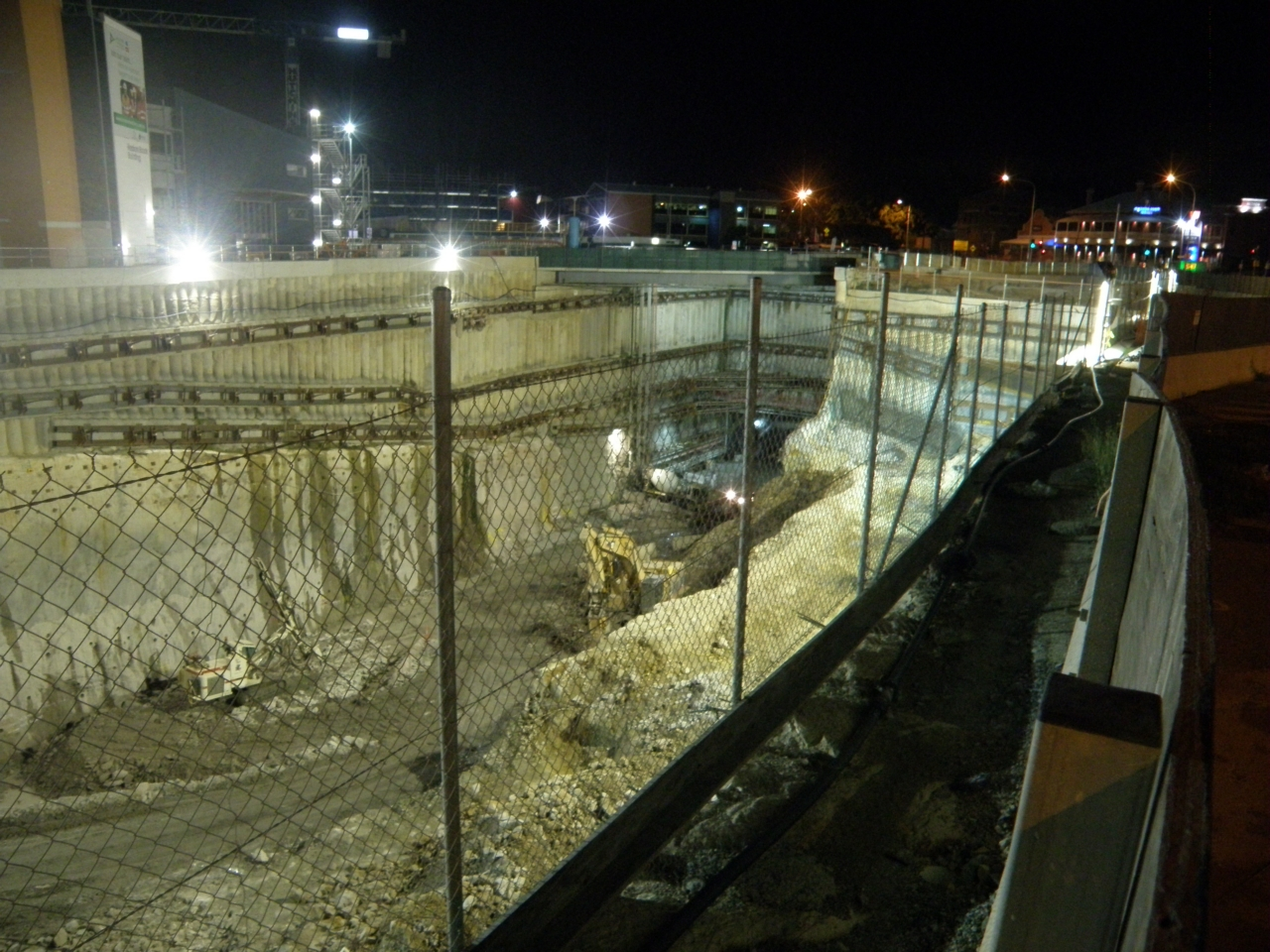
Tunneling works for the Airport Link project

The first section of the Northern Busway, from the intersection of Roma Street to Herston, opened on 23 February 2004 with only one station, QUT Kelvin Grove. On 14 December 2005, two new stations, Normanby and Royal Children's Hospital, were opened on the existing section.

The second section of the Northern Busway, also known as the Inner Northern Busway, officially opened on 19 May 2008. This section connects the first section of the Northern Busway to the South East Busway with stations at King George Square and Roma Street. To make room for the Inner Northern Busway, the lower floors of King George Square carpark were removed, and one rail platform at Roma Street railway station was removed.

In October 2007, an alliance of Abigroup and SMEC Holdings were selected to build the 1.2 kilometre Royal Children's Hospital to Windsor section with a new station at Royal Brisbane & Women's Hospital. This opened on 3 August 2009. On 18 June 2012, the Windsor to Kedron section opened.

=== Extension to Bracken Ridge ===
The final stage of the busway is planned to be built from Kedron to Bracken Ridge. A series of draft alignments in order to identify the corridor for preservation have been released, however no final route has been selected. Provisions for this extension were pre-built at the Kedron Portal of the Busway.

In 2016, the Newman Government had indicated an intention to revisit the alignment for this project. Their primary points of departure from the policy of the previous government were a preference not to build the full busway option, nor to take the busway all the way to The Prince Charles Hospital. These changes were predicated on the perceived high expense of the previously published preferred options. The Newman government's stated preference was for bus or transit lane level priority along the highly congested Gympie Road corridor.

In August 2024, it was announced Brisbane Metro would be extended using the Northern Transitway to Chermside.

== Stations ==
Legend: Adjacent to a train station

List of Northern Busway, Brisbane stations
Station	Image	Suburb	Opened	Grade
King George Square	Underground busway station	Brisbane CBD	19 May 2008	Underground
Roma Street	Busway station	Brisbane CBD	19 May 2008	Elevated
Normanby	Busway station	Kelvin Grove	14 December 2005	Below ground
QUT Kelvin Grove	Busway station	Kelvin Grove	23 February 2004	Ground
Herston	Busway station	Herston	14 December 2005	Ground
RBWH	Busway station	Herston	3 August 2009	Elevated
Lutwyche		Lutwyche	18 June 2012	Ground
Kedron Brook		Kedron	18 June 2012	Ground

== Services ==
All services on the busway are operated by Transport for Brisbane.

== Facilities ==
Real time passenger information is displayed at each station, with fixed LED signs suspended above each platform. These signs present four lines of real-time estimated bus departure times, with data provided by Brisbane City Council's RAPID system.

== See also ==
- Transport in Brisbane
