= Kedron Brook busway station =

Bus station in Brisbane, Australia

Kedron Brook

General information
- Location: Gympie Road, Kedron
- Coordinates: 27.415024°S 153.035423°E
- Owner: Department of Transport & Main Roads
- Operator: Transport for Brisbane
- Line: Northern
- Platforms: 3 (2 side, 1 local)
- Bus routes: 5

Construction
- Structure type: Below ground
- Accessible: Yes

Other information
- Station code: 011270 (platform 1); 011269 (platform 2)
- Fare zone: go card 1/2
- Website: Translink

History
- Opened: 18 June 2012

Services
Preceding station	Translink	Following station
Lutwyche towards King George Square	Northern Busway	Terminus
Location

Kedron Brook is a busway station operated by Translink on the Northern Busway. It opened in 2012 and serves the Brisbane suburb of Kedron. It is a ground level station, featuring two side platforms and one local bus stop.

== Platforms and services ==
Kedron Brook platform arrangement
Platform	Line	Direction	Routes	Notes
1	Northern Busway	Inbound	77, 332, 333, 340,	
2	Northern Busway	Outbound	77, 332, 333, 340,	
3	Northern Busway	West	369	Local stop

The station also features a bike rack and drop off facilities.
