= Busways in Brisbane =

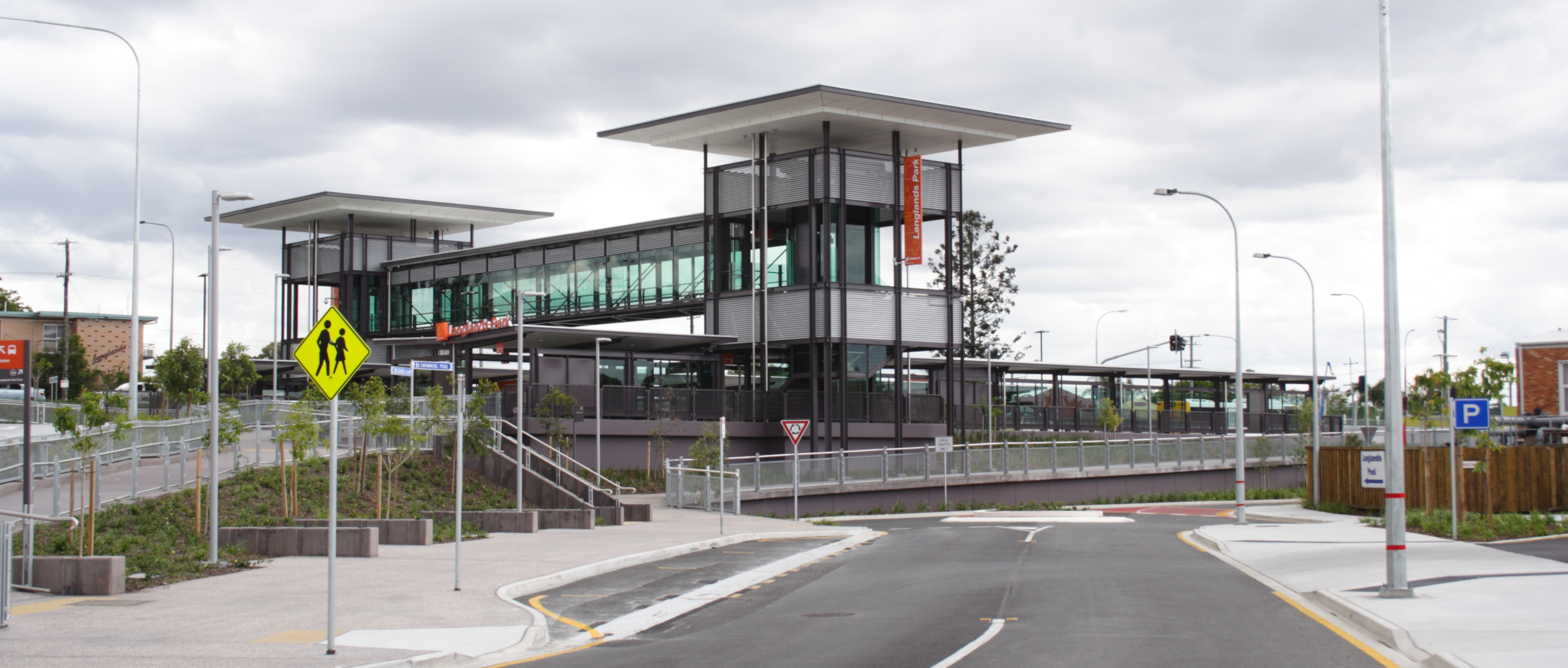
Langlands Park busway station

The Brisbane Busway network is a bus rapid transit network in Brisbane, Australia. The network comprises grade-separated bus-only corridors, complementing the Queensland Rail Citytrain network. Management of the busway network is the responsibility of Translink as coordinator of South East Queensland's integrated public transport system.

The network currently consists of the South East Busway, Northern Busway and Eastern Busway. The combined network is the largest adoption of busways as a form of public transport in Australia. Patronage has grown to 70 million passengers annually, resulting in reduced traffic congestion and air pollution for the city.

== Network ==
The network consists of three corridors. The corridors include the bus station at Queen Street, as well as bus stops at Dutton Park Place, Federation Street and Truro Street. As a result, the network comprises 27 busway stations, 1 bus station and 3 bus stops.

Corridor	Terminus #1	Terminus #2	Stations
South East Busway	King George Square busway station	Springwood busway station	14
Northern Busway	King George Square busway station	Kedron Brook busway station	10
Eastern Busway	UQ Lakes busway station	Langlands Park busway station	7

== Capacity ==
In peak hour, 294 buses per hour (one way) (1 every 12 seconds) passed the busway network's busiest point (a section of the South East Busway north of Woolloongabba station) in 2007, a number estimated to be approaching the busway's absolute maximum vehicle capacity using the current bus fleet.

== Facilities ==
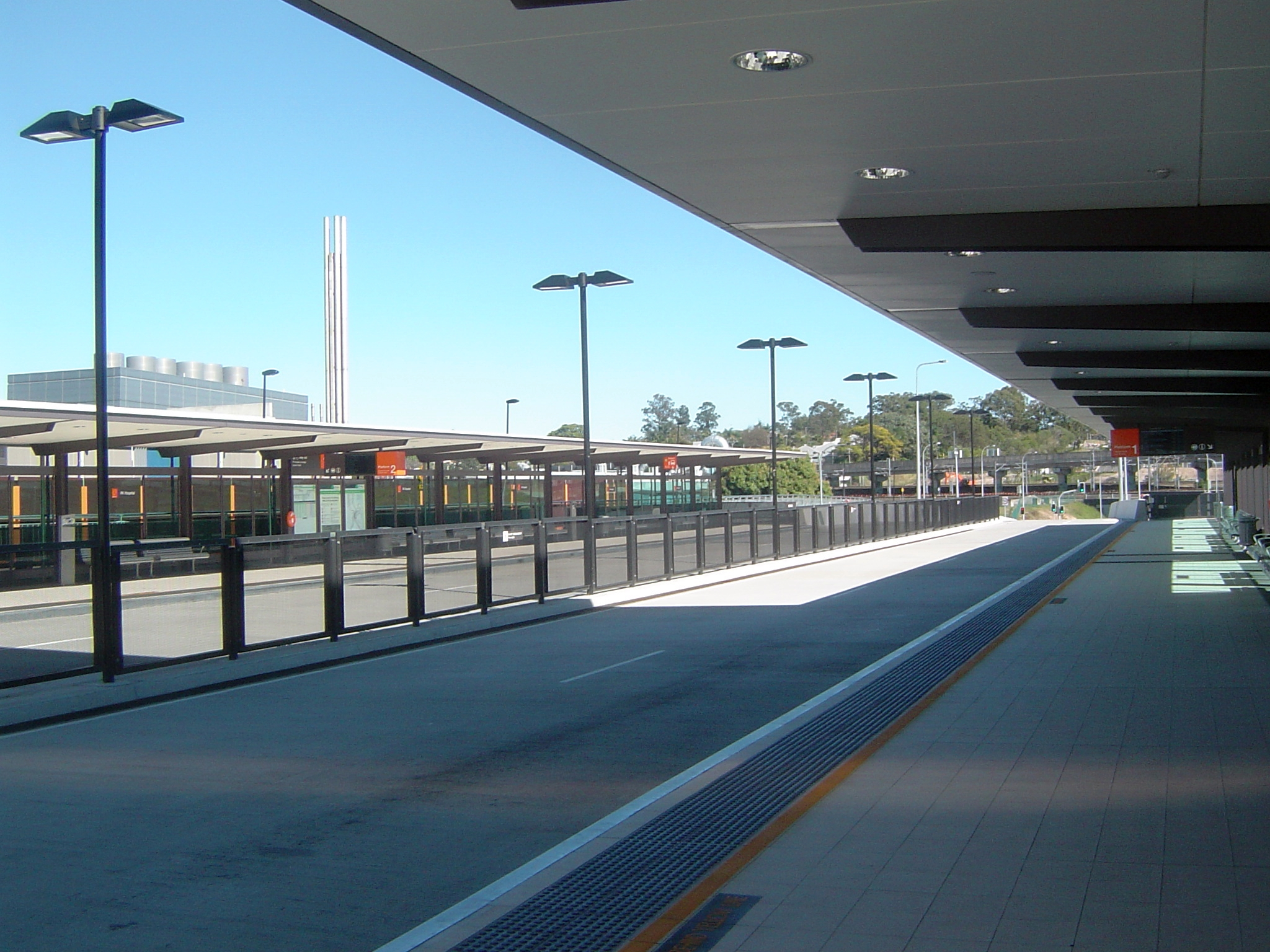
PA Hospital busway station

Stations on the Brisbane busway network usually comprise two platforms. Most stations are labelled Platform 1 for services inbound to the city, and Platform 2 for services outbound from the city.

The platforms at Boggo Road, Buranda, Roma Street and South Bank are aligned with the respective train stations:

- Boggo Road allocates 3 for outbound, 4 for inbound.
- Buranda allocates 3 for outbound, 4 for inbound.
- Roma Street allocates 1 for outbound, 2 for inbound.
- South Bank allocates 4 for outbound, 5 for inbound.

Bus departure information is displayed at each station, with fixed LED / LCD displays suspended above each platform. These signs present 5 to 7 lines of scheduled bus departure times, with data provided by Brisbane City Council's RAPID system. Busway stations contain full disabled accessibility, passenger seating, 24-hour CCTV cameras, next services audio prompt and emergency help point buttons. Bicycle access and storage is provided at most stations, as are drinking fountains and go card fare machines. Public art may be found in some busway stations, tunnels and walls.

As of 2026, the city has three busways, spanning 29 kilometres and 20 tunnels.

== Services ==
Transport for Brisbane operate services across the entire network, while Clarks Logan City Bus Service operate services along the full length of the South East Busway (apart from Queen Street Mall bus station and Woolloongabba busway station) and Mt Gravatt Bus Service and Transdev Queensland services use the southern part of the South East Busway.

== Planning ==
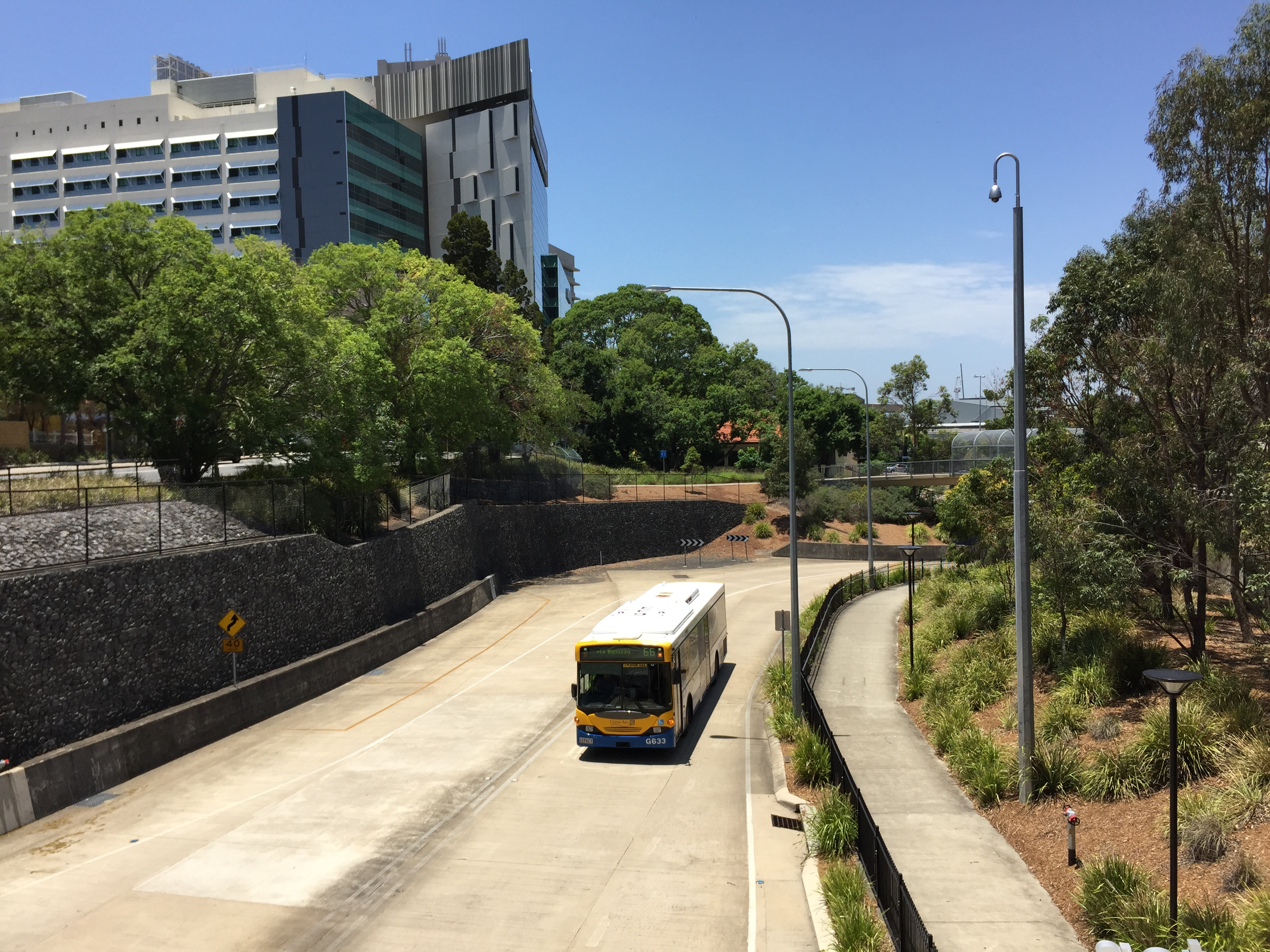
Northern Busway near Herston busway station

The South East Queensland Integrated Regional Transport Plan 1997 recommended a 75 km, 65-station network of busways to be constructed in Brisbane in order to provide a rapid public transport system to areas not served by the existing Queensland Rail Citytrain network. A busway system was recommended over an expansion of the Queensland Rail network given the existing strong role of buses in the regional transport system and its cost effectiveness compared with constructing rail lines. It was envisaged that feeder buses would serve both busway and rail stations, allowing buses to service low-density communities while bypassing peak hour traffic congestion by using the busways where appropriate.

This recommendation built upon the Brisbane City Council's earlier Brisbane Busway Plan which was broadened into the SEQ Regional Busway Network plan. A network of five busways was planned which, inter alia, would improve the operation of the bus fleet while reducing maintenance and running costs.

== Construction ==
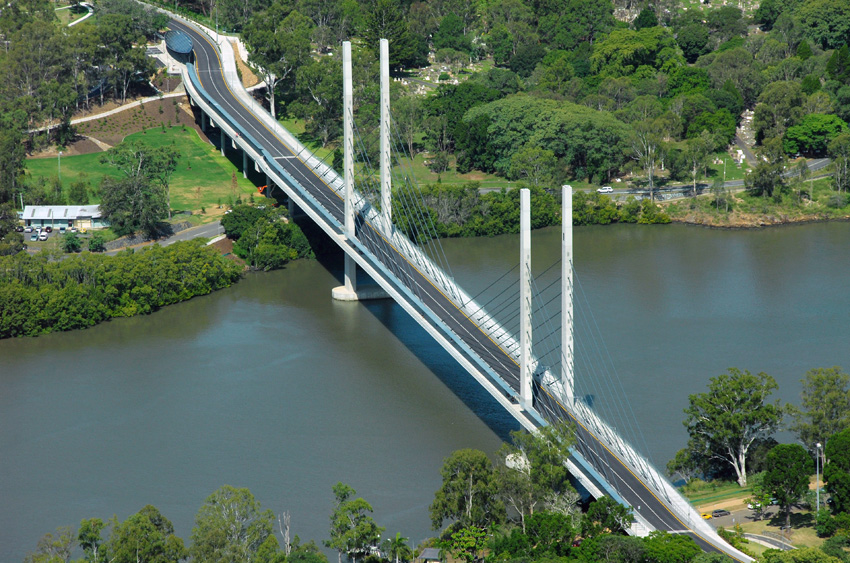
Eleanor Schonell Bridge

In August 1996, the Queensland Government approved the South East Transit Project which began planning and constructing the South East Busway between the Brisbane central business district and Eight Mile Plains. The first section of the busway, between the CBD and Woolloongabba, opened in September 2000 to coincide with the first match of the Olympic Games Football Tournament at the Gabba. The second section between Woolloongabba and Eight Mile Plains opened on 30 April 2001 at a final cost of over $600 million.

Planning for the construction of the Northern Busway began soon after the success of the South East Busway was demonstrated by increasing bus commuter statistics. The first section, from Roma Street in the CBD to Herston, was opened in February 2004 at a cost of $135 million. The second section, originally named the Inner Northern Busway, was opened in May 2008 at a cost of $333 million and linked the Northern Busway to the South East Busway through tunnels under the Brisbane CBD and a new station underneath King George Square. A further extension from Herston to Windsor, costing $198 million opened in June 2009. In June 2012, construction of a further extension from Windsor to Kedron opened, costing $444 million.

In 2007 construction began on the first stage of the Eastern Busway. The first stage was completed in August 2009, costing $366 million and involving the construction of the Eleanor Schonell Bridge and Australia's longest busway tunnel underneath the old Boggo Road Gaol. A 1 km extension of the Eastern Busway from Buranda to Main Avenue, Coorparoo commenced in August 2009 and was completed in August 2011 at a cost of $466 million.

In 2021, construction began on an extension of the South East Busway to Springwood Bus Station, including a new station at Rochedale. Work was completed in February 2025, with the section of the busway opening on the 12 May 2025.

== Development ==
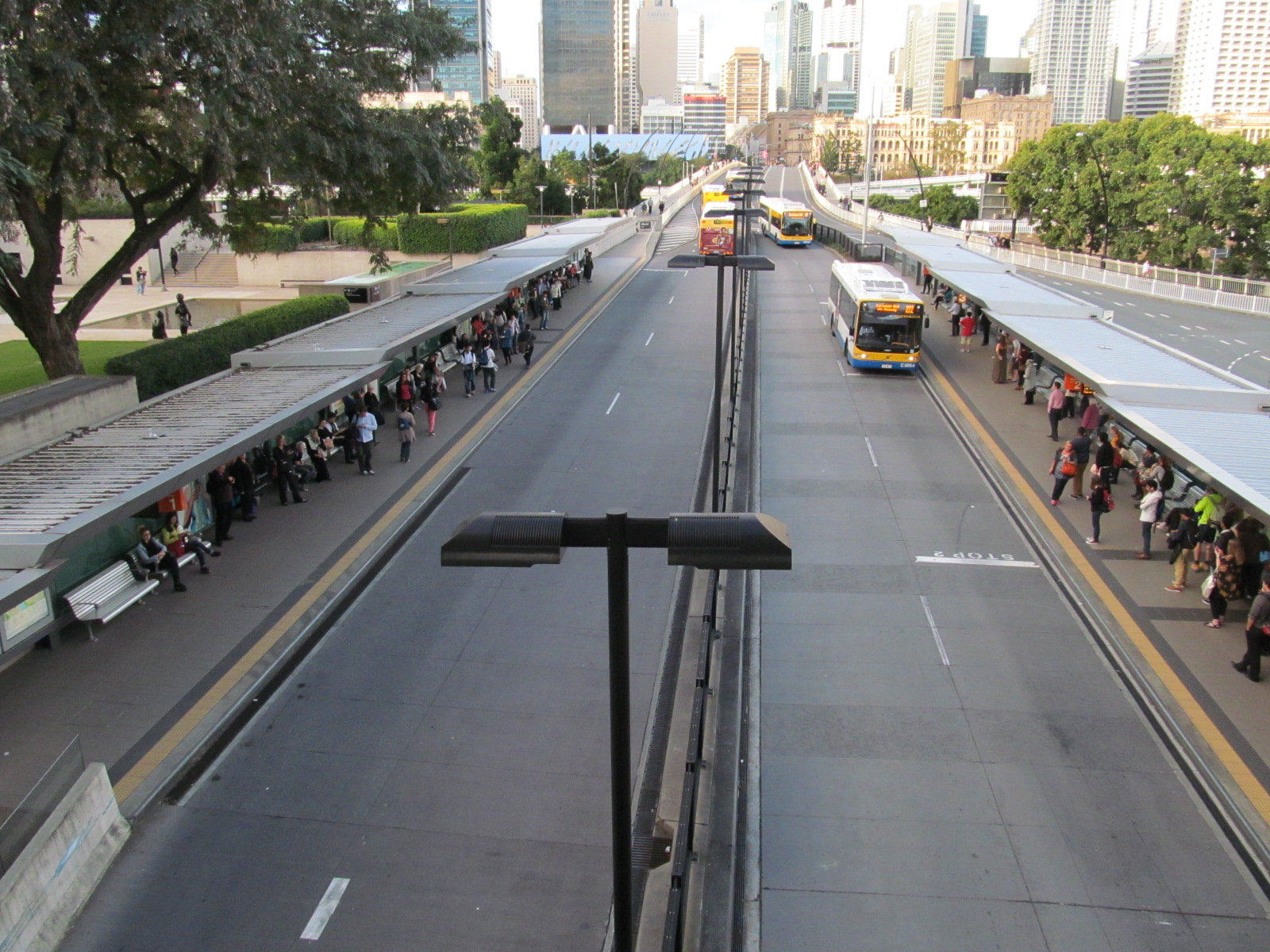
Cultural Centre busway station

Plans exist to extend the Northern Busway from Kedron to Bracken Ridge and the Eastern Busway from Main Avenue, Coorparoo to Capalaba via Old Cleveland Road.

In 2011, the Brisbane City Council conducted a $2 million, 18-month feasibility study into constructing a bus-only bridge from the Cultural Centre busway station, linking to a busway tunnel travelling underneath the CBD and ending in Fortitude Valley. This was to relieve bus congestion on the CBD streets and the Victoria Bridge (caused by traffic lights operating at both ends of the bridge, seriously inhibiting the clearance of buses from the Cultural Centre busway station in peak hour.

As of 2024, as part of the Daisy Hill to Logan Motorway upgrade of the Pacific Motorway there are plans to extend the South East Busway to the Logan Hyperdome with new stations at Loganlea and Chatswood.

== Criticism ==
Brisbane's busways were designed to allow buses to service low-density suburbs and bypass peak hour congestion on major roads, linking with the rail network to improve public transport connectivity. This allows a balance between the convenience of localised bus services with the efficiency of medium haul commuter transport to the city's activity centres in a highly radial city like Brisbane.

However, it can be argued that a system designed like this increases the likelihood of dead running and underuse of available capacity. Dead running occurs on any highly peak-oriented radial bus or rail system where additional peak direction buses are added into the schedule or operated as "rocket" express routes. After or before their run in the peak direction the buses generally run empty, whether to head out for another run, back to the depot or to be positioned prior to starting another run (such as, in the afternoon peak). On the busways many of these dead running vehicles are perceived to be underused and to contribute to congestion. The counterargument to this is that this issue is related more to the dominance of the CBD as the largest employment centre within the region and that to change this requires a shift to forced interchanging for many people, likely reducing the attractiveness of the service. It is also true that these routes generally, but not always, bypass the most congested sections of the busway network by using alternative approaches to the city such as the Captain Cook Bridge or Water Street. The perceived under-use of available capacity is where less than full services travel on the busway. It is argued that this is caused by low patronage on the off-busway portion of many suburban routes. This has been argued to lead to busway route duplication where these services then enter a busway corridor and continue on into the inner city without being full, and to increased busway vehicular congestion and unnecessary air pollution created from vehicle emissions without a correspondingly high number of passengers. The counterargument to this is that by running these buses on the busway they provide additional available capacity to the often overcrowded spine services and that that forced interchange onto overcrowded spine services would reduce the attractiveness of bus as a travel option.

The decision not to connect the Legacy Way tunnel to the Northern Busway to provide for shorter travel times from the western suburbs to the city (via the Inner City Bypass) was also criticised as short-sighted given the lack of planned busway construction to those suburbs.

== See also ==
- Brisbane Metro
- Bus transport in Queensland
- Transport in Brisbane
