= King George Square busway station =

Bus station in Brisbane, Australia

King George Square
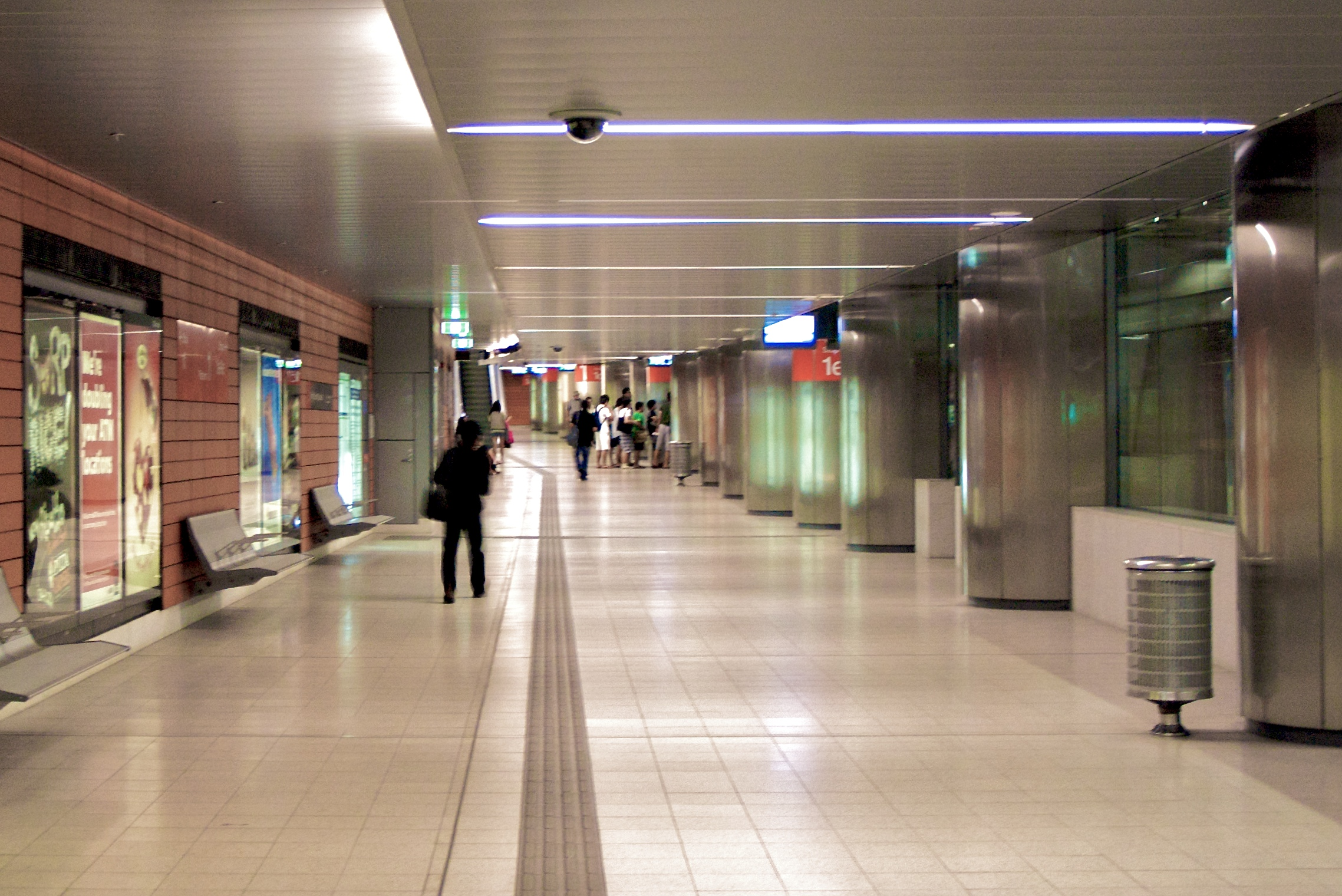

General information
- Location: King George Square, Brisbane
- Coordinates: 27.468603°S 153.024136°E
- Owner: Department of Transport & Main Roads
- Operator: Transport for Brisbane
- Lines: Northern; South East
- Platforms: 2
- Bus stands: 6

Construction
- Structure type: Underground
- Cycle facilities: King George Square Cycle Centre
- Accessible: Yes

Other information
- Station code: 010781 (platform 1A); 010783 (platform 1B); 010785 (platform 1C); 010780 (platform 2A); 010782 (platform 2B); 010784 (platform 2C)
- Website: Translink

History
- Opened: 19 May 2008

Services
Preceding station	Translink	Following station
Terminus	South East Busway	Cultural Centre towards Springwood
Terminus	Northern Busway	Roma Street towards Kedron Brook
Location

King George Square is a busway station operated by Translink on the Northern Busway and the South East Busway. It opened in 2008 and is located beneath King George Square, serving the Brisbane central business district. It is an underground station, featuring two side platforms with six bus stands.

== History ==
Construction of the King George Square busway station was announced in March 2005. Construction commenced in early 2006 and the station opened on 19 May 2008 when the Northern Busway was extended from Normanby. The lower two levels of the King George Square Car Park were demolished to make way for the station. The heritage-listed Wheat Creek Culvert (built in 1861) which ran from under King George Square out into Adelaide Street was also demolished. A short segment of the culvert has been preserved as a display in the bus station.

A bus tunnel had been constructed under Albert Street to link the station with Queen Street bus station. The bus tunnel replaced one of the tunnel exit ramps to the Queen Street bus station on Albert Street (see photo below). As part of construction, the space in Albert Street above the new tunnel has been converted into a pedestrian mall, extending the Queen Street Mall.

In conjunction with the building of the station, there was a national design competition for the redevelopment of King George Square. The winning entry was entitled A Space in Transition by UrbisJHD. Construction of the Square was completed in October 2009. The re-design of the square and its busway entrances attracted criticism from professional urban designers and the public.

When the station originally opened, it included a Transport Information Centre at the Ann Street entrance, this however was closed on 29 September 2012.

The station was renamed "City Hall / King George Square" on 28 January 2025, ahead of an eventual renaming to "City Hall". This renaming better reflects the neighbouring City Hall, and aligns with other major Australian cities' naming conventions.

Between 2021 and 2025, a new tunnel was dug between the busway station and Victoria Bridge for the Brisbane Metro project. The new tunnel opened on 29 September 2025.

== Platforms and services ==
King George Square platform arrangement
Platform	Stop	Line	Direction	Routes	Notes
1	1A	Northern Busway; South East Busway	Outbound (to Roma Street)	333, 340	
1	1B	Northern Busway; South East Busway	Outbound (to Roma Street)	222, 444	
1	1C	Northern Busway; South East Busway	Outbound (to Roma Street)	M1, M2	
2	2A	Northern Busway; South East Busway	Outbound (to Cultural Centre)	M1, M2	
2	2B	Northern Busway; South East Busway	Outbound (to Cultural Centre)	61, 222	
2	2C	Northern Busway; South East Busway	Outbound (to Cultural Centre)	333, 340, 444	

== Facilities ==
King George Square busway station has 12 stops on two platforms (6 stops each labelled 1A-1C and 2A-2C). Passengers wait behind automatic doors at allocated stops rather than hailing buses. Passengers enter the station from either Ann or Adelaide Streets and then select the desired platform via an underground concourse at each end. The station also features a bike station, cycle2city, located on the Ann Street Concourse. However, bicycles are not allowed on the station's platforms.

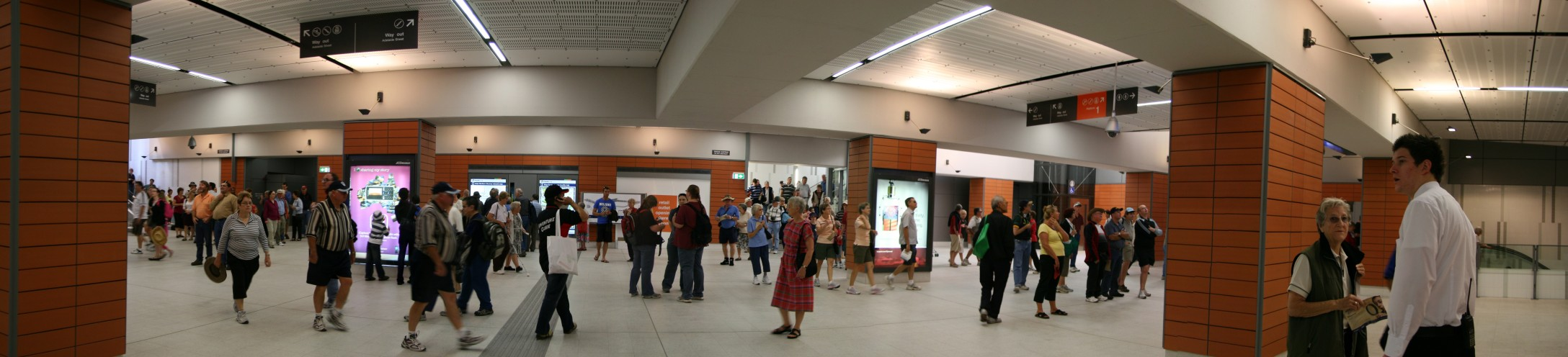
Station concourse

== Gallery ==
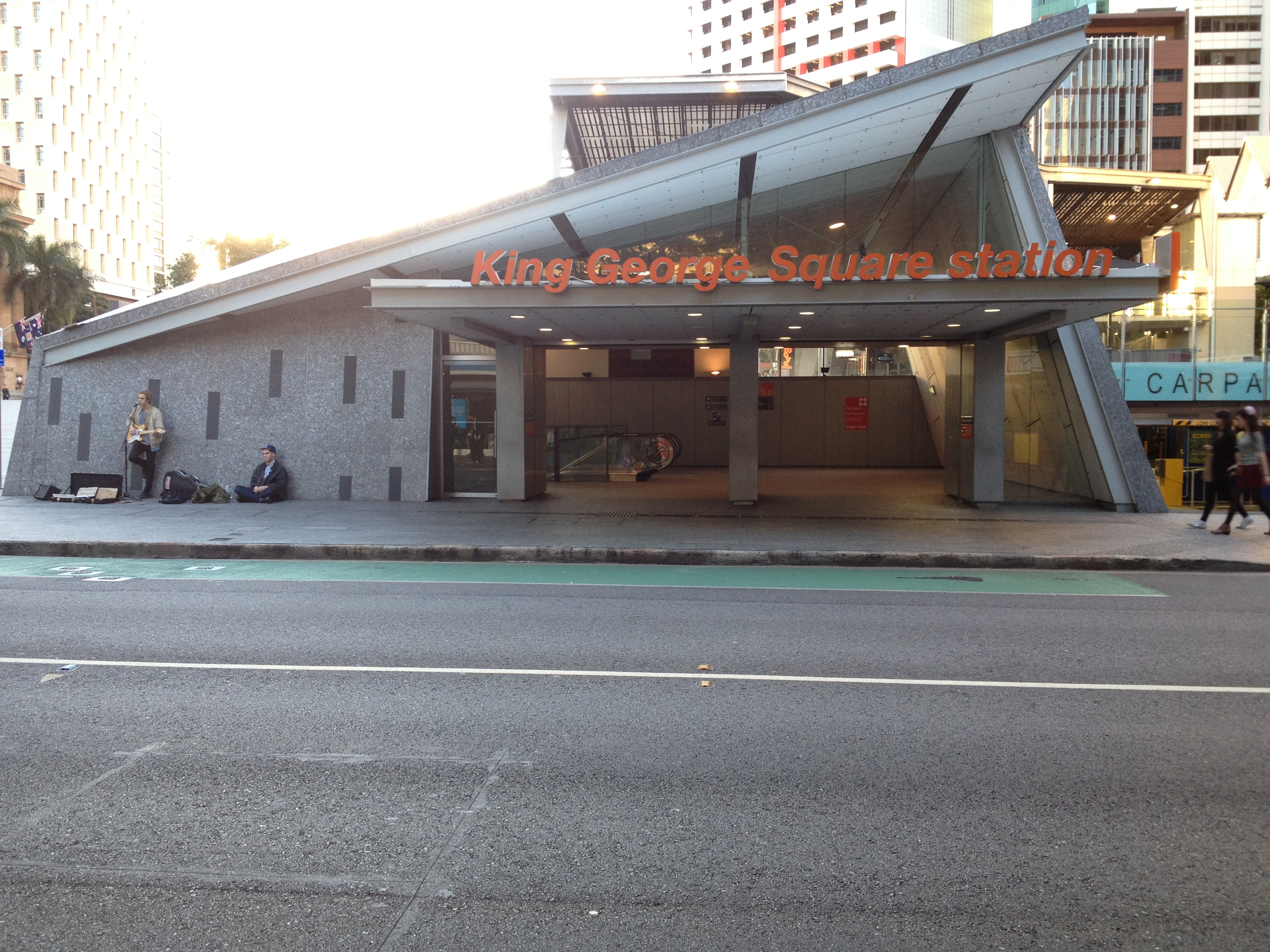
Adelaide Street entrance to the busway

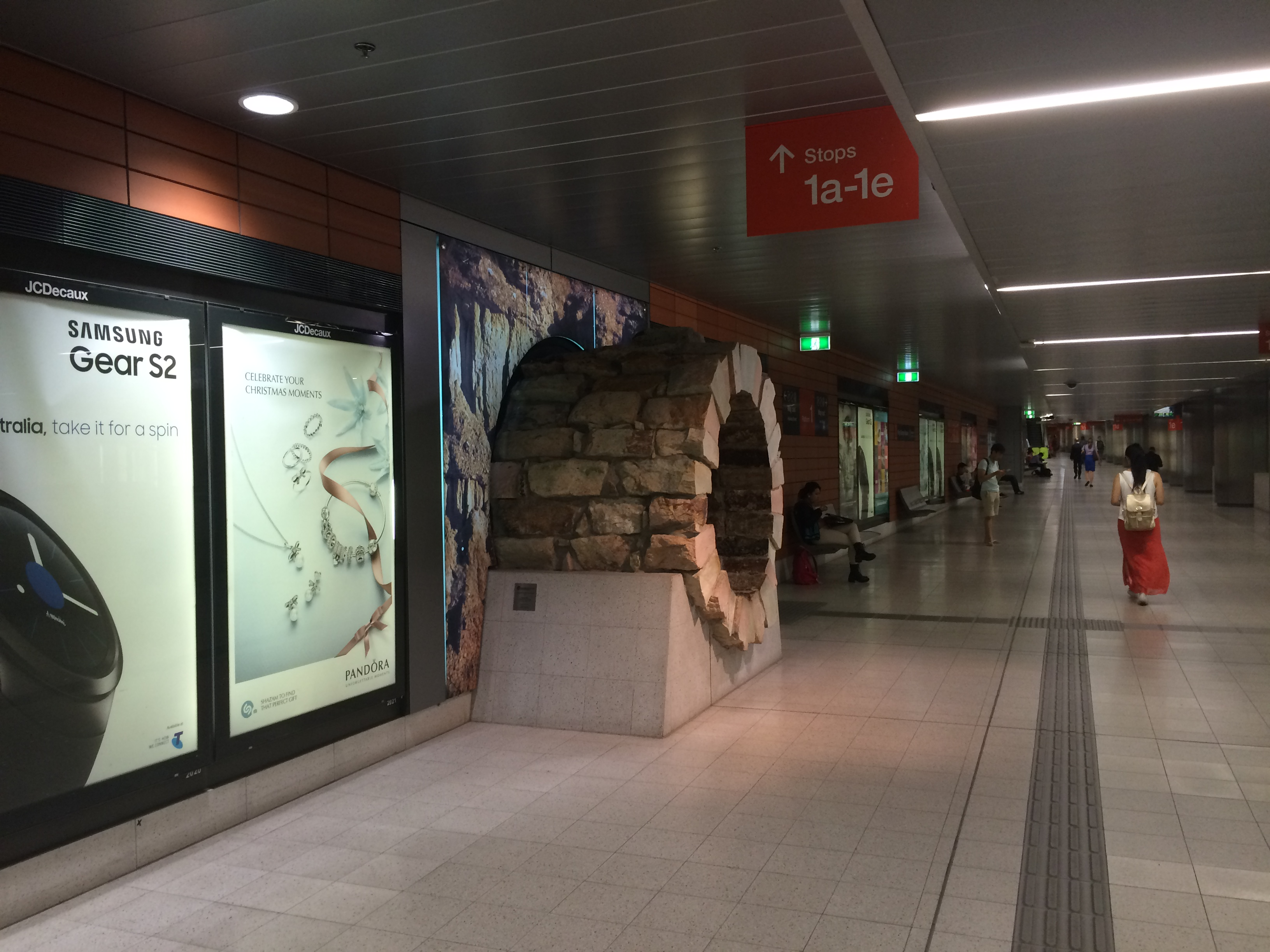
Segment of the Wheat Creek Culvert on display at the King George Square busway station, 2015

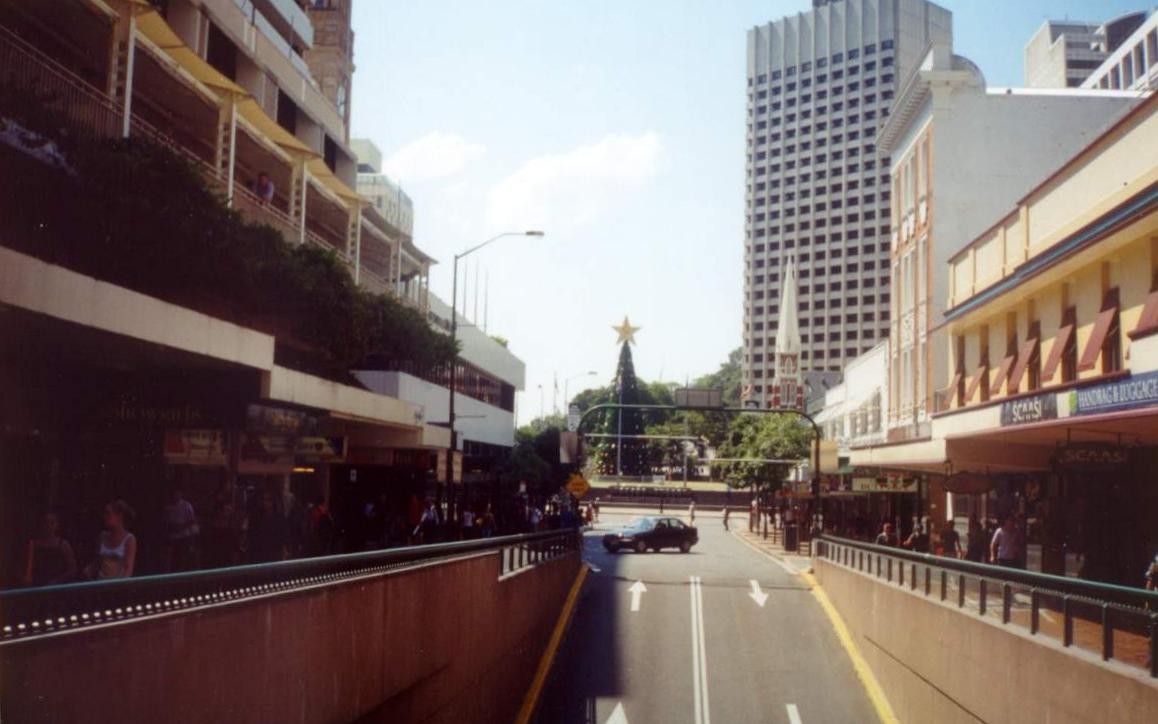
The former Albert Street / King George Square exit from the Queen Street bus station, which has been converted into a tunnel to connect Queen Street with King George Square busway station

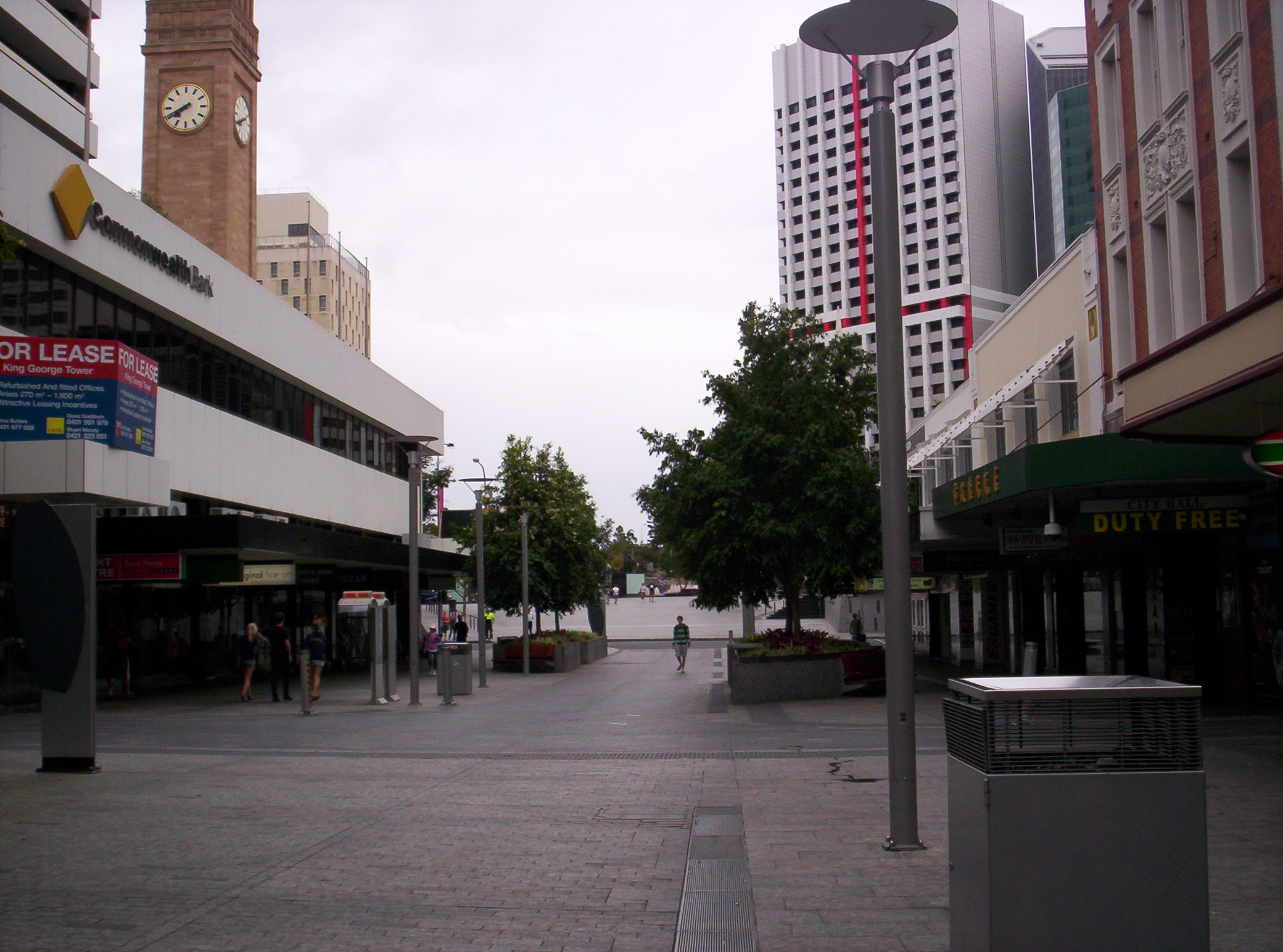
Albert Street, showing the now covered area of the bus tunnel leading to the King George Square busway station

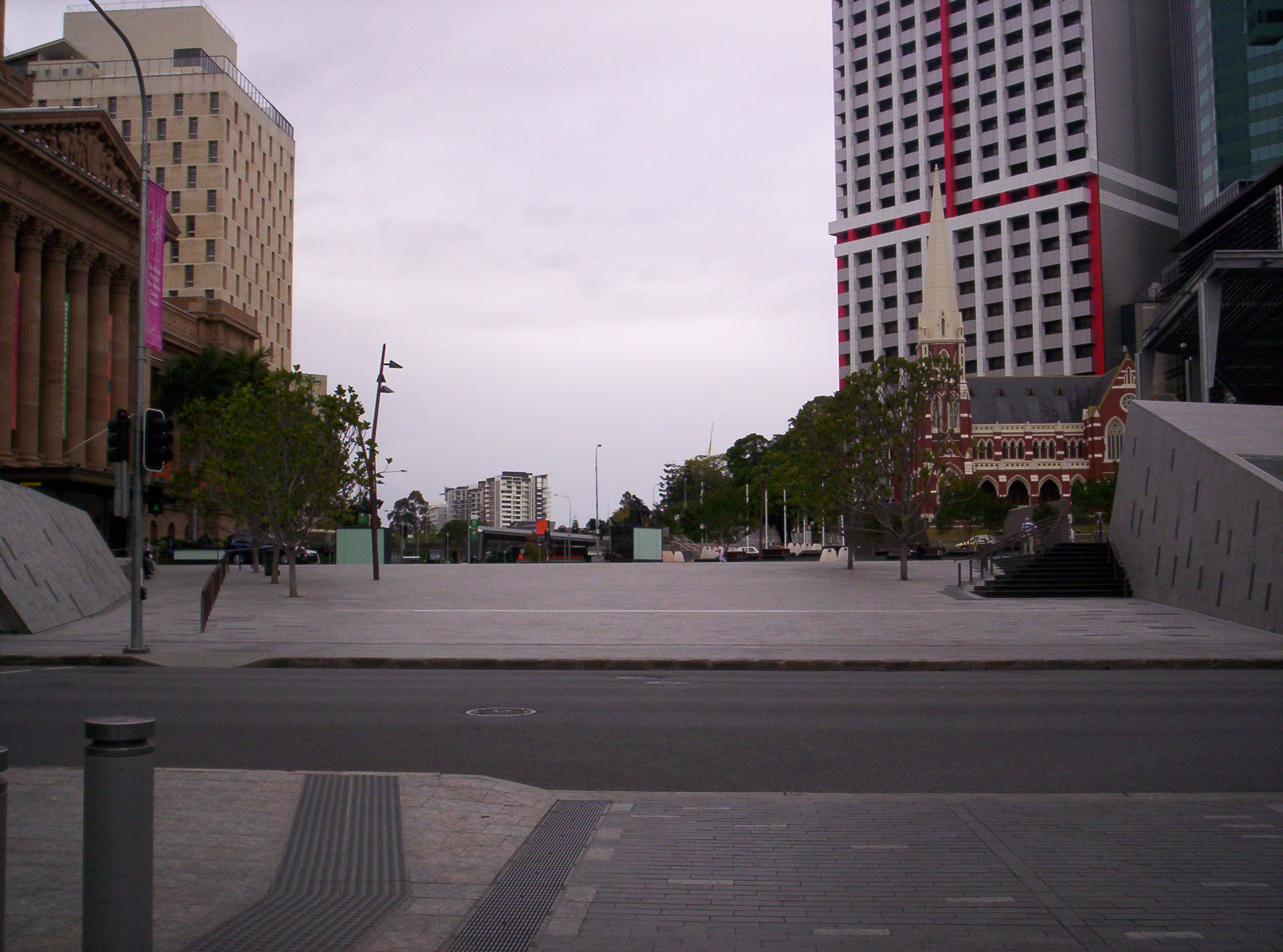
King George Square and the two Adelaide Street busway station entrances (shown at each side of the photo)
