= Department of Transport and Main Roads =

State transport department of the Queensland Government

Department overview
- Formed: April 2009
- Preceding agencies: Department of Main Roads; Queensland Transport
- Jurisdiction: Queensland
- Headquarters: Brisbane
- Employees: 11,000+
- Minister responsible: Brent Mickelberg, Minister for Transport and Main Roads
- Department executive: Sally Stannard, Director-General
- Website: tmr.qld.gov.au

Queensland roads

The Department of Transport and Main Roads (TMR) is a department of the Queensland Government responsible for transport policy and infrastructure. TMR manages Queensland's 33,000-kilometre state road network, which includes 3,100 bridges, and is responsible for the licensing and registration of vehicles and watercraft. TMR also oversees most public transport services throughout the state via Translink.

TMR employs almost 12,000 people, and operates customer service centres, marine operation bases and regional and divisional offices throughout the state. TMR works with Queensland Rail, port authorities, other state and federal government departments, local authorities, industry, and the community.

== History ==
TMR was formed in April 2009 by merging Queensland Transport and the Department of Main Roads.

Translink was previously a separate entity, but has since been merged to be part of TMR.

Following the 2012 state election, Premier Campbell Newman appointed one Minister for the whole department. In 2015, Labor headed by Annastacia Palaszczuk won the state election. Jackie Trad was appointed Minister for Transport and Mark Bailey was appointed Minister for Main Roads, Road Safety and Ports. Bailey gained the Transport portfolio from Trad after the 2017 state election and the department once again reported to a single minister.

== Initiatives ==
Because Queensland driver licences were susceptible to fraud the department initiated a smartcard driver licence project in 2003. The project has suffered from long delays and cost overruns. The transition to the new cards commenced in 2011, and the new cards will replace laminated licences as they come up for renewal, expected to be within 6 years.

The Here For Life campaign was launched in 2009 and has been credited as being a great success in motorcycle rider safety.

== Director-General ==
The current Director-General of the Department of Transport and Main Roads is Sally Stannard.

== Organisational structure ==
The department has 5 deputy directors-general for five divisions:

- Corporate
- Infrastructure Management and Delivery
- Policy, Planning and Investment
- Rail
- Translink
