= Brisbane Metro =

Bus rapid transit system in Brisbane, Australia

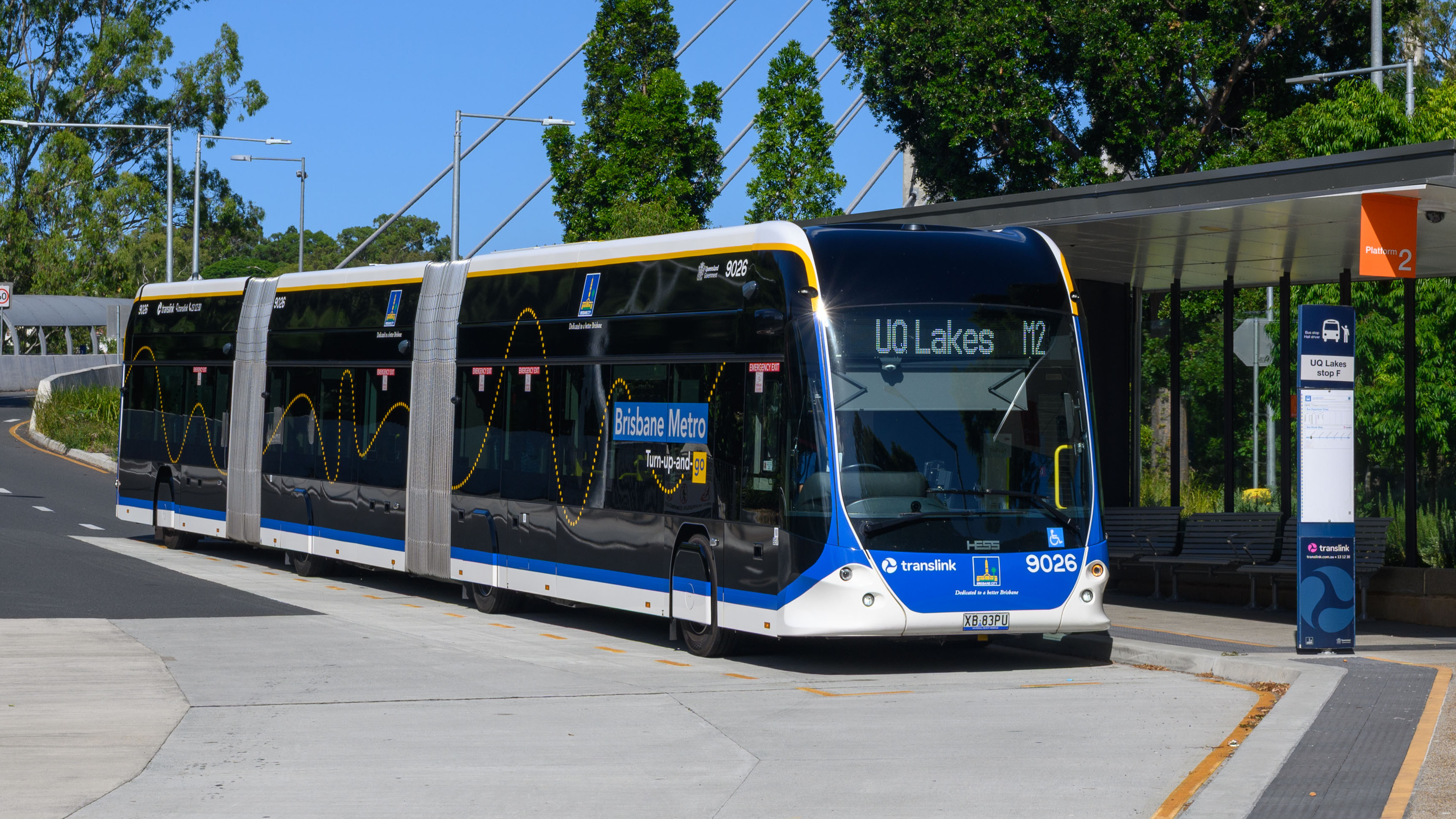
- A route M2 bus at UQ Lakes station

Overview
- Owner: Translink
- Locale: City of Brisbane, Australia
- Transit type: Bus rapid transit
- Number of lines: 2
- Line number: M1, M2
- Number of stations: 18
- Website: metro.brisbane.qld.gov.au

Operation
- Began operation: 28 January 2025 (M2), 30 June 2025 (M1)
- Operator: Transport for Brisbane
- Number of vehicles: 59 HESS lighTram25 bi-articulated buses (58 in service)
- Train length: 3
- Headway: 5-10 minutes

Technical
- System length: 21 km (13 mi)
- Top speed: 90 km/h (55 mph)

Brisbane Metro is a high-frequency bus rapid transit (BRT) system in Brisbane, Queensland, Australia. The system forms part of Translink's South East Queensland public transport network.

The system consists of two routes over 21 km (13 mi) of busways. The routes serve Brisbane CBD every five minutes during peak times, extending as far as Eight Mile Plains, the Royal Brisbane and Women's Hospital and the University of Queensland respectively. Route M2 began service on 28 January 2025. Route M1 began service on 20 June 2025.

== Nomenclature ==
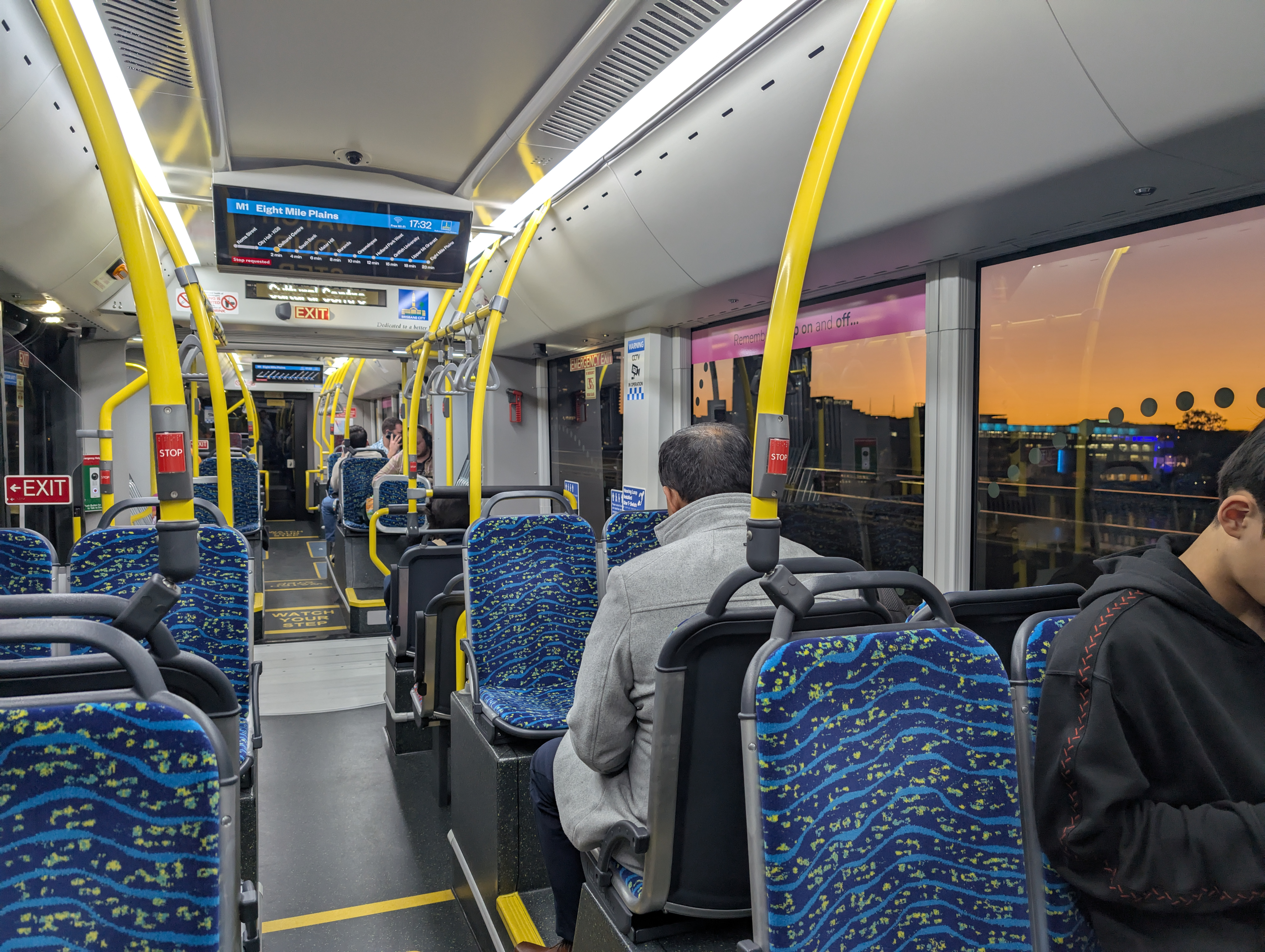
The interior of a Hess lighTram 25 travelling to Eight Mile Plains station

Unlike a standard or rubber-tyred metro, the system uses buses instead of trains, and therefore does not meet the International Association of Public Transport's definition of a "metro".

In 2022, the project's name was criticised by a rail lobby group for having a misleading name that implied it was a rail system, but Brisbane City Council rejected the idea of changing its name. In late 2023, further complaints about the name were raised. A poll by the Brisbane Times revealed 71% of respondents thought that Brisbane Electric Rapid Transit (BERT) was a better name. Robert Dowe of RAIL Back on Track said "They're very good buses, but that's what they are; they're not trains, they're not trams." The Chair of Brisbane Transport Ryan Murphy has admitted the name had caused "some confusion".

== History ==
Since the 1990s, busways were considered as one of the options when the Queensland Government developed the 25 year Integrated Regional Transport Plan. It was recommended that a 75 km (47 mi) network of busway corridors to complement the existing Queensland Rail City network.

The first section of busway, between the CBD and Woolloongabba, opened in September 2000, with the rest of the South East Busway to Eight Mile Plains opening in April 2001 at a final cost of over $600 million. Planning and construction of the Northern and Eastern Busways began soon after the success of the first section, increasing bus commuter statistics. As of 2025, the city has three busways, spanning 29 kilometres, including 28 stations and 20 tunnels.

In 2007, 294 buses per hour (one way) (1 every 12 seconds) passed the busway network's busiest point (a section of the South East Busway north of Woolloongabba station). Further, capacity issues at Cultural Centre Station created a bottle neck in the network, with long lines of buses often queuing over the Victoria Bridge during peak.

== Planning ==
Geometric map of Brisbane Metro

In order to meet the capacity bottlenecks of the busway system, various solutions have been proposed, including conversion to light rail, the BaT tunnel, a second Victoria Bridge, bus route changes, and later, Brisbane Metro.

=== 2016 rubber-tyred metro proposal ===
In January 2016, the Brisbane City Council (BCC) announced a Brisbane Metro system to address the current constraints and challenges facing the busway network. This proposal incorporated the conversion of the busway from Woolloongabba to Herston into a rubber-tyred metro, with a single track to provide power and enable driverless operations.

Major retrofitting would have been required, including special guideways, rolling pads and tunnel interfaces, none of which existed on the busways. This would have closed the inner-city access the busways provided for buses and introduced specialised infrastructure and incompatibility with existing bus and rail systems.

=== 2017 bi-articulated bus proposal ===
In March 2017, the project was redefined shifting to operating high capacity bi-articulated buses, reducing the cost by one-third. The new buses would operate two routes, with one replacing the existing route 66, and the other replacing routes 111 and 160. In November 2017 the BCC released its business case, detailing the benefits, costs and impacts of delivering the project. In November 2017, the project was budgeted to cost $944 million.

The BCC released a draft design report for the project in April 2018 with a project concept displayed publicly for community feedback, following the announcement that Brisbane Metro has been confirmed as a high priority project on Infrastructure Australia's priority list. In April 2018, the federal government agreed to contribute $300 million.

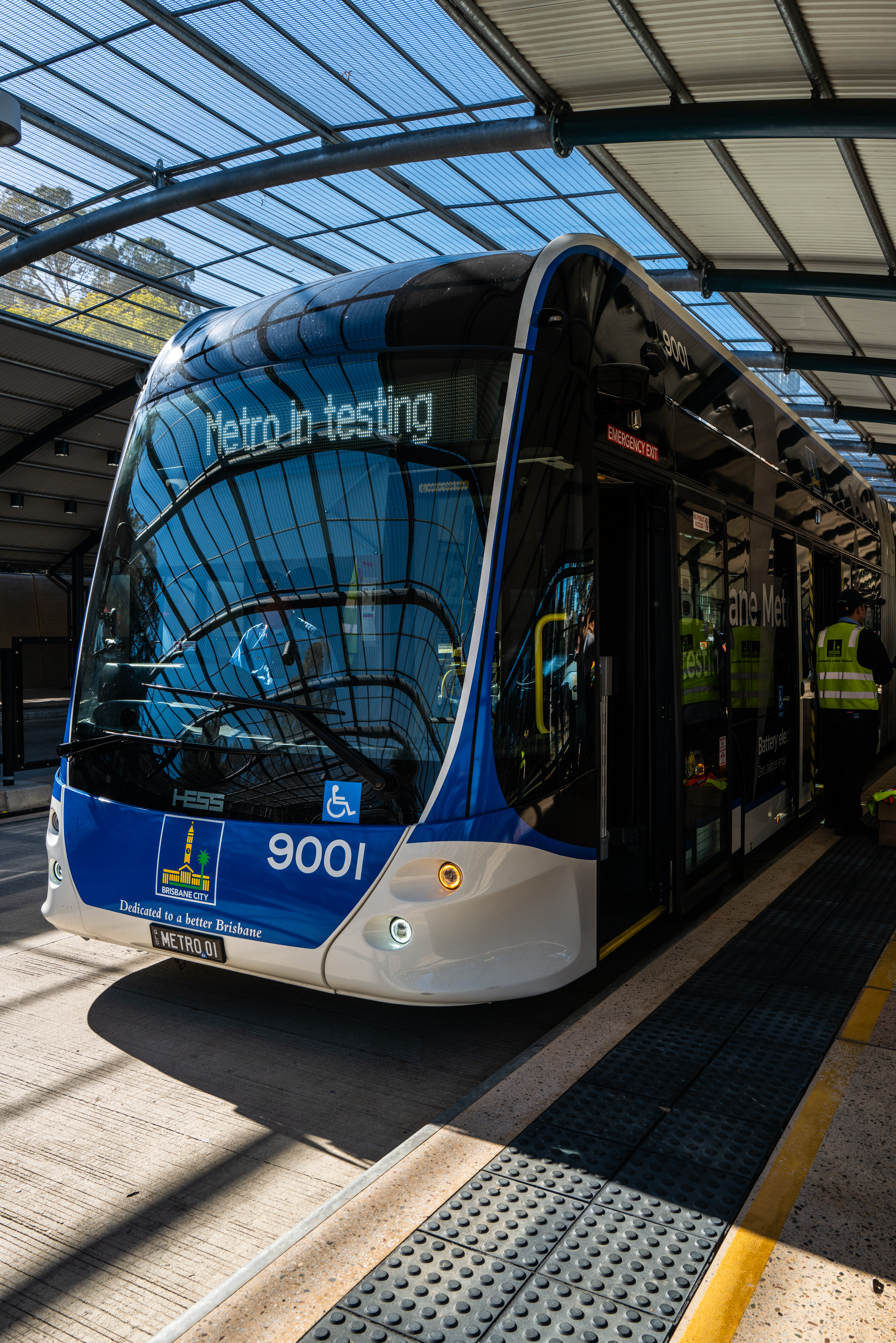
Hess lighTram 25 in testing, June 2023

On 24 November 2019, BCC announced a consortium of Hess, Volgren and ABB had been awarded a contract for 60 buses. The buses were to be fully electric via overhead wireless charging that will charge at the end of each route for less than six minutes.

A pilot bus was built and tested in Europe in 2021, arriving in Brisbane for testing in early 2022. Following successful testing, an order was placed for the remaining 59, with close to 1000 modifications based of the original pilot vehicle. The 60 vehicles cost $190 million, an increase of $100 million compared to more traditionally powered vehicles, with deliveries beginning in late 2023. As of 2026, the full 60 ordered are still being delivered.

In June 2020, after state and council disagreements, the Cultural Centre underground station plan was scrapped, leading to a proposed rebuild of the existing above‑ground station with an extra platform instead.

Upgrades to Mater Hill, Griffith University and Eight Mile Plains stations, as well as dynamic platform allocation, were pushed back to 2034 and 2044 respectively.

== Construction ==
In October 2018 five consortia were shortlisted to bid for the building of stage 1.

- Brisbane Move Consortium: Acciona and Arup
- Lendlease Consortium: Lendlease and WSP
- MetroConnect Consortium: Laing O’Rourke, AECOM and Aurecon
- Metro4Bne Consortium: CPB Contractors, Seymour Whyte, Vinci and SMEC
- TransForm Bne Consortium: McConnell Dowell, John Holland and GHD

ADCO Constructions began work on a 10-hectare (25-acre) depot at Rochedale in October 2021.

By February 2023, the project's cost had increased to an expected $1.7 billion. A contributing factor was the inclusion of a new $450 million bus station to be built at Woolloongabba, in line with the main South East Busway. This was to be funded with $150 Million contributed by all three levels of government under the SEQ City deal. The project would've seen $70 million in resumptions with the new station requiring the deviation of the existing busway, and new layover facilities for charging electric buses with the existing facilities sold off to private developers. A $9.5 million business case completed into the station with the project deemed complete. The remaining funding was then pulled from the project with $150 million going into the business case for extensions and new routes This funding is not included in the overall total for the Brisbane Metro project of $1.55 billion.

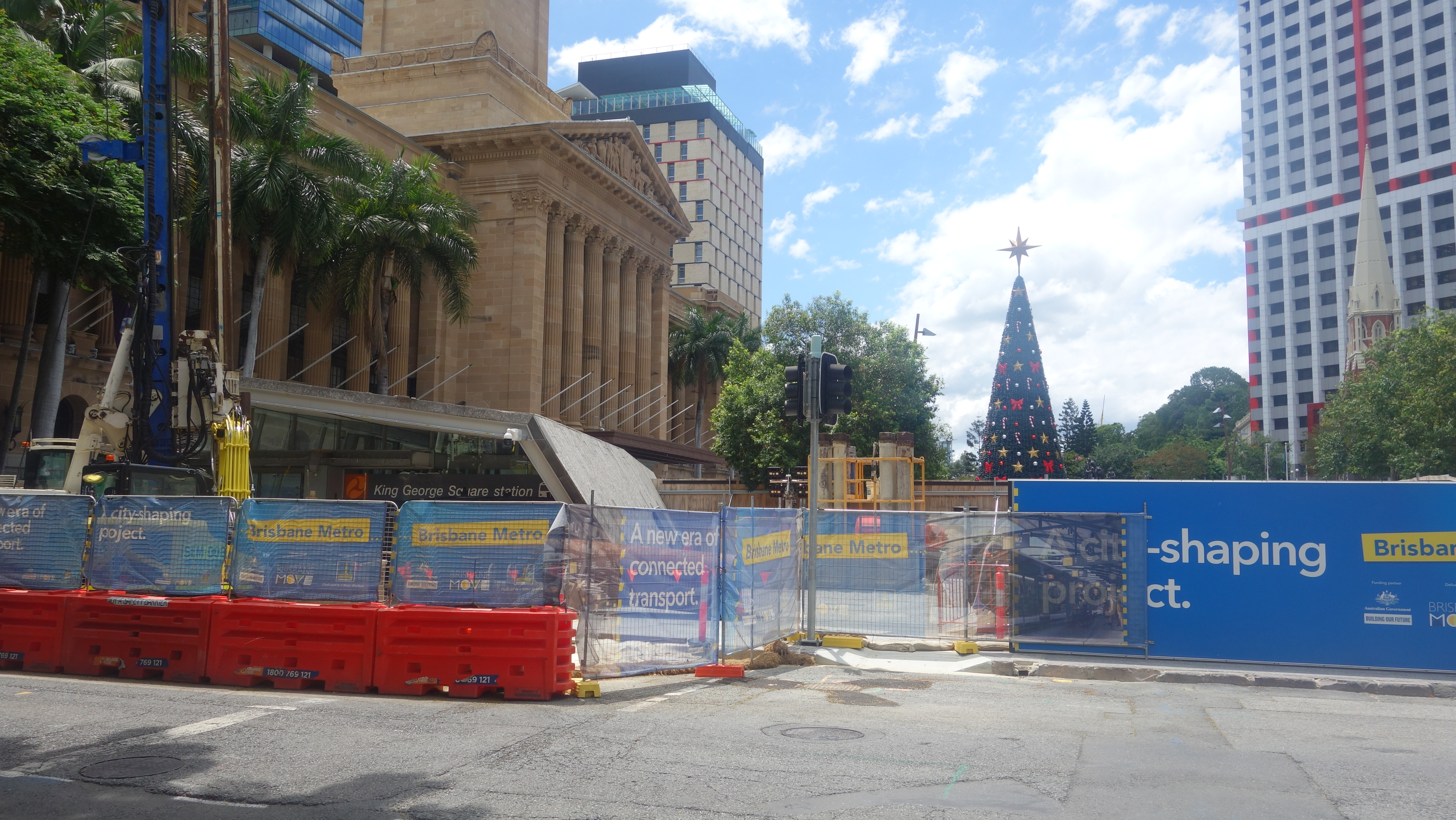
King George Square station undergoing upgrade work for Brisbane Metro.

Also in February 2023, construction began on the 213-metre tunnel beneath Adelaide Street in the CBD, which provided a connection between North Quay and the King George Square busway station. The tunnel connects the South East Busway with the Inner Northern Busway and reduced the number of buses running on city streets. Construction was expected to take at least twelve months.

In October 2024, it was announced that Melanie Zanetti, the voice of Chilli Heeler from popular TV show Bluey would provide the voiceover for the passenger announcement system on the Brisbane Metro.

Brisbane Metro Hess Lightram 25 vehicles began trial passenger service on the morning of 21 October 2024, operating on route 169 between Eight Mile Plains and the University of Queensland. This trial ended on 18 November 2024, with regular buses returning to the 169.

On 5 December 2024, it was announced that route M2 would begin full services on 28 January 2025. Initially services would operate at a maximum of every 5 minutes during peak.

Despite community support for the continuation of route 86, it was announced that the Brisbane City Council would not supply further funding for the trial service beyond January 2025, and it was removed from operation on 28 January 2025, coinciding with the introduction of route M2.

Route 111 and 160 ran their final services on the night of 29 June 2025. Route M1 began operations on the morning of 30 June 2025, along with the introduction of Brisbane's New Bus Network.

The new Adelaide Street Tunnel opened on 29 September 2025 with the final HESS lighTram 25 TOSA vehicle was delivered to the Rochedale depot in April 2026. Frequency is planned to be increased to every 3 minutes after the opening of the tunnel and delivery of all 60 buses.

== Fleet ==
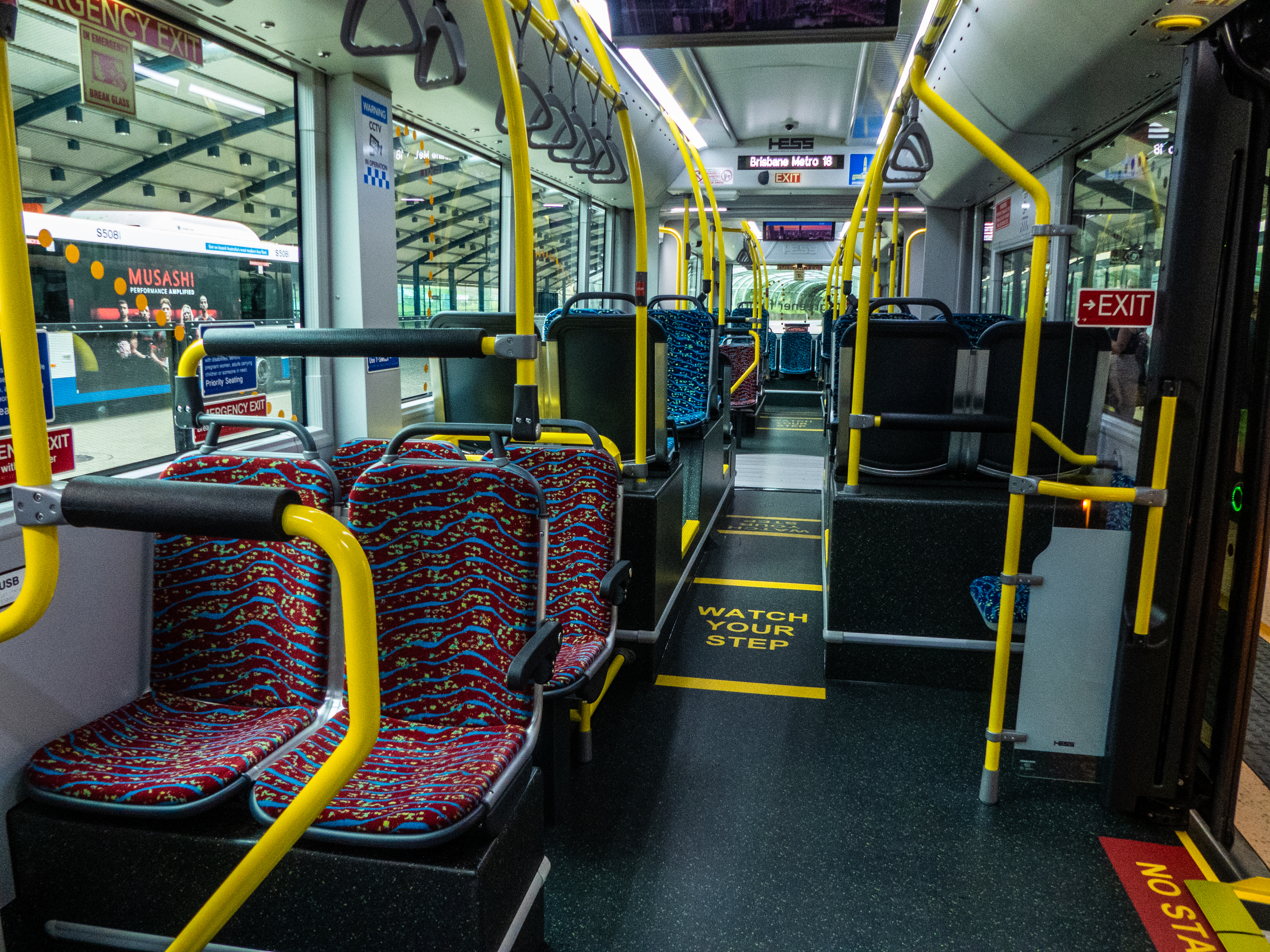
Inside a Hess lighTram 25

The Brisbane Metro fleet consists of 60 HESS lighTram 25 TOSA low-floor bi-articulated buses, manufactured by Carrosserie HESS AG. For operation in Australia, a right-hand-drive version of the lighTram was developed, as well as inclusion of the rapid-charging system TOSA (Trolleybus Optimisation du Système d’Alimentation) for fast charging at ends of routes. The buses have lithium-titanium-oxide batteries.

The vehicles have a top speed of 90 km/h (56 mph) with provision to carry 150 passengers or 170 during events, with seating for 64, including 10 priority seats. The bus features three double doors to support all‑door boarding, along with automated front‑door ramp. Inside the front segment of the bus, there are three large mobility bays.

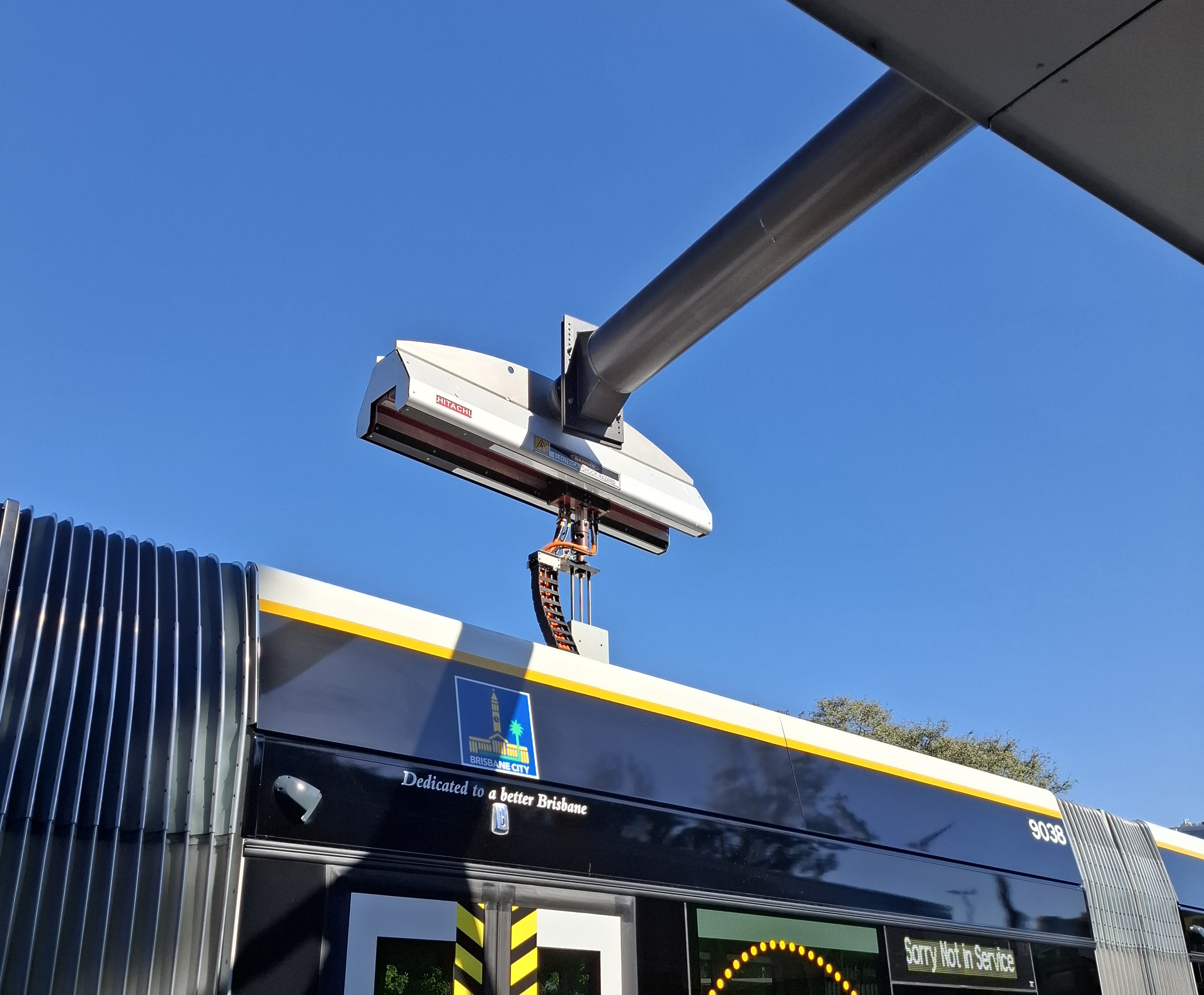
Hess lighTram 25 charging at UQ Lakes station

There are dynamic route displays showing the next stop and real‑time arrival information, supported by audio announcements and hearing loops. The vehicle includes USB‑A and USB‑C charging ports as well as onboard Wi‑Fi.

The vehicles have been delivered gradually to the Brisbane Metro depot at Rochedale, which was specially constructed to host the new buses. The 10-hectare site hosts stabling and maintenance facilities for the fleet. The design of the depot is based on sustainability. There are 2,300 solar panels in use. Rainwater harvesting and recycled water systems for vehicle washing are both used. Sixty 50 kW slow chargers are hosted here to be used during off-peak times.

== Routes ==
The system consists of two routes covering 21 kilometres and 17 stations.

Route		Length	Stations	Opened	Equipment
M1	Roma Street-Eight Mile Plains	17 km (11 mi)	11	30 June 2025	HESS lighTram25 TOSA
M2	RBWH-UQ Lakes	9.7 km (6.0 mi)	11	28 February 2025	HESS lighTram25 TOSA

The network uses existing busway infrastructure and provides high-frequency services with 5-10 minute headways from approximately 6:00am to 6:00pm. Outside of this peak, services operate every 10-15 minutes. On weekends, services operate at 10-15 minute frequency with 24-hour service from Friday evening through to Sunday evening. Once all 60 buses are delivered, three minute headways will be introduced.

With the introduction of the M1 and M2 routes, various regular bus routes now terminate at busway stations outside the city, allowing for transfers with the Brisbane Metro. This reduces bus traffic in busy inner-city stations, with most routes terminating at Queen Street bus station remaining, separating trunk and feeder services.

=== M1 ===
The Roma Street to Eight Mile Plains service, referred to as route number M1 and sometimes stylised as Southern Metro by BCC, began operations on the 30 June 2025, replacing routes 111 and 160.

It provides a key suburban trunk corridor from the southern suburbs to Brisbane CBD. The route uses the South East busway and provides interchange with various other Translink services.

==== Stations ====
List of M1 Roma Street - Eight Mile Plains stations
M1 Roma Street - Eight Mile Plains
Station	Image	Suburb	Opened	Terrain	Connections
Roma Street		Brisbane CBD	19 May 2008	Elevated	Ipswich/Rosewood line Springfield line Doomben Cleveland line Gold Coast line Beenleigh line Brisbane Metro Bus transport in Queensland
King George Square		Brisbane CBD	19 May 2008	Underground	Brisbane Metro Bus transport in Queensland
Cultural Centre		South Brisbane	23 October 2000	Ground	Cleveland line Gold Coast line Beenleigh line Brisbane Metro Bus transport in Queensland
South Bank		South Brisbane	23 October 2000	Elevated	Cleveland line Gold Coast line Beenleigh line Brisbane Metro Bus transport in Queensland
Mater Hill		South Brisbane	23 October 2000	Ground	Brisbane Metro Bus transport in Queensland
Buranda		Buranda	30 April 2001	Sunken	Cleveland line Bus transport in Queensland
Greenslopes		Greenslopes	30 April 2001	Ground	Bus transport in Queensland
Holland Park West		Holland Park West	30 April 2001	Elevated	Bus transport in Queensland
Griffith University		Mount Gravatt	30 April 2001	Ground	Bus transport in Queensland
Upper Mount Gravatt		Upper Mount Gravatt	30 April 2001	Sunken	Bus transport in Queensland
Eight Mile Plains		Eight Mile Plains	30 April 2001	Sunken	Bus transport in Queensland

=== M2 ===
The RBWH to UQ Lakes service, referred to as route number M2 and sometimes stylised as Northern Metro by BCC, began operations on the 28 January 2025, replacing route 66.

It provides a key education, knowledge and health corridor by connecting the University of Queensland with the Royal Brisbane & Women's Hospital, via the Princess Alexandra Hospital and the Queensland University of Technology's Kelvin Grove Campus. The route uses the Eastern and Northern busways and provides interchange with various other Translink services.

==== Stations ====
List of M2 RBWH - UQ Lakes stations
M2 RBWH - UQ Lakes
Station	Image	Suburb	Opened	Terrain	Connections
RBWH		Herston	3 August 2009	Elevated	Exhibition line Bus transport in Queensland
Herston		Herston	14 December 2005	Ground	Bus transport in Queensland
QUT Kelvin Grove		Kelvin Grove	23 February 2004	Ground	Bus transport in Queensland
Normanby		Kelvin Grove	14 December 2005	Sunken	Bus transport in Queensland
Roma Street		Brisbane CBD	19 May 2008	Elevated	Ipswich/Rosewood line Springfield line Doomben Cleveland line Gold Coast line Beenleigh line Brisbane Metro Bus transport in Queensland
King George Square		Brisbane CBD	19 May 2008	Underground	Brisbane Metro Bus transport in Queensland
Cultural Centre		South Brisbane	23 October 2000	Ground	Cleveland line Gold Coast line Beenleigh line Brisbane Metro Bus transport in Queensland
South Bank		South Brisbane	23 October 2000	Elevated	Cleveland line Gold Coast line Beenleigh line Brisbane Metro Bus transport in Queensland
Mater Hill		South Brisbane	23 October 2000	Ground	Brisbane Metro Bus transport in Queensland
PA Hospital		Buranda	3 August 2009	Elevated	Bus transport in Queensland
Boggo Road		Dutton Park	3 August 2009	Ground	Cleveland line Gold Coast line Beenleigh line Bus transport in Queensland
UQ Lakes		St Lucia	17 December 2006	Ground	Bus transport in Queensland Ferry transport in Queensland

== Extensions ==
Brisbane City Council has proposed several extensions of the network, including to Capalaba, Carseldine, Springwood and Brisbane Airport.

=== 2018 proposed extensions ===
In 2018 Brisbane City Council released indicative plans for the expansion of Brisbane Metro and its integration with the existing and future CityGlider network.

=== 2025 proposed extensions ===
Following the opening of routes M1 and M2, in August 2024, Premier Steven Miles and Lord Mayor Adrian Schrinner announced plans to extend the network to Capalaba, Carseldine, Springwood and Brisbane Airport in time for the 2032 Summer Olympics. In February 2025, the Federal Government released funding for a $50 million rapid business case into the proposed expansions.

The route of the expansions keep to the former Northern and Eastern Busway extension plans from the early 2010s, and follow the Gympie Road and Old-Cleveland Road corridors respectively. As part of that announcement, it was also confirmed that a conversion of the Doomben line to busway for Brisbane Airport was one of the two shortlisted routes, the other being a more direct alignment via the Airportlink tunnel.

In March 2026, these expansions were included in Infrastructure Australia's 2026 Infrastructure Priority List (IPL) within the 2-4 year pipeline for delivery.

==== M1, Roma Street—Springwood ====
Route M1 is proposed to be extended along the South East Busway to Springwood, via Rochedale.

==== M2, UQ Lakes—Carseldine ====
Route M2 is proposed to be extended along Gympie Road to Carseldine, via Windsor, Lutwyche, Kedron Brook, Kedron North, Chermside, and Aspley.

==== M3, Roma Street—Capalaba ====
Route M3 is a proposed route from Roma Street to Capalaba, following the early 2010s Eastern Busway proposed extension along Old-Cleveland Road.

Below is a list of stops and stations that Metro 3 may service and potential transport connections.

Station name	Public transport connections
Roma Street	Roma Street railway station, local bus services and Metro 1, 2, & 4
King George Square	Local bus services and Metro 1, 2, & 4
Cultural Centre	South Brisbane railway station, local bus services and Metro 1, 2, & 4
South Bank	South Bank railway station, local bus services and Metro 1, 2, & 4
Mater Hill	Local bus services and Metro 1, 2, & 4
Buranda	Buranda railway station and local bus services
Stones Corner	Local bus services
Langlands Park	Local bus services
Coorparoo	Local bus services
Camp Hill	Local bus services
Carina	Local bus services
Carindale	Local bus services
Chandler	Local bus services
Capalaba	Local bus services

==== M4, Woolloongabba—Airport ====
Route M4 is a proposed route from Woolloongabba to Brisbane Airport.

Below is a list of stops and stations that Metro 4 may service and potential transport connections.

Station name	Public transport connections
Woolloongabba	Local bus services, Woolloongabba Cross River Rail station
Mater Hill	Local bus services and Metro 1, 2, & 3
South Bank	South Bank railway station, local bus services and Metro 1, 2, & 3
Cultural Centre	South Brisbane railway station, local bus services and Metro 1, 2, & 3
King George Square	Local bus services and Metro 1, 2, & 3
Roma Street	Roma Street railway station, local bus services and Metro 1, 2, & 3
Normanby	Local bus services and Metro 2
QUT Kelvin Grove	Local bus services and Metro 2
Herston	Local bus services and Metro 2
RBWH	Local bus services and Metro 2
International Airport	International Airport railway station
Domestic Airport	Domestic Airport railway station

== See also ==
- Busways in Brisbane, the dedicated infrastructure used by Brisbane Metro
- TransLink, the manager of the South East Queensland public transport network
- O-Bahn Busway, a guided busway in Adelaide, South Australia.
- Transport in Brisbane, the operator of Brisbane Metro
