= Buranda State School =

- Location within Queensland
- 27.4967°S 153.0438°E
- Location: 24 Cowley Street, Woolloongabba, City of Brisbane, Queensland, Australia

History
- Design period: 1919–1930s (Interwar period)
- Built: 1920–1936

Site notes
- Architect: Department of Public Works (Queensland)

Queensland Heritage Register
- Official name: Buranda State School
- Type: state heritage
- Designated: 28 April 2017
- Reference no.: 650045
- Type: Education, research, scientific facility: School-state
- Theme: Educating Queenslanders: Providing primary schooling

Buranda State School is a heritage-listed state school at 24 Cowley Street, Woolloongabba, City of Brisbane, Queensland, Australia. It was designed by Department of Public Works (Queensland) and built from 1920 to 1928. It was added to the Queensland Heritage Register on 28 April 2017.

== History ==
Buranda State School, established in 1918, is located in the suburb of Woolloongabba, approximately three kilometres southwest of the Brisbane CBD. It is important in demonstrating the evolution of state education and its associated architecture. It retains its suburban timber school building (1920, 1928) with WWII honour boards (1944, post-1945); set in landscaped grounds with a swimming pool, dressing shed and terraces (1926); sports oval; retaining walls (1926–36); and mature trees. The school has a strong and ongoing association with the Buranda-Stone's Corner-Woolloongabba community.

Traditionally the lands of the Turrbal and Jagera people, suburban development around the Buranda State School site began in the 1880s. The nearby Stone's Corner Hotel opened in the late 1880s and by the 1890s industries were established in the area. The Cleveland railway line ran to the north of the future school site from 1889 and from 1897 electric trams operated along Logan Road to Stones Corner. By 1908 the population had grown sufficiently for the Department of Public Instruction to commence planning a school to serve the district.

The establishment of schools was considered an essential step in the development of new communities and integral to their success. Schools became a community focus, with the school community contributing to maintenance and development; a symbol of progress; and a source of pride, with enduring connections formed with past pupils, parents, and teachers.

To help ensure consistency and economy, the Queensland Government developed standard plans for its school buildings. From the 1860s until the 1960s, Queensland school buildings were predominantly timber-framed, an easy and cost-effective approach that also enabled the government to provide facilities in remote areas. Standard designs were continually refined in response to changing needs and educational philosophy and Queensland school buildings were particularly innovative in climate control, lighting, and ventilation. Standardisation produced distinctly similar schools across Queensland with complexes of typical components.

Buranda State School was established as a separate Girls and Infants School (1918) and a Boys School (1920) to provide primary school education for the growing population in the locality of Logan Road. Its site, formed from Crown land, purchased land, and a South Brisbane City Council quarry, was proclaimed as a school reserve in 1916. The timber Girls and Infants School building occupied high ground at the northwest of the site, and was accessed via Martin Street. The school's name was taken from the nearby Buranda railway station. Establishment of the school was intended to relieve the enrolment pressure on East Brisbane, Dunellan (later Greenslopes), Junction Park and Dutton Park state schools.

The Buranda Boys School opened on 27 September 1920 with an enrolment of 173 pupils. Its suburban timber school building (Block A), positioned in the lower southwestern portion of the site and accessed via Cowley Street, was a high-set, timber building with a continuous north verandah, and central, projecting teachers rooms. The building comprised a central wing with two side wings, each with a Dutch gable roof of shingle tiles and central fleche. It seated 320 boys in eight classrooms. The central wing was divided into four classrooms 21 by 20 feet (6.4 m × 6.1 m) and each side wing into two similar-sized rooms separated by fixed glazed partitions. The undercroft was utilised for play space and lavatories.

This building type, introduced in 1914, was the culmination of years of experimentation that solved many of the problems of light, ventilation, and classroom size, which had plagued previous school designs, as well as providing the ideal, modern education environment. From 1893 the Department of Public Works greatly improved the natural ventilation and lighting of classroom interiors, experimenting with different combinations of roof ventilators, ceiling and wall vents, larger windows, dormer windows and ducting. In c. 1909 high-set timber buildings had been introduced, providing better ventilation as well as further teaching space and a covered play area underneath. This was a noticeable new direction and this form became a characteristic of Queensland schools.

Prior to the widespread adoption of electricity and artificial lighting, achieving an ideal or even adequate level of natural light in classrooms, without glare, was of critical importance to educators and consequently it became central to the design and layout of all school buildings. From around 1909 windows were rearranged and enlarged to provide a greater amount of gentle, southern light into the room and desks were rearranged so that the light would fall onto students' left hand sides to avoid throwing shadows onto the pages; this presupposed that all students were right-handed. Windows were larger and sills were lowered to let in more light generally. Smaller classrooms were preferred as they were easier to light correctly. Interiors became lighter and airier and met with immediate approval from educationalists. These features - large banks of south-facing windows and smaller classrooms - are retained at Buranda State School.

An important component of Queensland state schools was their grounds. The early and continuing commitment to play-based education, particularly in primary school, resulted in the provision of outdoor play space and sporting facilities, such as ovals and tennis courts. Also, trees and gardens were planted to shade and beautify schools. In the 1870s, schools inspector William Alexander Boyd was critical of tropical schools and his recommendations stressed the importance of the adding shade trees to playgrounds. Subsequently, Arbor Day celebrations began in Queensland in 1890. Aesthetically designed gardens were encouraged by regional inspectors, and educators believed gardening and Arbor Days instilled in young minds the value of hard work and activity, improved classroom discipline, developed aesthetic tastes, and inspired people to stay on the land. Arbor Day celebrations at Buranda State School commenced in 1918 and were conducted up to at least the late 1950s. By 1958 there were 63 planted trees alive in the school grounds.

Buranda State School's Committee undertook an active programme of fund-raising events to improve the school's facilities. This included an annual combined schools' fete, fancy dress balls, socials, euchre parties and excursions. One major outcome of its efforts was the school swimming pool 25 by 10 yards (22.9 m × 9.1 m) with dressing shed, goldfish pond and landscaping, completed for £1800 and opened debt-free. At its opening during a school fete on 30 October 1926, Alderman Lawry acknowledged that the baths were "a splendid record of voluntary work, teachers, parents and pupils all assisting in the hard work of clearing and excavating the ground....[while] the Public Works Department...suppl[ied] the materials". When opening the pool, the Lord Mayor of Brisbane, William Jolly, stated "Not only was it a perfect pool but the terraced lawns, flower beds, goldfish pond, and dressing shed created an environment which could not fail to inculcate a love of the beautiful in the children".

The establishment of swimming pools in Queensland state schools was a growing trend in the early decades of the 20th century. The perceived benefits of learning to swim for pupils were expounded from 1915 onwards: as a particularly appropriate physical exercise during summer; of value to children's physiques; and for water safety reasons to prevent drownings. Earlier pools had opened at Junction Park State School (1910), Milton State School (1914), Wooloowin State School (1916), Ascot State School (1921), Cannon Hill State School (1921), Wilston State School (1923), and Windsor State School (February 1926).

A large section of the swimming pool's retaining wall collapsed early in 1927, taking with it fencing and concrete floor slabs. Repairs to the wall were completed by M R Hornibrook for £150. The rebuilt structure was described as a "battered stone retaining wall...approximately 10 feet (3.05m) from the baths on the southern side and eastern end...".

Growth in pupil numbers at both Buranda schools resulted in extensions in 1928. The Boys School gained a two-storey addition to accommodate 80 pupils, which was approved in April 1928, with a cost of £2090. A school fete on 22 September 1928 celebrated its completion. This extension comprised two classrooms on each floor and the upper-level rooms had folding partitions for assembly room purposes. Circa 1940, the area under the west wing was enclosed as a music and art room. Enrolments reached a peak with an average attendance of 1217 in 1934, leading to the opening of a separate Infants' School, fronting Salisbury Street, on 30 January 1934, with 225 pupils.

Meanwhile, the school committee continued to work to improve the schools. Between 1926 and 1929 they erected a shelter shed at the lower tennis courts, improved drainage on the site, formed lawns and improved flower beds, and built a concrete retaining wall and steps near the oval (c. 1928-29). This is the retaining wall running north of the eastern wing of the Block A, which appears in aerial photography available from 1936. The sports oval and parade ground were completed by December 1934. A driveway, rockeries and flower beds for the Boys School Entrance, via Cowley Street, were completed by 1934. A remnant of this is the low retaining wall in the south-western corner of the site near the Cowley Street entrance, apparent on aerial photograph from 1936. Rows of fig trees near the Martin Street entrance appear on aerial photography from 1936.

World War II affected Buranda State School in similar ways to other Queensland state school. In January 1942 due to the fear of a Japanese invasion, the Queensland Government closed all coastal state schools, and although most schools reopened on 2 March 1942, student attendance was optional until the war ended. Slit trenches, for protecting the students from Japanese air raids, were also dug at Queensland state schools. At Buranda State School about 1,150 feet (350 m) of these trenches were dug. Typically, schools were a focus for civilian duty during wartime. At many, students and staff members grew produce and flowers for donation to local hospitals and organised fundraising and the donation of useful items to Australian soldiers on active service. Students at Buranda State School attended War Funds concerts at the Brisbane City Hall; contributed to Red Cross Appeals and a Prisoner of War Fund; and purchased war savings certificates.

In recognition of former students of the school serving in the armed forces during World War II, the school community organised an honour board, which was funded by a swimming carnival held in March 1944. Unveiled on 25 July 1944 by James Larcombe, Minister for Public Instruction, the Honour Board displayed the names of 456 former pupils serving in the armed forces. The large timber board, measuring 3.8 by 1 metre (12.5 ft × 3.3 ft), has been mounted in the easternmost wall of the eastern understorey classroom since at least 1993. A second, smaller honour board, beside the large honour board, lists a further 14 former pupils who served during WWII.

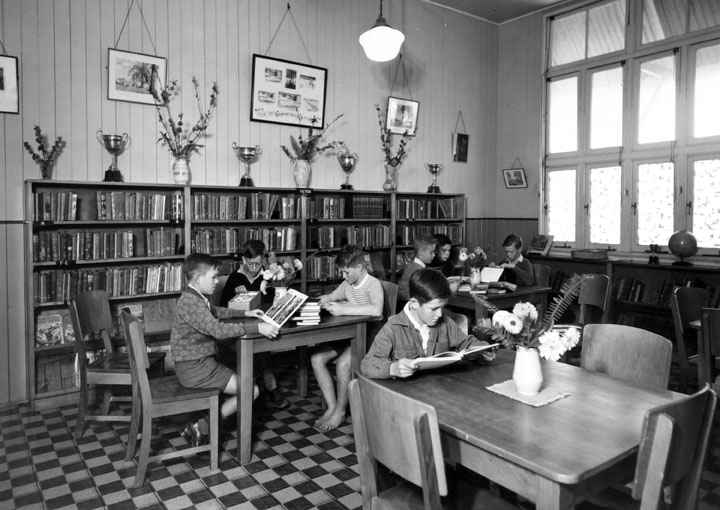
Children reading in the library, circa 1950

After World War II, enrolments at the Buranda Schools fell from the 1930s' peak. Total enrolments in 1959 were 798. Pupil numbers continued to fall due to developmental and demographic changes in the school's catchment area. Families moved from inner city to outlying suburbs in this period; a large number of houses in the Thompson Estate to the west of the school were resumed for the construction of the Southeast Suburbs Freeway (1967–75); and residential areas underwent commercial development.

The school grounds were expanded a number of times over the years, increasing the site from 1.21 hectares (3.0 acres) in 1918 to 2.78 hectares (6.9 acres) in 2017, through the addition of land via road closures, land purchases and exchanges; and despite the sale of the former Girls School site. Flood mitigation work to Norman Creek in 1958, straightened and widened the creek. A bend that ran through the school oval was filled and levelled, and land was transferred between the Brisbane City Council and the Department of Public Instruction, resulting in the current configuration of the school oval.

Falling student numbers led to the combining of the Girls and Infants Schools, on the Girls School site in Martin Street, from January 1963 when the Buranda Infants School site was taken over by Narbethong School for the Visually Handicapped. Buranda Girls and Infants School and Buranda Boys School were combined as Buranda State School on the Boys School site from 1 January 1967. Average attendance in 1967 was 314 pupils, but fell to 50 in the 1990s. Buranda Opportunity School (later Buranda Special School) was established on the Girls School site.

Sometime between July 1974 and July 1979, the original Infants School building was demolished to make way for a new building for Narbethong School, which was opened in July 1979. The Girls School building has also been demolished.

Alterations to the suburban timber school building have taken place over time. Changes include enclosure of part of the east verandah of the eastern wing for a storeroom in 1980; and enclosure of the north verandah of the eastern wing, with demolition of its verandah wall and internal partitions to create larger classrooms. In 1999 changes to classroom sizes in the central wing were made through removal of dividing walls. In 2017 the suburban timber school building is largely used for staff and office purposes.

Community involvement in Buranda State School has been continuous since its establishment. Annual combined schools' fetes were held from the 1920s to 1939, and recommenced in the post-war period. Other fundraising and social events were popular in the pre-war period such as fancy dress balls, "socials", euchre parties and excursions. The school's 75th anniversary was commemorated with the publication of a school history and the holding of a school reunion.

In 2017, Buranda State School continues to operate from its original site. It retains its suburban timber school building, swimming pool and dressing shed, set in landscaped grounds with sporting facilities, playing areas, retaining walls and mature shade trees. Buranda State School is important to its district as a key social focus for the community. Generations of students have been taught there and many social events held in the school's grounds and buildings since its establishment.

== Description ==
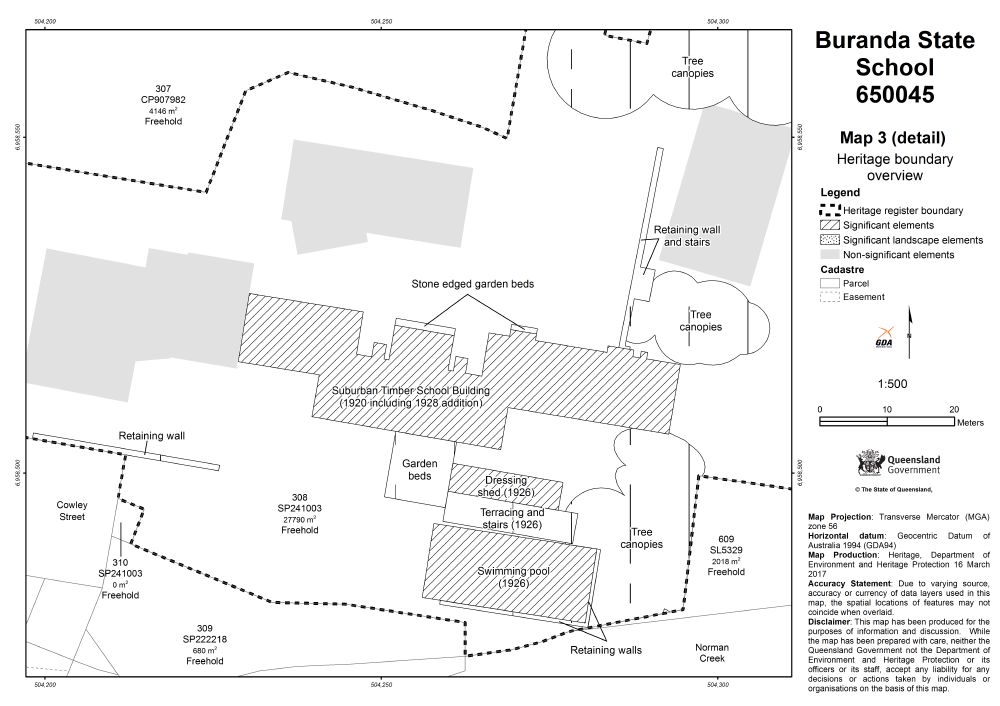
Site map, 2017

Buranda State School occupies a 2.78 hectares (6.9 acres) site in Buranda, a locality within the suburb of Woolloongabba, approximately three kilometres southwest of Brisbane CBD. The site is bounded by Cowley Street, Norman Creek and the Eastern Busway (south), Martin Street (northwest), Salisbury Street (northeast), Churchill Street (east), and light industrial and residential properties (west, north and east). The school shares its site with Narbethong State Special School, which is located at the northeast end of the site and is excluded from the heritage register boundary. Buranda State School's significant buildings are located on a plateau in the southwestern corner of the site, edged by steep rocky cliffs along the western and northern sides. Access is via a main entrance from Cowley Street and a secondary entrance from Martin Street. Pedestrian access from the south is provided via a footbridge over Norman Creek. Situated adjacent to the Cowley Street entrance is the earliest remaining building - a suburban timber school building (Block A; 1920, with 1928 extension). An early swimming pool, dressing shed and concrete terraces (1926) are located south of the eastern end of Block A. Other significant elements within the school grounds include a concrete retaining wall and stairs (1928–9), a stone retaining wall on two sides of the swimming pool (1926–7), World War II (WWII) Honour Boards in Block A (1944 and post-WWII), rock-edged gardens beds and walls (c. 1926-1936), and mature trees.

=== Suburban timber school building (Block A) ===
The suburban timber school building (Block A) is a highset, timber-framed and weatherboard-clad structure. Orientated on an east–west axis, it comprises three, symmetrically arranged wings - central, eastern and western - with two adjacent teachers rooms on the northern side of the central wing. The eastern wing is longer due to a two-storey extension (1928) to the eastern end, which has its first floor aligned with the 1920 building and the ground floor set at a lower level than the understorey.

The three wings have Dutch gable roofs and the teachers rooms has a gable roof. All roofs are clad in corrugated metal sheeting and the gablets are infilled with weatherboards. The north-facing wall of the teachers rooms has batten infill to the gable and two timber-framed, skillion-roofed window hoods which retain original asbestos tile cladding. Ground floor windows along the southern side of the 1928 extension are sheltered by wide timber-framed, skillion-roofed window hoods clad in corrugated metal sheeting. The building's raked eaves have exposed rafters and are lined with tongue-and-groove (T&G), V-jointed (VJ) timber boards. The building is set on brick piers and stumps, and a north-facing verandah, accessed by sets of timber stairs, provides circulation for the whole building. Non-significant elements of the exterior include: steel roofs over the eastern wing verandah stairs; roof-mounted solar panels; modern awnings to enclosed verandah windows; a deck area and ramp constructed on the southern side of the 1928 extension; air conditioning units; modern security screens to windows; and modern pipes and service conduits.

The verandah has a raked ceiling lined in T&G, VJ timber boards; sections of surviving two-rail slat balustrade (other sections have been replaced by bag racks); and square timber posts that are linked by curved timber arches. All verandah walls are single-skin, with T&G, VJ timber board linings and externally-exposed stud-framing; with hat hooks attached to some walls. Non-significant elements of the verandah include: recent enclosures at the far eastern and western ends of the verandah; a store room adjacent to the west wall of the eastern wing; a replacement staircase and lift attached to the north verandah of the western wing; and a staircase inserted within the verandah space at the eastern end of the western wing.

In 2017, the central wing comprises office and staff rooms (from west to east - the Principal's office, administration office, sick bay and conference room), with original partitions removed and new partitions inserted. The teachers rooms are intact and contain two small offices. The western wing contains a double classroom space with the dividing partition removed and incorporates a section of enclosed verandah (used for after school care in 2017). In the eastern wing, all first floor rooms incorporate enclosed verandah space and have had the verandah walls removed. The 1920 section contains two former classrooms (used for staff and teaching purposes in 2017). The first floor of the 1928 section contains a double classroom (used as a music room in 2017) and a store room at the verandah end. The ground floor contains a single large room (used as a staff room in 2017) and the enclosed verandah retains the verandah wall and a former hat room at the verandah end. Interior spaces throughout the building retain bulkheads that indicate the original layout of dividing partitions. Most spaces have timber T&G, VJ board-lined walls and ceilings - the ceilings of the wings are coved and those in the teachers rooms are flat. The rooms retain their timber floor boards, simple timber skirting boards, exposed metal tie rods and latticed, square ceiling ventilation panels. Non-significant features of the interior include: a set of c. 1967 stairs leading down to the verandah of the 1928 section; recent carpet and linoleum floor linings; kitchenettes; and modern partitions, doors and cupboards.

A range of original and early timber joinery is retained throughout the building, including: high-level, centre-pivoting windows to the eastern and western end walls of each wing; double-hung sashes to the verandah walls (early additions); and double-leaf doors with tall horizontally centre-pivoting fanlights to most classrooms. Large banks of windows to the southern elevations are casements along the bottom row and horizontally centre-pivoting windows and fanlights above. Fanlights in the 1920 wings are set in inclined frames. Windows to the teachers rooms are tall, three-light casements with square fanlights. One set of original folding timber doors survives on the first floor of the 1928 section.

The understorey has a concrete slab floor, with concrete surface drains, and glazed, brown brick piers with rounded edges. A low brick retaining wall runs along the northern edge of western wing with batten screens above, fixed between piers. Most of the understorey is used as open play-space, with the remainder enclosed by partitions to create classroom, store room and tuckshop spaces. An early enclosure which survives beneath the western wing (originally a pre-1939 art and music room) has timber walls lined with vertical VJ boards with timber-framed, four-light, horizontally centre-pivoting windows set high in the southern and western walls. Steel beams inserted to support the floor above were inserted c. 1940. An early braced and ledged timber board door survives in the eastern wall, and modifications have been made to the northern end of the room to create a separate uniform shop (such as replacing the timber windows with louvres). Beneath the 1920 section of the eastern wing are former toilets (now storerooms and a workshop) enclosed by timber walls lined with vertical VJ boards (west and north sides), brick (adjoining the 1928 extension) and rendered masonry walls (southern side). These walls retain timber batten doors and early fixed louvres in timber frames. Other understorey enclosures, including the tuck shop and storeroom beneath the central wing (c. 1967) and the store rooms beneath the teachers rooms, are not of heritage significance.

=== Swimming pool (1926) ===
Directly south of the eastern end of Block A is a rectangular, in-ground concrete swimming pool, with a timber dressing shed along its northern side. The sloping ground between the pool and shed is terraced with a series of concrete retaining walls and stairs.

The swimming pool, which measures 22.86 by 9.14 metres (75.0 ft × 30.0 ft), has tiled edges and is surrounded by a concrete slab. Non-significant elements include the diving blocks, metal rails and ladders, and a smaller pool to the west (constructed c. 1971).

The dressing shed is a long, rectangular building, lowset on concrete stumps and clad in timber weatherboards. The gable roof is clad in corrugated metal sheeting. It has a verandah along the southern side (overlooking the pool) with a timber floor, two-rail balustrade, and a single-skin wall, with T&G, VJ timber board lining and externally-exposed stud-framing. A doorway in the centre of the verandah wall is ornamented with a timber fretwork arch. All windows are set high in the walls - those in the north wall are fixed louvres in timber frames; windows in the verandah wall and end walls appear to be modern fixed or awning windows. Internally, a central entrance area is flanked by identical dressing rooms with shower rooms at each end of the building. Walls are lined with T&G, VJ timber boards and have a flat-sheet dado. The ceiling is lined with flat sheets with batten cover strips in a square grid pattern. Metal hooks and timber seating line the walls of the dressing rooms. Non-significant element of the interior include: modern tiles lining the floor and walls of the shower rooms; modern doors and shower fittings; and linoleum floor linings.

The terraces comprise: two long retaining walls; a central stairway flanked by square concrete posts; an eastern stairway and pathway; a set of steps heading west from the lower terrace level; a section of wall heading south from the stairs; and garden bed edging adjacent to the dressing shed verandah. All walls and curbing have a rounded top surface. Round drainage holes are regularly spaced along the retaining walls. Non-significant elements of the terraces include metal fences and handrails, and steel posts supporting shade structures.

=== Landscape Elements ===
Numerous walls and garden features are found throughout the school grounds. A tall, battered stone retaining wall (1926–27) is located to the south and east of the swimming pool. To the west of the dressing shed are early stone-edged garden beds (1926). A low stone wall (c. 1934) is located along the south-west perimeter facing Cowley Street, part of an early garden scheme at the entrance to the school. A concrete retaining wall (1928–9) runs north from the 1928 extension of Block A, intersected by two sets of concrete stairs. Stone-edged garden beds are located on the north side of the teachers rooms and the eastern wing staircase (by 1936).

Large mature trees, including fig trees (ficus, sp.), are located to the east of the swimming pool, north of the 1928 extension to Block A, and to the south and east of the Martin Street entrance.

A playing field on low-lying ground to the east of the main school complex is edged by Norman Creek and vegetation to the southeast, and an arc of school buildings and structures on the higher ground around the western and northern sides.

A large timber Honour Board (1944) and a smaller Honour Board (post-WWII) are hung on the eastern wall of the most easterly ground floor classroom of the 1928 section of Block A. These boards list the names of former students who served in World War II (WWII). A small timber Memorial, south of the large Honour Board, is dedicated to Adrian Blair, a former student.

An early school bell hangs from a corner of the verandah eaves of Block A's western wing.

== Heritage listing ==
Buranda State School was listed on the Queensland Heritage Register on 28 April 2017 having satisfied the following criteria.

The place is important in demonstrating the evolution or pattern of Queensland's history.

Buranda State School (established 1918) is important in demonstrating the evolution of state education and its associated architecture in Queensland. The place retains an excellent, representative example of a standard government design that was an architectural response to prevailing government educational philosophies, honour boards, and an early swimming pool complex, set in landscaped grounds with sporting facilities, retaining walls and mature trees.

The suburban timber school building (1920, 1928) represents the culmination of years of experimentation by the Department of Public Works (DPW) with natural light, classroom size and ventilation.

The early swimming pool, dressing shed and landscaping (1926) reflect the growing popularity of children learning to swim for health and safety reasons. These features comprise a rare remaining 1920s swimming pool complex.

The World War II Honour Boards (1944, post-1945) are important in demonstrating the school community's involvement in a major world event. War memorials, including honour boards, are a tribute from the community to those who served and those who died. They are an important element of Queensland's towns and cities and are also important in demonstrating a common pattern of commemoration across Queensland and Australia.

The large suburban site with mature trees, retaining walls and sporting facilities demonstrates education philosophies which promoted the importance of play and a beautiful environment in the education of children.

The place is important in demonstrating the principal characteristics of a particular class of cultural places.

Buranda State School is important in demonstrating the principal characteristics of a Queensland state school with later modifications. These include: teaching buildings constructed to standard designs; and generous, landscaped sites, with mature trees, assembly and play areas, retaining walls and sporting facilities.

The large suburban timber school building is an excellent, intact example of its type, with its symmetrical plan of three wings, highset form with play space beneath, Dutch-gable and gable roofs, continuous northern verandahs, large banks of south-facing windows providing classrooms with high levels of natural light and ventilation, projecting teachers rooms, single-skin verandah walls, and early joinery including one folding partition.

The swimming pool and dressing shed in their landscaped site are important in demonstrating the principal characteristics of early state school pool complexes in size, form and layout.

The place is important because of its aesthetic significance.

The suburban timber school building at Buranda State School has aesthetic significance identifiable by its symmetrical layout; consistent form; scale; materials; elegant composition; finely crafted timber work; and decorative treatment. Views of the attractive north elevation of the building are obtained from the north.

The place has a strong or special association with a particular community or cultural group for social, cultural or spiritual reasons.

Schools have always played an important part in Queensland communities. They typically retain significant and enduring connections with former pupils, parents, and teachers; provide a venue for social interaction and volunteer work; and are a source of pride, symbolising local progress and aspirations.

Buranda State School has a strong and ongoing association with the Buranda community. It developed from 1918 through the fundraising efforts of the local community and generations of Buranda children have been taught there. The place is important for its contribution to the educational development of its district and is a prominent community focal point and gathering place for social and commemorative events with widespread community support.

== Notable students ==
- Leisha Harvey, Member of the Queensland Legislative Assembly

== See also ==
- History of state education in Queensland
- List of schools in Greater Brisbane
