= PA Hospital busway station =

Bus station in Brisbane, Australia

PA Hospital
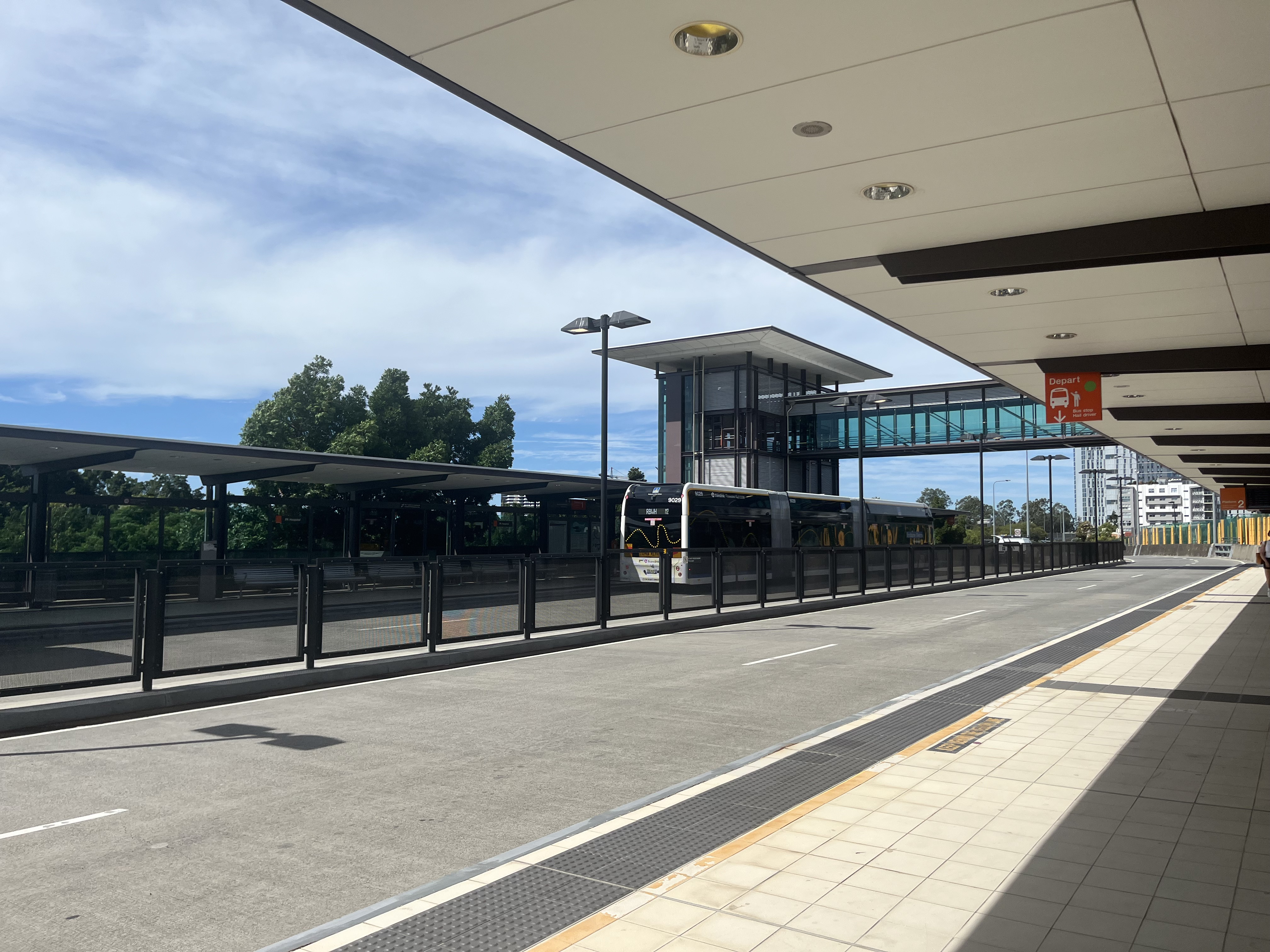

General information
- Location: Ipswich Road, Buranda
- Coordinates: 27°29′48.75″S 153°02′02.37″E
- Owner: Department of Transport & Main Roads
- Operator: Transport for Brisbane
- Line: Eastern
- Platforms: 2 side
- Bus routes: 7

Construction
- Structure type: Elevated
- Accessible: Yes

Other information
- Station code: 010797 (platform 1); 010798 (platform 2)
- Fare zone: Zone 1
- Website: Translink

History
- Opened: 3 August 2009

Services
Preceding station	Translink	Following station
Boggo Road towards UQ Lakes	Eastern Busway	Buranda towards Langlands Park
Location

PA Hospital is a busway station operated by Translink on the Eastern Busway. It opened in 2011 and serves Princess Alexandria Hospital in the Brisbane suburb of Woolloongabba. It is an elevated station, featuring two side platforms.

== Platforms and services ==
PA Hospital platform arrangement
Platform	Line	Direction	Routes	Notes
1	Eastern Busway	Inbound	M2, 19, 29, 104, 105, 107, 110, 112, 113, 139, 169, 172, 179, 203, 209	
2	Eastern Busway	Outbound	M2, 19, 29, 104, 105, 107, 110, 112, 113, 139, 169, 172, 179, 203, 209	
