= South Bank railway station =

South Bank railway station may refer to:

- South Bank railway station (England), a station on the Tees Valley line in North Yorkshire
- South Bank railway station, Brisbane, on the Gold Coast line in Queensland, Australia

== See also ==
- South Bank station
