= Langlands Park (disambiguation) =

Langlands Park may refer to:

- Langlands Park, a rugby league stadium in Brisbane, Australia
- Langlands Park busway station, a bus station in Brisbane, Australia
- Langlands Park, the home ground of Scottish football team Linthouse F.C. until 1894
