= South Bank station =

South Bank station could refer to:

- South Bank station (PAAC), a light rail station in Pittsburgh, Pennsylvania
- South Bank busway station, a bus rapid transit station in Brisbane, Australia
- South Bank railway station, Brisbane, a railway station in Brisbane, Australia
- South Bank railway station (England), a railway station in South Bank, England
