= Boggo Road busway station =

Bus station in Brisbane, Australia

Boggo Road
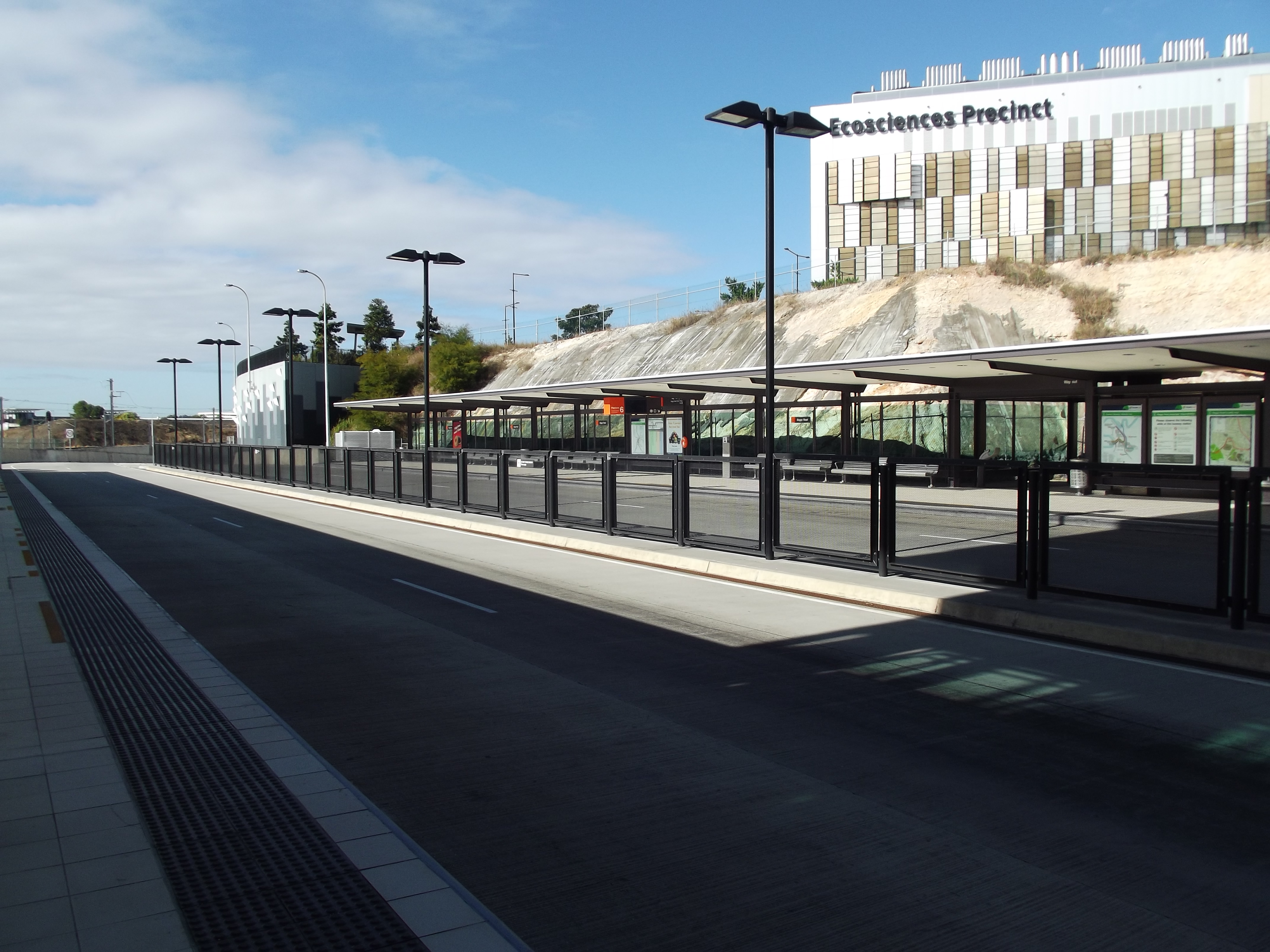

General information
- Location: Boggo Road, Dutton Park
- Coordinates: 27°29′38″S 153°01′49″E
- Owner: Department of Transport & Main Roads
- Operator: Transport for Brisbane
- Line: Eastern
- Platforms: 2
- Bus routes: 7
- Connections: Boggo Road railway station

Construction
- Accessible: Yes

Other information
- Station code: 010795 (platform 5); 010796 (platform 6)
- Fare zone: Zone 1
- Website: Translink

History
- Opened: 3 August 2009

Services
Preceding station	Translink	Following station
UQ Lakes Terminus	Eastern Busway	PA Hospital towards Langlands Park
Location

Boggo Road is a busway station operated by Translink on the Eastern Busway. It opened in 2009 as Park Road as and serves the Brisbane suburb of Dutton Park. It is a ground level station, featuring two side platforms.

The busway platforms at Boggo Road are numbered 5 and 6 to align with the platforms at the adjacent Boggo Road railway station. They will be renumbered to 3 and 4 in 2026 to ensure consistency between above ground rail, below ground rail, and busway platforms.

== Platforms and services ==
Boggo Road platform arrangement
Platform	Line	Type	Destination		Notes
1	Under construction for Cross River Rail				
2	Under construction for Cross River Rail				
3	Eastern	Bus	Outbound	M2, 19, 29, 104, 105, 107, 110, 112, 113, 139, 169, 179, 209,	
4	Eastern	Bus	Inbound	M2, 19, 29, 104, 105, 107, 110, 112, 113, 139, 169, 179, 209,	
5	Beenleigh	Rail	Roma Street (to Ferny Grove line)		
5	Cleveland	Rail	Roma Street (to Shorncliffe line)		
5	Gold Coast	Rail	Roma Street (to Airport line)		
6	Beenleigh	Rail	Roma Street (to Ferny Grove line)		
7	Cleveland	Rail	Roma Street (to Shorncliffe line)		
8	Beenleigh	Rail	Beenleigh		
8	Cleveland	Rail	Cleveland		
8	Gold Coast	Rail	Varsity Lakes		

== Future ==
The underground platforms of Boggo Road railway station, part of the Cross River Rail project, is due to open in 2029 and will provide interchange with the existing busway station.
