= Buranda busway station =

Bus station in Brisbane, Australia

Buranda
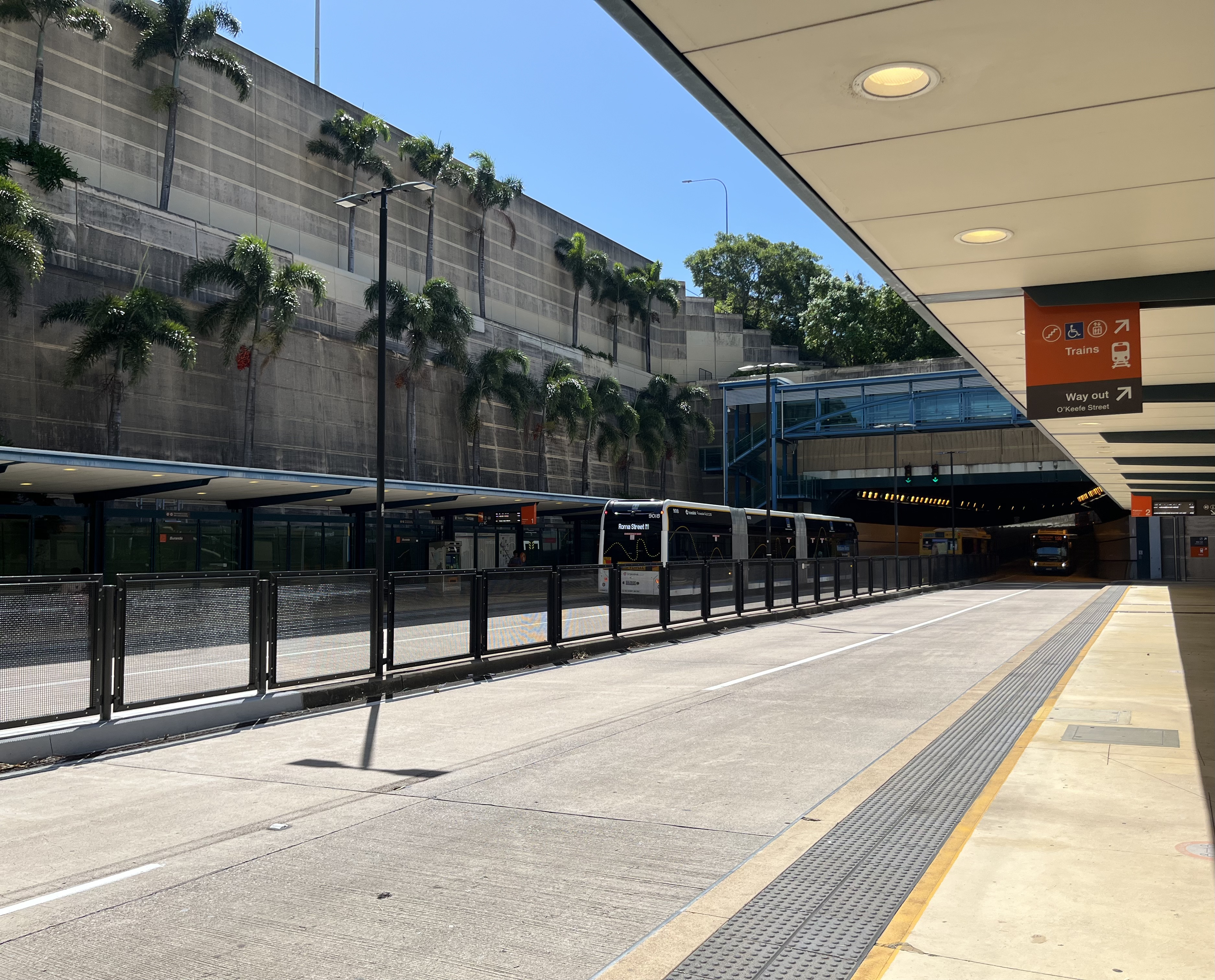
- Buranda busway station in February 2026

General information
- Location: O'Keefe Street, Buranda
- Coordinates: 27°29′50″S 153°02′22″E
- Owner: Department of Transport & Main Roads
- Lines: Eastern; South East
- Platforms: 2
- Bus routes: 46
- Bus operators: Transport for Brisbane; Clarks Logan City Bus Service; Transdev Queensland; Park Ridge Transit; Mt Gravatt Bus Service
- Connections: Buranda railway station

Construction
- Structure type: Below ground
- Accessible: Yes

Other information
- Station code: 010814 (platform 1); 010813 (platform 2)
- Fare zone: Zone 1
- Website: Translink

History
- Opened: 30 April 2001; 25 years ago

Services
Preceding station	Translink	Following station
Mater Hill towards King George Square	South East Busway	Greenslopes towards Springwood
PA Hospital towards UQ Lakes	Eastern Busway	Stones Corner towards Langlands Park
Location

Buranda is a busway station operated by Translink on the Eastern Busway and the South East Busway. It opened in 2001 and serves the Brisbane suburb of Buranda. It is a below ground station, featuring two side platforms.

On 29 August 2011, Buranda became a junction station when the Eastern Busway was extended to Langlands Park.

It is served by 46 routes operated by Transport for Brisbane, Clarks Logan City Bus Service, Transdev Queensland, Park Ridge Transit and Mt Gravatt Bus Service as part of the Translink network.

== Transport links ==
Buranda station is located adjacent to the Buranda railway station on the Cleveland line.

== Platforms and services ==
Buranda platform arrangement
Platform	Line	Type	Destination		Notes
1	Cleveland	Rail	Cleveland		
2	Cleveland	Rail	Roma Street (to Shorncliffe line)		
3	Eastern Busway; South East Busway	Bus	Outbound	M1, 26, 77, 114, 119, 120, 121, 134, 139, 169, 171, 172, 176, 179, 180, 181, 183, 189, 201, 202, 203, 205, 206, 208, 209, 222, 243, 251, 261, 265, 267, 273, 275, 276, 279, 281, 299, 546, 551, 555, 561, 569, 573, 575, 577, 579, 581, 844, 860	Not all routes depart from both platforms.
4	Eastern Busway; South East Busway	Bus	Inbound	M1, 26, 77, 114, 119, 120, 121, 134, 139, 169, 171, 172, 176, 179, 180, 181, 183, 189, 201, 202, 203, 205, 206, 208, 209, 222, 243, 251, 261, 265, 267, 273, 275, 276, 279, 281, 299, 546, 551, 555, 561, 569, 573, 575, 577, 579, 581, 844, 860	Not all routes depart from both platforms.

The station also features car parking facilities. Platforms 1 and 2 are located at the adjacent Buranda railway station.
