= Coorparoo railway station =

Railway station in Queensland, Australia

Coorparoo
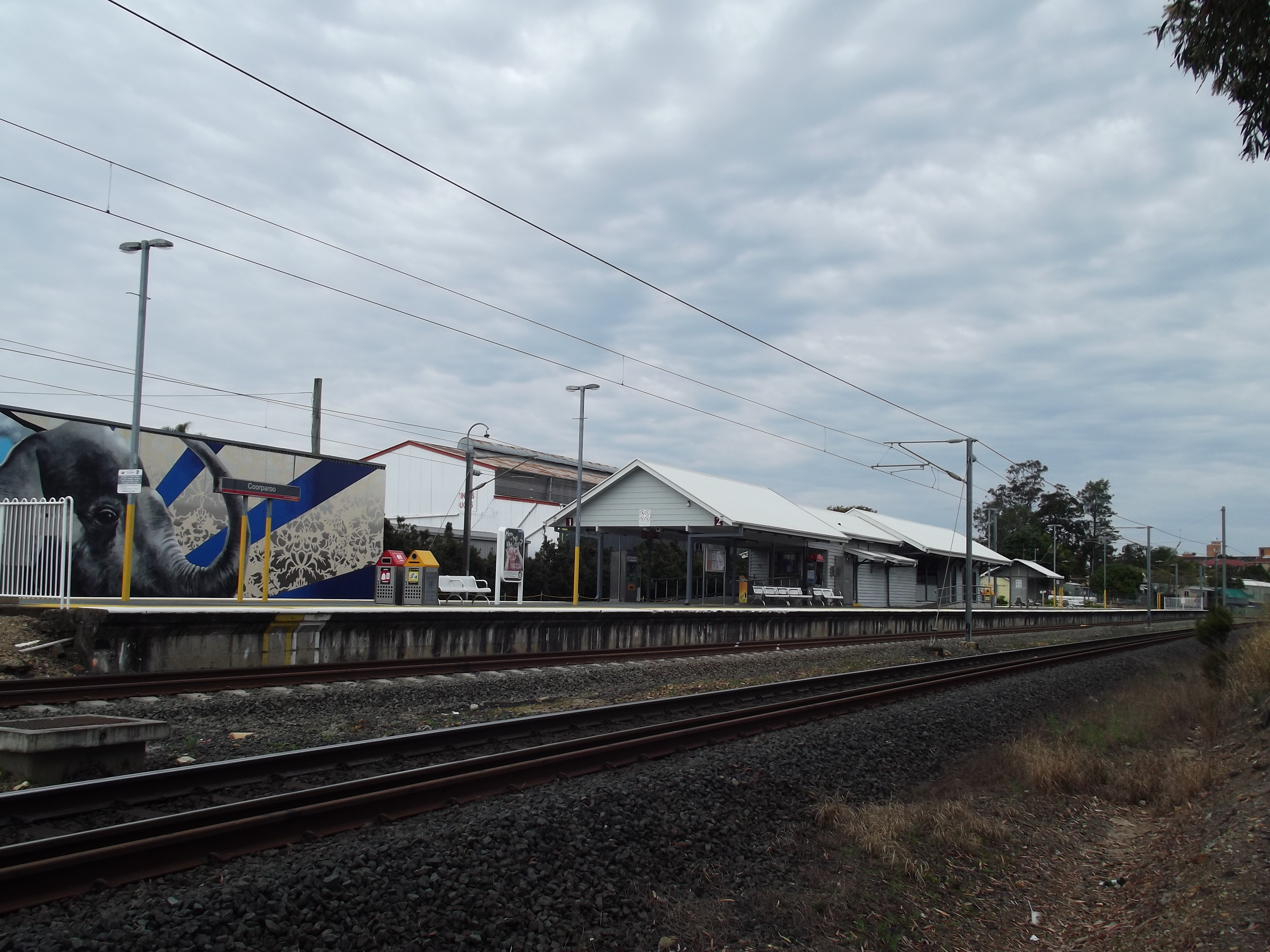
- Westbound view of Platform 1, August 2012

General information
- Location: Cavendish Road, Coorparoo
- Coordinates: 27°29′23″S 153°03′19″E
- Owner: Queensland Rail
- Operator: Queensland Rail
- Line: T4 Cleveland
- Distance: 7.87 kilometres from Central
- Platforms: 2 (1 island)
- Tracks: 3

Construction
- Structure type: Ground
- Parking: 148 bays
- Cycle facilities: Yes
- Accessible: Yes

Other information
- Station code: 600251 (platform 1); 600250 (platform 2)
- Fare zone: Zone 1
- Website: Queensland Rail

Services
Preceding station	Queensland Rail	Following station
Buranda towards Shorncliffe via Roma Street	T4 Cleveland line	Norman Park towards Cleveland
Location

Coorparoo is a railway station operated by Queensland Rail on the Cleveland line. It opened in 1889 and serves the Brisbane suburb of Coorparoo. It is a ground level station, featuring one island platform with two faces

== Services ==
Coorparoo is served by Cleveland line services from Shorncliffe, Northgate, Doomben and Bowen Hills to Cannon Hill, Manly and Cleveland.

== Platforms and services ==
Coorparoo platform arrangement
Platform	Line	Destination	Notes
1	T4 Cleveland	Roma Street (to Shorncliffe line)	
2	T4 Cleveland	Cleveland	
