= Eastern Busway =

Eastern Busway may refer to:

- Eastern Busway, Brisbane, in Brisbane, Australia
- Eastern Busway, Auckland, in Auckland, New Zealand
- Eastern Busway, Melbourne, in Melbourne, Australia
