= Mater Hill busway station =

Bus station in Brisbane, Australia

Mater Hill
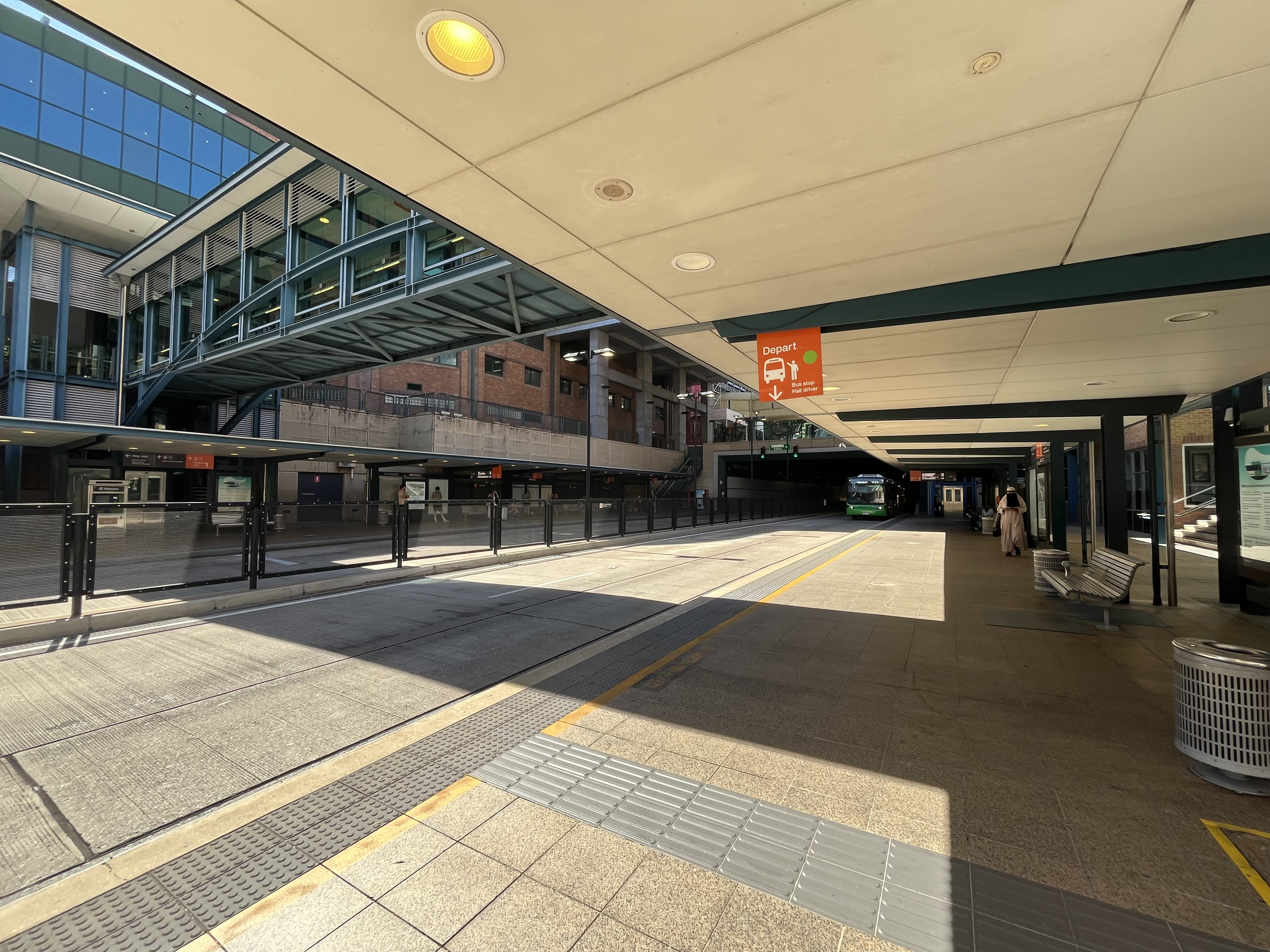
- Mater Hill busway station in April 2026

General information
- Location: Water Street, South Brisbane
- Coordinates: 27°29′05.30″S 153°01′38.93″E
- Owner: Department of Transport & Main Roads
- Line: South East Busway
- Platforms: 2 side
- Bus routes: 25
- Bus operators: Transport for Brisbane; Clarks Logan City Bus Service

Construction
- Structure type: Ground level
- Accessible: Yes

Other information
- Station code: 019051 (platform 1); 019063 (platform 2)
- Fare zone: Zone 1
- Website: Translink

History
- Opened: 23 October 2000

Services
Preceding station	Translink	Following station
South Bank towards King George Square	South East Busway	Woolloongabba Terminus
South Bank towards King George Square	South East Busway	Buranda towards Springwood
Location

Mater Hill is a busway station operated by Translink on the South East Busway. It opened in 2000 and serves the Brisbane suburb of South Brisbane, and the Mater Health precinct. It is a ground level station, featuring two side platforms.

== Platforms and services ==
Mater Hill platform arrangement
Platform	Line	Direction	Routes	Notes
1	South East Busway	Inbound	M1, M2, 61, 100, 107, 116, 120, 130, 140, 150, 180, 200, 210, 212, 214, 215, 220, 222, 230, 235, 333, 555, 872, 875, 882	
2	South East Busway	Outbound	M1, M2, 61, 100, 107, 116, 120, 130, 140, 150, 180, 200, 210, 212, 214, 215, 220, 222, 230, 235, 333, 555, 872, 875, 882	
