= Buranda railway station =

Railway station in Queensland, Australia

Buranda
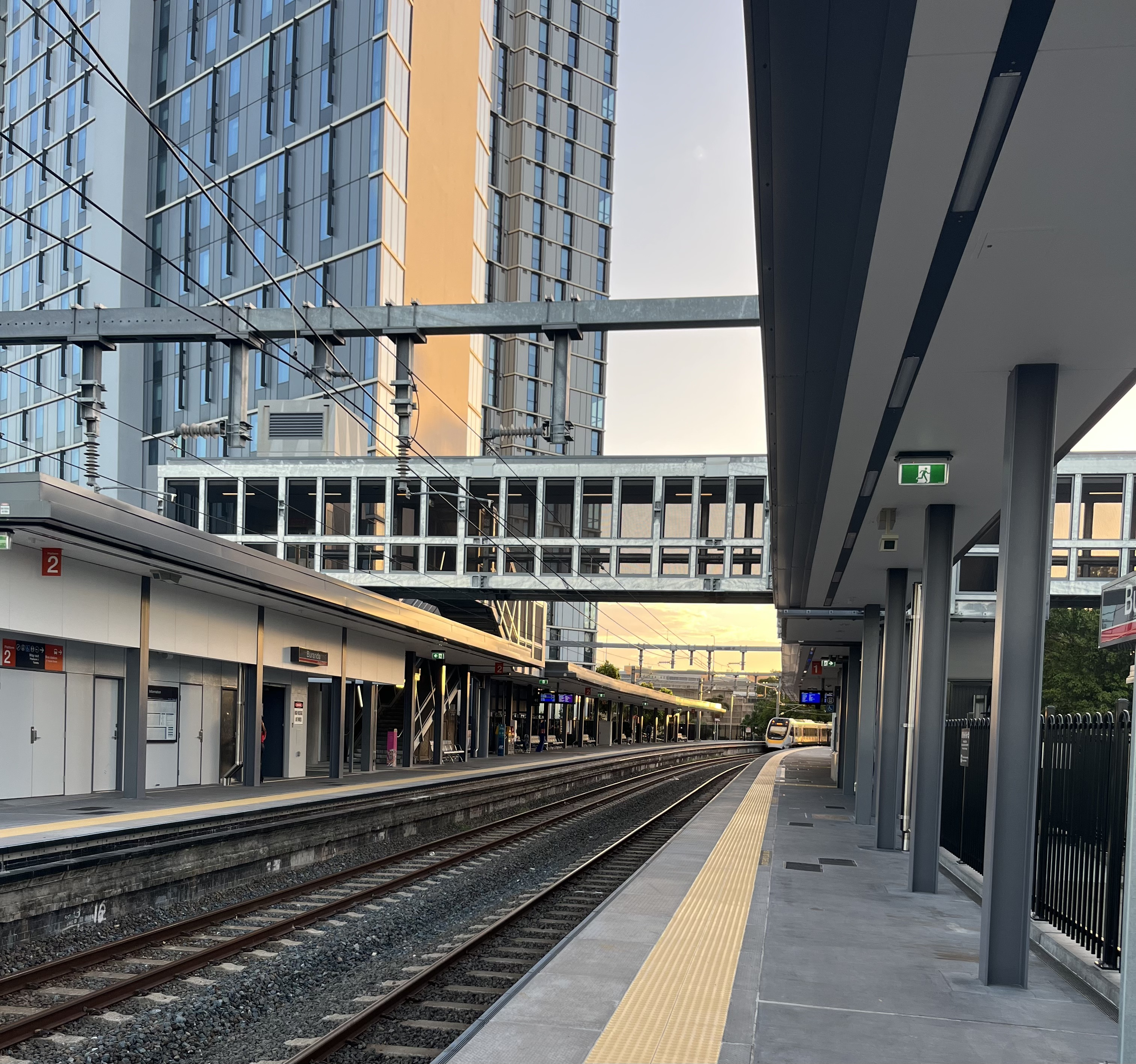
- Westbound view from Platform 1 in March 2026

General information
- Location: Gillingham Street, Woolloongabba
- Coordinates: 27.4965°S 153.0405°E
- Owner: Queensland Rail
- Operator: Queensland Rail
- Line: Cleveland
- Distance: 6.20 kilometres from Central
- Platforms: 2 side
- Tracks: 3
- Connections: Buranda busway station

Construction
- Structure type: Ground
- Parking: 30 bays

Other information
- Status: Staffed
- Station code: 600248 (platform 1); 600249 (platform 2)
- Fare zone: Zone 1
- Website: Queensland Rail

History
- Opened: 1889
- Rebuilt: 30 June 2025
- Former names: Logan Road

Services
Preceding station	Queensland Rail	Following station
Boggo Road towards Shorncliffe via Roma Street	Cleveland line	Coorparoo towards Cleveland
Location

Buranda is a railway station operated by Queensland Rail on the Cleveland line. It opened in 1889 and serves the locality of Buranda in the Brisbane suburb of Woolloongabba. It is a ground level station, featuring two side platforms.

== History ==
Buranda station opened in 1889 as Logan Road station, being renamed Buranda in July 1917.

On 15 July 1996, the Fisherman Islands line to the Port of Brisbane opened to the north of the station.

In the early hours of 29 March 2009, the main station building on platform one was destroyed by fire. A 17-year-old man was later charged with one count of arson following the incident.

From 8 January 2024, the station was temporarily closed for an accessibility upgrade. This upgrade included additions of lifts, raised platforms, hearing loops and disability compliant ticket windows. It reopened on 30 June 2025.

In June 2026, the platforms at the adjacent busway station were renumbered as 3 and 4, bringing them in line with the platforms at the railway station.

== Platforms and services ==
Buranda platform arrangement
Platform	Line	Type	Destination		Notes
1	Cleveland	Rail	Cleveland		
2	Cleveland	Rail	Roma Street (to Shorncliffe line)		
3	Eastern Busway; South East Busway	Bus	Outbound	M1, 26, 77, 114, 119, 120, 121, 134, 139, 169, 171, 172, 176, 179, 180, 181, 183, 189, 201, 202, 203, 205, 206, 208, 209, 222, 243, 251, 261, 265, 267, 273, 275, 276, 279, 281, 299, 546, 551, 555, 561, 569, 573, 575, 577, 579, 581, 844, 860	Not all routes depart from both platforms.
4	Eastern Busway; South East Busway	Bus	Inbound	M1, 26, 77, 114, 119, 120, 121, 134, 139, 169, 171, 172, 176, 179, 180, 181, 183, 189, 201, 202, 203, 205, 206, 208, 209, 222, 243, 251, 261, 265, 267, 273, 275, 276, 279, 281, 299, 546, 551, 555, 561, 569, 573, 575, 577, 579, 581, 844, 860	Not all routes depart from both platforms.

Platforms 3 and 4 are located at the adjacent Buranda busway station. The station is served by Cleveland line

== Transport links ==
Adjacent to the station lies Buranda busway station that is served by Transport for Brisbane bus services.
