= Stones Corner busway station =

Bus station in Brisbane, Australia

Stones Corner
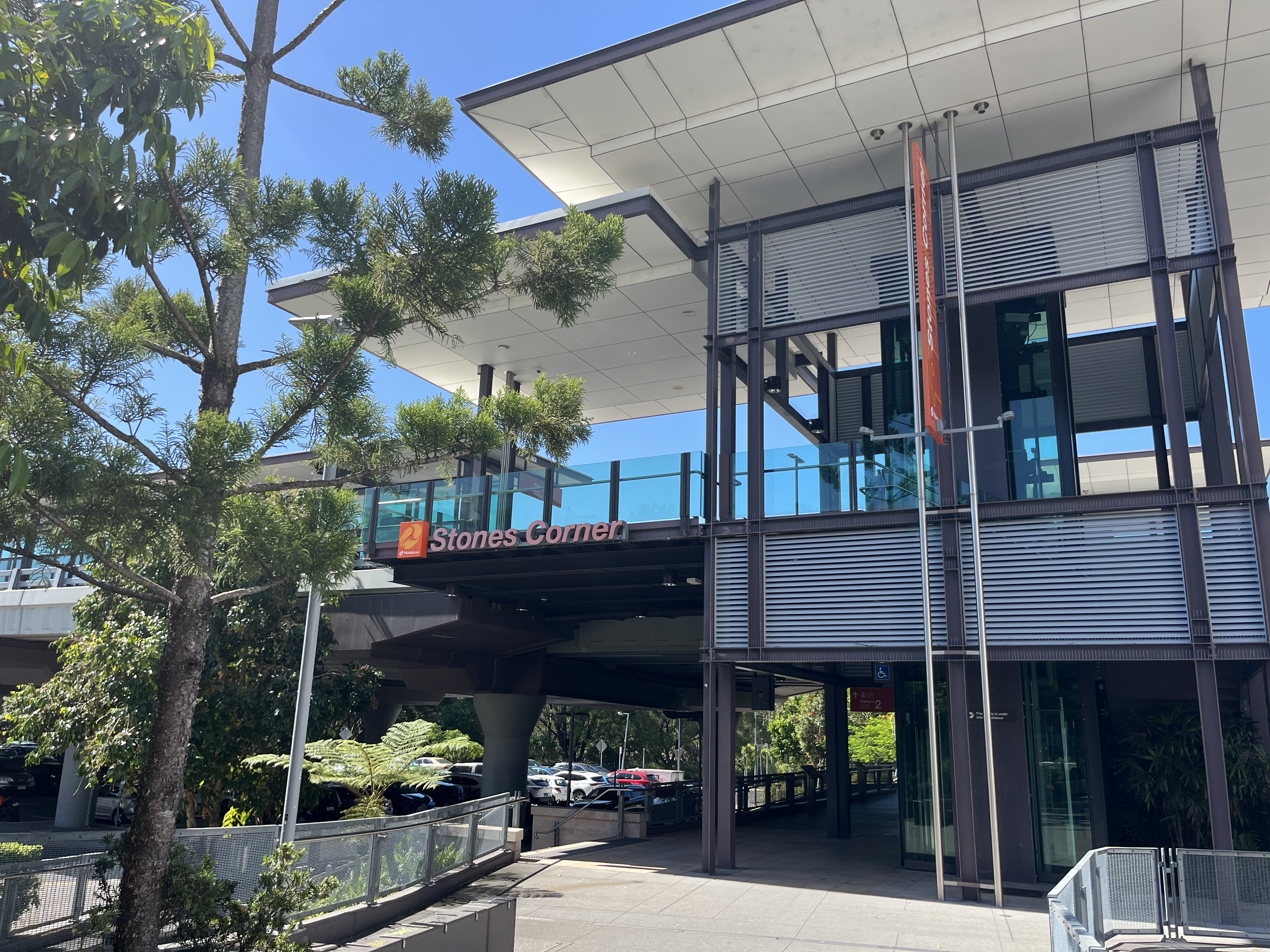
- Stones Corner busway station in February 2026

General information
- Location: Old Cleveland Road, Stones Corner
- Coordinates: 27.497823138448336°S 153.0443722471364°E
- Owner: Department of Transport & Main Roads
- Operator: Transport for Brisbane
- Line: Eastern
- Platforms: 2 side
- Bus routes: 7

Construction
- Structure type: Elevated
- Accessible: Yes

Other information
- Station code: 003091 (platform 1); 003072 (platform 2)
- Fare zone: Zone 1
- Website: Translink

History
- Opened: 29 August 2011; 15 years ago

Services
Preceding station	Translink	Following station
Buranda towards UQ Lakes	Eastern Busway	Langlands Park Terminus
Location

Stones Corner is a busway station operated by Translink on the Eastern Busway. It opened in 2011 and serves the Brisbane suburb of Stones Corner. It is an elevated station, featuring two side platforms.

== Platforms and services ==
Stones Corner platform arrangement
Platform	Line	Direction	Routes	Notes
1	Eastern Busway	Inbound	61, 201, 203, 206, 209, 217, 222	
2	Eastern Busway	Outbound	61, 201, 203, 206, 209, 217, 222	

The station also features a bike rack and car parking facilities.
