= Woolloongabba busway station =

Bus station in Brisbane, Australia

Woolloongabba
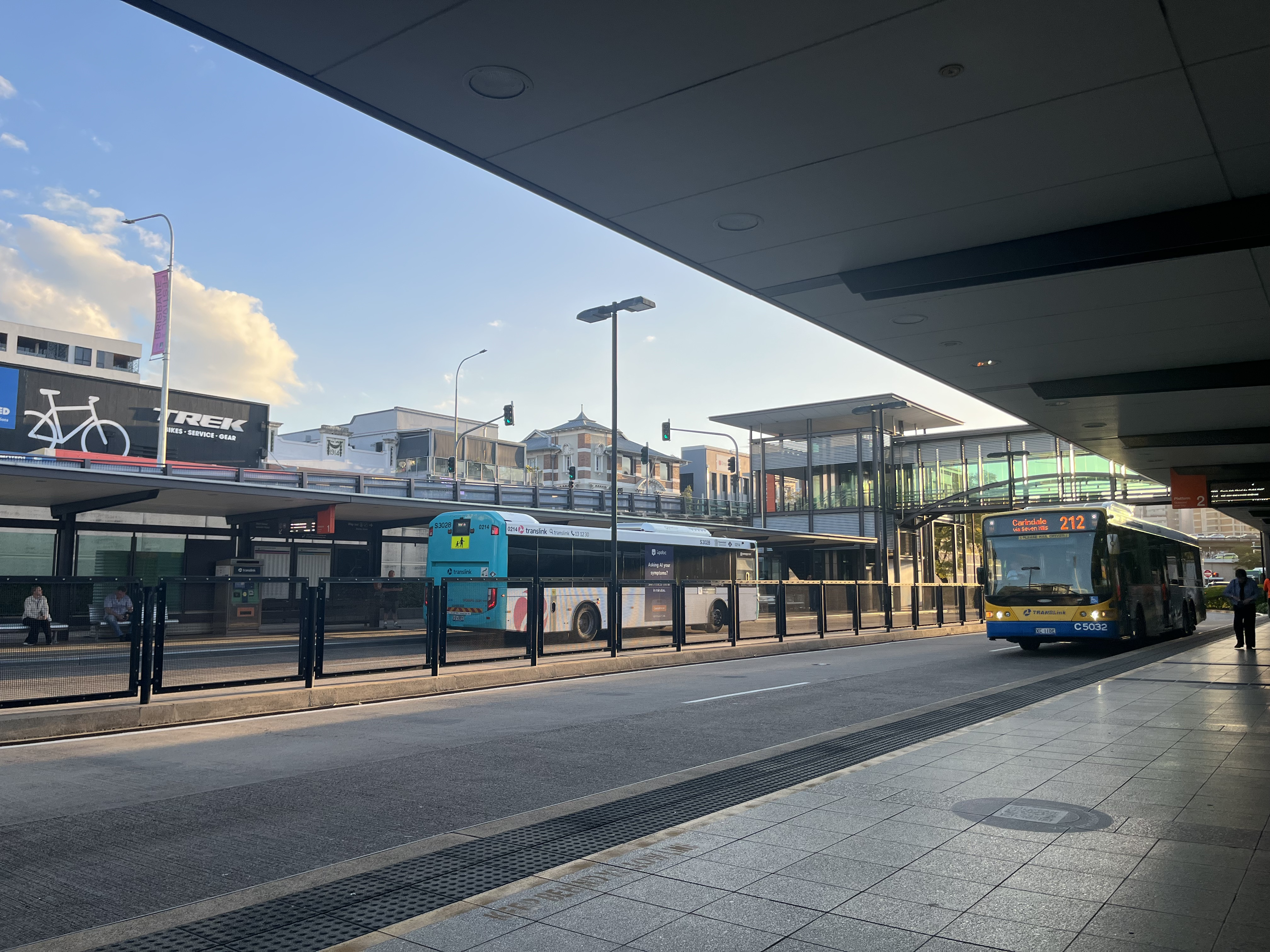

General information
- Location: Stanley Street, Woolloongabba
- Coordinates: 27°29′10″S 153°02′05.3″E
- Owner: Department of Transport & Main Roads
- Operator: Transport for Brisbane
- Line: South East
- Platforms: 2
- Bus routes: 23
- Bus operators: Transport for Brisbane

Construction
- Structure type: Ground level
- Accessible: Yes

Other information
- Station code: 019050 (platform 1); 019062 (platform 2)
- Fare zone: Zone 1
- Website: Translink

History
- Opened: 13 September 2000

Services
Preceding station	Translink	Following station
Mater Hill towards King George Square	South East Busway	Terminus
Location

Woolloongabba is a busway station operated by Translink on the South East Busway. It opened in 2000 and serves the Brisbane suburb of Woolloongabba. It is a ground level station, featuring two side platforms.

== History ==
It opened on 13 September 2000 when the first section of the South East Busway opened from Melbourne Street, South Brisbane, to coincide with the start of the 2000 Olympic football tournament for which some matches were held in Brisbane. It initially opened for outbound services only, with inbound services commencing on 23 October 2000.

It is on a branch of the South East Busway, the next stations of which are Mater Hill or Buranda. It is served by 23 routes operated by Transport for Brisbane as part of the Translink network.

It was proposed to build a railway station adjacent to the busway station, part of the abandoned BaT Tunnel project. This project was revived as Cross River Rail, with Woolloongabba railway station due to open in 2029.

== Platforms and services ==
Woolloongabba platform arrangement
Platform	Line	Direction	Routes	Notes
1	South East Busway	Inbound	29, 61, 100, 125, 175, 185, 200, 204, 210, 212, 215, 220, 230, 234, 235, 333, 340	
2	South East Busway	Outbound	29, 61, 100, 125, 175, 185, 200, 204, 210, 212, 215, 220, 230, 234, 235, 333, 340	
