= South Bank busway station =

Bus station in Brisbane, Australia

South Bank
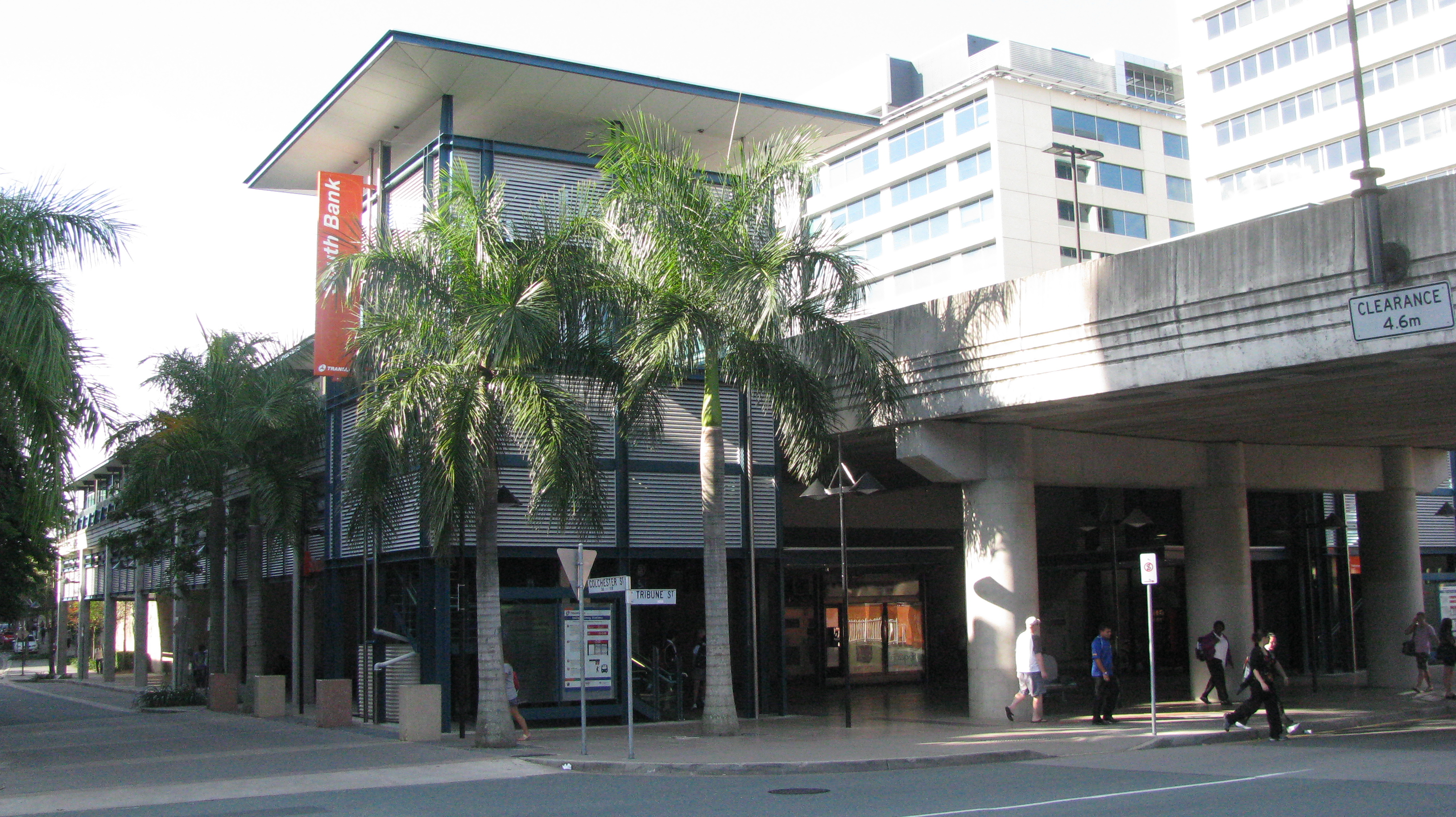
- South Bank busway station in November 2010

General information
- Location: Tribune Street, South Brisbane
- Coordinates: 27°28′51.3″S 153°01′20″E
- Owner: Department of Transport & Main Roads
- Line: South East
- Platforms: 2 side
- Bus routes: 22
- Bus operators: Transport for Brisbane; Clarks Logan City Bus Service
- Connections: South Bank railway station

Construction
- Structure type: Elevated
- Accessible: Yes

Other information
- Station code: 019052 (platform 1); 019064 (platform 2)
- Fare zone: Zone 1
- Website: Translink

History
- Opened: 23 October 2000

Services
Preceding station	Translink	Following station
Cultural Centre towards King George Square	South East Busway	Mater Hill towards Springwood
Location

South Bank is a busway station operated by Translink on the South East Busway. It opened in 2000 and serves the Brisbane suburb of South Brisbane. It is an elevated station, featuring two side platforms. South Bank railway station is located adjacent to the busway station.

== Platforms and services ==
South Bank platform arrangement
Platform	Line	Type	Destination		Notes
1	Beenleigh	Rail	Beenleigh		
1	Cleveland	Rail	Cleveland		
1	Gold Coast	Rail	Varsity Lakes		
2	Beenleigh	Rail	Roma Street (to Ferny Grove line)		
2	Cleveland	Rail	Roma Street (to Shorncliffe line		
2	Gold Coast	Rail	Roma Street (to Airport line)		
3	Beenleigh	Rail	Roma Street (to Ferny Grove line)		Early morning only
3	Beenleigh	Rail	Beenleigh		Saturday services only
3	Gold Coast	Rail	Roma Street (to Airport line)		Peak hours only
3	Gold Coast	Rail	Roma Street (To Doomben line)		Morning peak only
3	Gold Coast	Rail	Varsity Lakes		Peak hours only
4	South East	Bus	Outbound	M1, M2, 61, 100, 107, 116, 120, 130, 140, 150, 180, 200, 210, 212, 214, 215, 220, 222, 230, 235, 333, 555, 872, 875, 882	
5	South East	Bus	Inbound	M1, M2, 61, 100, 107, 116, 120, 130, 140, 150, 180, 200, 210, 212, 214, 215, 220, 222, 230, 235, 333, 555, 872, 875, 882	

Platforms 1 through 3 are located at the South Bank railway station.
