= Buranda, Queensland =

Buranda
- Suburb
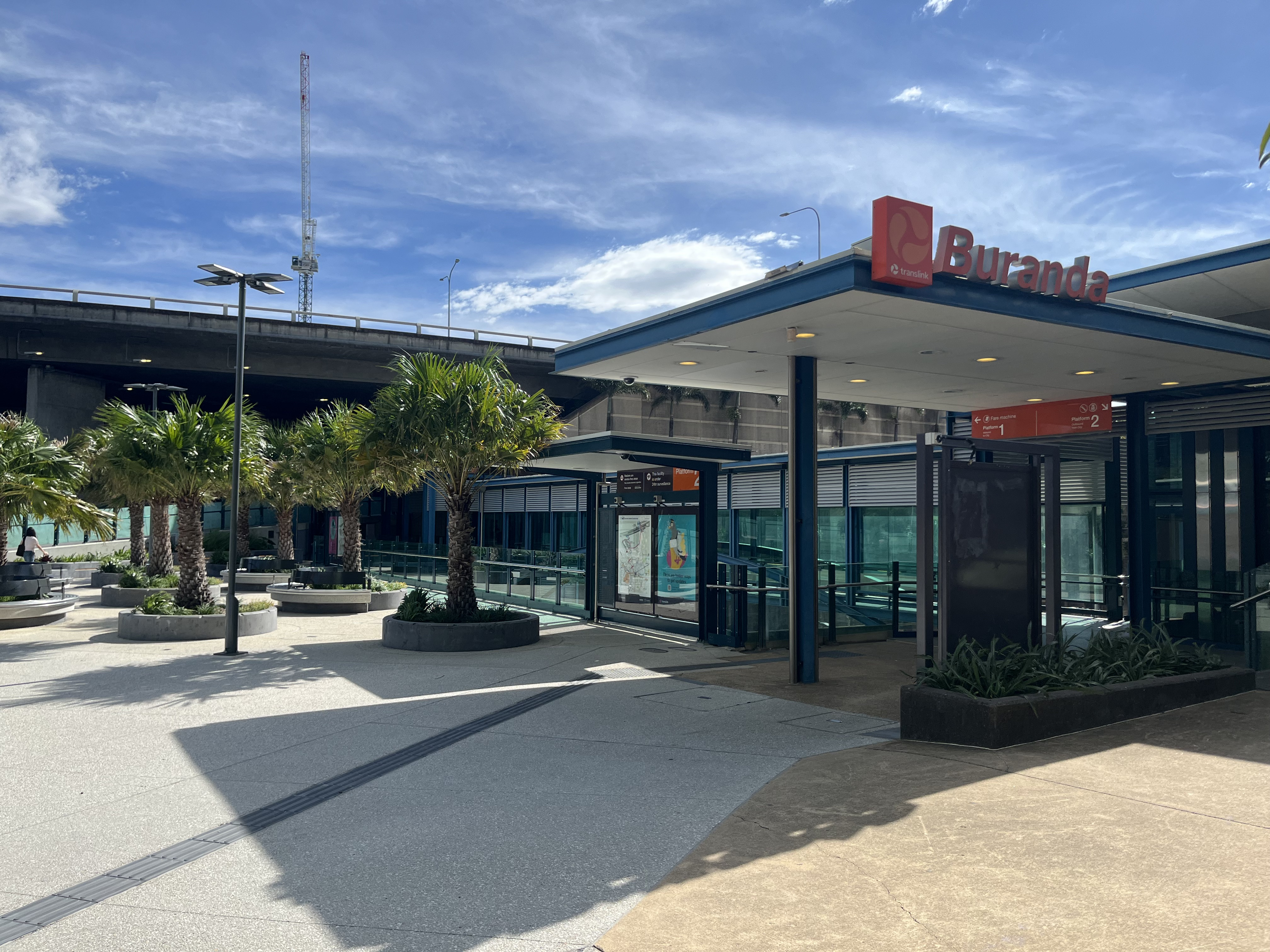
- Buranda busway station entrance

- Coordinates: 27.500°S 153.033°E
- Country: Australia
- State: Queensland
- City: Brisbane
- LGA: City of Brisbane
- Location: 5.0 km (3.1 mi) S of Brisbane CBD
- Established: 1921

Government
  - State electorate: Greenslopes
  - Federal division: Griffith

Buranda is a neighbourhood in the southern Brisbane suburbs of Greenslopes and Woolloongabba in Brisbane, the capital of Queensland, Australia.

== Geography ==
The location is an important transport hub for southern Brisbane. Logan Road and Ipswich Road pass through the area, and as does the South East Busway. The Pacific Motorway passes through the area. Buranda is serviced by the Buranda railway station and the PA Hospital busway station. The neighbourhood also has a local shopping centre, Buranda Village.

== History ==
In 2008, it was announced that Buranda would become a transit-oriented development (TOD) area, known as Buranda Village. It was to include 2 office buildings of 6 storeys and 23-storeys, five apartment buildings ranging from seven-storeys to the 32-storey and a 15-storey boutique hotel.

== Heritage listings ==
Buranda has the following heritage-listed sites:

- Buranda State School, 24 Cowley Street (27.4967°S 153.0438°E)
- Buranda Ventilation Shaft, 264 Ipswich Road (27.50096°S 153.03556°E)

== Education ==
Buranda State School is a government primary (Prep–6) school for boys and girls at 24 Cowley Street (27.4971°S 153.0426°E). In 2018, the school had an enrolment of 247 students with 20 teachers (14 full-time equivalent) and 10 non-teaching staff (8 full-time equivalent).

The nearest government secondary school is Brisbane South State Secondary College in Dutton Park to the west.

== See also ==
- TransApex
- Transport in Brisbane
