= South Bank railway station, Brisbane =

Railway station in Queensland, Australia

South Bank
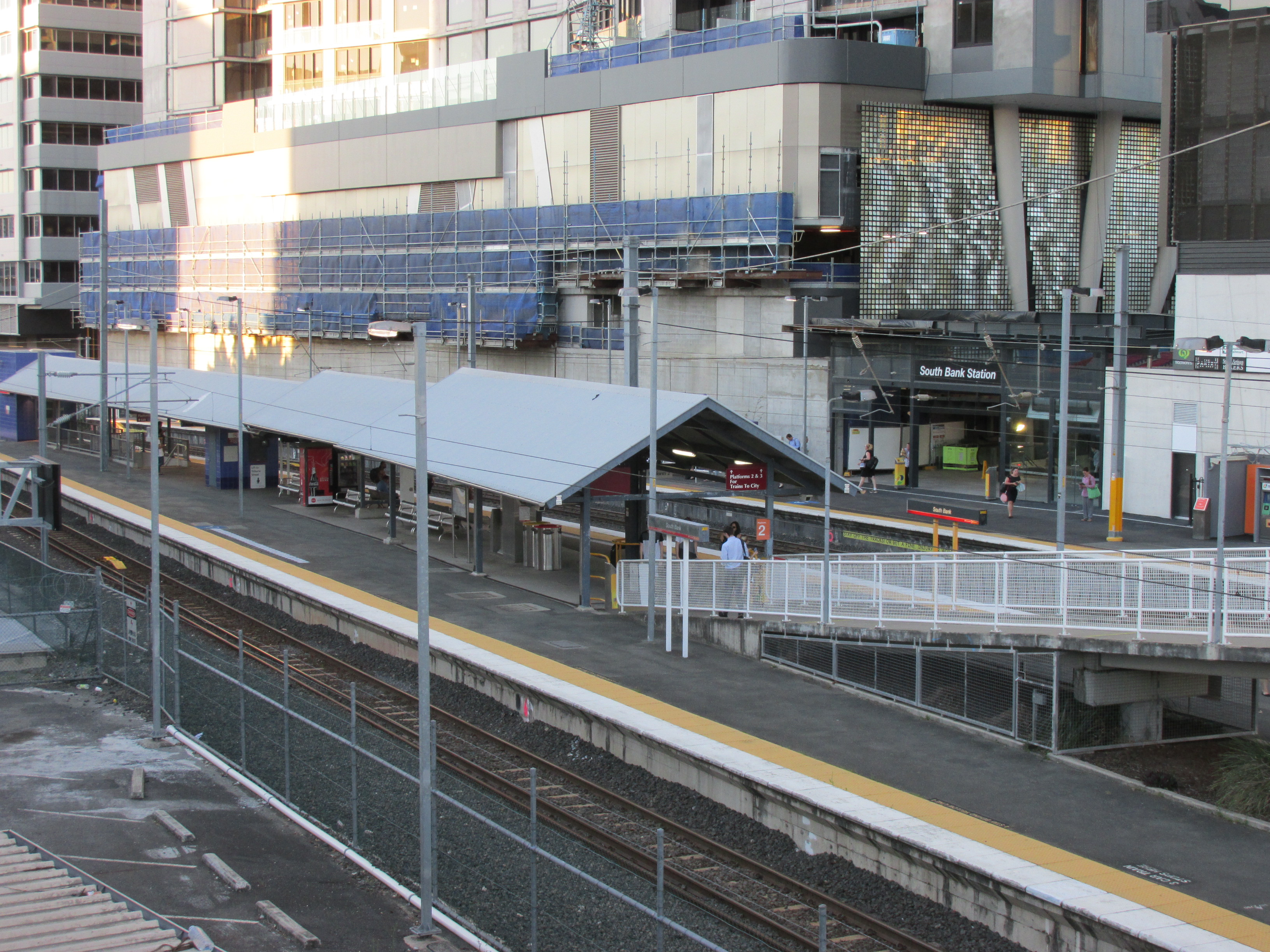
- North-west bound view of Platform 1 in November 2017

General information
- Location: Grey Street, South Brisbane
- Coordinates: 27°28′55″S 153°01′23″E
- Owner: Queensland Rail
- Operator: Queensland Rail
- Lines: T6 Beenleigh; T4 Cleveland; T5 Varsity Lakes
- Distance: 3.55 kilometres from Central
- Platforms: 3 (1 side, 1 island)
- Tracks: 3
- Connections: South Bank busway station

Construction
- Structure type: Elevated
- Accessible: Yes

Other information
- Station code: 600006 (platform 1); 600188 (platform 2); 600189 (platform 3)
- Fare zone: Zone 1

History
- Opened: 21 December 1893; 132 years ago
- Rebuilt: December 2022 (Platform 1 only)
- Former names: Vulture Street

Services
Preceding station	Queensland Rail	Following station
South Brisbane towards Ferny Grove	Beenleigh line	Boggo Road towards Beenleigh
South Brisbane towards Shorncliffe	Cleveland line	Boggo Road towards Cleveland
South Brisbane towards Domestic Airport	Varsity Lakes line	Boggo Road towards Varsity Lakes
Location

South Bank is a railway station operated by Queensland Rail on the Beenleigh, Cleveland and Gold Coast lines. It opened in 1893 as Vulture Street and serves the South Brisbane area. It is an elevated station, featuring one island platform with two faces and one side platform.

== History ==
South Bank station opened as Vulture Street, after the adjoining street. The station provides access to the park and cinemas, and the Grey Street retail and dining precinct.

In September 1930, the standard gauge New South Wales North Coast line opened to the west of the station. In 1995, as part of the construction of the Gold Coast line, the standard gauge line was converted to dual gauge.

On 27 April 2001, the station was renamed South Bank (Vulture Street), later being simplified to South Bank in reference to its proximity to the South Bank Parklands. At the same time a platform face was added on the dual gauge line.

In December 2013, work commenced on a transit oriented development at South Bank, which will see the station covered with office and apartment buildings. The new apartments are called Southpoint. The proposal was announced by the Queensland Government in November 2007.

Between late 2021 and 2022, platform 1 received an accessibility rebuild, including a full-length raised platform, platform shelters and seating. The construction completed in December 2022. Platform 2 and 3 remained untouched, in which a boarding ramp is still provided for wheelchair passengers.

In June 2026, the platforms at the adjacent South Bank busway station were renumbered as 4 and 5, bringing them in line with the railway station.

== Platforms and services ==
South Bank platform arrangement
Platform	Line	Type	Destination		Notes
1	Beenleigh	Rail	Beenleigh		
1	Cleveland	Rail	Cleveland		
1	Gold Coast	Rail	Varsity Lakes		
2	Beenleigh	Rail	Roma Street (to Ferny Grove line)		
2	Cleveland	Rail	Roma Street (to Shorncliffe line		
2	Gold Coast	Rail	Roma Street (to Airport line)		
3	Beenleigh	Rail	Roma Street (to Ferny Grove line)		Early morning only
3	Beenleigh	Rail	Beenleigh		Saturday services only
3	Gold Coast	Rail	Roma Street (to Airport line)		Peak hours only
3	Gold Coast	Rail	Roma Street (To Doomben line)		Morning peak only
3	Gold Coast	Rail	Varsity Lakes		Peak hours only
4	South East	Bus	Outbound	M1, M2, 61, 100, 107, 116, 120, 130, 140, 150, 180, 200, 210, 212, 214, 215, 220, 222, 230, 235, 333, 555, 872, 875, 882	
5	South East	Bus	Inbound	M1, M2, 61, 100, 107, 116, 120, 130, 140, 150, 180, 200, 210, 212, 214, 215, 220, 222, 230, 235, 333, 555, 872, 875, 882	

Platforms 4 and 5 are located at the South Bank busway station. South Bank station is served by Beenleigh, Cleveland and Gold Coast line services.

== Transport links ==
Adjacent to the station lies the South Bank busway station that is served by Transport for Brisbane bus services.
