= Eastern Busway, Brisbane =

Bus route in Brisbane, Australia

Coordinates: 27°29′51.72″S 153°01′33.08″E

Eastern Busway

Overview
- System: Translink
- Operator: Transport for Brisbane
- Status: Open
- Began service: 3 August 2009

Route
- Start: UQ Lakes
- Via: Old Cleveland Road
- End: Langlands Park
- Stations: 7 (6 busway stations) (1 bus stop)

The Eastern Busway is a bus-only road running from the University of Queensland to Langlands Park in Queensland, Australia.

== History ==
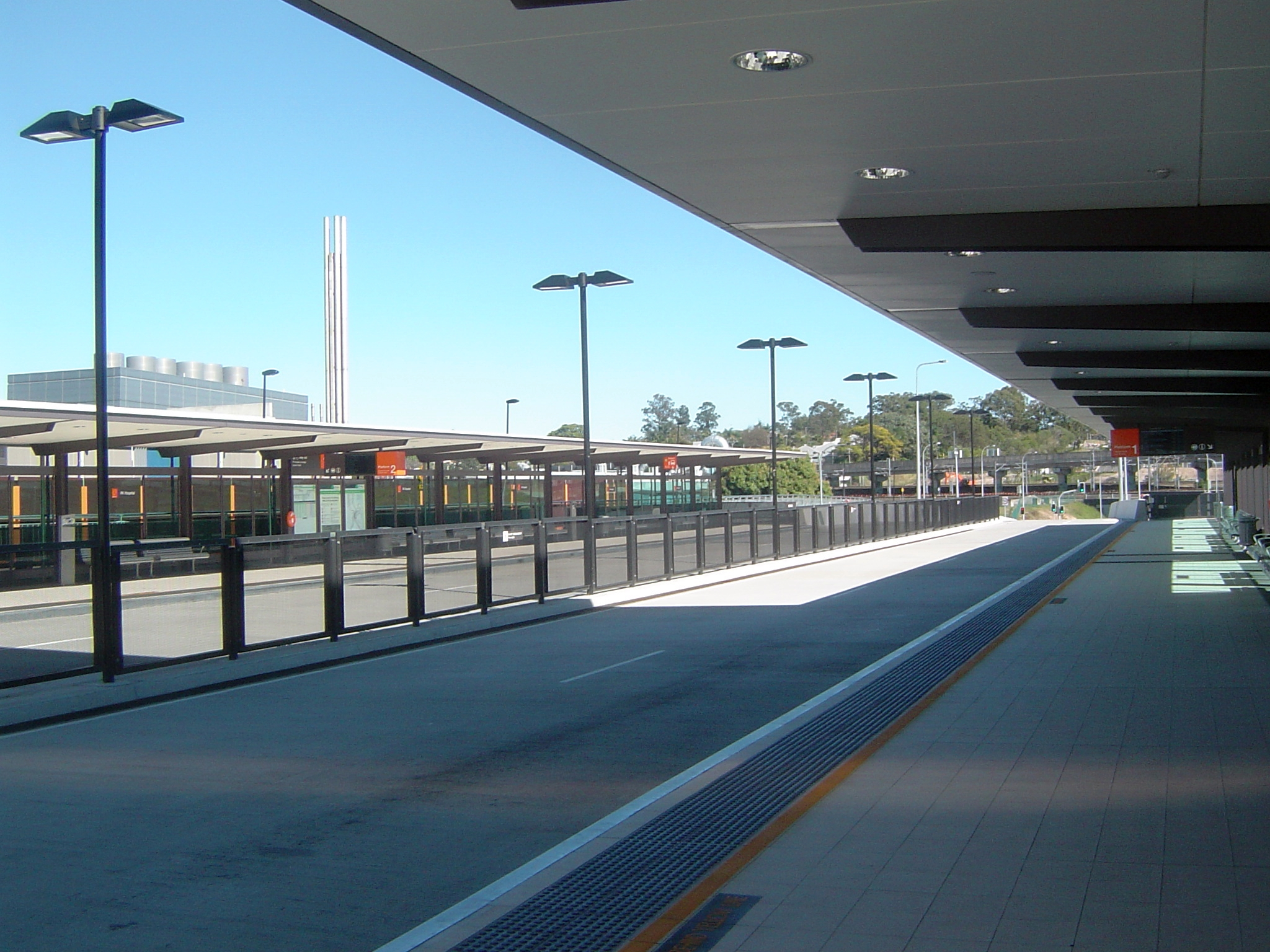
PA Hospital busway station

Construction began in April 2007 on the 1.5 kilometres (0.93 mi) UQ Lakes to Buranda section with it opening on 3 August 2009. The UQ Lakes to Buranda section of the busway was built under an alliance with Thiess, Sinclair Knight Merz and the Department of Transport and Main Roads. It included a 640-metre-long (2,100 ft) tunnel built under the old Boggo Road Gaol. Tunnelling was done with a Voest-Alpine Industrieanlagenbau AM105 roadheader machine. A second tunnel passes under the Pacific Motorway to connect with the South East Busway at Buranda.

On 1 December 2008, a worker was killed in an accident during construction of the section near the Princess Alexandra Hospital. The accident occurred when an 18 tonne concrete bridge beam fell from its pier supports. The accident led to the suspension of construction for several days and charges being laid against construction contractor Theiss in relation to alleged breaches of the Workplace Health and Safety Act. This death was the only recorded construction-related fatality on the busway network to date.

In June 2008, the Queensland Government approved the project's Concept Design and Impact Management Plan. The Concept Design and Impact Management Plan projects for a long-term investment in the future of the eastern suburbs.

The Government committed $466 million for the next section of the Eastern Busway. This funding included 96 property resumptions between Buranda and Cavendish Road, Coorparoo and construction of the 1.05 kilometres (0.65 mi) section between the South East Busway and Main Avenue, Coorparoo with stations at Stones Corner and Langlands Park.

In December 2008, the Queensland Government announced the Eastern Busway Alliance of Leighton Contractors, Sinclair Knight Merz, Maunsell and AECOM to build this section.

The Buranda to Main Avenue section connects the existing South East Busway at Buranda with Coorparoo via Stones Corner. Busway stations have been built at Stones Corner and Langlands Park.

Department of Transport and Main Roads compulsorily resumed the Myer building for Eastern Busway project on 31 July 2009. Construction work on the section commenced in August 2009. The Coorparoo bus station and busway proposed at the Myer building are not built. The section opened on 29 August 2011.

=== Extension to Capalaba ===
Further extensions of the Eastern Busway are ready for immediate delivery, should funding become available under the Australian Government's Infrastructure Australia program. The Queensland Government's Transport and Main Roads Department has stated that "planning for the ultimate Eastern Busway between Main Avenue, Coorparoo and Capalaba is currently being revised, with further stages subject to funding and government priorities".

The department is developing cost-effective short and medium term options for the Old Cleveland Road corridor, including intersection upgrades to allow for bus priority. It is proposed to extend the Eastern Busway along the Old Cleveland Road corridor via the suburbs of Coorparoo, Camp Hill, Carina, Carindale and Chandler to Capalaba. Historically, the Old Cleveland Road corridor was a major tram route until closure of Brisbane's tram network in 1969.

== Stations ==
Legend: Adjacent to a train station, Adjacent to a ferry wharf

List of Eastern busway, Brisbane stations
Station	Image	Suburb	Opened	Grade
UQ Lakes	busway station	St Lucia	17 December 2006	Ground
Boggo Road	Busway station	Dutton Park	3 August 2009	Ground
PA Hospital	Busway station	Buranda	3 August 2009	Elevated
Buranda	Busway station	Buranda	30 April 2001	Below ground
Stones Corner	Busway station	Stones Corner	29 August 2011	Elevated
Langlands Park	Busway station	Stones Corner	29 August 2011	Ground

== Services ==
All services on the busway are operated by Transport for Brisbane.

== Facilities ==
Real time passenger information is displayed at each station, with fixed LED signs suspended above each platform. These signs present four lines of real-time estimated bus departure times, with data provided by Brisbane City Council's RAPID system.

== See also ==
- Transport in Brisbane
