= UQ Lakes busway station =

Bus station in Brisbane, Australia

UQ Lakes
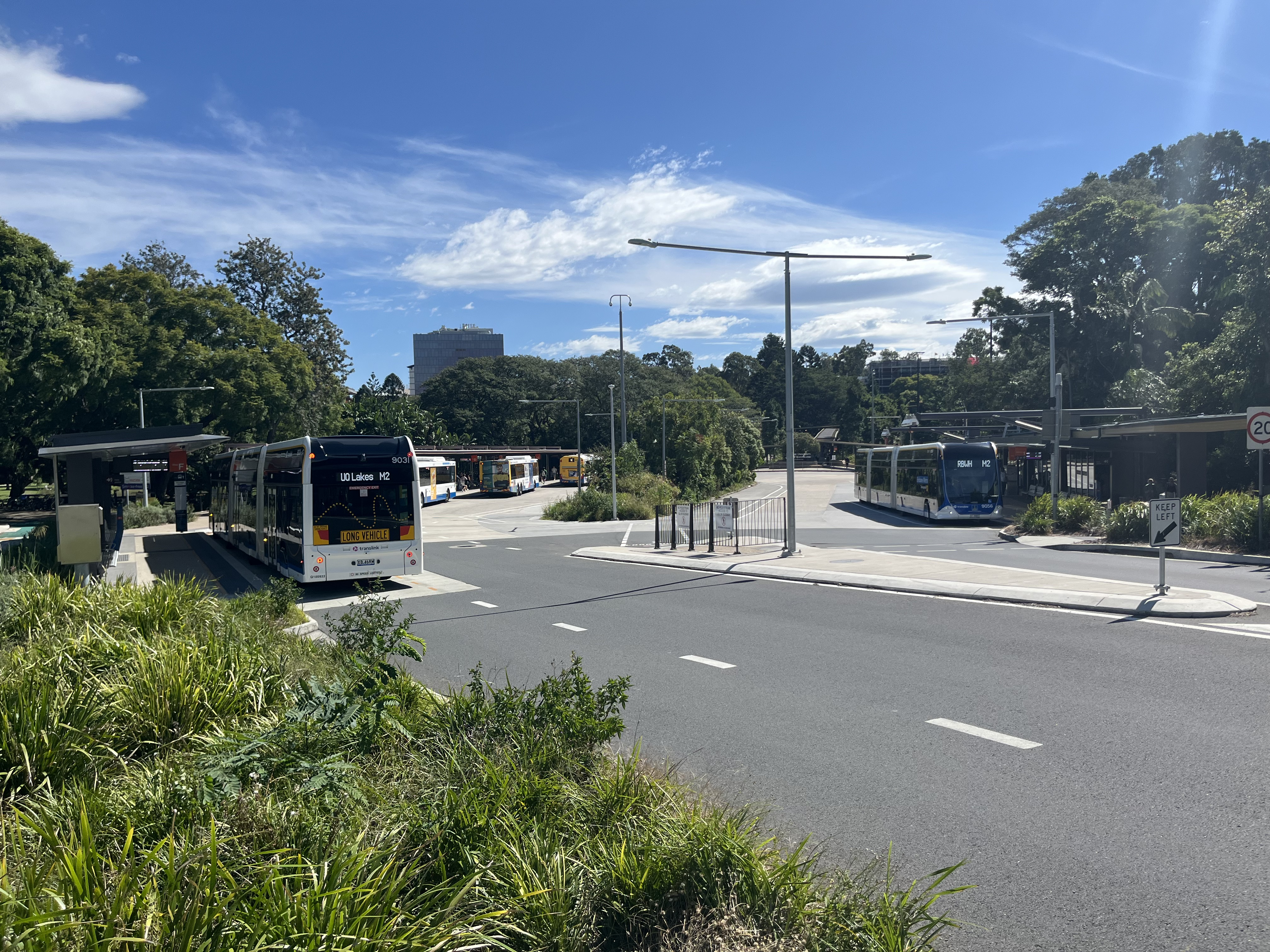
- Brisbane Metro and regular bus services at UQ Lakes

General information
- Location: College Road, St Lucia
- Coordinates: 27.4979°S 153.018°E
- Owner: Department of Transport & Main Roads
- Operator: Transport for Brisbane
- Line: Eastern
- Platforms: 2
- Bus routes: 7
- Bus stands: 6 (stop B is drop off only)
- Connections: UQ St Lucia ferry wharf

Construction
- Accessible: Yes

Other information
- Station code: 011501 (stop A); 011503 (stop C); 011504 (stop D); 011505 (stop E); 001947 (stop F)
- Fare zone: Zone 1
- Website: Translink

History
- Opened: 17 December 2006; 19 years ago

Services
Preceding station	Translink	Following station
Terminus	Eastern Busway	Boggo Road towards Langlands Park
Location

UQ Lakes is a busway station operated by Translink on the Eastern Busway. It opened in 2006 and serves as the western terminus of the busway, located at the University of Queensland (UQ) in the Brisbane suburb of St Lucia. It is a ground level station, featuring two side platforms.

By 2012, about 1.5 million passengers were using the bus stop each year, making it one of the top-5 busiest stops in Brisbane.

In May 2015, the UQ St Lucia ferry wharf was relocated to a location near the UQ Lakes busway station.

It is served by seven routes all operated by Transport for Brisbane.

== History ==
Originally opening with one platform, a second platform using the existing pathway was added 2008 in order to serve a route extension from West End.

A further expansion costing $3 million began construction in 2011 to cope with increased bus services. Opening in June 2012, the upgrade involved a turning lane upgrade, an increase from four to six stops, larger waiting areas, additional shelters and improved lighting.

The station received another upgrade from 2022 to 2025, to cope with the introduction of the Brisbane Metro. Apart from renovating the original shelters, a new stop F is added on platform 1, and three 600kW pantograph quick chargers are installed on stop A, B and bus refuge area for metro vehicles to be fully charged in 6 minutes.

=== Through-service between UQ Lakes and UQ Chancellors Place ===
Back in 2003, the council proposed to build an underground tunnel to connect the bus stops at both ends of the campus, so direct services from Dutton Park to Indooroopilly via Eleanor Schonell Bridge can be provided. UQ Senate later refused this twice due to potential disturbance to the St Lucia community.

== Routes ==
UQ Lakes busway station routes
Bus Route	Stop	Destination	Frequency
M2	A (Pick up)	RBWH	Daily
M2	B/F (Drop off)		Daily
29	C	Woolloongabba	Weekdays
139	D	Sunnybank Hills via Mains Road	Weekdays
169	C	Eight Mile Plains	Daily
179	D	Garden City via Logan Road	Daily
192	E (Inbound)	Brisbane City via West End	Weekdays
192	F (outbound)	Yeronga	Weekdays
209	E	Carindale	Daily
