= Langlands Park busway station =

Bus station in Brisbane, Australia

Langlands Park
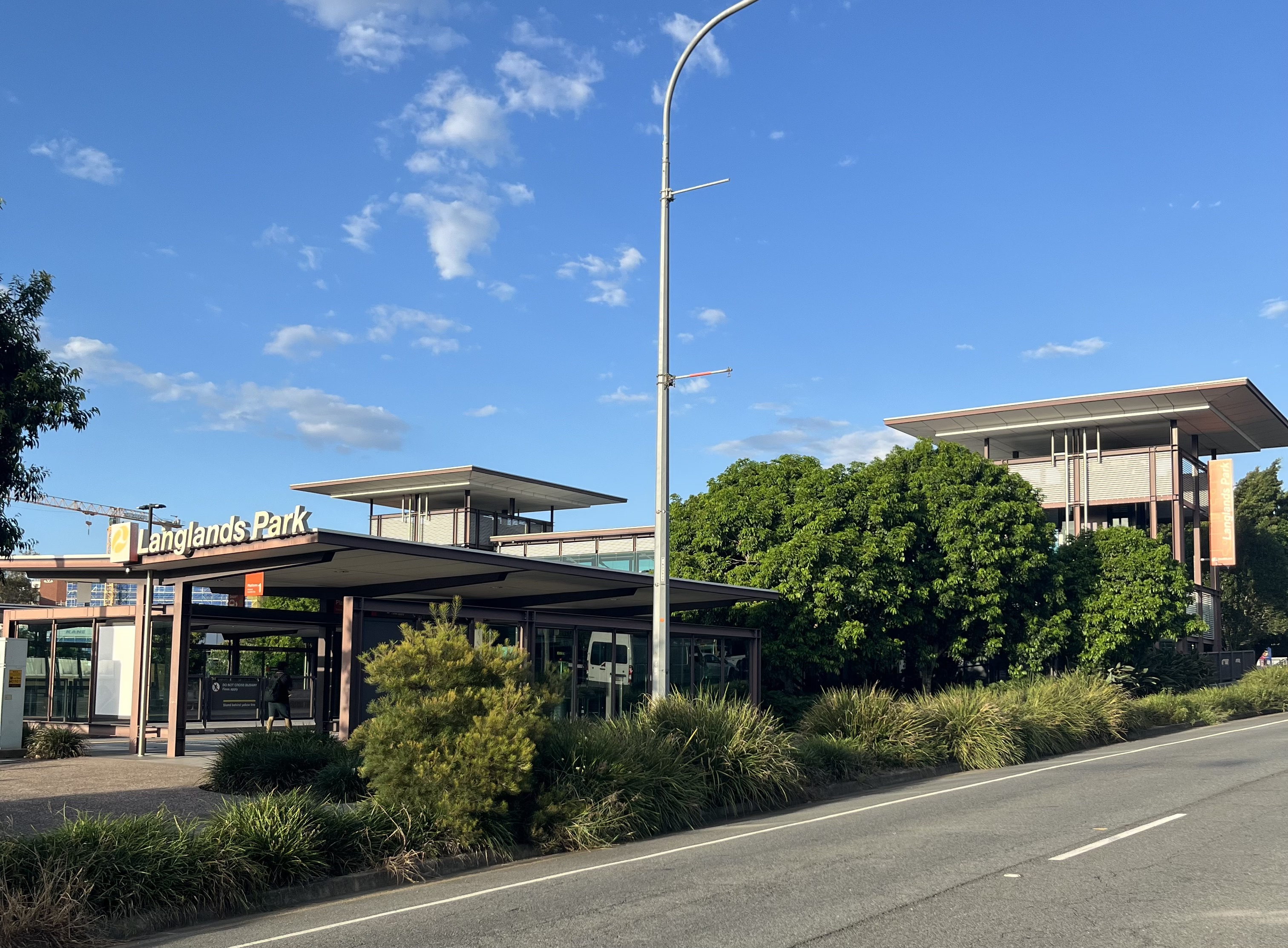
- Langlands Park busway station in March 2026

General information
- Location: Old Cleveland Road, Stones Corner
- Coordinates: 27°29′55.6″S 153°03′02.55″E
- Owner: Department of Transport & Main Roads
- Line: Eastern
- Platforms: 2 side
- Bus routes: 7
- Bus operators: Transport for Brisbane

Construction
- Structure type: Ground Level
- Accessible: Yes

Other information
- Station code: 003071 (platform 1); 003001 (platform 2)
- Fare zone: Zone 1
- Website: Translink

History
- Opened: 29 August 2011; 15 years ago

Services
Preceding station	Translink	Following station
Stones Corner towards UQ Lakes	Eastern Busway	Terminus
Location

Langlands Park is a busway station operated by Translink on the Eastern Busway. It opened in 2011 and serves the Brisbane suburbs of Stones Corner and Coorparoo. It is a ground level station, featuring two side platforms.

The station is currently the easternmost station on the Eastern Busway. It is proposed to extend the busway along Old Cleveland Road to Capalaba.

== Platforms and services ==
Langlands Park platform arrangement
Platform	Line	Direction	Routes	Notes
1	Eastern Busway	Inbound	61, 201, 203, 206, 209, 217, 222	
2	Eastern Busway	Outbound	61, 201, 203, 206, 209, 217, 222	

The station also features a bike rack and car parking facilities.
