= Greenslopes busway station =

Bus station in Brisbane, Australia

Greenslopes
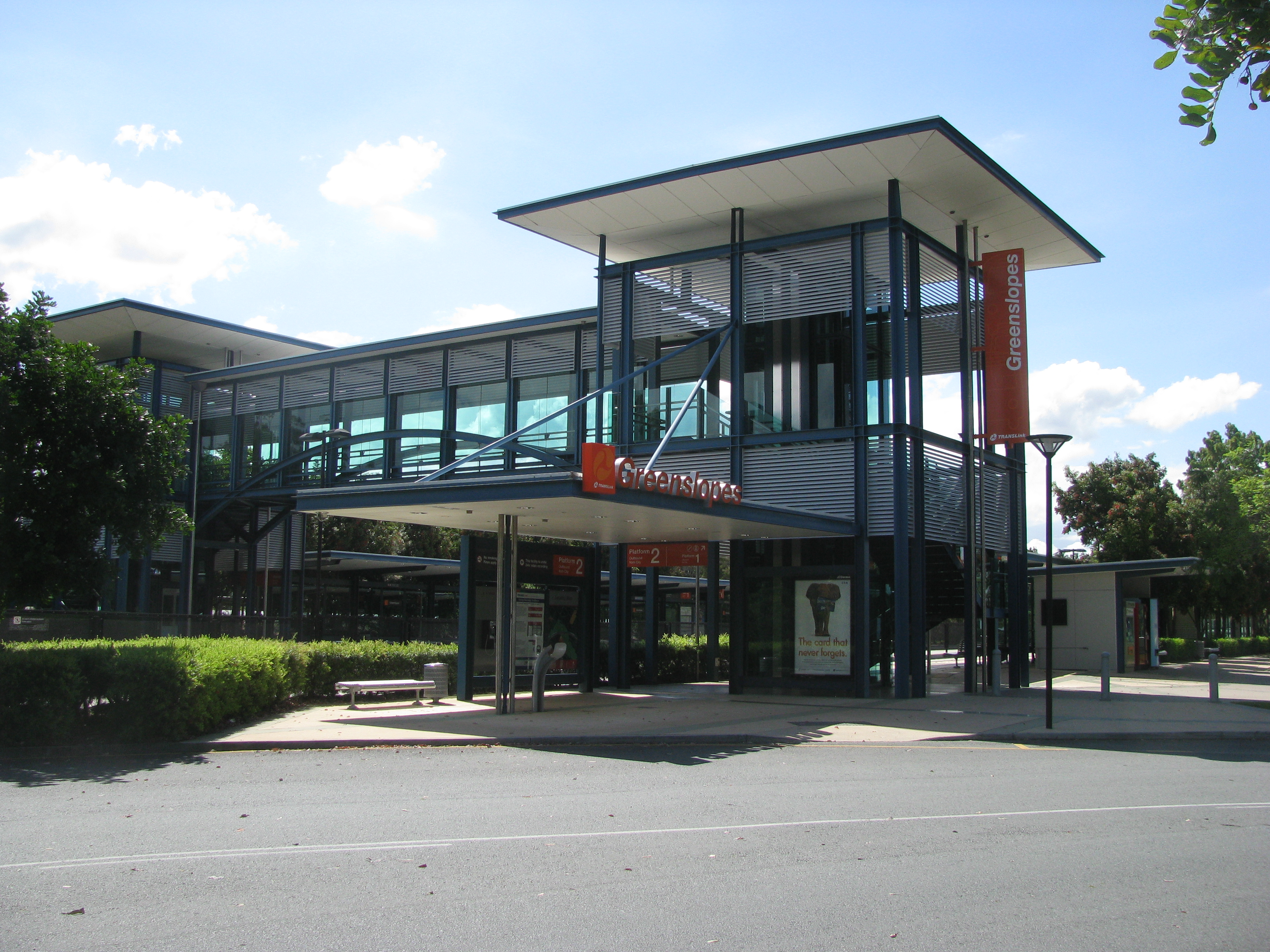
- Greenslopes busway station in November 2010

General information
- Location: Barnsdale Place, Greenslopes
- Coordinates: 27°30′40″S 153°02′25″E
- Owner: Department of Transport & Main Roads
- Line: South East
- Platforms: 2 side
- Bus routes: 8
- Bus operators: Transport for Brisbane; Clarks Logan City Bus Service; Mt Gravatt Bus Service

Construction
- Structure type: Ground level
- Cycle facilities: Yes
- Accessible: Yes

Other information
- Station code: 010816 (platform 1); 010815 (platform 2)
- Fare zone: Zone 1
- Website: Translink

History
- Opened: 30 April 2001

Services
Preceding station	Translink	Following station
Buranda towards King George Square	South East Busway	Holland Park West towards Springwood
Location

Greenslopes is a busway station operated by Translink on the South East Busway. It opened in 2001 and serves the Brisbane suburb of Greenslopes. It is a ground level station, featuring two side platforms.

== History ==
The station opened on 30 April 2001 when the South East Busway was extended from Woolloongabba to Eight Mile Plains.

== Platforms and services ==
Greenslopes platform arrangement
Platform	Line	Direction	Routes	Notes
1	South East Busway	Inbound	M1, 26, 77, 137, 139, 169, 171, 172, 176, 179, 183, 261, 299, 555	
2	South East Busway	Outbound	M1, 26, 77, 137, 139, 169, 171, 172, 176, 179, 183, 261, 299, 555	

The station also features a bike rack and drop off facilities.
