= Holland Park West busway station =

Bus station in Brisbane, Australia

Holland Park West
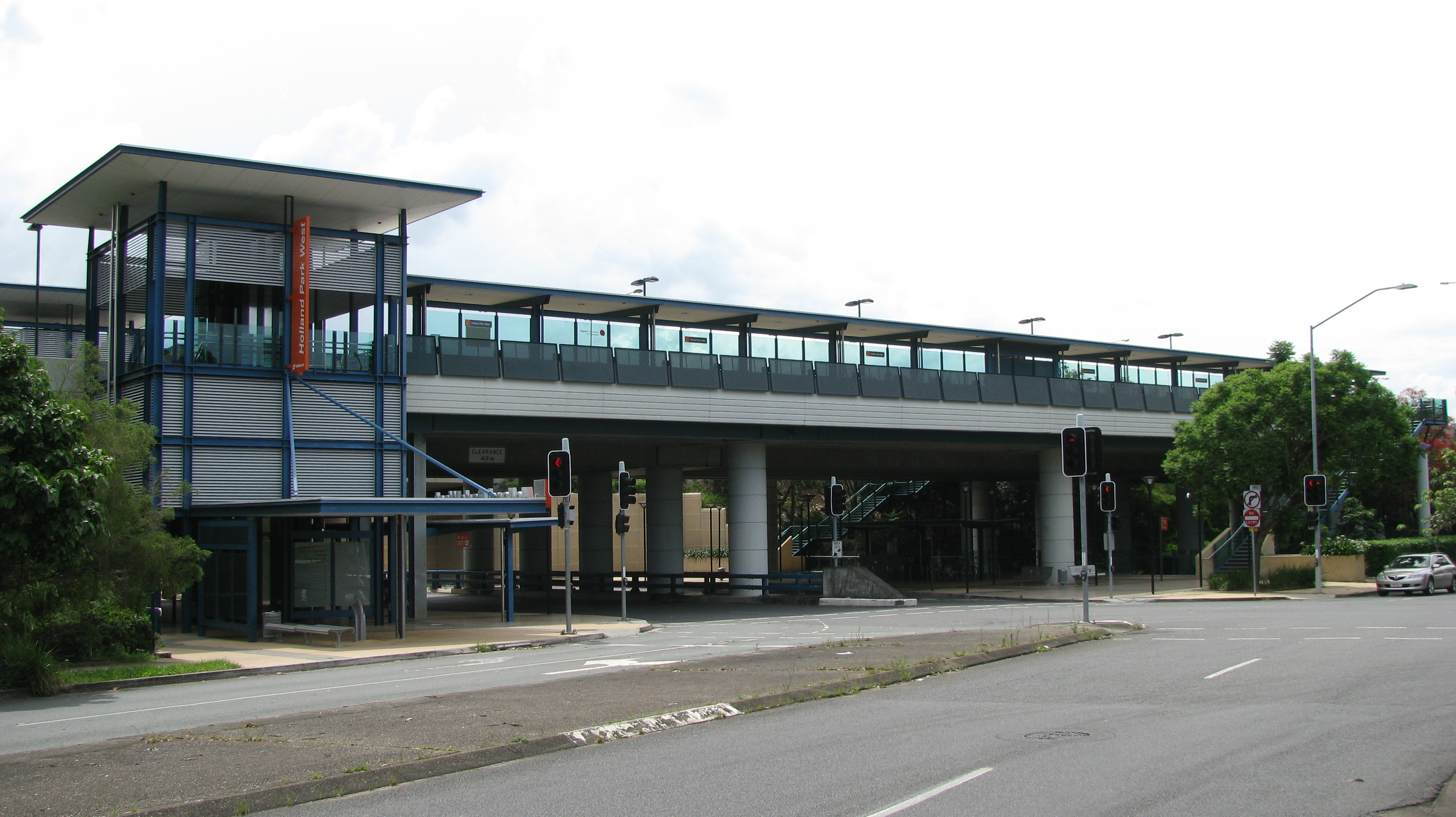
- Holland Park West busway station in December 2010

General information
- Location: Sterculia Avenue, Holland Park West
- Coordinates: 27°31′43″S 153°03′27″E
- Owner: Department of Transport & Main Roads
- Line: South East
- Platforms: 2 side
- Bus routes: 9
- Bus operators: Transport for Brisbane; Clarks Logan City Bus Service; Mt Gravatt Bus Service
- Connections: Transport for Brisbane local bus stop

Construction
- Structure type: Elevated
- Cycle facilities: Yes
- Accessible: Yes

Other information
- Station code: 010818 (platform 1); 010817 (platform 2)
- Fare zone: Zone 2
- Website: Translink

History
- Opened: 30 April 2001

Services
Preceding station	Translink	Following station
Greenslopes towards King George Square	South East Busway	Griffith University towards Springwood
Location

Holland Park West is a busway station operated by Translink on the South East Busway. It opened in 2001 and serves the Brisbane suburb of Holland Park West. It is an elevated station, featuring two side platforms.

== History ==
The station opened on 30 April 2001 when the South East Busway was extended from Woolloongabba to Eight Mile Plains.

== Platforms and services ==
Holland Park West platform arrangement
Platform	Line	Direction	Routes	Notes
1	South East Busway	Inbound	M1, 26, 77, 137, 139, 169, 261, 555	
2	South East Busway	Outbound	M1, 26, 77, 137, 139, 169, 261, 555	

Below the station there is a local bus stop operated by Transport for Brisbane. The station also features a bike rack and drop off facilities.
