= Griffith University busway station =

Bus station in Brisbane, Australia

Griffith University
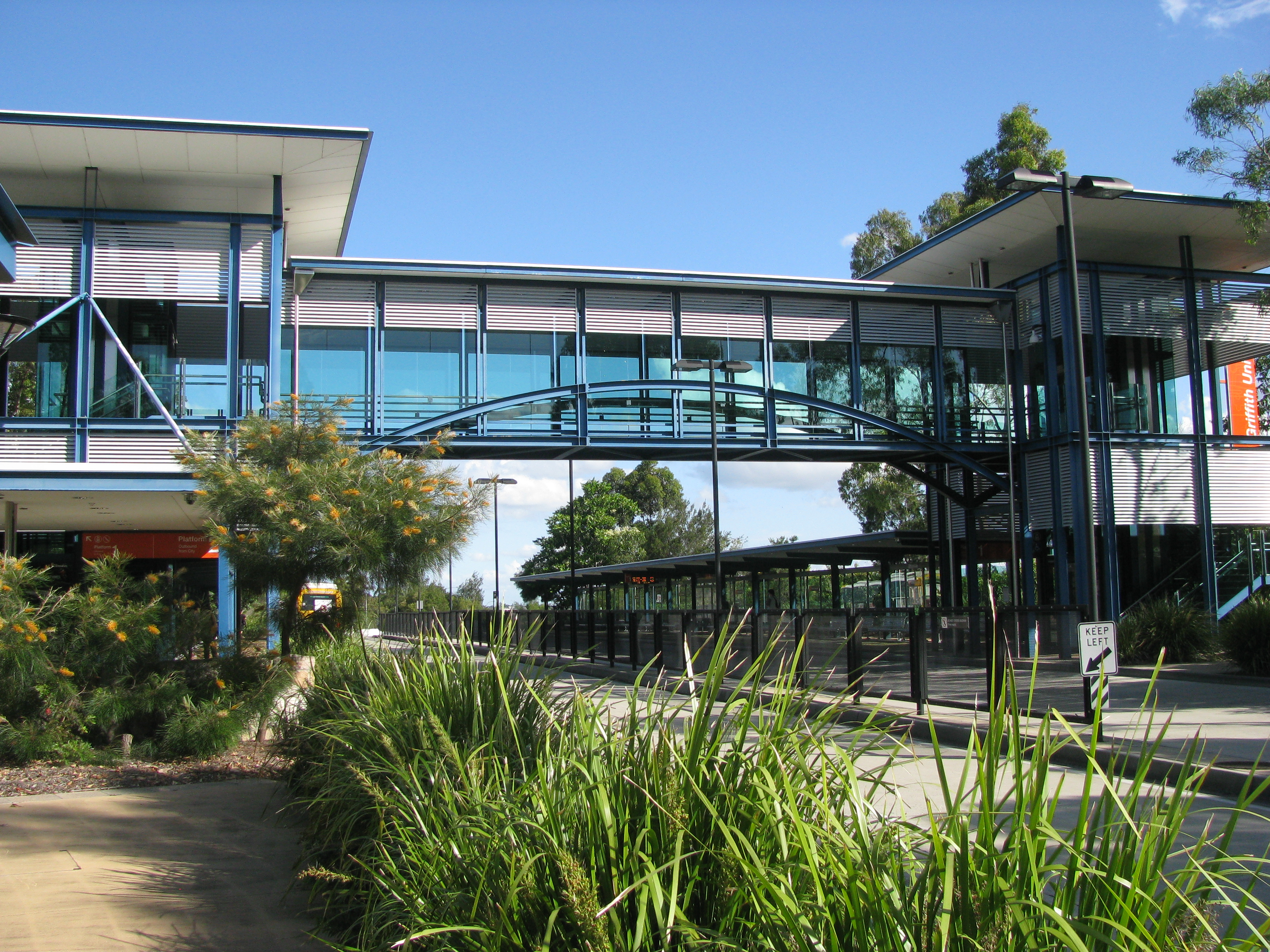
- Griffith University busway station in November 2010

General information
- Location: Griffith University, Mount Gravatt
- Coordinates: 27°32′47″S 153°03′51″E
- Owner: Department of Transport & Main Roads
- Line: South East
- Platforms: 2 side
- Bus routes: 41
- Bus operators: Transport for Brisbane; Clarks Logan City Bus Service; Mt Gravatt Bus Service; Transdev Queensland

Construction
- Structure type: Ground level
- Accessible: Yes

Other information
- Station code: 010820 (platform 1); 010819 (platform 2)
- Fare zone: Zone 2
- Website: Translink

History
- Opened: 30 April 2001

Services
Preceding station	Translink	Following station
Holland Park West towards King George Square	South East Busway	Upper Mount Gravatt towards Springwood
Location

Griffith University is a busway station operated by Translink on the South East Busway. It opened in 2001 and serves the Brisbane suburb of Mount Gravatt, and the former Griffith University Mount Gravatt campus. It is a ground station, featuring two side platforms.

== Platforms and services ==
Griffith University platform arrangement
Platform	Line	Direction	Routes	Notes
1	South East Busway	Inbound	M1, 26, 77, 115, 123, 125, 130, 131, 134, 135, 137, 139, 140, 141, 150, 155, 161, 169, 186, 261, 262, 276, 279, 280, 281, 299, 545, 546, 551, 554, 555, 561, 569, 573, 575, 576, 577, 578, 579, 581, 821	
2	South East Busway	Outbound	M1, 26, 77, 115, 123, 125, 130, 131, 134, 135, 137, 139, 140, 141, 150, 155, 161, 169, 186, 261, 262, 276, 279, 280, 281, 299, 545, 546, 551, 554, 555, 561, 569, 573, 575, 576, 577, 578, 579, 581, 821	

Bike racks and drop off facilities are also available.
