= Upper Mount Gravatt busway station =

Busway station in Brisbane, Australia

Upper Mount Gravatt
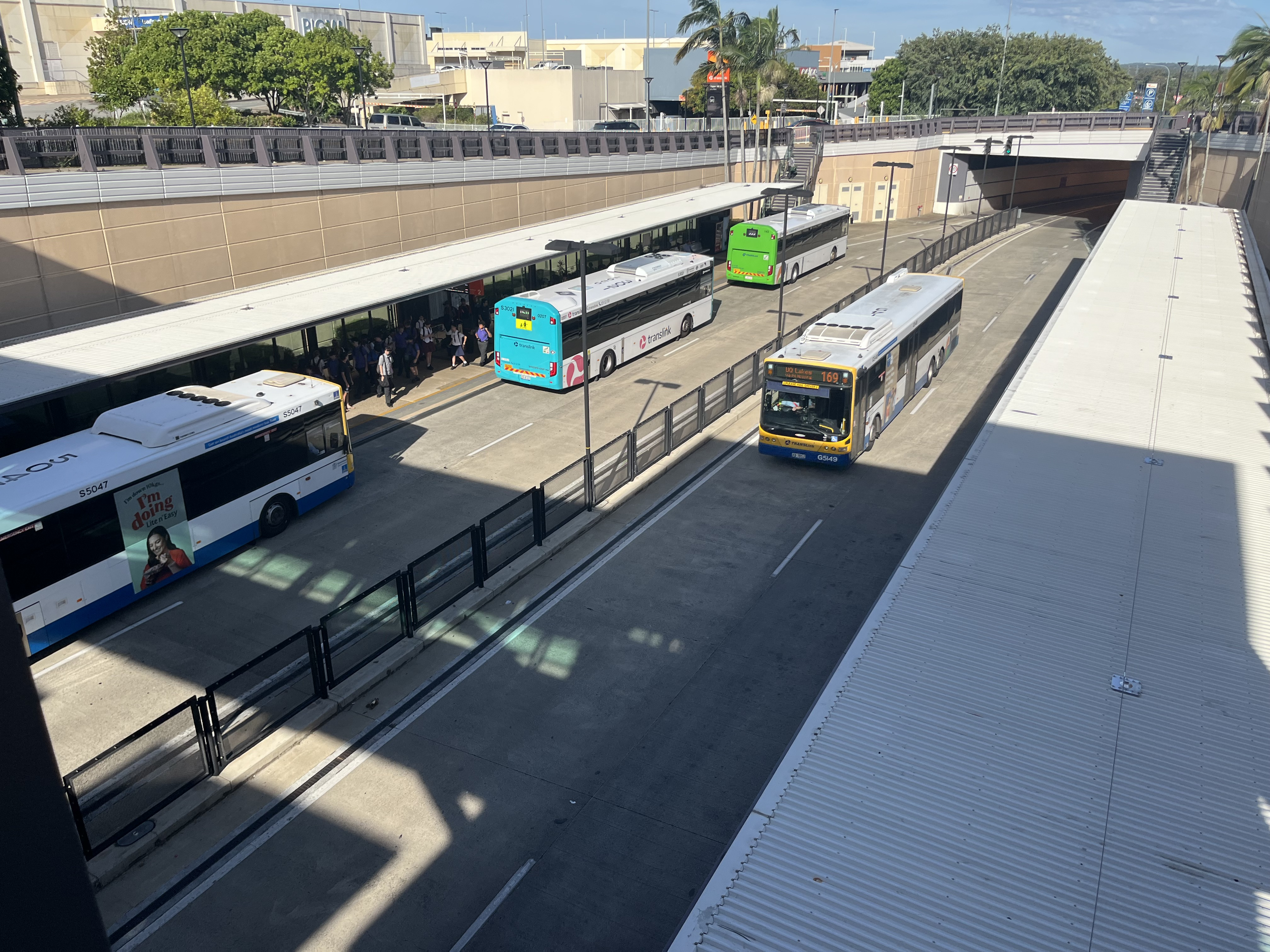
- Upper Mount Gravatt station in March 2026

General information
- Location: Macgregor Street, Upper Mount Gravatt
- Coordinates: 27°33′51″S 153°04′54″E
- Owner: Department of Transport & Main Roads
- Line: South East
- Platforms: 2 side
- Bus routes: 32
- Bus operators: Transport for Brisbane; Clarks Logan City Bus Service; Mt Gravatt Bus Service; Transdev Queensland
- Connections: Garden City bus station

Construction
- Structure type: Below ground
- Accessible: Yes

Other information
- Station code: 010822 (platform 1); 010821 (platform 2)
- Fare zone: Zone 2
- Website: Translink

History
- Opened: 30 April 2001

Services
Preceding station	Translink	Following station
Griffith University towards King George Square	South East Busway	Eight Mile Plains towards Springwood
Location

Upper Mount Gravatt is a busway station operated by Translink on the South East Busway. It opened in 2001 and serves the Brisbane suburbs of Upper Mount Gravatt and Mount Gravatt. It is a below ground station, featuring two side platforms.

Located above the busway station is the Garden City bus station, which opened on 22 April 1999 and serves Westfield Mt Gravatt (formerly known as Westfield Garden City).

== Platforms and services ==
Upper Mount Gravatt platform arrangement
Platform	Line	Direction	Routes	Notes
1	South East Busway	Inbound	M1, 26, 77, 116, 118, 125, 138, 150, 153, 156, 162, 169, 261, 262, 276, 279, 280, 281, 299, 545, 551, 554, 555, 561, 569, 573, 575, 576, 577, 578, 579, 581	Not all routes depart from both platforms.
2	South East Busway	Outbound	M1, 26, 77, 116, 118, 125, 138, 150, 153, 156, 162, 169, 261, 262, 276, 279, 280, 281, 299, 545, 551, 554, 555, 561, 569, 573, 575, 576, 577, 578, 579, 581	Not all routes depart from both platforms.

Bike racks, parking lot and drop off facilities are available at the adjacent Garden City bus station.
