= South East Busway =

Bus-only road in Queensland, Australia

Coordinates: 27°30′29″S 153°02′20.4″E

Overview
- System: Translink
- Operator: Transport for Brisbane; Clarks Logan City Bus Service; Mt Gravatt Bus Service; Transdev Queensland; Park Ridge Transit
- Status: Open
- Began service: 13 September 2000

Route
- Start: King George Square
- Via: Pacific Motorway
- End: Springwood
- Stations: 14 (13 busway stations) (1 bus station)

The South East Busway is a bus-only road running south from the Brisbane central business district to Springwood in Queensland, Australia.

== History ==
Busways were considered as one of the options when the Queensland Government developed the 25 year Integrated Regional Transport Plan. Other methods such as light and heavy rail were also considered. It was recommended that a 75 km (47 mi) network of busway corridors to complement the existing Queensland Rail City network would suit best.

Busways would allow buses to serve low-density communities and bypass peak hour congestion. Busway stations could be developed at key nodes to serve major activity centres, and combining different routes would create high frequency services.

In 1995, plans for a network of five busway corridors were conceived, linking with the rail network to improve public transport connectivity across the city. The busways would improve the operation of the bus fleet, reducing maintenance and running costs and maximising the effectiveness of the region's investment in buses.

In August 1996, the Queensland Government approved the South East Transit Project to manage the construction of both the northern section of the Pacific Motorway between Mount Gravatt and Logan City and a dedicated 2-lane, 2-way road for buses between the Brisbane CBD and Eight Mile Plains.

The first section of busway between the existing Queen Street bus station and Woolloongabba was opened to services on 13 September 2000 to coincide with the start of the 2000 Olympic football tournament, for which some matches were held in Brisbane. It initially opened for outbound services only, with inbound services commencing on 23 October 2000. The second 13.2 km (8.2 mi) section of busway between Woolloongabba and Eight Mile Plains opened on 30 April 2001.

=== Extension to Springwood ===
An extension from Eight Mile Plains to Rochedale and Springwood was proposed in July 2006 as part of the Queensland Government's Pacific Motorway Transit Project. As part of the project, plans were made to extend the busway infrastructure as far as Springwood, including construction of the proposed Rochedale busway station. The preferred alignment for the busway extension corridor was determined in 2007 and a Concept Design Study was undertaken by the Queensland Government in 2009.

Construction commenced in late 2012 and was completed in March 2014. The extension had an estimated cost of $36 million. The extension was funded in full by the Queensland Government and formed part of the Federal Government's Gateway Upgrade South (GUS) project. The busway extension passed under the Gateway Motorway and terminated at School Road, Rochedale. Whilst the busway alignment plan published in 2010 anticipated a Busway Station at Rochedale, no new busway stations were added to this extension.

As part of an upgrade of the Pacific Motorway between Eight Mile Plains and Daisy Hill, the busway infrastructure was further extended to Springwood with the addition of a new busway station at Rochedale. The upgrade commenced in 2020 and was initially expected to be completed in 2024, though this was delayed to 2025. Rochedale busway station was completed in February 2025 and opened 12 May 2025.

== Stations ==
Legend: Adjacent to a train station, Park n' Ride

List of South-East Busway stations
Station	Image	Suburb	Opened	Grade
King George Square	Underground busway station	Brisbane CBD	19 May 2008	Underground
Cultural Centre	Busway station	South Brisbane	23 October 2000	Ground
South Bank	Busway station	South Brisbane	23 October 2000	Elevated
Mater Hill	Busway station	South Brisbane	23 October 2000	Ground
Wooloongabba	Busway station	Woolloongabba	13 September 2000	Ground
Buranda	Busway station	Buranda	30 April 2001	Below ground
Greenslopes	Busway station	Greenslopes	30 April 2001	Ground
Holland Park West	Busway station	Holland Park West	30 April 2001	Elevated
Griffith University	Busway station	Mount Gravatt	30 April 2001	Ground
Upper Mount Gravatt	Busway station	Upper Mount Gravatt	30 April 2001	Below ground
Eight Mile Plains	Busway station	Eight Mile Plains	30 April 2001	Below Ground
Rochedale	Busway station	Rochedale	12 May 2025	Ground
Springwood	Busway station	Springwood	1 September 2003	Ground

== Services ==
Transport for Brisbane services' southernmost station is Eight Mile Plains, whilst Clarks Logan City Bus Service operate services along the full length of the busway to Springwood. Mt Gravatt Bus Service and Transdev Queensland operate services between Griffith University and Eight Mile Plains.

== Facilities ==
Real time passenger information is displayed at each station, with fixed LED signs suspended above each platform. These signs present four lines of real-time estimated bus departure times, with data provided by Brisbane City Council's RAPID system.

== See also ==
- Transport in Brisbane
