= Rochedale busway station =

Bus station in Brisbane, Australia

Coordinates: 27°36′49.72″S 153°07′26.02″E

Rochedale
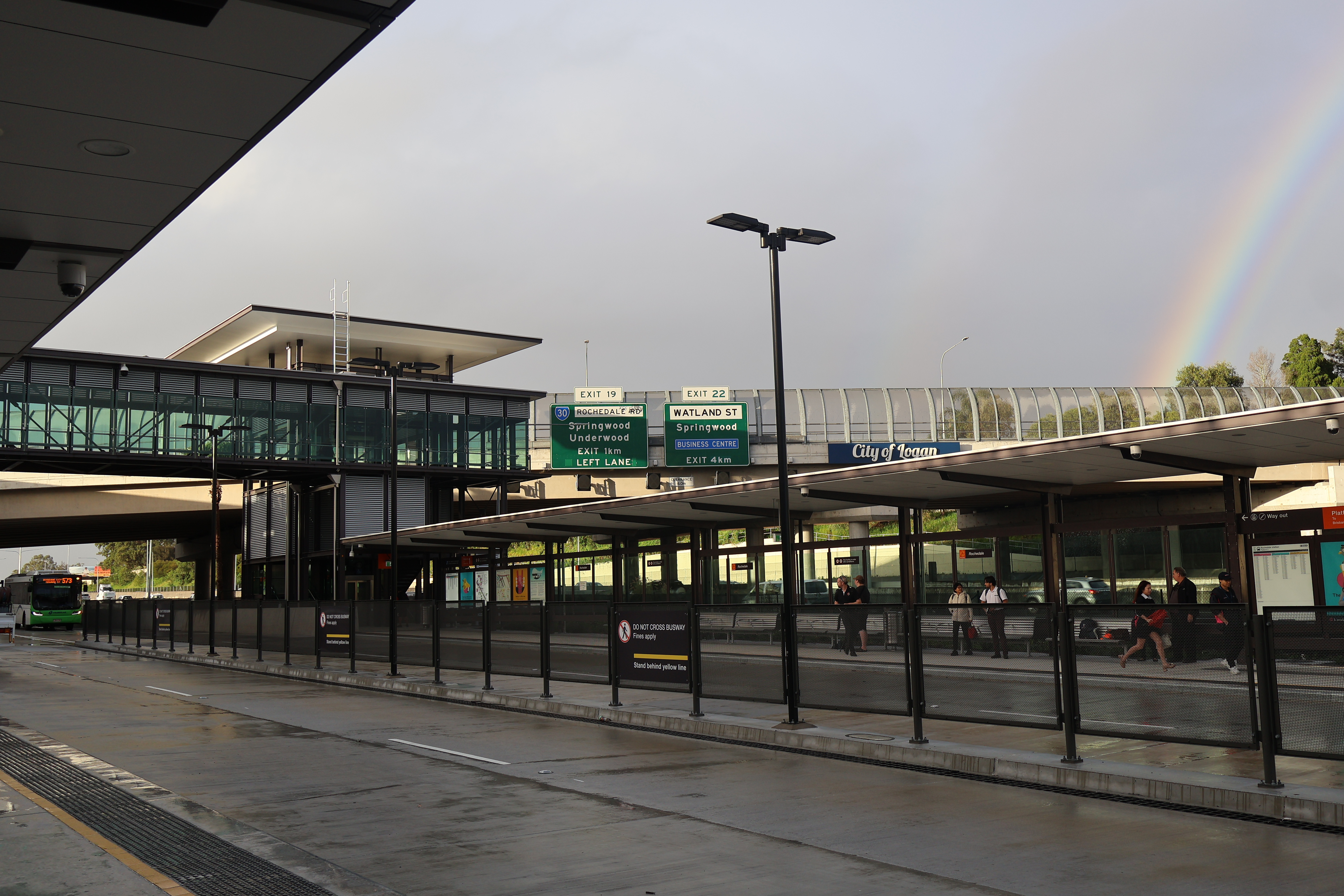
- Rochedale busway station in May 2025

General information
- Location: Underwood & School Roads, Rochedale
- Owner: Translink
- Line: South East
- Platforms: 2 side
- Bus routes: 9
- Bus operators: Clarks Logan City Bus Service; Park Ridge Transit; Transport for Brisbane (proposed)

Construction
- Structure type: Ground level
- Accessible: yes

Other information
- Station code: 321946 (platform 1); 321945 (platform 2)
- Fare zone: Zone 2

History
- Opened: 12 May 2025

Services
Preceding station	Translink	Following station
Eight Mile Plains towards King George Square	South East Busway	Springwood Terminus
Location

Rochedale is a busway station operated by Translink on the South East Busway. It opened in 2025 and serves the Brisbane suburb of Rochedale. It is a ground level station, featuring two side platforms.

== History ==
The Rochedale Busway Station was proposed in 2007 to include:

- a Park 'n' Ride facility with approximately 750 car-parking spaces;
- bus turnaround facilities and access to allow entry and exit to the busway by local bus routes;
- other mixed-use development.

As part of the Stage 2 upgrades to the Pacific Motorway between Eight Mile Plains and Daisy Hill, the South East Busway was extended to Springwood busway station, including the construction of Rochedale busway station. The Park 'n' Ride was changed to have a capacity of approximately 400 vehicles.

Construction began in August 2022. Originally scheduled for a 2024 opening. Construction was complete in February 2025.

On 19 February 2025, State MP for Springwood Mick de Brenni accused the Crisafulli state government of unnecessarily delaying the opening of the station, stating, "the signs are up, the asphalt is laid and even the service boards for the buses have been lit up for months now."

Translink announced on 24 April 2025 that the station would open 12 May 2025, with changes to timetables for both local buses and express buses to Brisbane City.

== Platforms and services ==
Rochedale platform arrangement
Platform	Line	Direction	Routes	Notes
1	South East Busway	Inbound	545, 551, 555, 561, 573, 575, 576, 557, 581	Not all routes depart from both platforms.
2	South East Busway	Outbound	545, 551, 555, 561, 573, 575, 576, 557, 581	Not all routes depart from both platforms.

The station also features a bike rack, park and ride and drop off facilities.
