= Transdev Brisbane =

Transdev Brisbane may refer to:

- Transdev Brisbane Ferries, ferry operator in Brisbane, Australia
- Transdev Queensland, bus operator in Brisbane, Australia
