= Eight Mile Plains busway station =

Bus station in Brisbane, Australia

Eight Mile Plains
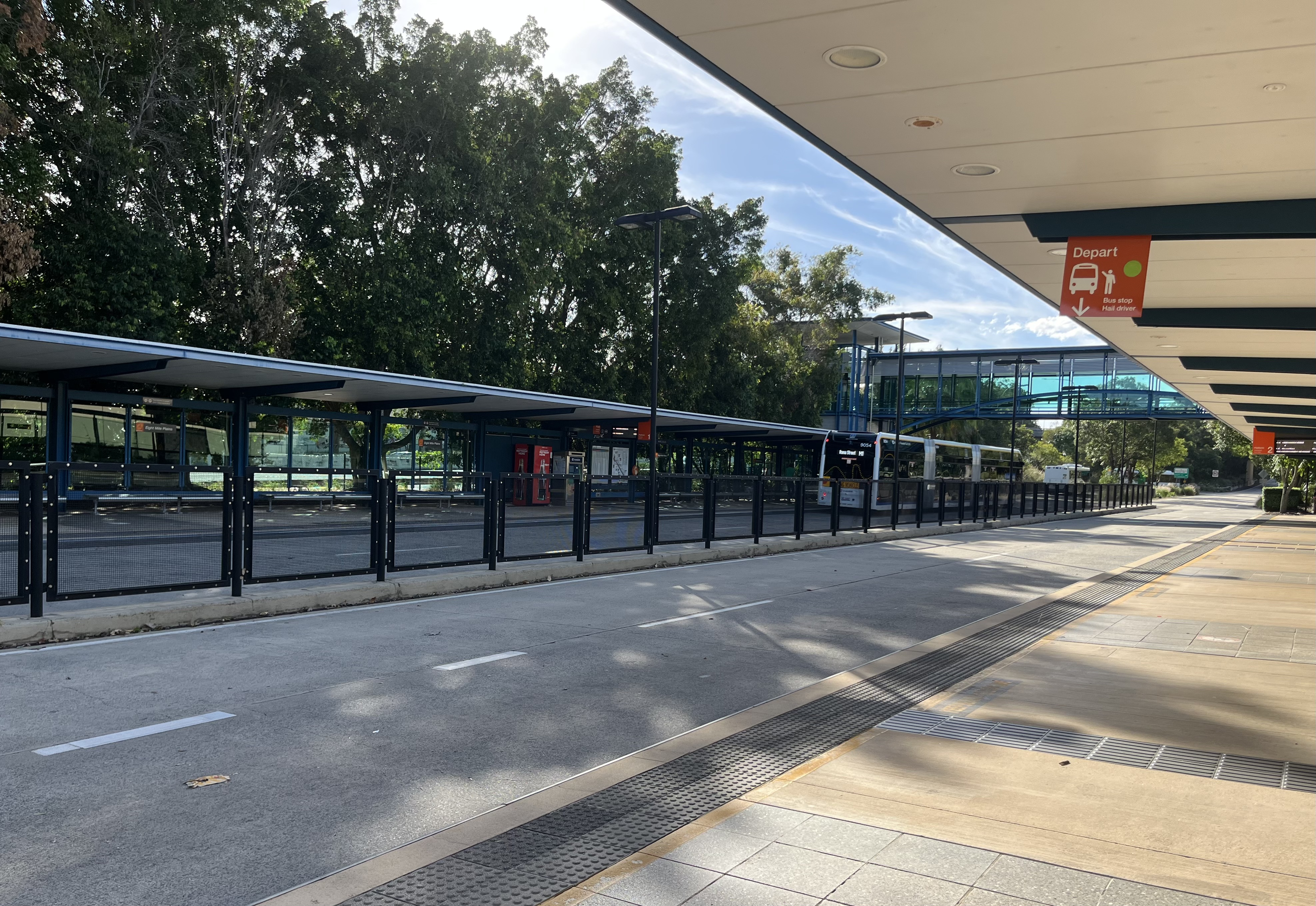
- Eight Mile Plains busway station in March 2026

General information
- Location: Miles Platting Road, Eight Mile Plains
- Coordinates: 27°34′43″S 153°06′07″E
- Owner: Department of Transport & Main Roads
- Line: South East
- Platforms: 2 side
- Bus routes: 25
- Bus operators: Transport for Brisbane; Clarks Logan City Bus Service; Mt Gravatt Bus Service; Transdev Queensland

Construction
- Structure type: Ground level
- Parking: 1190 spaces
- Accessible: Yes

Other information
- Station code: 010824 (platform 1); 010823 (platform 2)
- Fare zone: Zone 2
- Website: Translink

History
- Opened: 30 April 2001

Services
Preceding station	Translink	Following station
Upper Mount Gravatt towards King George Square	South East Busway	Rochedale towards Springwood
Location

Eight Mile Plains is a busway station operated by Translink on the South East Busway. It opened in 2001 and serves the Brisbane suburb of Eight Mile Plains. It is a ground level station, featuring two side platforms.

== Platforms and services ==
Eight Mile Plains platform arrangement
Platform	Line	Direction	Routes	Notes
1	South East Busway	Inbound	M1, 77, 155, 152, 169, 261, 262, 276, 279, 280, 281, 299, 545, 551, 554, 555, 561, 569, 573, 575, 576, 577, 578, 579, 581	Not all routes depart from both platforms.
2	South East Busway	Outbound	M1, 77, 155, 152, 169, 261, 262, 276, 279, 280, 281, 299, 545, 551, 554, 555, 561, 569, 573, 575, 576, 577, 578, 579, 581	Not all routes depart from both platforms.

The station also features a bike rack, park and ride and drop off facilities.
