= Sunliner Express =

- Parent: Lance Francis; Graham Leishman; Neil Smith
- Founded: 1986
- Ceased operation: February 1991
- Headquarters: Manly
- Service type: Coach services
- Alliance: Bayside Bus Lines; Landmark Tours; Peninsula Bus Lines
- Destinations: Brisbane; Cairns; Melbourne; Sydney
- Fleet: 41 (February 1991)

Sunliner Express was an Australian interstate coach operator.

== History ==
Sunliner Express was formed in 1986 when the Brisbane to Cairns licence of VIP Express was purchased. Sunliner was owned by current Transit Systems proprietors Lance Francis, Graham Leishman and Neil Smith who owned the Peninsula Bus Lines operation on the New South Wales Central Coast, Chalmers Coaches, Sydney and in 1985 purchased Bayside Bus Lines, Brisbane.

In 1988, Melbourne to Brisbane via Dubbo and Melbourne to Sydney services were introduced in partnership with Melbourne operator Landmark Tours. In March 1989 Sunliner took over operation of these services. In 1990 these services ceased.

Sunliner also operated day tours in Sydney and Brisbane under the Boomerang Tours name. In October 1989 a Sunliner Express Scania was involved in the Grafton bus crash with 21 people killed and 22 injured on the Pacific Highway near Grafton. At the time, this crash was the worst in Australian road transport history in terms of number of deaths. In February 1991 Sunliner Express was placed in liquidation.

== Fleet ==
Sunliner acquired eight Denning Denair and two Austral Tourmaster coaches acquired from VIP Express. These were replaced by a fleet of Austral, Custom Coaches and Pressed Metal Corporation South Australia bodied Scania K112TR and K113TRs. Sunliner's livery was a silver and two blue livery with a round sunset emblem with a silhouette of a palm tree and a white sea bird emblazoned within it.
