= Mt Gravatt Bus Service =

Bus operator in Brisbane, Australia

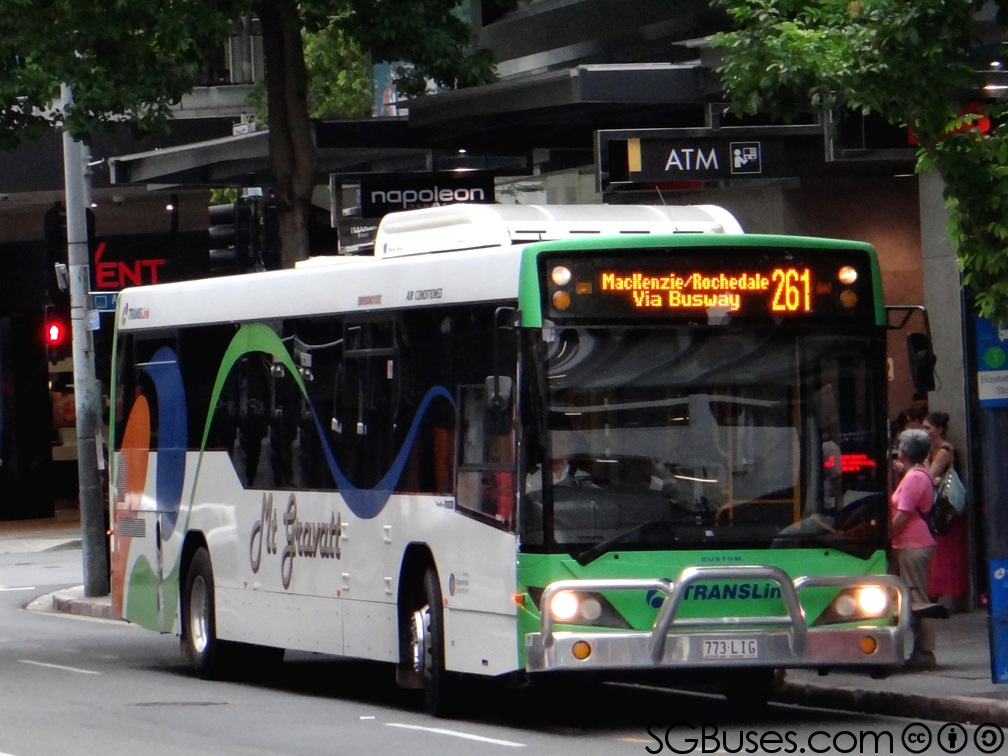
- Mt Gravatt Bus Service Custom Coaches bodied Volvo B7RLE in January 2015
- Service area: South East Brisbane
- Service type: Bus & coach operator
- Routes: 3
- Hubs: Westfield Mt Gravatt
- Depots: Burbank; Underwood
- Fleet: 48 (December 2022)
- Website: www.mtgcoach.com.au

Mt Gravatt Bus Service is an Australian operator of bus services in South East Brisbane. It operates three services under contract to the Queensland Government under the Translink banner.

== History ==
Originally named Burbank Busways the business was renamed Mt Gravatt Bus Service in 1995.

== Current Routes ==
The company currently operates 3 urban routes across Brisbane and Logan cities. They are:

| Route | From | To | Via |
|---|---|---|---|
| 261 | Mackenzie | Brisbane City | Eight Mile Plains, Griffith University, Holland Park West, Greenslopes, Buranda |
| 262 | Capalaba | Griffith University | Alexandra Hills, Burbank, Mackenzie, Upper Mount Gravatt |
| 299 | Rochedale | Brisbane City | Eight Mile Plains, Griffith University, Holland Park West, Greenslopes, Buranda |

== Fleet ==
As at December 2022, the fleet consisted of 48 buses and coaches.
