= Westfield Mt Gravatt =

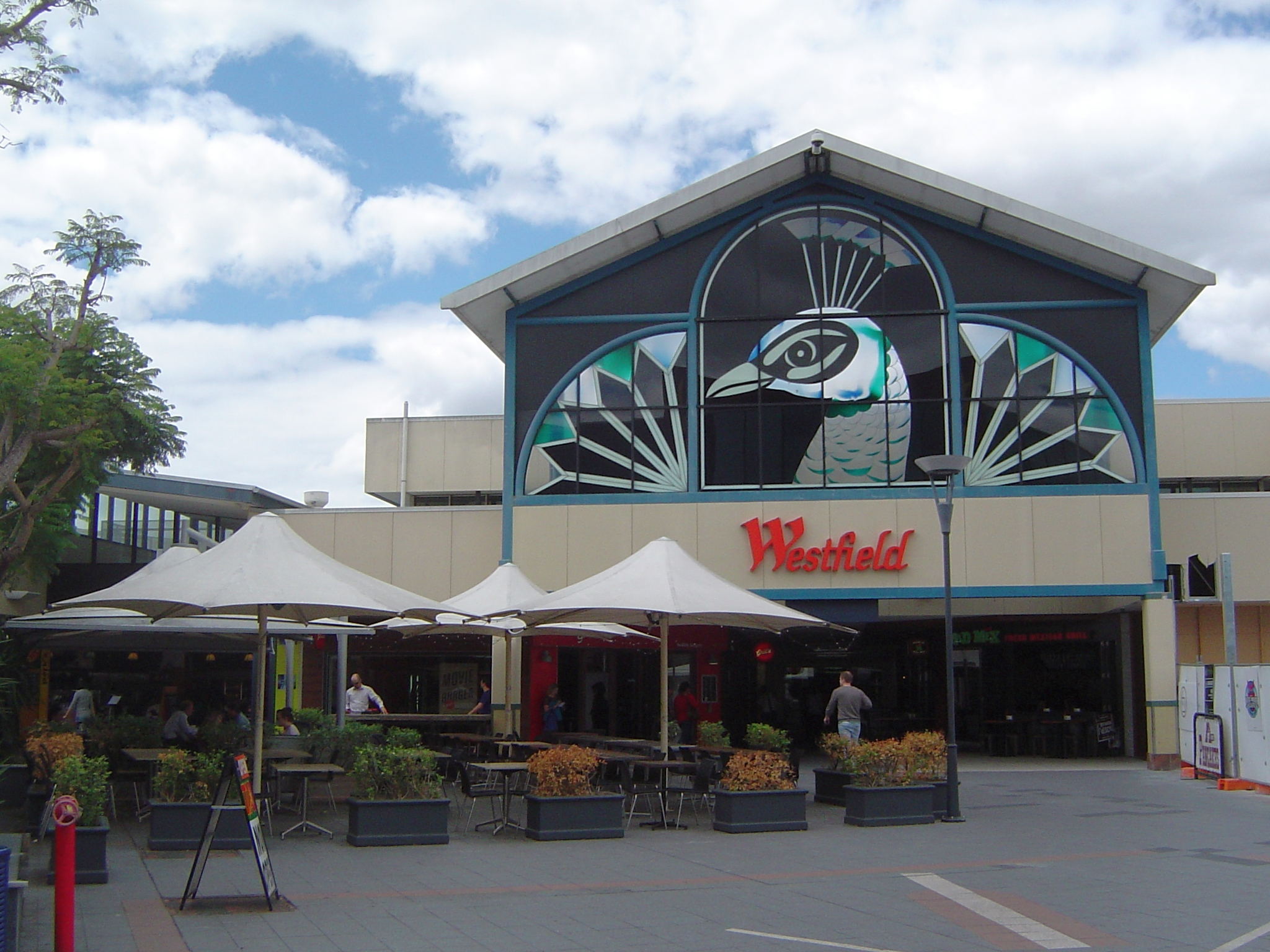
- Main entrance in September 2012
- Location: Upper Mount Gravatt, Brisbane Australia
- Coordinates: 27°33′50″S 153°05′00″E
- Developer: Hooker Projects
- Manager: Scentre Group
- Owner: Scentre Group
- Num. of stores: 470
- Num. of anchor tenants: 10
- Floor area: 142,835 m^{2} (1,537,460 sq ft)
- Floors: 2
- Parking: 6,254 spaces
- Website: www.westfield.com.au/mtgravatt

Westfield Mt Gravatt (formerly known as Westfield Garden City and colloquially known as Garden City or Garbo) is one of Brisbane's major shopping centres, located in the suburb of Upper Mount Gravatt in Queensland, Australia. It is operated by the Scentre Group.

Within the centre is Upper Mount Gravatt Post Shop and Garden City Library. Another notable feature of Garden City is the Town Square, which is an outdoor dining area featuring coffee shops, restaurants and an Event Cinemas complex.

On 8 August 2022, the centre was renamed Westfield Mt Gravatt to better reflect its location, although the centre is not in the suburb of Mount Gravatt (which is approximately 2 km to the north) but in the suburb of Upper Mount Gravatt.

== History ==
Garden City was constructed by Hooker Projects and pre-sold to the department store company David Jones in 1960. Opened on 1 October 1970, Garden City featured a three level David Jones department store, a two level McDonnell and East department store, a 1 level Woolworths family store and a Brisbane City Council library. One of the highlights of the opening day was a helicopter drop of a thousand ping pong balls some of which contained notes for prizes to be won. Thousands of shoppers ran through the car park on the northern side of the centre trying to catch a prize ball.

Over the years there have been a number of changes and expansions to Garden City. Below is a brief summary of these changes.

In 1980, an extension was added to the eastern end of the centre. This featured additional major and specialty stores. A food court was added to the centre adjacent to the main court in 1982.

In 1986, an extension was added to the southern part of the 1980 extension. This new extension added a Super Kmart Hypermarket to the centre plus additional specialty stores.

1990 brought a number of major store changes to the centre. The McDonnell and East department store closed due to the retailer going into receivership. Its space was split into two with the toy store Toys 'R' Us occupying one half and the Brisbane City Council library relocating to the other from its original space. Around this time, discount department store Venture closed due to the retailer going into receivership. Also, due to Coles-Myer retiring the Super Kmart concept, the store at Garden City was divided into a Kmart discount department store and Coles supermarket.

In 1998, David Jones relocated from its original location to a new 2 level store that was built on the site of the original Woolworths supermarket. Woolworths relocated to a new store that was built on a second level that was added to the 1980 extension. The original David Jones store was converted into a multi level car park. A Big-W discount department store opened as part of a new second level on the 1986 extension.

In 2000, the outdoor dining and entertainment precinct known as Town Square was added in what was originally a small bus station zone and car park at the main entrance to the centre. Two white painted breeze block walls at the rear of Grill’d and Mad Mex's are remnants of the original male and female public toilets that serviced the bus station. As part of this expansion, a 16 screen Birch Carroll and Coyle Megaplex (now Event Cinemas) opened on the northern end of the centre.

In 2003, an expansion was added to the west of the 1986 extension which added a new mall on the first level where the Coles supermarket was located. The Coles supermarket relocated to the end of this new mall. Harvey Norman opened a store on the second level which occupies the area above this new mall.

2014 saw the opening of another expansion in which a Myer department store, a Target discount department store (which previously traded in the Mount Gravatt Plaza shopping centre on Creek Road, Mount Gravatt), an Aldi supermarket, a market precinct and approximately 100 specialty stores were added to the centre. The centre's Kmart store closed on 2 March and later reopened in a new store with the opening of the expansion on 18 September.

On 8 August 2022, the centre was renamed Westfield Mt [sic] Gravatt to better reflect its location, although the centre is not in the suburb of Mount Gravatt but in the neighbouring suburb of Upper Mount Gravatt. Later in 2022, David Jones announced the closure of its Mt Gravatt store in January 2023 after 52 years. The store's last trading day was the 15th of January, 2023.

== Transport ==
The centre includes the Garden City bus station and the adjacent Upper Mount Gravatt busway station, which is a major hub for Transport for Brisbane buses on the southside. The centre has 4,675 spaces available for car parking.

== Major retailers ==
Majors

- Myer Department Store – 2 levels
- Big W Discount Department Store
- Kmart Discount Department Store
- Target Discount Department Store
- Aldi Supermarket
- Coles Supermarket
- Woolworths Supermarket
- EB Games Australia Consumer Electronics and Gaming Merchandise Retailer
- Event Cinemas 16 Screen Cinema Complex

Mini Majors

- Daiso
- H&M
- Zara
- Harris Scarfe
- Toymate
- Uniqlo
- Mecca Maxima
- JB HI-FI
- Kathmandu
- Officeworks
- Rebel
- The Reject Shop

== Renaming ==
Following the name change from Westfield Garden City to Westfield Mt Gravatt on 8 August 2022, the shopping centre's social media pages have garnered significant community criticism. The change sparked the creation of the petition Don’t change Westfield Garden City to Westfield Mt Gravatt, which received over 1,000 signatures by 10 August 2022. The state MP for Mansfield (the state electorate where the shopping centre resides), Ms Corrine McMillan declared on her Facebook page that she had signed the petition.

Objections to the name change include:

- That the new name is not accurate as the shopping centre resides in Upper Mount Gravatt, a neighbouring suburb to Mount Gravatt
- Will cause confusion for public transport users as the Garden City Interchange is an important public transport (bus) hub for Brisbane's Metro South region
- Local businesses use Garden City in their store name and to describe their location
- Garden City Library is located in the shopping centre
- The suburb name Mount Gravatt can not be abbreviated to Mt Gravatt, as per QLD state, Australian federal, and Australia Post naming conventions
- Customers and logistics providers will be confused
- It will create financial turbulence

== See also ==
- List of shopping centres in Australia
- Scentre Group
