= Transdev Queensland =

Bus operator in Brisbane, Queensland, Australia

Transdev Queensland Bus
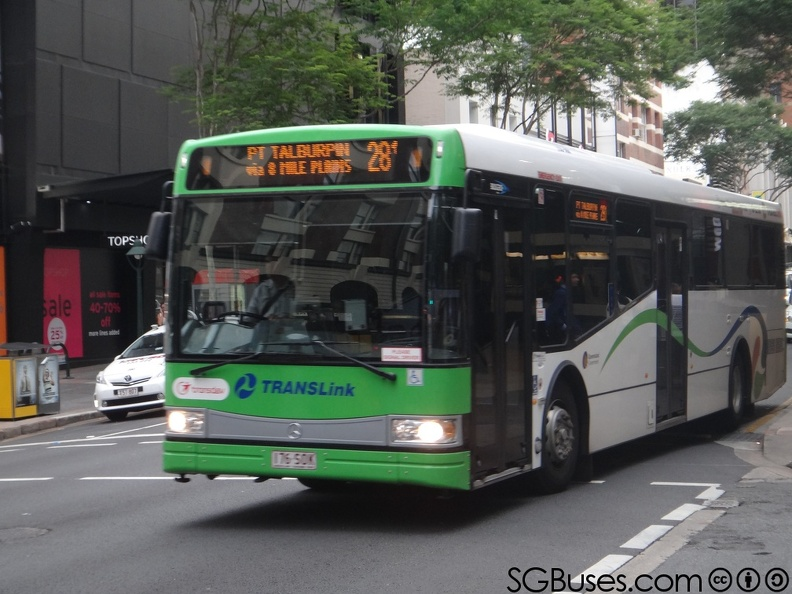
- Transdev Queensland Bustech bodied Mercedes-Benz OC500LE in January 2015
- Parent: Transdev Australasia
- Headquarters: Capalaba
- Service area: Redland City
- Service type: Bus operator
- Routes: 31
- Stations: Cleveland; Thorneside; Wellington Point; Wynnum Central
- Depots: 1
- Fleet: 109 (December 2022)
- Website: www.transdevbrisbane.com.au/bus/about/

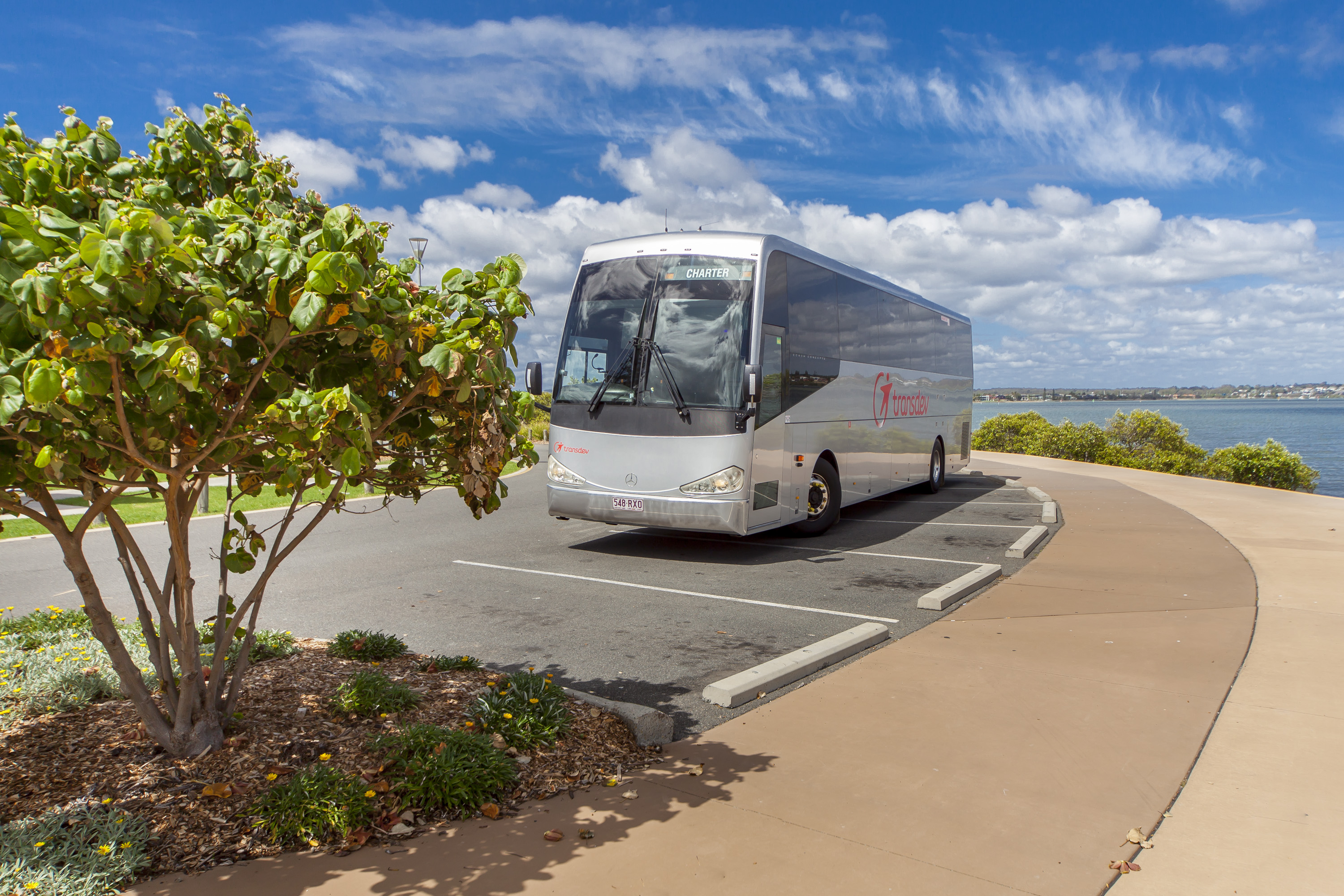
Transdev Queensland coach

Transdev Queensland Bus is an Australian operator of bus services in the Redland City region of Brisbane. It operates 31 services under contract to the Government of Queensland under the Translink banner. It is a subsidiary of Transdev Australasia.

== History ==
In the 1960s Bayside Buslines was formed when Black & White Safety Bus Line and Blue & Silver Buses merged. In 1985 Bayside Buslines was sold to current Transit Systems owners Lance Francis, Graham Leishman and Neil Smith who owned Peninsula Bus Lines on the New South Wales Central Coast. In 1989 Bayside handed in its licences to operate in Lota, Manly and Wynnum, the services having become unprofitable following the reopening of the Cleveland railway line retaining its Redland City services.

In February 1991 Bayside along with Sunliner Express was placed in administration. The business continued to be operated by its administrator until sold in July 1992 to Geoff Todd.

In August 1997 Bayside was sold to National Bus Company. It was included in the May 1999 sale of National Bus Company to National Express. In August 1999 Redlands Transport was purchased with 20 buses.

In September 2004 National Express sold the business to Connex and renamed Connex Brisbane. In January 2006 it was rebranded as Veolia Transport.

In 2007 the business of Brooker's Coaches, Beenleigh was purchased. In July 2013 Veolia Transport Queensland was rebranded as Transdev Queensland.

== Fleet ==
As at December 2022, the fleet consists of 109 buses and coaches.

In 2023, Transdev Queensland took delivery of 17 Volvo BZL battery electric buses, assembled by Volgren in Eagle Farm, Queensland.

== Ferries ==
Transdev also operated ferries in Queensland until November 2020.
