= Transport for Brisbane =

Public transport division of the Brisbane City Council

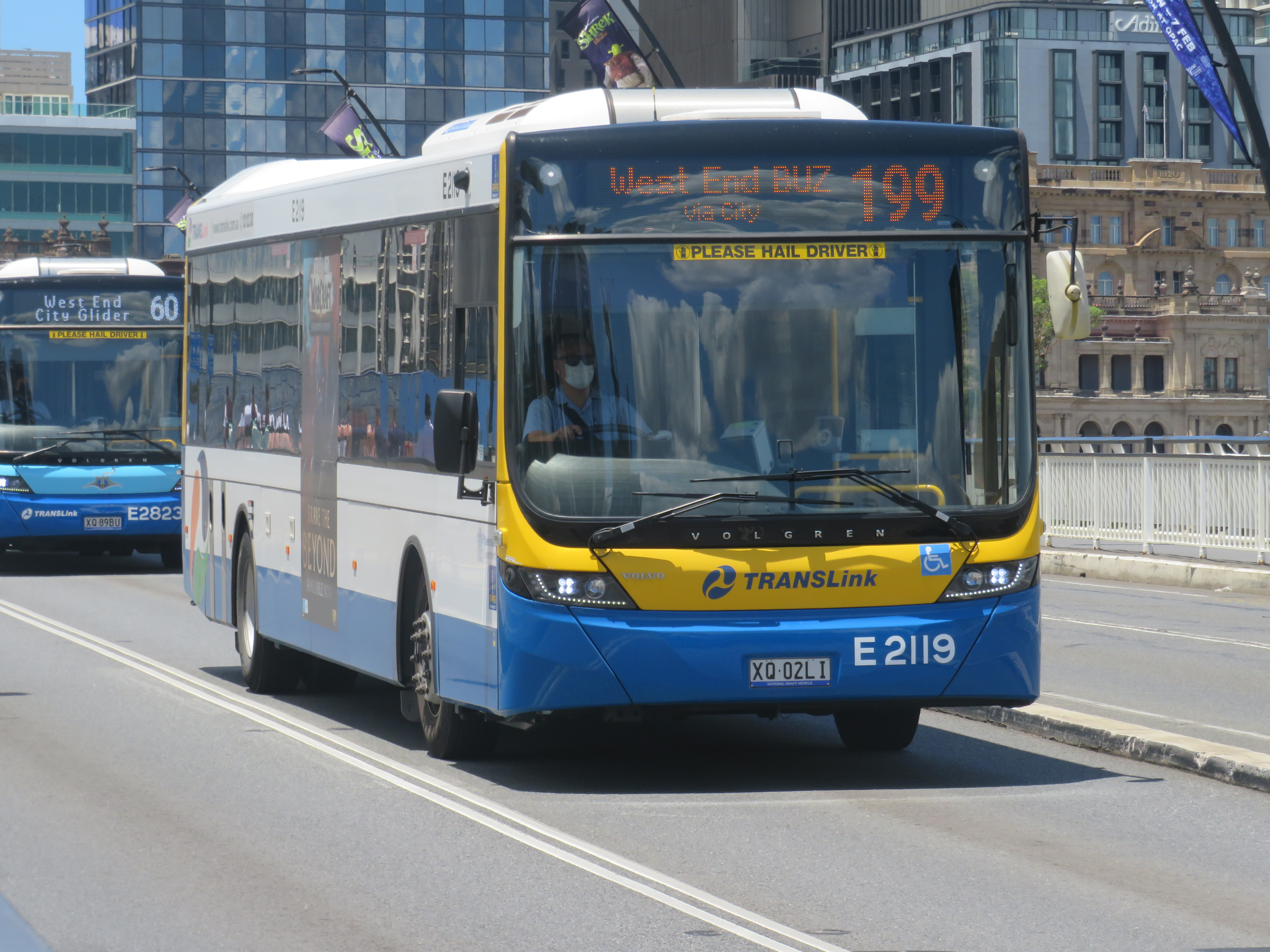
- A Transport for Brisbane bus crossing the Victoria Bridge

Division overview
- Preceding division: Brisbane Transport
- Jurisdiction: City of Brisbane, Australia
- Headquarters: 266 George Street, Brisbane
- Division executive: Samantha Abeydeera, Divisional Manager
- Parent department: Brisbane City Council
- Website: brisbane.qld.gov.au/public-transport

Transport for Brisbane, previously called Brisbane Transport, is an organisational division of the Brisbane City Council, responsible through its related Council Committee for providing policy and advice to Brisbane City Council, and for delivering various public transport services across the City of Brisbane. The division does this as part of an agreement with Translink, an agency of the Department of Transport and Main Roads that operates public transport across South East Queensland.

== History ==
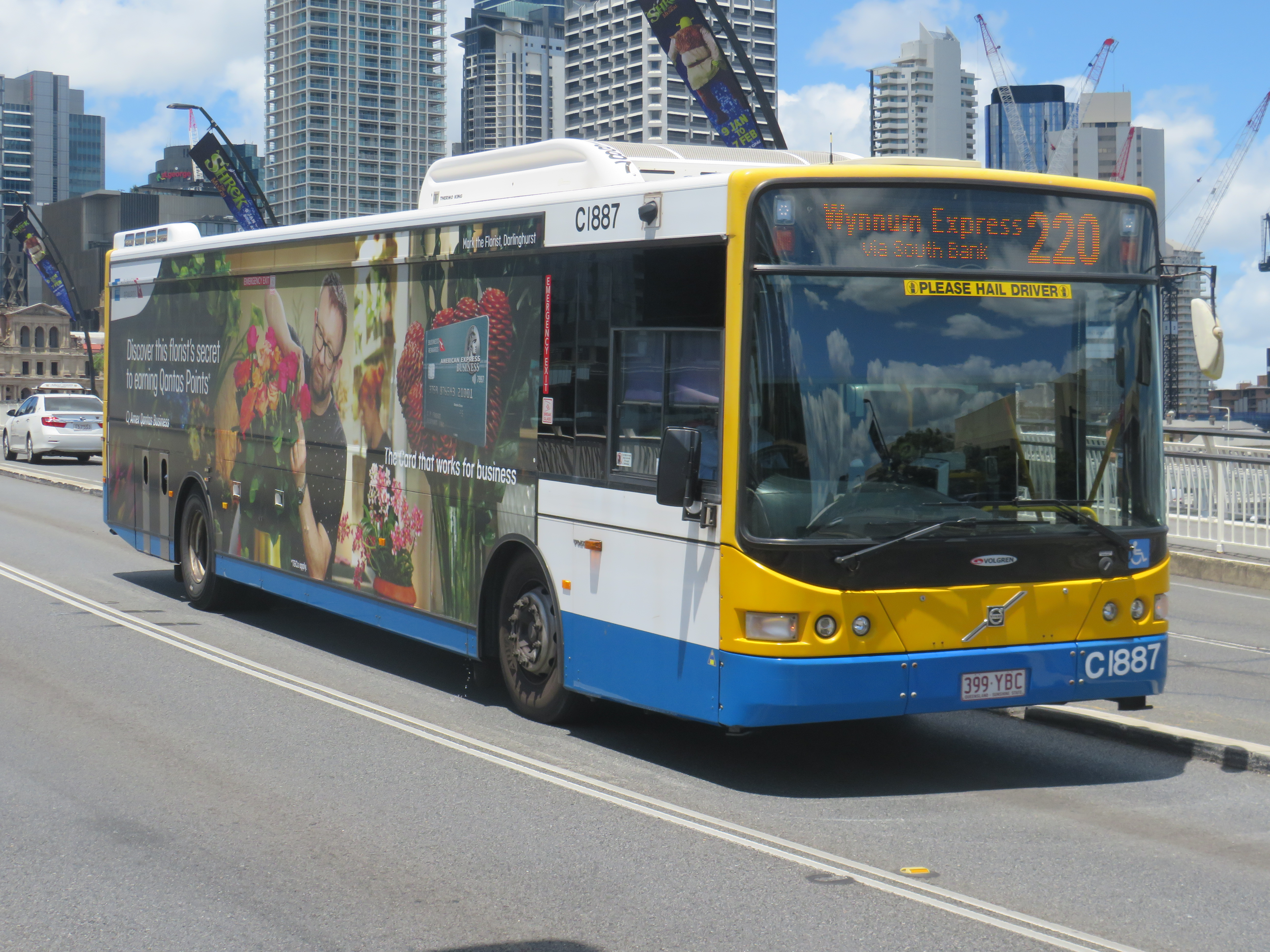

The origins of Transport for Brisbane (formerly, Brisbane Transport) can be traced to August 1885 where the Metropolitan Tramways & Investment Company established a service in Brisbane under franchise from the Queensland Government with 18 horse trams. The tram system remained in private hands until January 1923 when the Queensland government established the Brisbane Tramways Trust, compulsorily acquiring the tram network and supporting infrastructure, then in 1925 creating the Brisbane City Council and transferring responsibility for the tram network to the council. Before the council withdrew support in 1961, the council supported the tram network by expanding it to a peak of 175 kilometres (109 mi) with over 400 trams.

Bus services commenced in 1925 by the Brisbane City Council. Brisbane City Council shut down bus services due to financial loss in November 1927. Bus services recommenced 13 years later, in July 1940 with 12 Albion Valkyries. In 1948 the Brisbane City Council acquired 20 operators with 67 buses.

The first Rocket services began on the morning of 18 April 1977 between Garden City and the Brisbane CBD. These services were based on the idea that bus travel time could be reduced to less than the travel time by car by the removal of most embarkation stops.

In the 1990s, Brisbane City Council corporatised its transport services to form Brisbane Transport, a council-owned commercial businesses managed at arm's length from the council and providing consultancy services back to it.

== Infrastructure ==
The Brisbane Busway network is a bus rapid transit network in Brisbane, Australia. The network comprises grade-separated bus-only corridors, complementing the Queensland Rail Citytrain network. Management of the busway network is the responsibility of Translink as coordinator of South East Queensland's integrated public transport system.

== Services ==
=== Brisbane Metro ===
Brisbane Metro is a high-frequency bus rapid transit system that services the city. The system currently consists of two routes running through Brisbane CBD every five minutes during peak times, transporting up to 3,000 passengers per hour in each direction. Metro Route M2 commenced service on 28 January 2025, whilst Metro Route M1 commenced service on 30 June 2025.

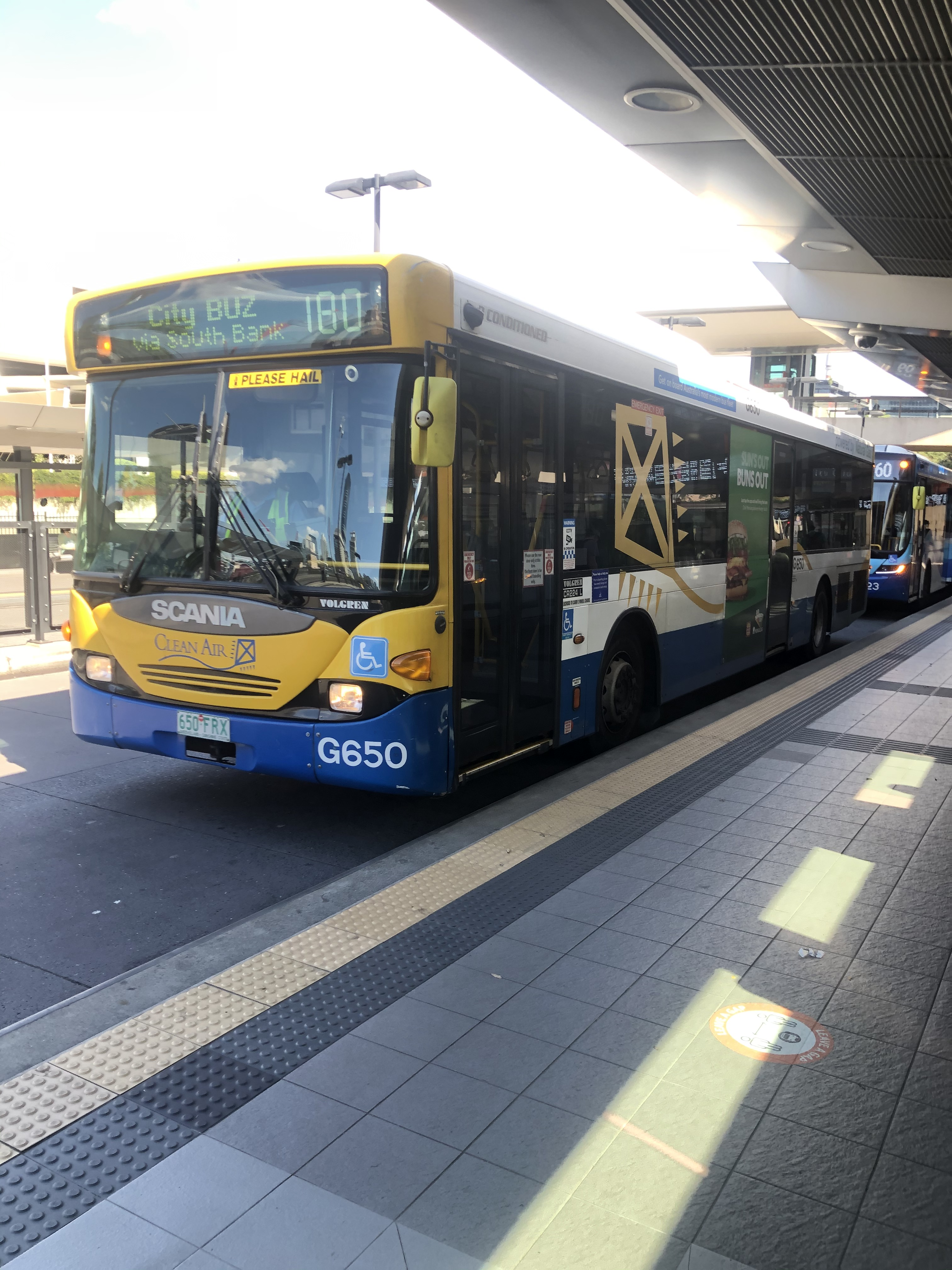
BUZ route 180 at the Culture Centre

=== BUZ ===
Bus upgrade zones, commonly abbreviated to BUZ, are a feature of Brisbane's public transport system. The name is given to high-frequency bus routes. All BUZ services run at least every fifteen minutes from around 6:00am to 11:30pm seven days a week and at least every ten minutes during peak hours from Monday to Friday.

Nearly all BUZ routes are express services which provide quick and frequent access to places along major trunk roads, with the exception of routes 196 and 199, which are the only all-stops BUZ service with bus stops within short walking distances of each other between the inner suburbs of Fairfield, West End, New Farm and Teneriffe. Most BUZ routes are radial, and commence in or near the Brisbane CBD. However, routes 196 and 199 are again an exception, in that they are cross-town routes that passes through the CBD.

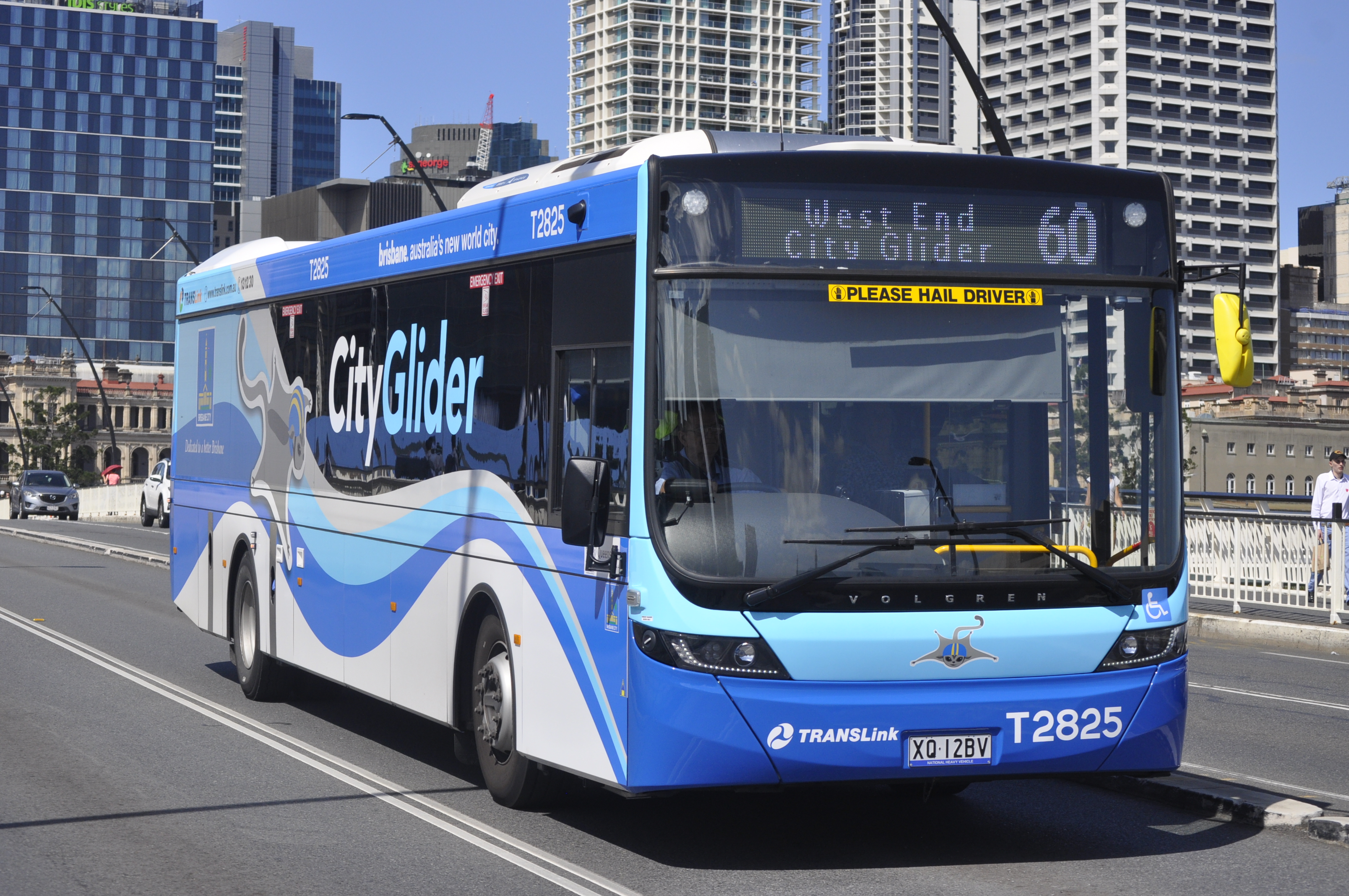
CityGlider route 60 at the Cultural Centre

=== CityGlider ===
CityGlider is a name applied to a pair of high-frequency bus routes in Brisbane, Australia. Both are operated by dedicated fleets of buses vinyled in either blue or maroon liveries with a gliding possum motif. Bus stops serviced by the CityGlider services are identified with signs and painted kerb. Both operate 24 hours a day on Fridays and Saturdays.

=== Free Loops ===
The City Loop is a free loop stopping at popular locations such as QUT, Alice Street, Botanic Gardens, Queen Street Mall, City Hall, Central Station, Riverside and Eagle Street Pier.

The Spring Hill Loop is a free loop stopping at popular locations such as Post Office Square, Old Windmill Observatory, St Andrew's War Memorial Hospital, Brisbane Private Hospital and Central Station.

These Buses run through the City and Spring Hill

=== NightLink ===
NightLink is the name given to the all-night services that leave Fortitude Valley and Brisbane City late Friday and Saturday nights.

=== Rockets ===
Rockets are peak hour services operating in the direction of peak (to the city in the mornings, from the city in the evenings) with limited stops.

== Fleet ==
=== Rigid buses ===
MAN 18.310s, Volvo B7RLEs and later Volvo B8RLEs make up the majority part of the rigid bus fleet of Brisbane Transport.

A total of 390 18.310s joined the Brisbane Transport fleet from 2005 to 2010, with 324 fitted with CNG (Compressed Natural Gas) engines (Fleet numbers 1200 to 1523) and 66 powered by diesel (Fleet numbers 1001 to 1066). Buses 1001 to 1015 were on loan to South West Transit, 1019 to 1029 were on loan to Hornibrook Bus Lines services since 2012, and returned to Brisbane Transport in July 2021. CNG powered buses are starting to pull off from service starting from 2019.

The rest of the regular rigid fleet are all Volvos, including 553 diesel-powered B7RLEs (delivered from 2009 to 2018, fleet numbers 1801 to 2353, two withdrawn from service due to accidents in 2017 and 2020). 139 Volvo B8RLEs (delivered from 2017 to 2021, numbers 2801 to 2939) and one Volvo B5RLEH Hybrid demonstrator bus (introduced in 2015, fleet number 1595), all low-floor, accessible and air-conditioned.

In October 2020, the last Scania L94UB, the first CNG and low floor bus was retired after 20 years of service. In total 217 were made with two lost due to accidents in 2003 and in 2009 when the buses exploded due to problems with the CNG engines. In November 2020, one third of buses were powered by natural gas. It is expected that by 2027, all gas powered buses will be phased out.

Four Yutong E12 battery electric buses will operate on trial with Brisbane Transport, starting from June 2021 on the City Loop free services.

The supply of Volvo buses from Volgren came to an end in June 2021, where this contract started in 2009 across a 12-year period, with the first delivery of a Volvo B7RLE (fleet number 1801); while the final bus in the contract is a Volvo B8RLE (fleet number 2939) which is the 882nd bus built.

Starting from 22 May 2023, two new battery powered Volvo BZLs have been introduced to The Spring Hill Loop Route 30.

=== Tag axle buses ===
BT operates two models of tag axle buses, 8 Scania K310UB (delivered in early 2009, fleet numbers 1701 to 1708 and later renumbered as 5001 to 5008) and 149 Volvo B12BLE (delivered from 2010 to 2013, fleet numbers 5009 to 5157), both diesel-powered and delivered from 2009 on. These larger buses are used on high-demand trunk routes, mostly on the South East Busway.

=== Articulated buses ===
Articulated buses currently used by Transport for Brisbane are 30 CNG-powered MAN NG313s (Fleet numbers 1601 to 1630), delivered from 2007 to 2008, 20 diesel-powered Volvo B8RLEAs (Fleet numbers 1631 to 1650), delivered in 2018, and 60 electric bi-articulated HESS lighTram 25s for Brisbane Metro were ordered in 2022 with the first one already operating in 2024.

A further batch of 20 B8RLEAs (Fleet numbers 1651 to 1670) has started to deliver in early 2020, 1651 and 1652 entered service in April 2020; while 1653, 1662 to 1670 entered service in March 2021. Since 12 July 2021, 1653 and the remaining 8 new artics (Fleet numbers 1654 to 1661) joined the Blue CityGlider Route 60 fleet to replace the rigid B8RLEs (Fleet numbers 2820 to 2838), while 1662 to 1670 joined the CityGlider fleet progressively to replace all the rigid B8RLEs in late 2021.

In 2024, the Brisbane Metro, using Hess Lightram 25 bi-articulated buses, started trial services on bus service 169 from Eight Mile Plains to UQ Lakes. In Q4 2024, these buses started service on the M2 from UQ Lakes to RBWH. At that time, Brisbane Metro buses were withdrawn from bus service 169. On 30 June 2025, the bi-articulated buses began services on the M1 route between Eight Mile Plains and Roma Street busway station.

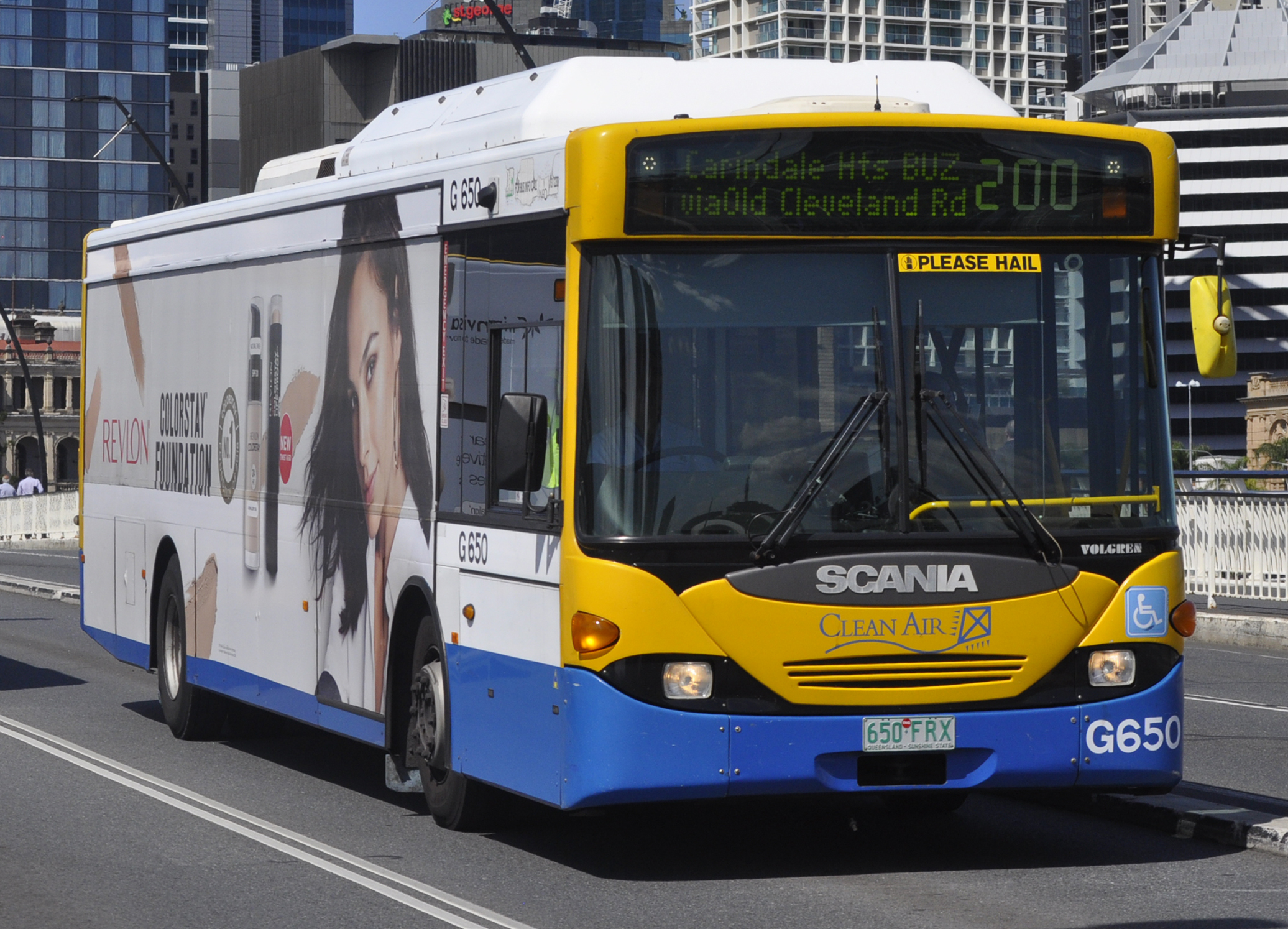
Scania L94UB (G650) is seen crossing Victoria Bridge heading towards Cultural Centre. The last bus of this type was retired in October 2020.

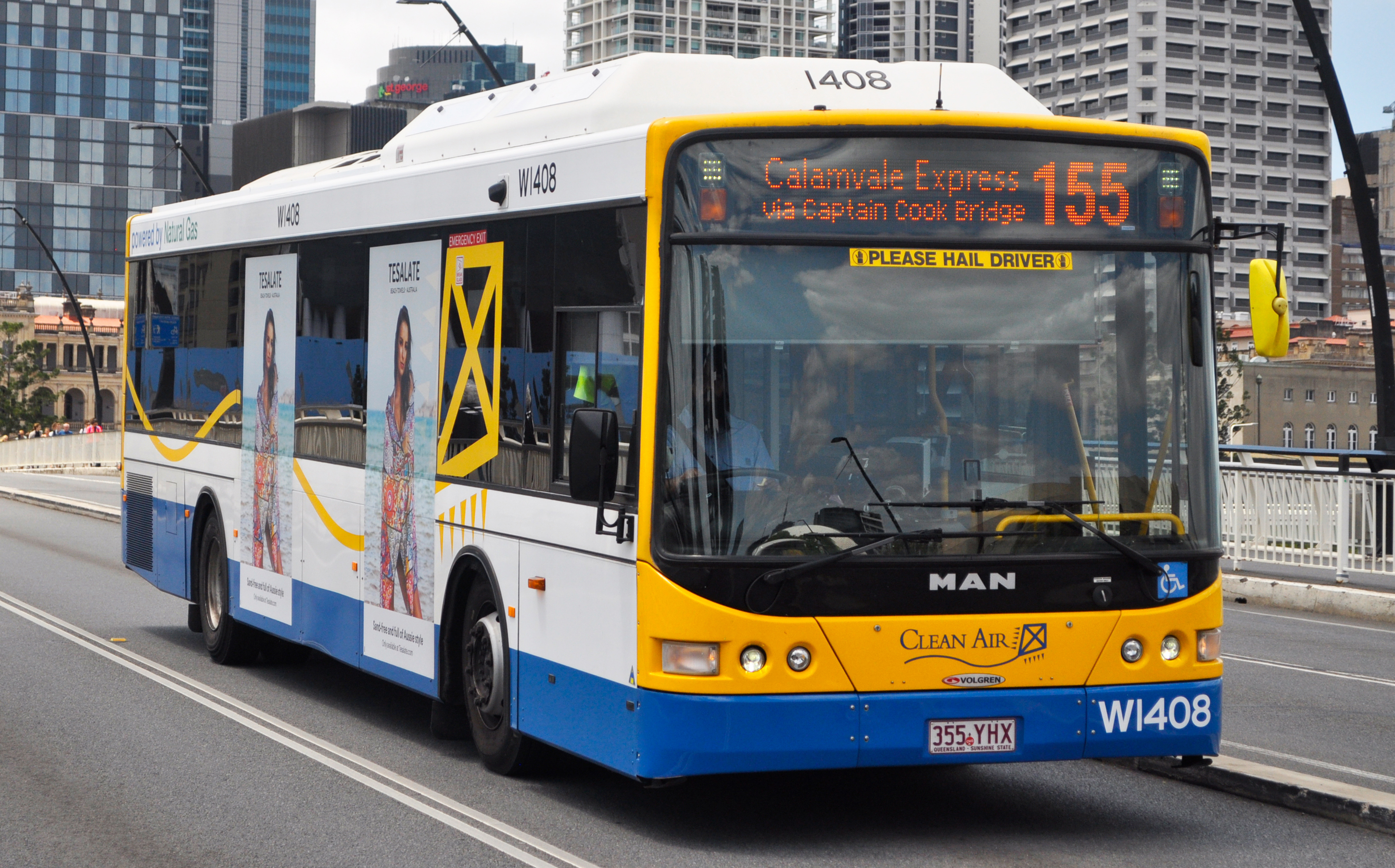
MAN 18.310 (W1408), powered by CNG, heading towards the Cultural centre doing the 155 Calamvale Express. The yellow kite on the side represents that the bus is powered by Compressed Natural Gas.

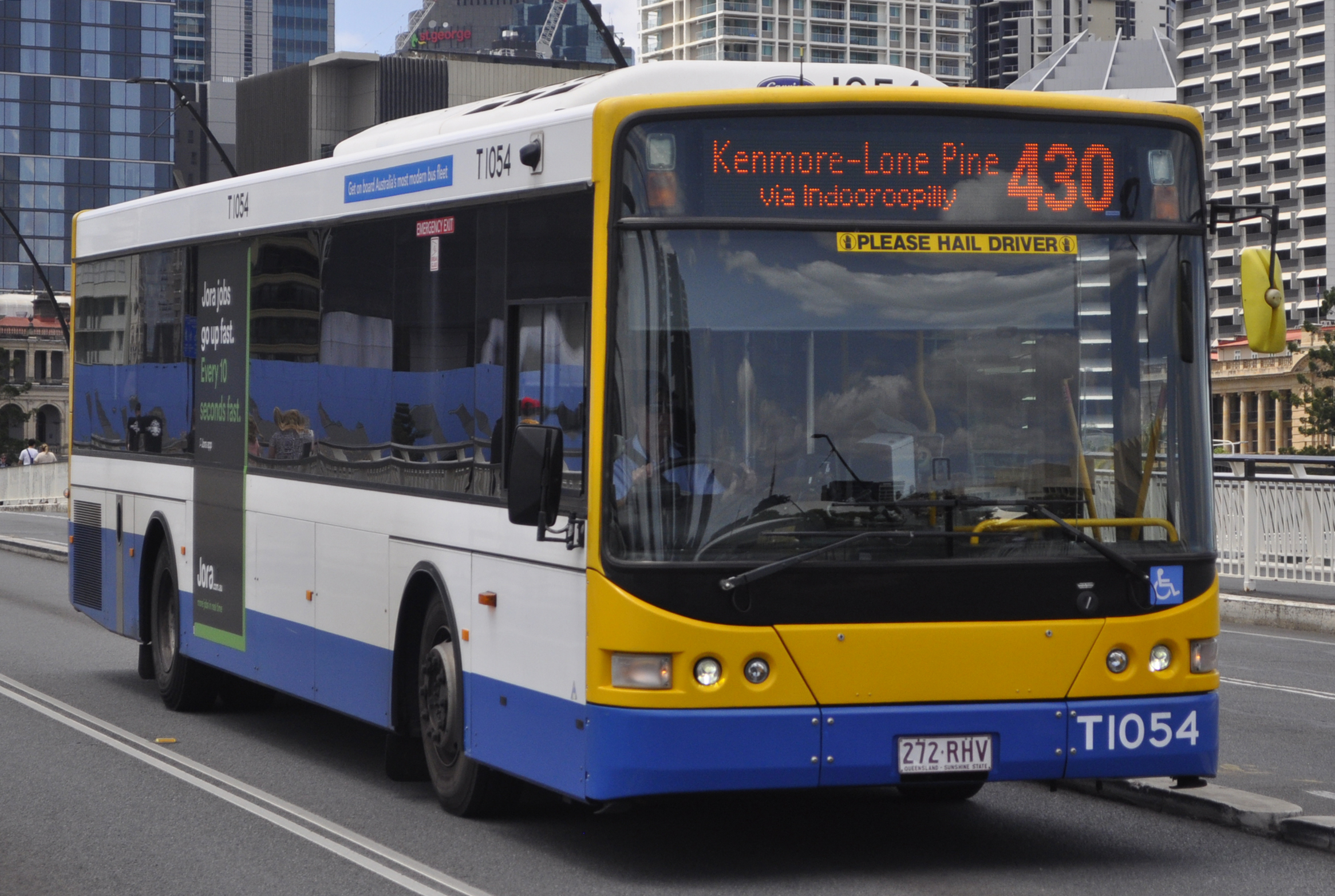
MAN 18.310 (T1054), powered by Diesel, heading towards Cultural Centre operating 430 Kenmore-Lone Pine via Indooroopilly.

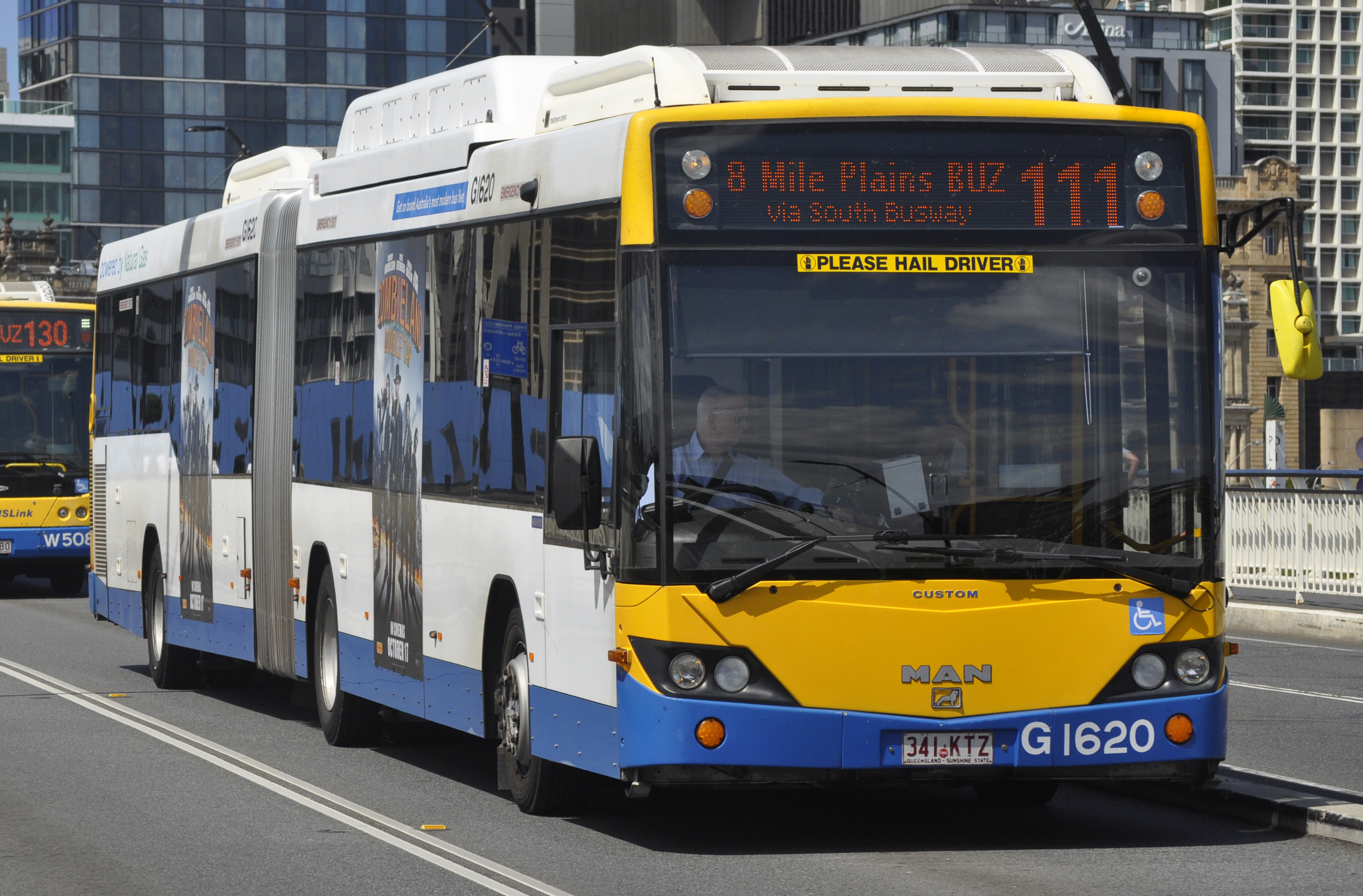
MAN NG313 artic bus (G1620), heading towards the Cultural Centre operating 111 8 Mile Plains BUZ via South Busway.

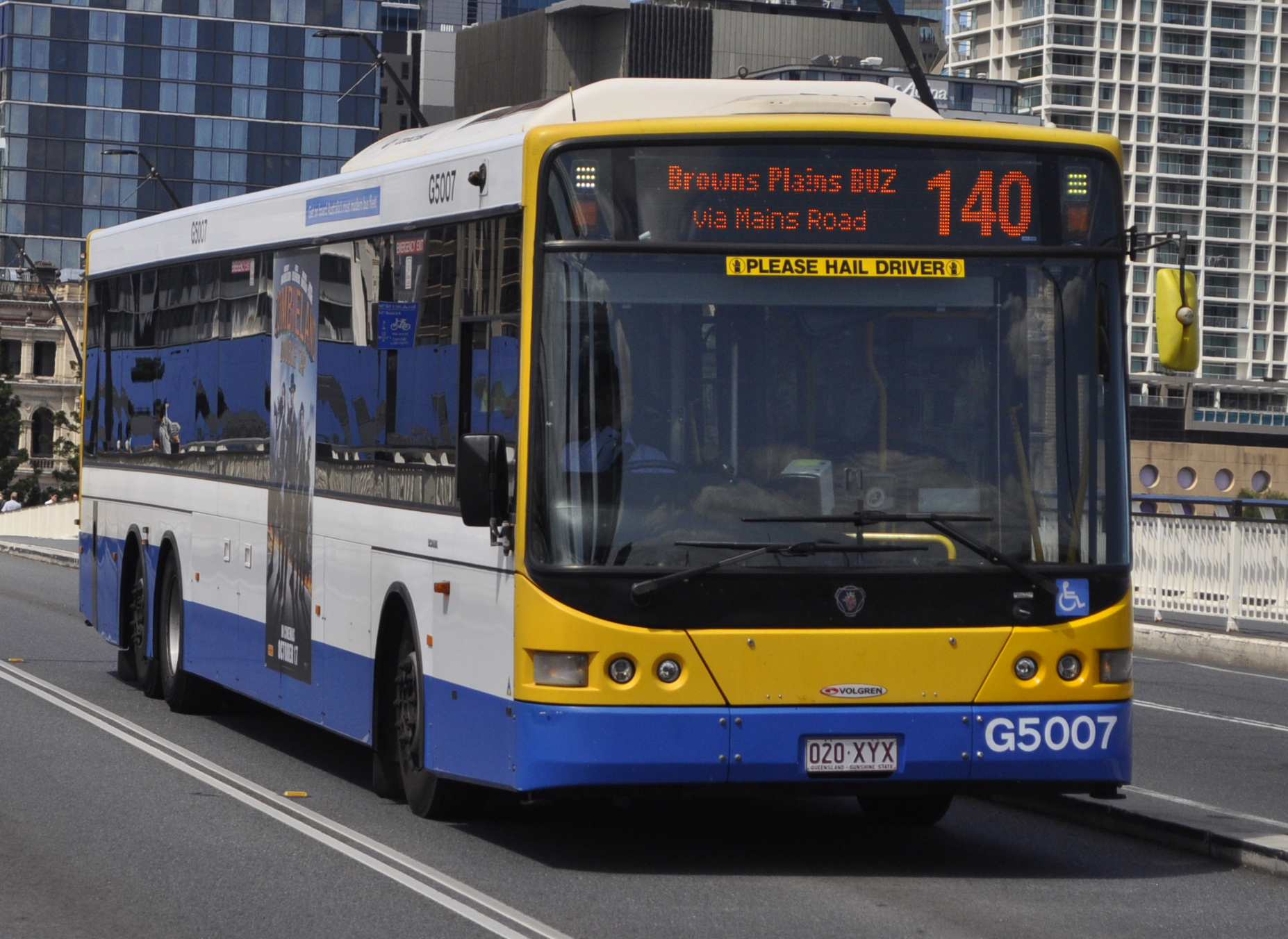
Scania K310UB6x2 (G5007) heading towards the Cultural Centre operating 140 Browns Plains BUZ via Mains Road.

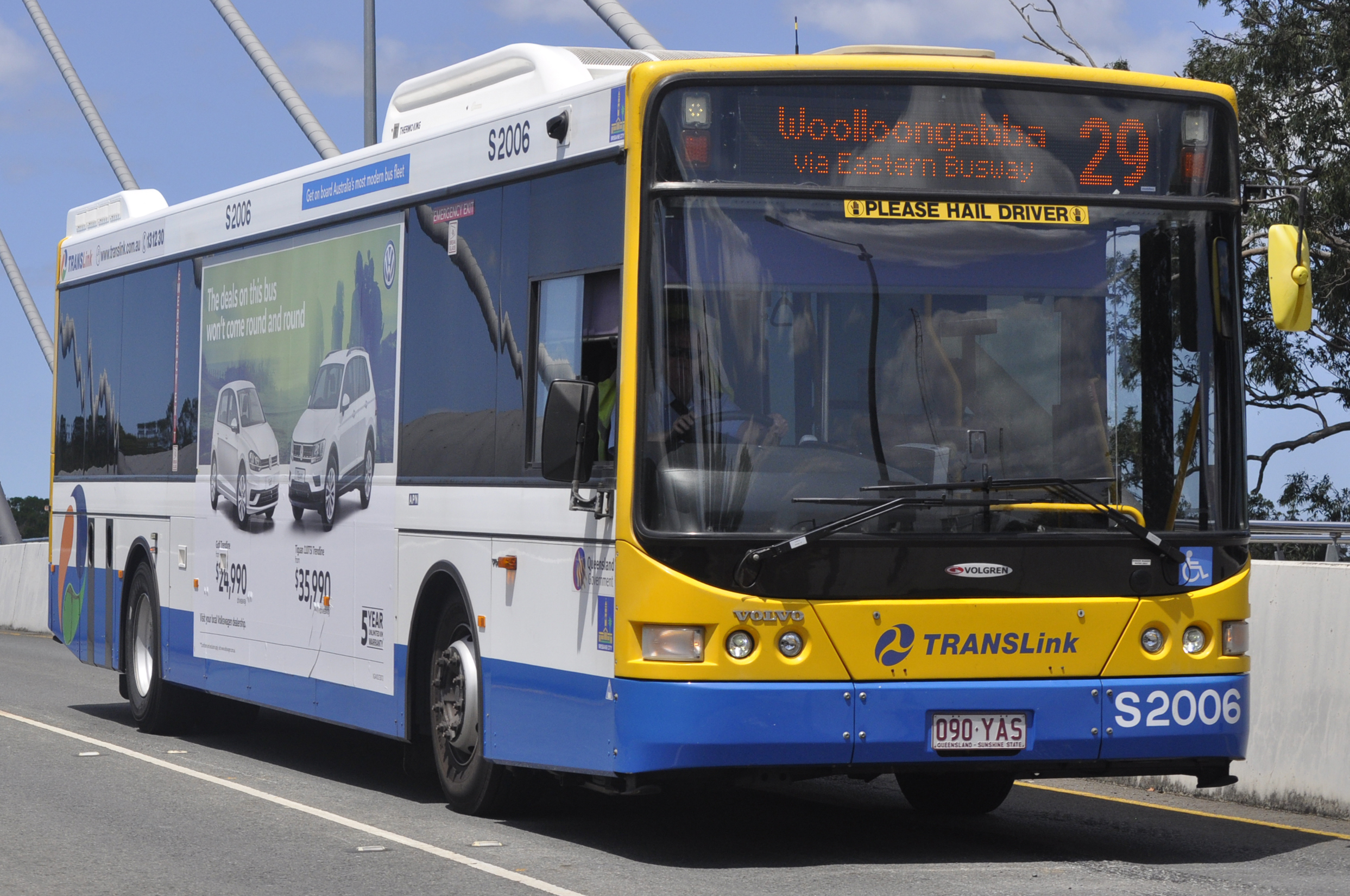
Volvo B7RLE (S2005), arriving at the UQ Lakes Bus Station operating 29 Woolloongabba via Eastern Busway.

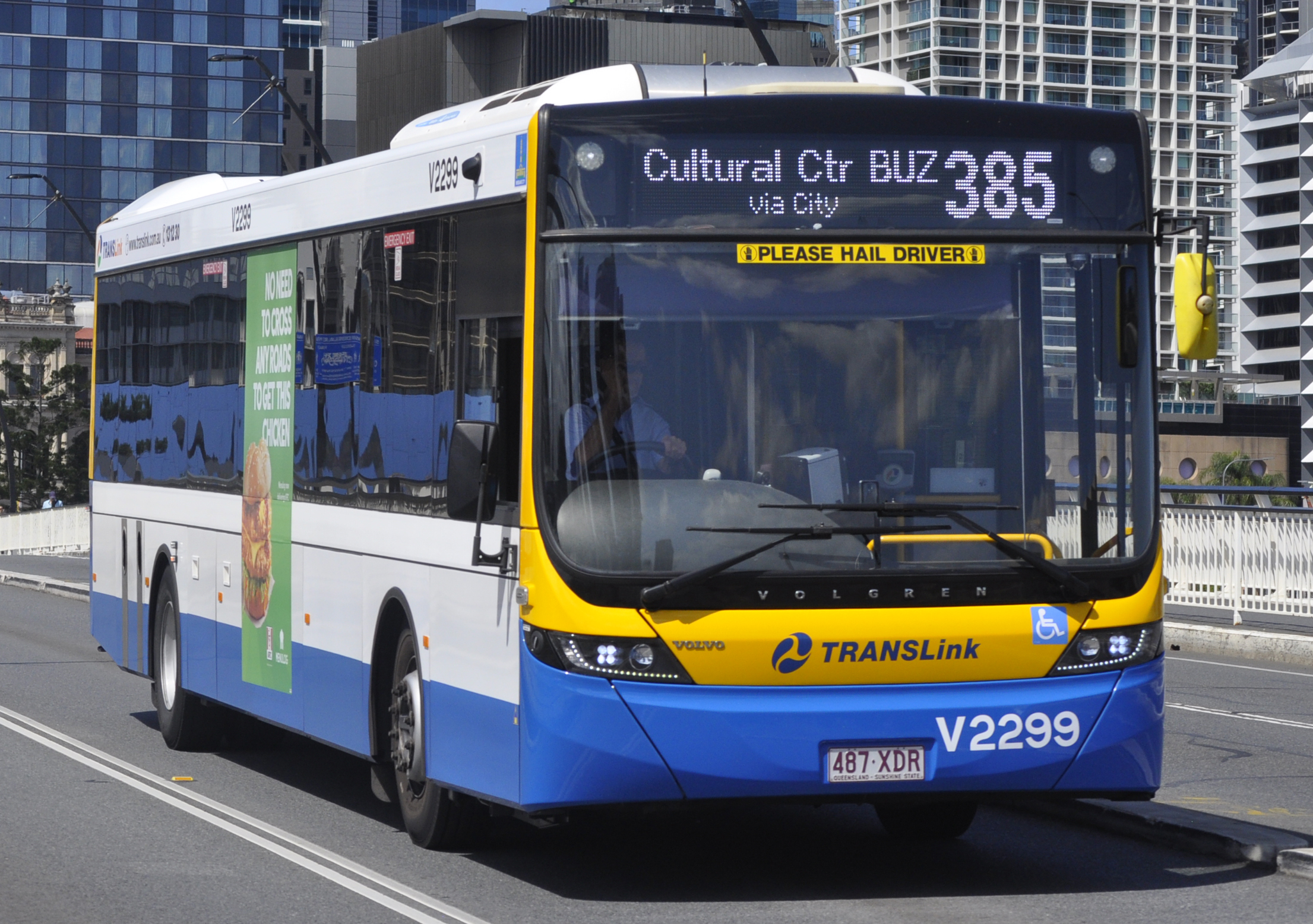
Volvo B7RLE Optimus (V2299), seen arriving at Cultural Centre operating 385 Cultural Centre BUZ via City.

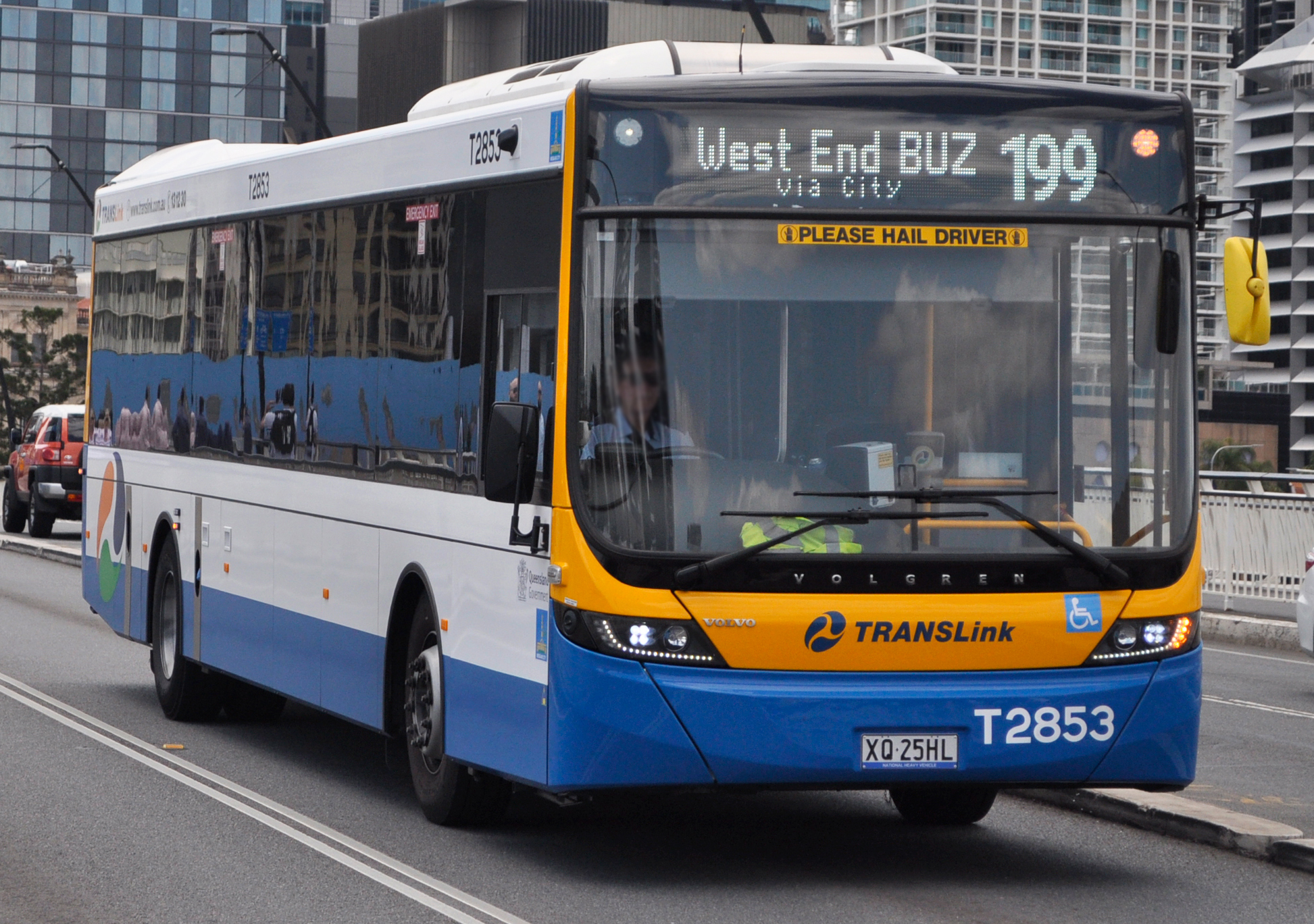
Volvo B8RLE Optimus (T2853), seen arriving at Cultural Centre operating 199 West End BUZ via City.

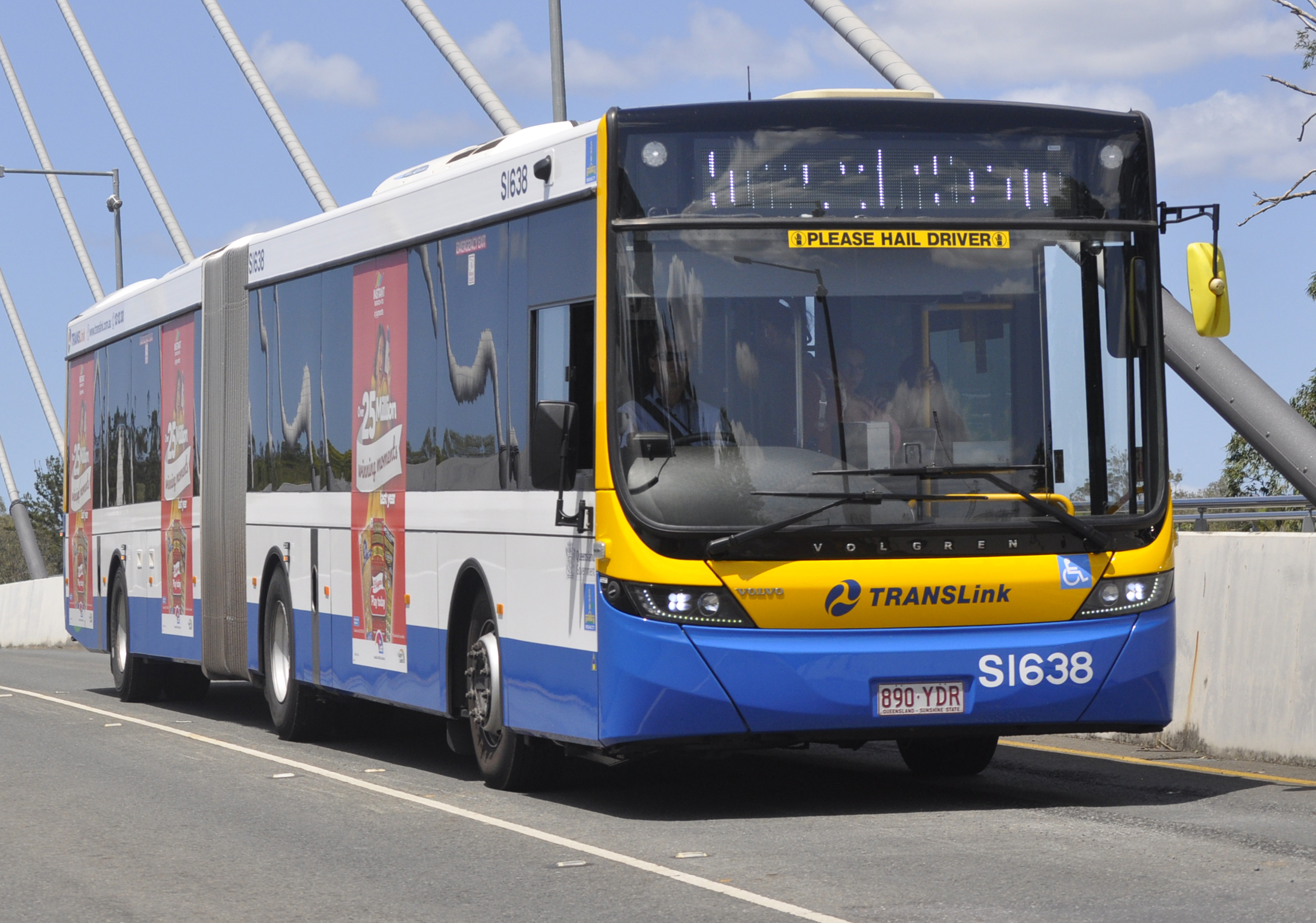
Volvo B8RLEA Optimus (S1638), arriving at the UQ Lakes Bus Station with the "Sorry... Bus Full" destination board.

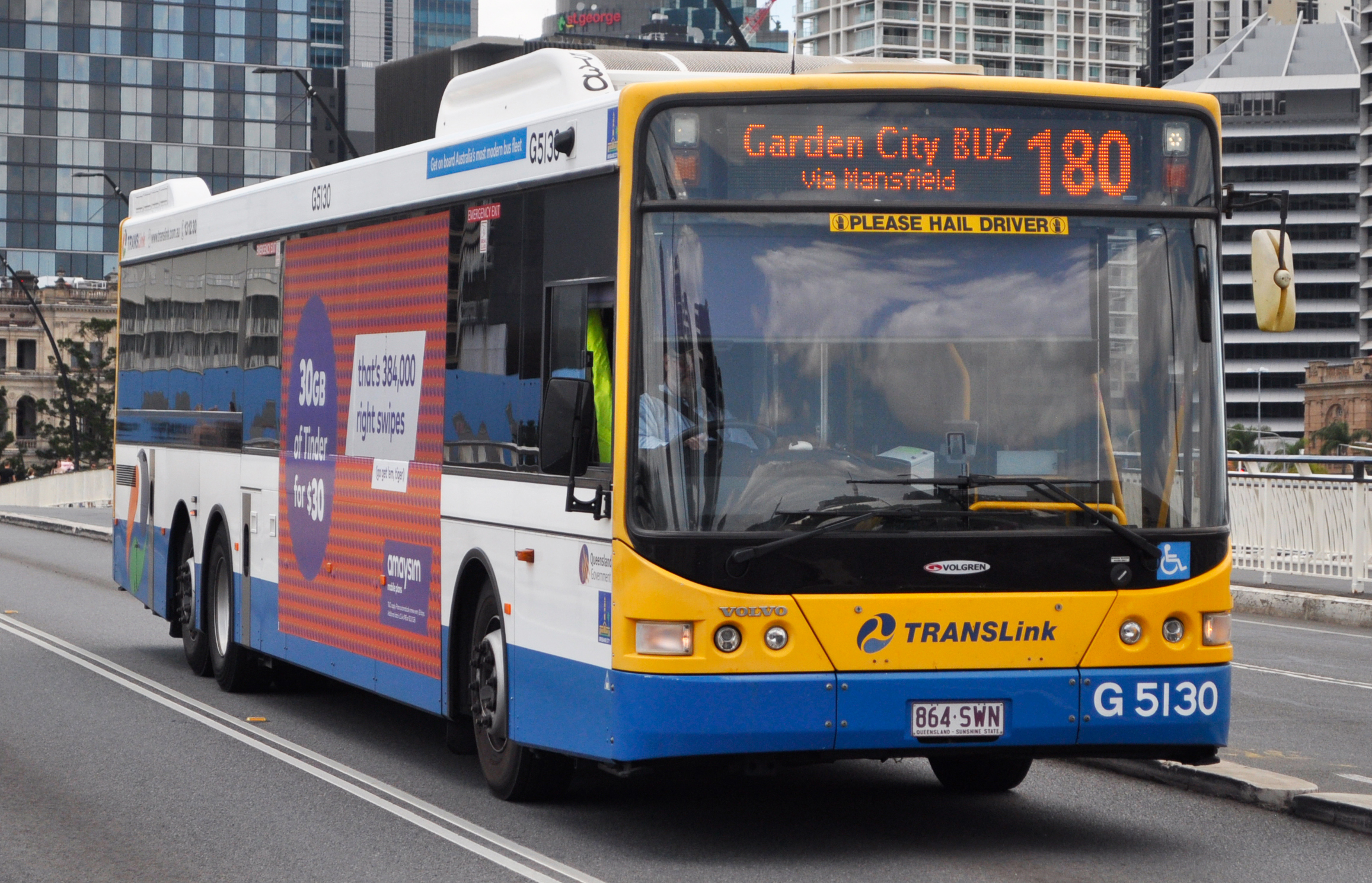
Volvo B12BLE (G5130), heading towards Cultural Centre operating 180 Garden City BUZ via Mansfield.

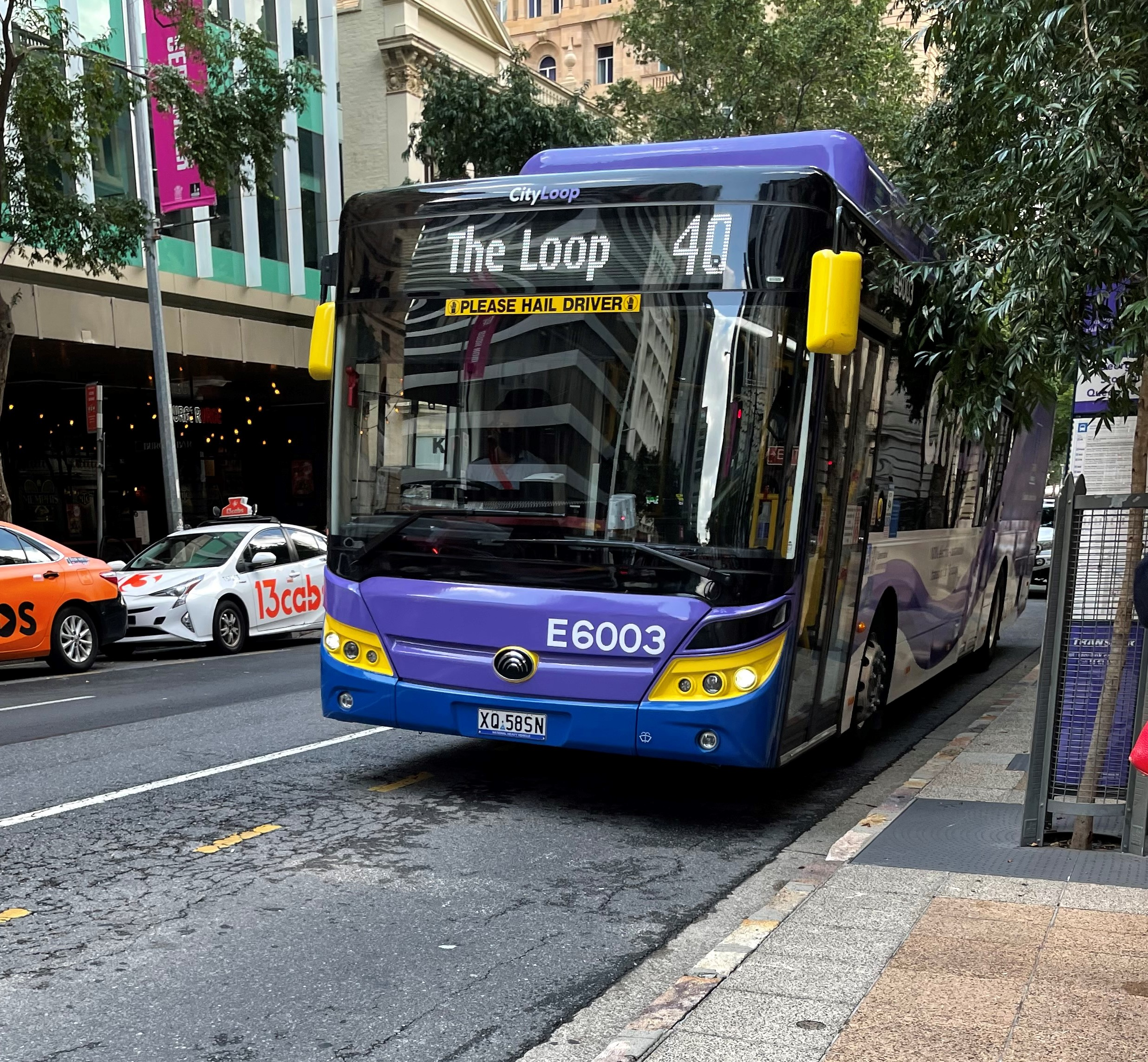
Yutong E12 (E6003) in the Transport for Brisbane Cityloop Livery. This is the first electric bus in the fleet.

=== Historic buses ===
Until the mid-1970s, heavy-duty AEC and Leyland buses were purchased. Later purchases were from European suppliers, Volvo B59s being purchased from 1976, MAN SL200s in 1982 and Volvo B10Ms from 1987.

== Depots ==
Transport for Brisbane operates its services from eight depots for specified areas. Some of these depots service routes shared in overlapping areas with other depots. Generally, each of Transport for Brisbane's buses is allocated to a particular depot, displaying a letter prefix for that depot before its fleet number, and hence is assigned to specific routes.

Current depots:

Depot	Letter Code	Location	Opened	Services / Comments	Ref(s)
Carina	C	27.490371°S 153.102078°E	1969	All eastern routes and some south-eastern routes from Carindale to the City, Wynnum, Bulimba and the Maroon CityGlider 61.	
Eagle Farm	E	27.427984°S 153.086427°E	2013	Some northern routes; all routes between New Farm and West End, Free Loops 30, 40 and 50, Blue CityGlider 60, QUT Shuttle 391.	
Garden City	G	27.56655°S 153.086731°E	1994	South-eastern routes from Browns Plains and Sunnybank to Wishart and Carindale. This depot is also the location of Brisbane Transport's head office.	
Sherwood	S	27.53504°S 152.98909°E	2012	Western, south-western and north-western routes.	
Toowong	T	27.479235°S 152.983482°E	1967	South-western and north-western routes from Brookside and The Gap.	
Virginia	V	27.365889°S 153.060885°E	1998	Most northern routes from Nudgee Beach and Brighton to Brookside and the Gap.	
Willawong	W	27.598531°S 153.004103°E	2009	Primarily southern routes including Inala and Forest Lake, some shared with other southern depots.	
Rochedale	-	27.582301402031977°S 153.1064942605426°E	2023	Brisbane Metro primary depot, serves the M1 and M2 routes.	

Past depots:

Depot	Letter Code	Location	Opened	Closed	Services / Comments	Ref(s)
Bowen Hills	A	27.435975°S 153.042313°E	2000	2013	Some northern routes; all routes between New Farm and West End. Closed in 2013 with the opening of the new depot at Eagle Farm.	
Richlands	R	27.601259°S 152.957395°E	1997	2013	A satellite depot of the Toowong depot, it shared services on western routes, and some services to Garden City.	
Larapinta	L	27.643171°S 153.007364°E	2007	2012	A satellite depot of Carina, Garden City and Willawong depots, it shared southern, western and eastern services. Originally a temporary bus depot until the Willawong depot opened, it remained open as a satellite depot, sharing routes with other southern depots, until 20 February 2012.	
Bracken Ridge	B	27.331658°S 153.02982°E	1996	2001	Only ever intended as a short-term depot, it was closed in 2001, several years after the Virginia depot had opened.	
Cribb Street, Milton	–	27.469226°S 153.007858°E	?	1983	Never a formal depot, the site was occasionally used as temporary storage for buses owing to its proximity to the Milton bus and tram workshops. Last used in 1983.	
Ipswich Road, Woolloongabba	–	27.489505°S 153.035731°E	1969?	1974	Originally shared with trams. Buses parked in the depot forecourt and at the rear (eastern end) of the tram sheds. Between 1969 and 1974, the depot was used solely by buses. The site was subsequently sold by the Brisbane City Council for commercial redevelopment. One bay of the depot building was dismantled and re-erected at the Brisbane Tramway Museum at Ferny Grove.	
Light Street, Newstead	L	27.451323°S 153.038617°E	1885	?	Closed for commercial redevelopment. First used as a depot in 1885 when it was the main tram depot for Brisbane's horse tram network. Until 1968, buses shared the depot with trams, the buses being parked along the western (Wickham Street) frontage and north of the tram shed. When the tram shed was demolished, buses were parked where the shed once stood.	
Milton	–	27.467217°S 153.00958°E	?	1969	Shared with trolleybuses and closed when the trolleybus network was abandoned in 1969. The site is now part of the King's Row business park, although the Brisbane City Council still has a parks works depot there.	

== Incidents ==
On 28 October 2016, a Volvo B7RLE, S1980, was set alight by 48 year old Anthony O'Donohue. The driver, 29 year old Manmeet Sharma, was killed in his seat while all of the passengers were safely evacuated with some receiving minor injuries. Mr. O'Donohue was found to be suffering from mental health problems and was charged with the murder of the driver and multiple counts of attempted murder. Following the fire, the bus was destroyed and the fleet number '1980' was permanently retired from the company. All buses manufactured after 2005 were to receive a physical barrier for the driver and all buses in the fleet were to receive more CCTV cameras and better signage to help with evacuation process on any of the companies buses.

On 8 March 2024, a MAN 18.310, G1273, experienced loss of control on Edward Street in Brisbane CBD, causing it to veer off the road and onto the adjoining footpath before coming to rest against the exterior of the ANZAC Square Arcade building. An 18-year-old female pedestrian, who became pinned between the bus and the building, died at the scene. The driver and four passengers were taken to hospital with minor injuries. Investigations determined that the bus had no mechanical faults and the driver was later charged with careless driving causing death.

== See also ==
- Bus transport in Queensland
- Transport in Brisbane
