= Springwood busway station =

Bus station in Springwood, Australia

Coordinates: 27°36′54″S 153°07′29″E

Springwood
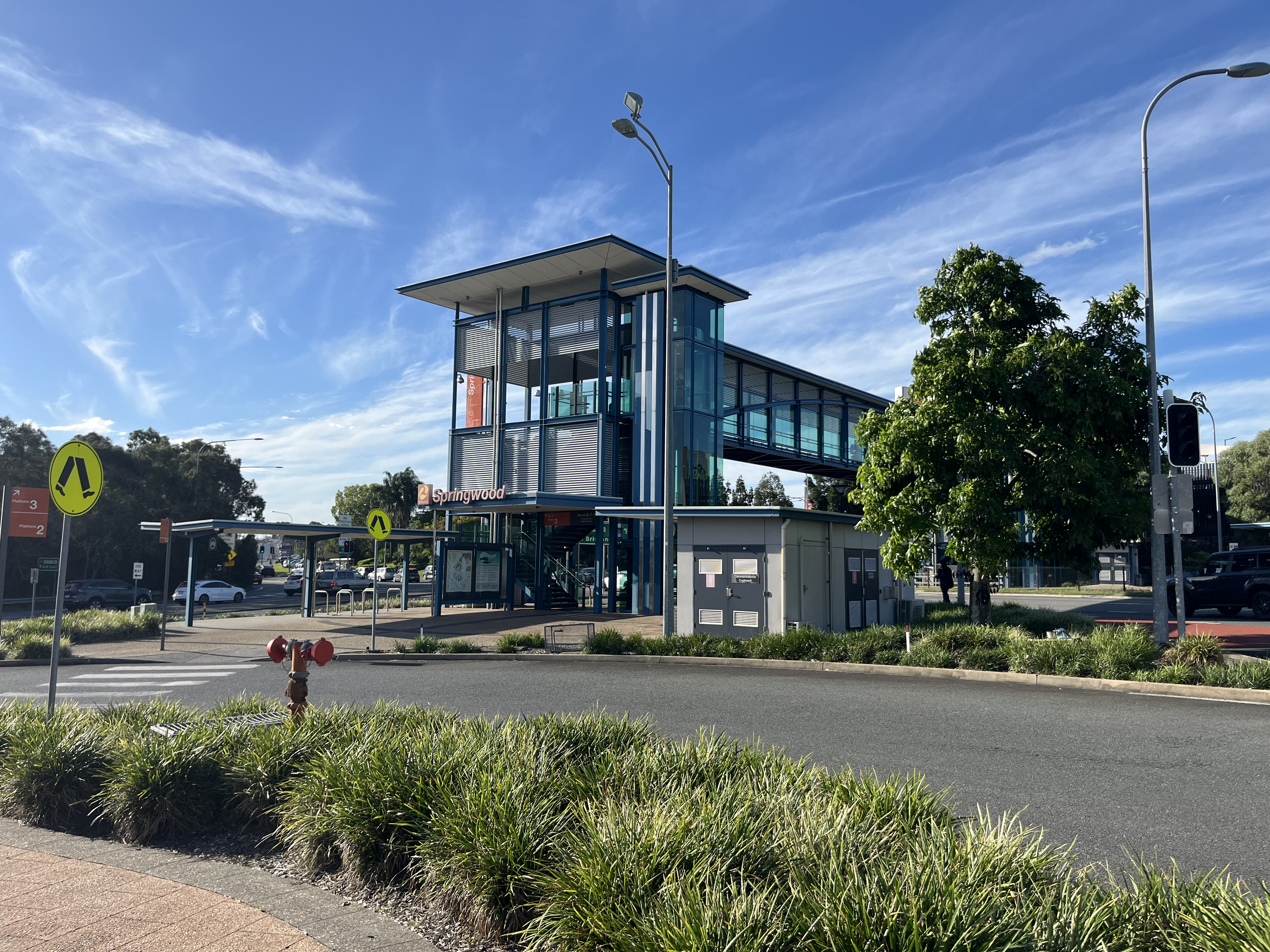
- Springwood busway station in March 2026

General information
- Location: Pacific Motorway, Fitzgerald & Vanessa Avenues, Springwood
- Owner: Department of Transport & Main Roads
- Line: South East
- Platforms: 3 side
- Bus routes: 15
- Bus operators: Clarks Logan City Bus Service

Construction
- Structure type: Ground level
- Accessible: yes

History
- Opened: 1 September 2003

Services
Preceding station	Translink	Following station
Rochedale towards King George Square	South East Busway	Terminus
Location

Springwood is a busway station operated by Translink on the South East Busway. It opened in 2003 and serves the Logan suburb of Springwood. It is a ground level station, featuring three side platforms.

== History ==
The station opened as Springwood bus station in September 2003. It was officially renamed and classed as a busway station with the extension of the South East Busway in 2025.

== Platforms and services ==
Springwood platform arrangement
Platform	Line	Direction	Routes	Notes
1	South East Busway	Inbound and Outbound	550, 551, 554, 555, 561, 572, 573, 574, 575, 576, 577, 578, 579, 580, 581	Not all routes depart from all platforms.
2	South East Busway	Inbound, West	550, 551, 554, 555, 561, 572, 573, 574, 575, 576, 577, 578, 579, 580, 581	Not all routes depart from all platforms.
3	South East Busway	Inbound, Outbound	550, 551, 554, 555, 561, 572, 573, 574, 575, 576, 577, 578, 579, 580, 581	Not all routes depart from all platforms.

The station also features a bike rack, car parking and drop off facilities.
