= Clarks Logan City Bus Service =

Australian operator of bus services

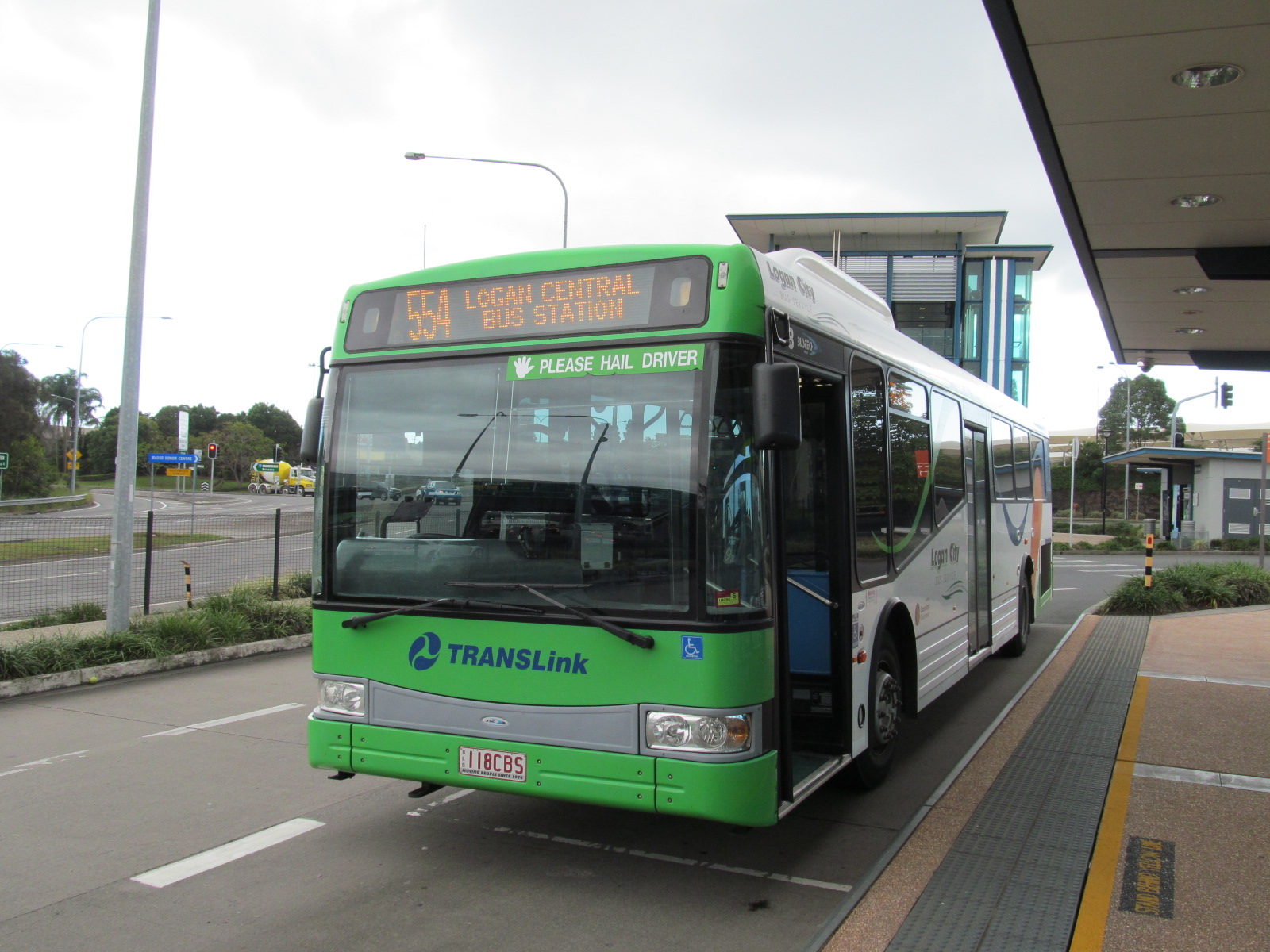
- Bustech bodied Volvo B12BLE in TransLink livery in July 2013
- Founded: 1976
- Headquarters: 42 Jutland Street, Loganlea 27°40′0.75″S 153°7′34.36″E
- Service area: South Brisbane
- Service type: Bus operator
- Routes: 28
- Depots: Loganlea 27°40′0.75″S 153°7′34.36″E
- Fleet: 127 (May 2021)
- Chief executive: Graham Davis

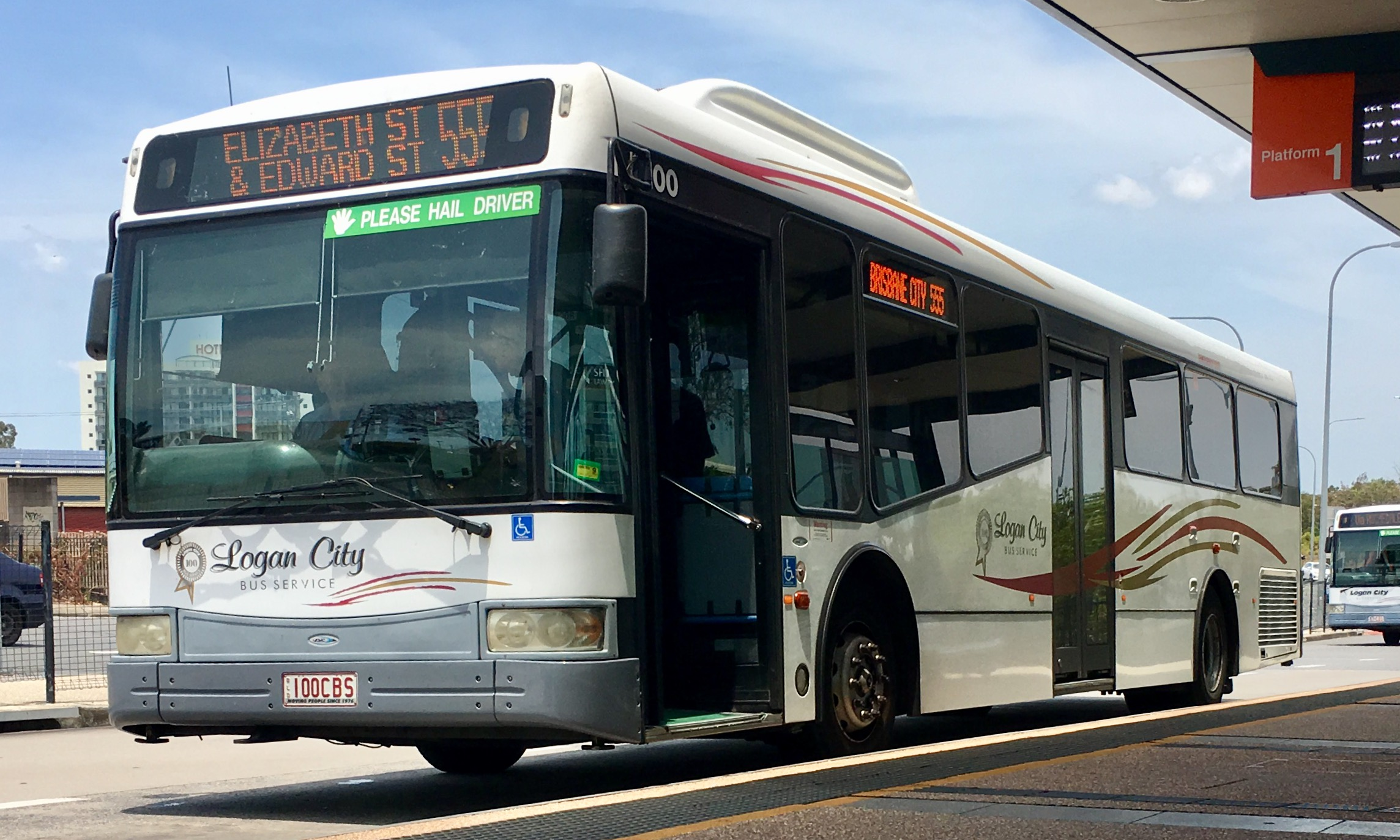
Bustech bodied Volvo B12BLE at Springwood bus station in 2016

Clarks Logan City Bus Service is an Australian operator of bus services in the southern suburbs of Brisbane. It operates 28 services under contract to the Government of Queensland under the Translink banner.

In 2008, Graham Davis became the CEO of Clarks Logan City Bus Service.

In April 2016, the operator celebrated its 40th anniversary.

== History ==
Clark's Bus Service was formed in 1976 when couple Yvonne and Reg Clark started a local school bus service in Logan City. In 1987, Clark's Bus Service purchased Greenline Bus Service in an effort to expand services to Brisbane City. In September 1995, Rochedale Bus Service was purchased. In 2003, it was rebranded as Clarks Logan City Bus Service.

== Fleet ==
As of May 2021, the fleet consists of 127 highly standardised vehicles. These consist mostly of the Volvo B12BLE chassis mounted with a VST body manufactured by Bustech.

In July 2017, Clarks Logan City Bus Service launched the new 567 route, servicing between the suburbs of Holmview and Beenleigh. This route was served by the first operational Hino Poncho outside Japan, but has since been replaced with standard operational buses due to the popularity of the route exceeding the capacity of the Poncho. It then formerly operated on the less frequent 582 route. The 582 route was retired in early 2026 and replaced with route 580 which extends to Logan Hospital via Griffith University's Logan Campus[10].
