= St Lucia, Queensland =

St Lucia
- Suburb
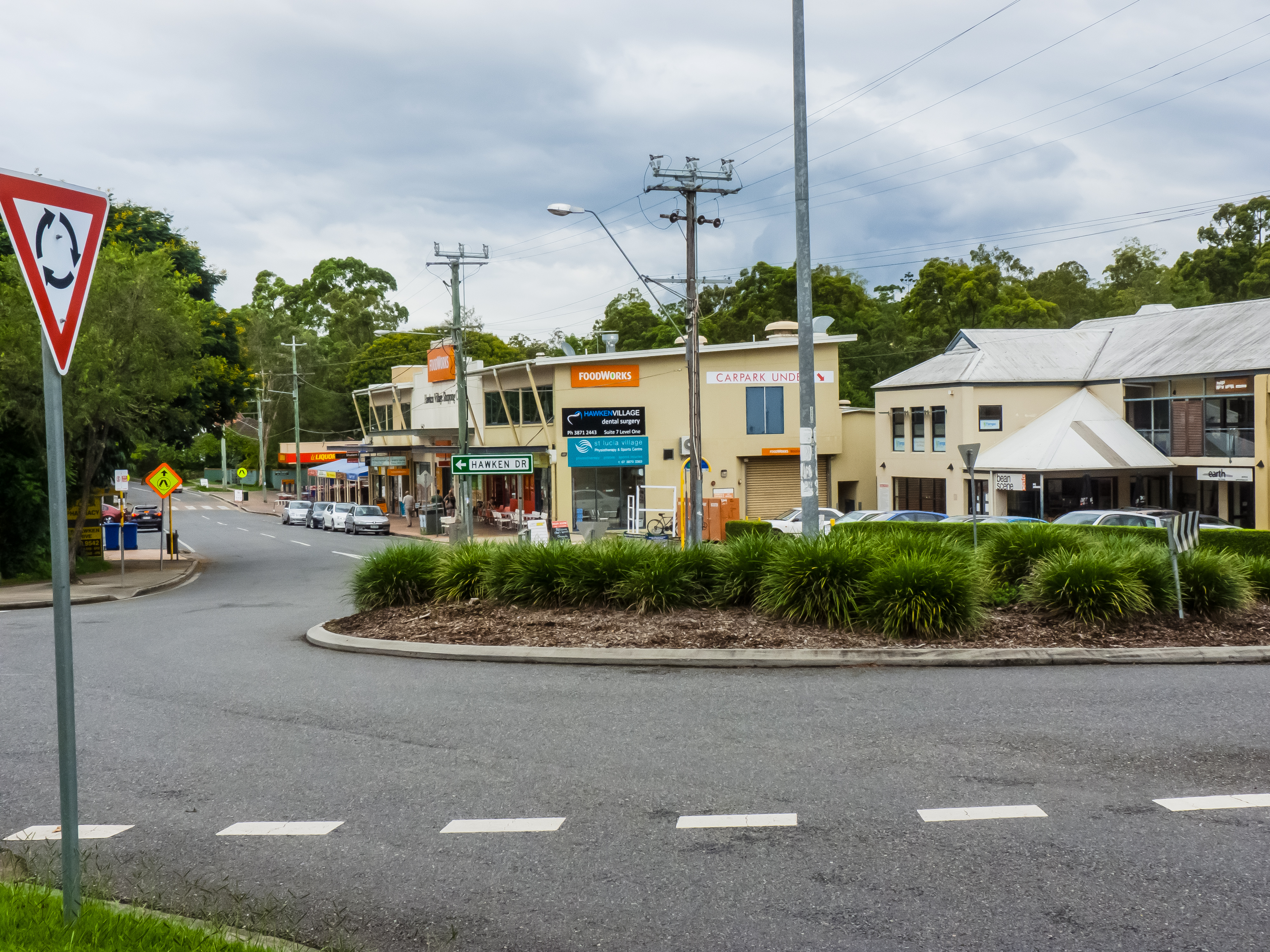
- Hawken Drive shopping precinct, 2012

- Interactive map of St Lucia
- Coordinates: 27.4983°S 153.0094°E
- Country: Australia
- State: Queensland
- City: Brisbane
- LGA: City of Brisbane (Walter Taylor Ward)
- Location: 7.3 km (4.5 mi) SW of Brisbane CBD

Government
  - State electorate: Maiwar
  - Federal division: Ryan

Area
  - Total: 4.6 km^{2} (1.8 sq mi)

Population
  - Total: 12,220 (2021 census)
  - Density: 2,657/km^{2} (6,880/sq mi)
- Time zone: UTC+10:00 (AEST)
- Postcode: 4067
Suburbs around St Lucia
Toowong	West End	Highgate Hill
Taringa	St Lucia	Dutton Park
Indooroopilly	Yeronga	Fairfield

St Lucia is a riverside suburb in the City of Brisbane, Queensland, Australia. The University of Queensland is the main attraction of St Lucia, with the university and its residential colleges covering a large proportion of the suburb. According to the 2021 census, St Lucia had a population of 12,220.

== Geography ==
St Lucia is located 7.3 kilometres (4.5 mi) by road southwest of the Brisbane GPO. The suburb sits on a peninsula, bounded on the north, east and south by the median in a bend of the Brisbane River. The eastern third of the suburb is occupied by the main campus of the University of Queensland. The flatter area on the northern side is primarily medium to high density residential, including some high-rise apartments on the riverfront. The more hilly area in the centre and south is mainly low-density, family-occupied residential. The south-west is occupied by the St Lucia Golf Links.

Ironside is a neighbourhood within the suburb (27.5°S 153.0000°E).

The Elbow is the name for the easternmost part of the suburb (27.5011°S 153.02°E), where the Brisbane River makes a sharp bend.

There are two reaches of the Brisbane River surrounding the suburb:

- St Lucia Reach (27.4913°S 153.0033°E), to the north of the suburb.
- Cemetery Reach (27.4980°S 153.0211°E), to the east of the suburb, with the name referring to the South Brisbane Cemetery on the opposite side of the river in the suburb of Dutton Park.

Six Mile Rocks are rocks in the Brisbane River to the south of the suburb (27.5041°S 153.0094°E).

Three creeks flow through the suburb:

- Toowong Creek (27.4899°S 152.9947°E), which enters the river in the northwest of the suburb.
- Carmody Creek (27.4959°S 153.0185°E), which flows through the University of Queensland campus and enters the river in the east of the suburb.
- Sandy Creek (27.5066°S 153.0002°E), which flows easterly from Robertson Park, through the St Lucia Golf Course, and enters the river in the southwest of the suburb.

== History ==
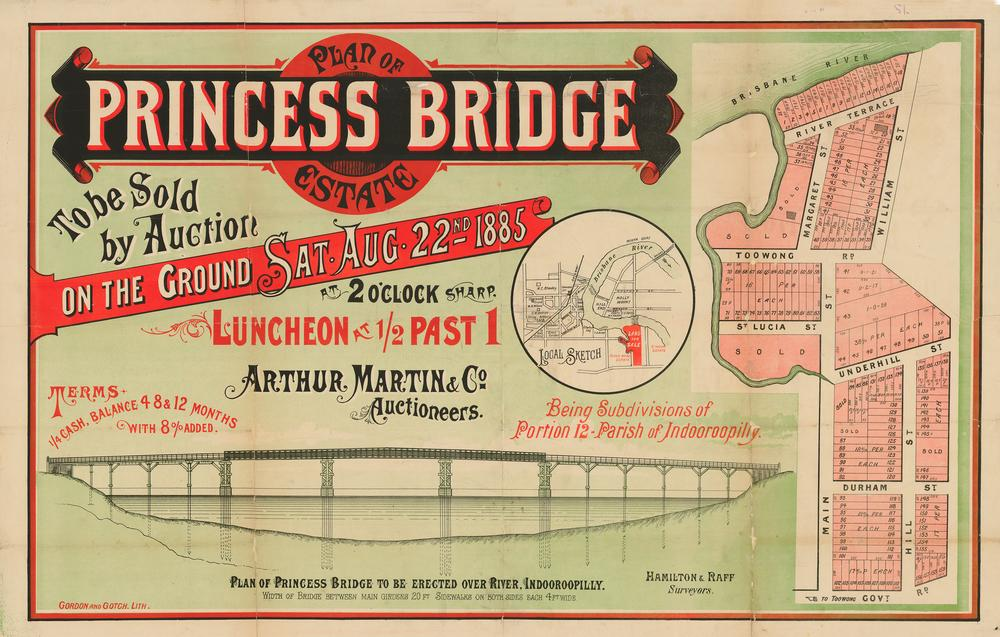
Estate map of Princess Bridge Estate, St. Lucia

The area was originally part of Indooroopilly and later became a part of Toowong. Initially known as Indooroopilly Pocket, it was briefly called Toowong South before a portion of the area was separated and named as Lang Farm.

Sugar plantations were established in the area in the 1860s. In 1882, William Alexander Wilson, who was born in St Lucia in the West Indies, purchased the Coldridge Plantation and renamed it St Lucia Sugar Plantation. The plantation was subdivided for housing in 1883, and the name was transferred to the subdivision.

Toowong Mixed State School opened on 10 October 1870. It was renamed Indooroopilly State School in 1879, and then Indooroopilly Pocket State School in 1888. In October 1904, it was renamed Ironside State School after the neighbouring estate of John Dunmore Lang.

== Demographics ==
According to the 2021 census, St Lucia had a population of 12,220, with a gender distribution of 49.3% male and 50.7% female. This gender distribution closely mirrors the national average.

The median age in St Lucia was 25 years, significantly younger than the Australian median of 38 years. Children under 15 years comprised 10.7% of the population, while those aged 65 and over made up 10.9%. Notably, 38.2% of St Lucia’s population was aged between 15 and 24 years, compared to 12.4% nationally.

In terms of birthplace, 54.5% of St Lucia residents were born in Australia, compared to 66.9% nationally. The next most common countries of birth were China (7.4%), England (3.0%), India (2.8%), Malaysia (2.6%), and New Zealand (1.8%).

Regarding language, 63.1% of people spoke only English at home, compared to 72.0% nationally. Other most commonly spoken languages included Mandarin (10.1%), Cantonese (1.7%), Spanish (1.5%), Bengali (1.3%), and Vietnamese (1.2%).

When it came to religion, the most common response was "no religion" (47.8%), compared to 38.4% nationally. Other most common religions were Catholicism (14.4%), Anglicanism (7.7%), and Islam (4.7%).

In the 2016 census, St Lucia had a population of 12,574.

In the 2011 census, St Lucia had a population of 11,195.

== Heritage listings ==
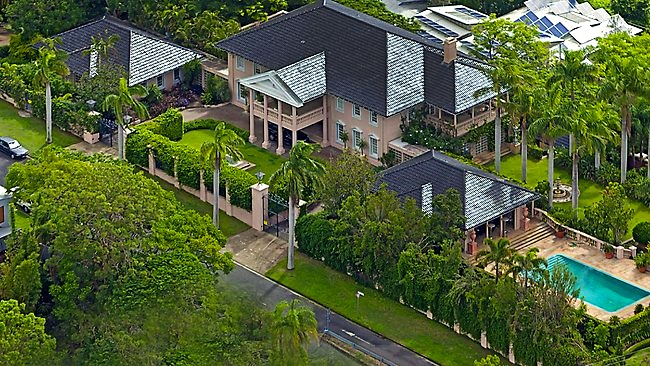
The Pink Palace, St Lucia

St Lucia has a number of heritage-listed sites, including:

- 12 Upland Road (27.4968°S 153.0133°E): Great Court, the University of Queensland.
- 38 Upland Road (27.5005°S 153.011°E): Union College.
- 99 Sir Fred Schonell Drive (27.4945°S 152.9986°E): Vida and Jayne Lahey's House.
- 378 Swann Road (27.5004°S 152.9964°E): Ironside State School.
- 396 Swann Road (27.5017°S 152.9945°E): Langer House.

Although never heritage-listed, one of St Lucia's most iconic homes was the so-called "The Pink Palace" at 272 Swann Road until it was demolished in 2016.

== Education ==
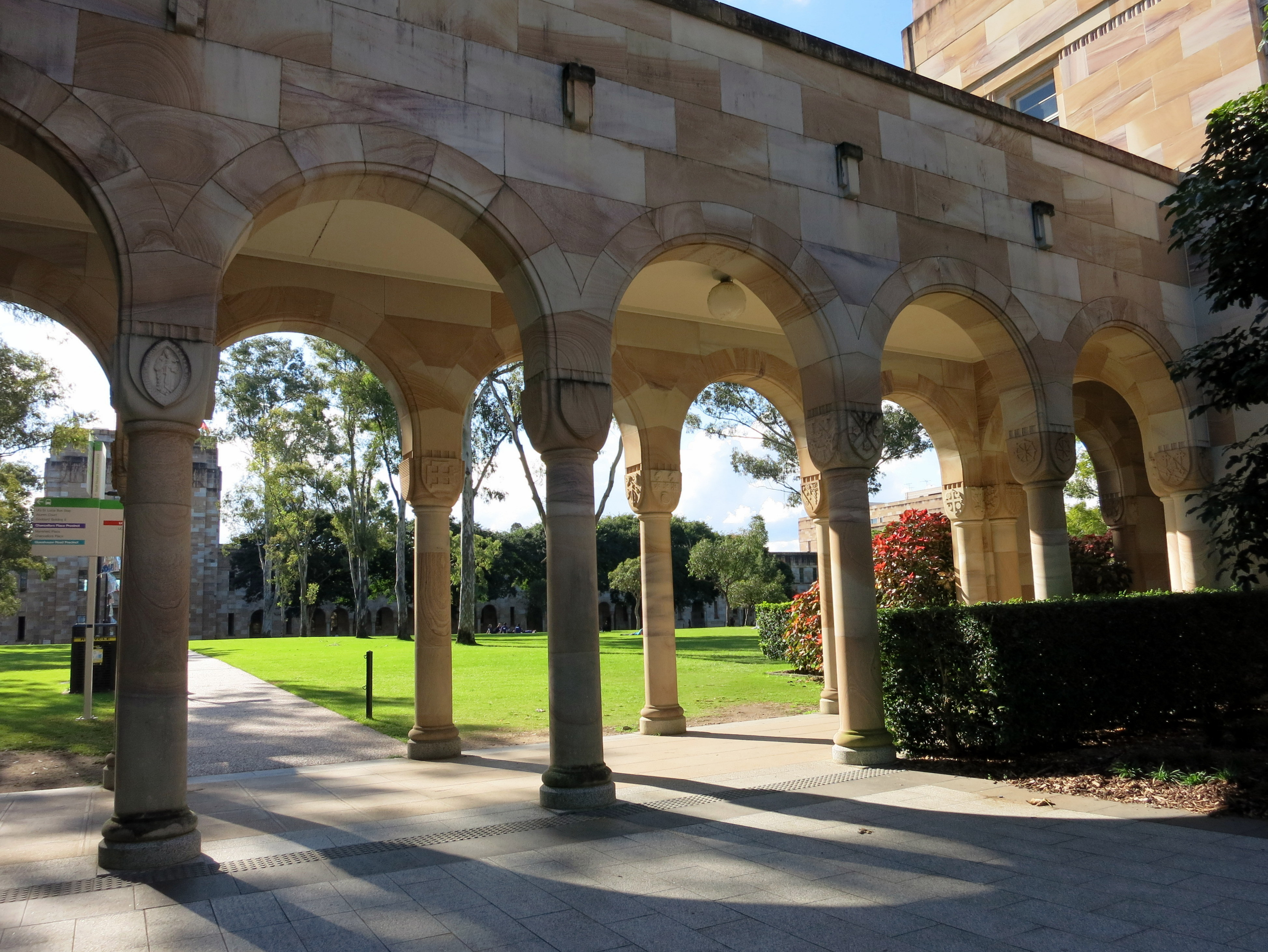
University of Queensland, St Lucia

Ironside State School is a government primary (Prep–6) school for boys and girls at 2 Hawken Drive (27.5009°S 152.9959°E). As of February 2024, the school had an enrolment of 929 students. In 2023, the school had 62 full-time equivalent teaching and 18 full-time equivalent non-teaching staff.

While there are no secondary schools in St Lucia, several high schools are nearby. The nearest secondary schools include Indooroopilly State High School and St Peters Lutheran College in Indooroopilly as well as Brisbane Boys' College and the Queensland Academy of Science, Mathematics and Technology (QAMST) in Toowong.

St Lucia hosts the main campus of the University of Queensland, a public research university. The campus spans much of this riverside inner suburb. As of 2024, the University has 7,504 full-time equivalent staff members, and in 2023, the total number of students was 55,424.

== Amenities ==
Several small shopping precincts are located throughout the suburb, but it is primarily residential. The main precinct is a strip of stores along Hawken Drive. This strip includes a local IGA Supermarket, various international restaurants, a medical centre, dentist office, and a post office/news agency. Friday nights are particularly popular for dining out, as many residents enjoy eating at these restaurants.

St Lucia is home to several places of worship, including St Lucia Uniting Church (7 Hawken Drive), St Thomas Aquinas Catholic Church (87 Central Avenue), St Lucia Evangelical Church, part of the Chinese Christian Church Brisbane (83 Ryans Road), and Christ Church St Lucia, part of the Anglican Church of Southern Queensland (9 Ninth Avenue). It is a liberal Anglo-Catholic church. The University of Queensland have a multi-faith chaplaincy service. It offers an inclusive space for students, staff, and the wider University of Queensland community from various faiths.

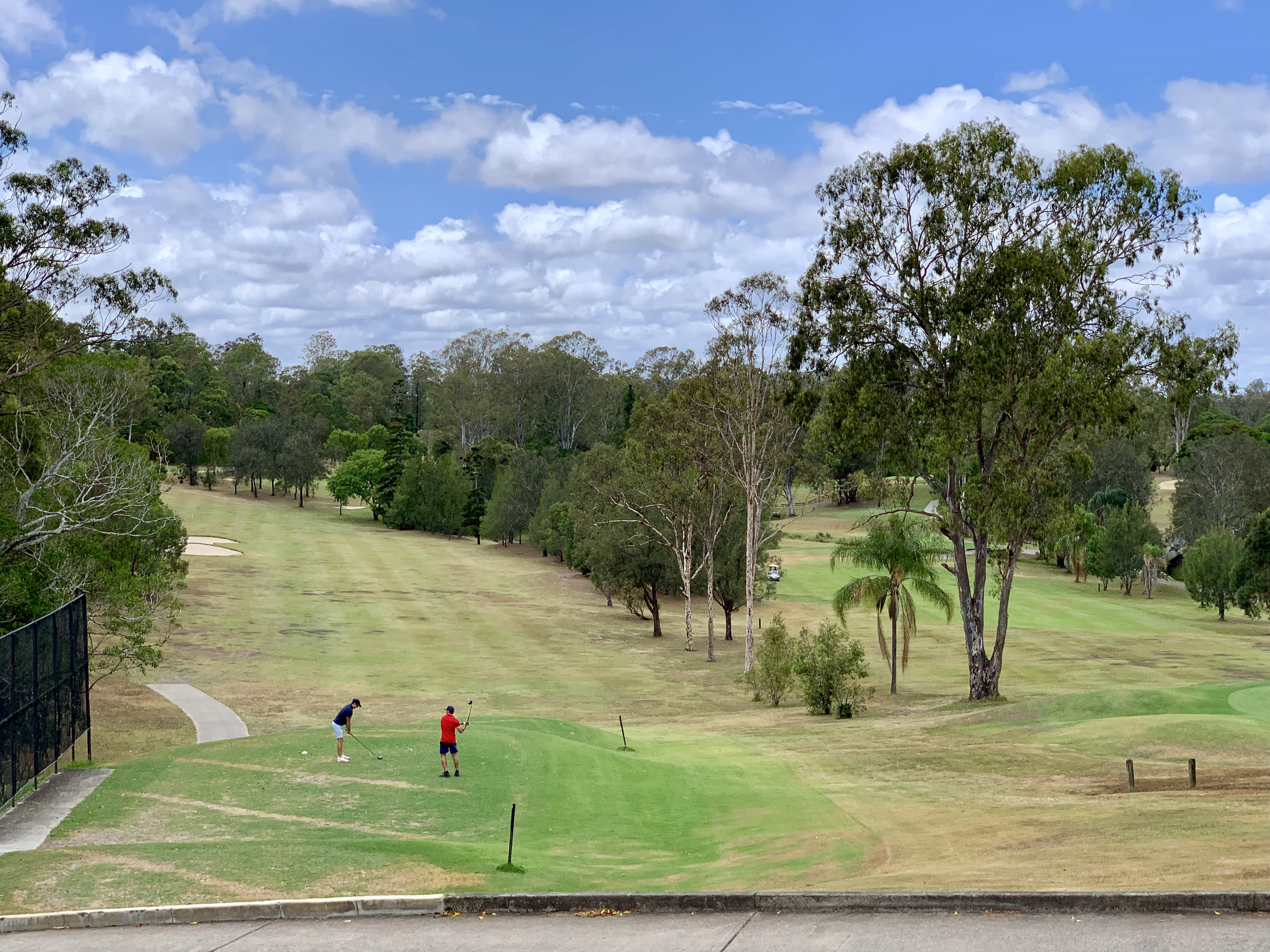
St Lucia Golf Links, St Lucia

The Schonell Theatre hosts many performances that the members of the public can attend by purchasing tickets. The theatre, built in 1970 and refurbished in 2005, is owned and managed by the University of Queensland Union (UQU). In 2019, the theatre was planned for demolition as part of the UQU Complex redevelopment plan. However, in 2022, the demolition plans were abandoned due to a lack of community support.

The Avalon Theatre, built in the 1920s, has served the St Lucia community as a church hall, community hall, and cinema. The University of Queensland acquired the property in February 1963. By 1975, the building was repurposed as a teaching space. Although it was closed in 2004 due to its age, the theatre was restored and reopened in July 2024, now offering space for students, staffs, and eventually clubs, societies, and the wider community.

There are 15 parks in St Lucia, many with seating facilities, playground, and picnic area. Carawa Street Park has a dog off-leash area. These parks are maintained by the Brisbane City Council.

== Sports ==
St Lucia Golf Links is an 18-hole pay-and-play public golf course located at the corner of Indooroopilly Road and Carawa Street. The golf course is one of Brisbane's oldest and has hosted several Queensland Open and PGA tournaments. The course layout accommodates golfers of all skill levels.

St Lucia Bowls Club, situated at 9 Carr Street near the University of Queensland, was established in 1947. The club features two bowling greens and offers a variety of men's, women's, and mixed competitions. Additionally, it participates in several inter-club events, including District Pennants.

Toowong Rowing Club, established in 1889, was originally based in Toowong. After multiple relocations due to floods, it finally settled at 37 Keith Street, St Lucia, in 1976. The club boasts a diverse membership, including juniors, high-performance athletes, veterans, honorary life members, recreational rowers, and social members.

The University of Queensland provides public access to its swimming pools, tennis courts, and other amenities, although some facilities require a fee.

== Events ==
Every Saturday morning at 7 a.m., the free St Lucia 5 km parkrun takes place near the University of Queensland, opposite the UQ Aquatics Centre on Sir William Macgregor Drive.

== Transport ==
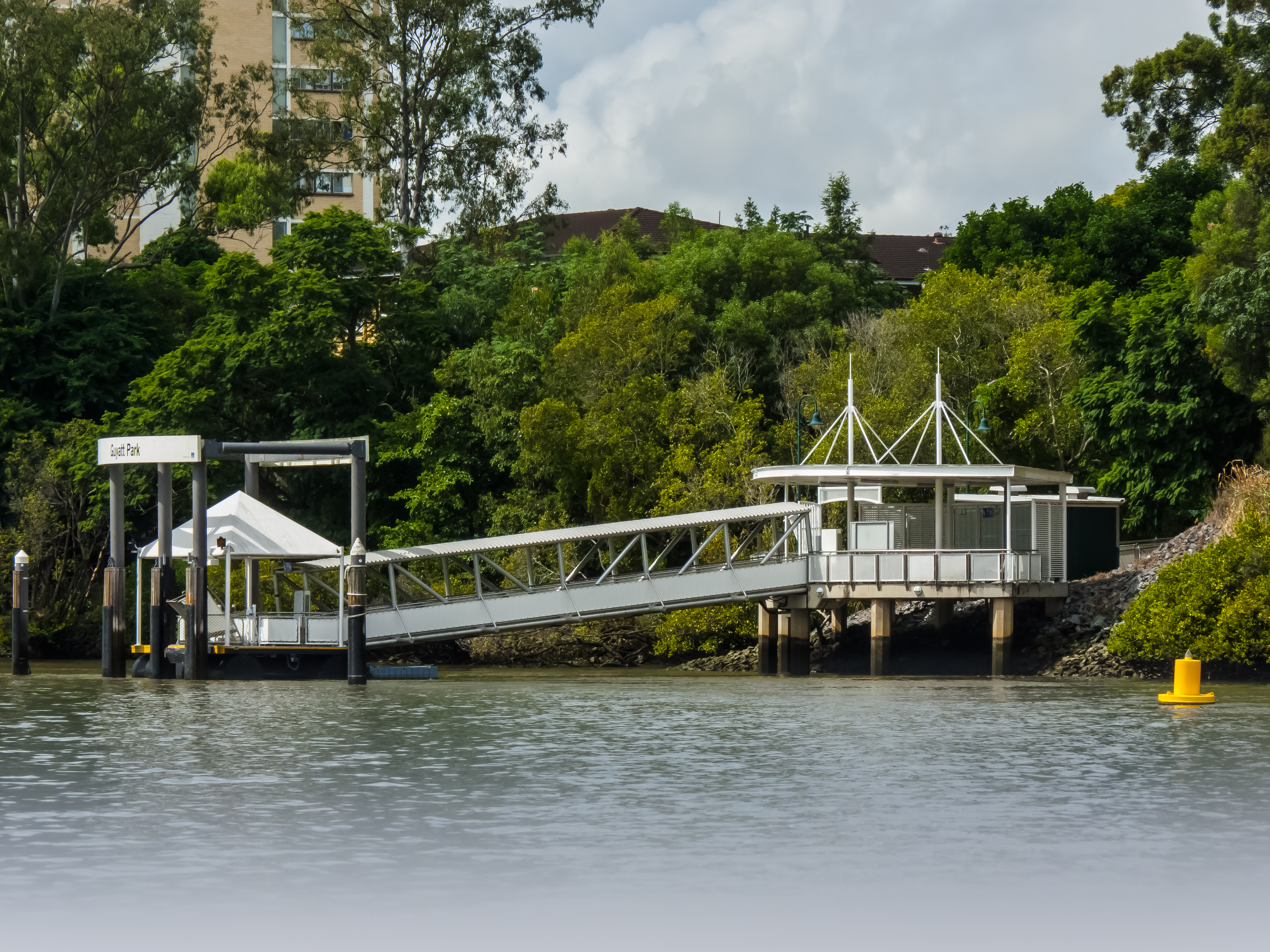
Guyatt Park Ferry Terminal, St Lucia

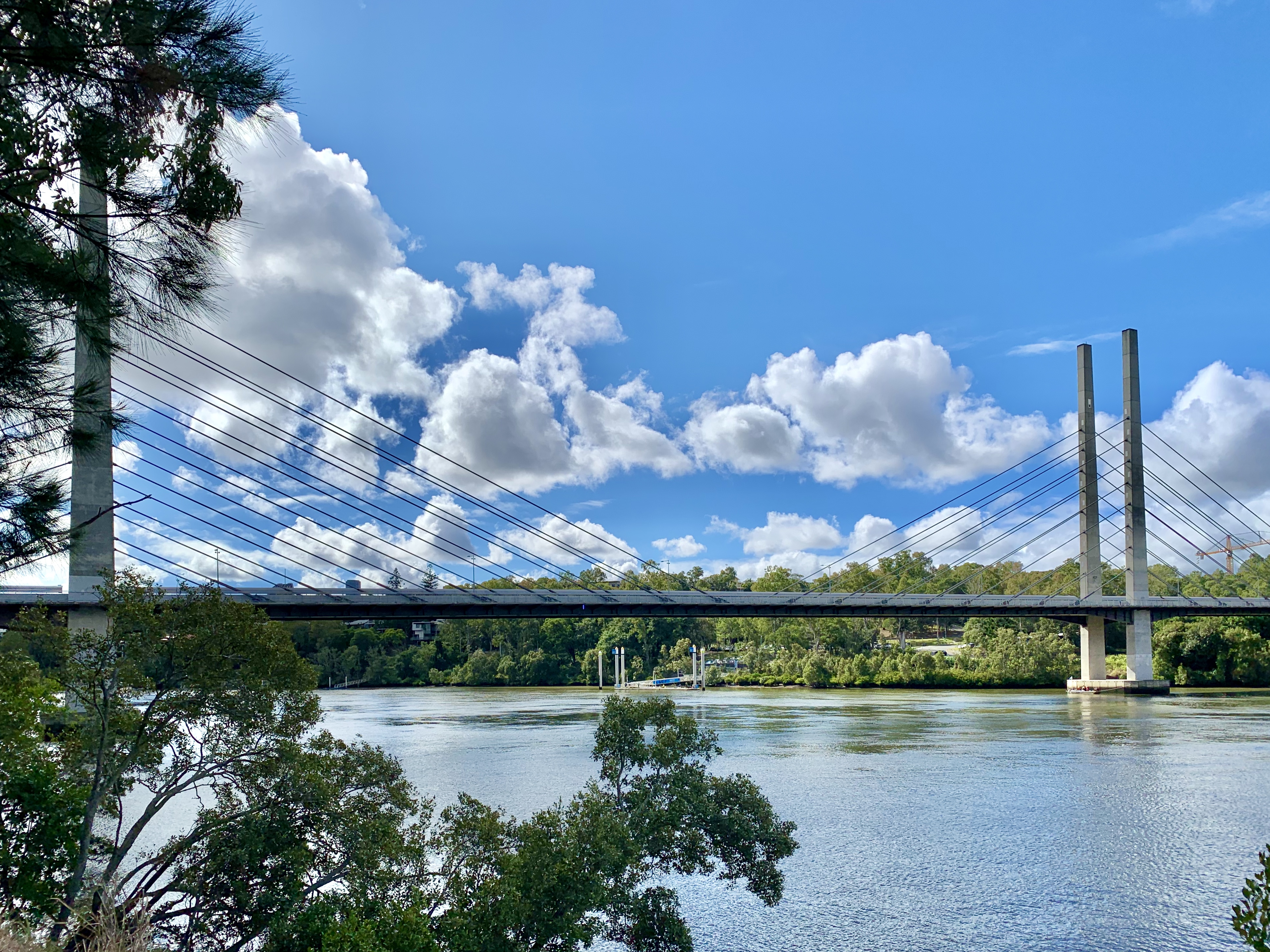
Eleanor Schonell Bridge

St Lucia can be accessed by bus from the western suburbs and Brisbane CBD, with routes terminating at the University of Queensland Bus Station. There is also a NightLink service, a safety initiative that provides buses with security on board all night on Fridays and Saturdays. The Eleanor Schonell Bridge, a dedicated bus, pedestrian, and bicycle bridge, connects the University with Dutton Park, and carries buses from the southern suburbs, CBD, and the Royal Brisbane and Women's Hospital to the UQ Lakes Busway Station on the St Lucia campus.

St Lucia can be accessed by ferries from the CBD. The CityCat stops at two terminals in St Lucia, the Guyatt Park CityCat Terminal and the University of Queensland Terminal.

St Lucia has bicycle routes that utilise the residential streets between the University of Queensland and Toowong.

St Lucia has three major thoroughfares, which all lead to the University of Queensland: Swann Road, Sir Fred Schonell Drive, and The Esplanade.

There is no train station in St Lucia. The nearby train stations are the Toowong, Taringa, and Indooroopilly railway stations.

== Politics ==
St Lucia is within the:

- Brisbane City Council's Walter Taylor Ward.
- Queensland Legislative Assembly's electoral district of Maiwar.
- Australian Government's division of Ryan.
