= Ironside State School =

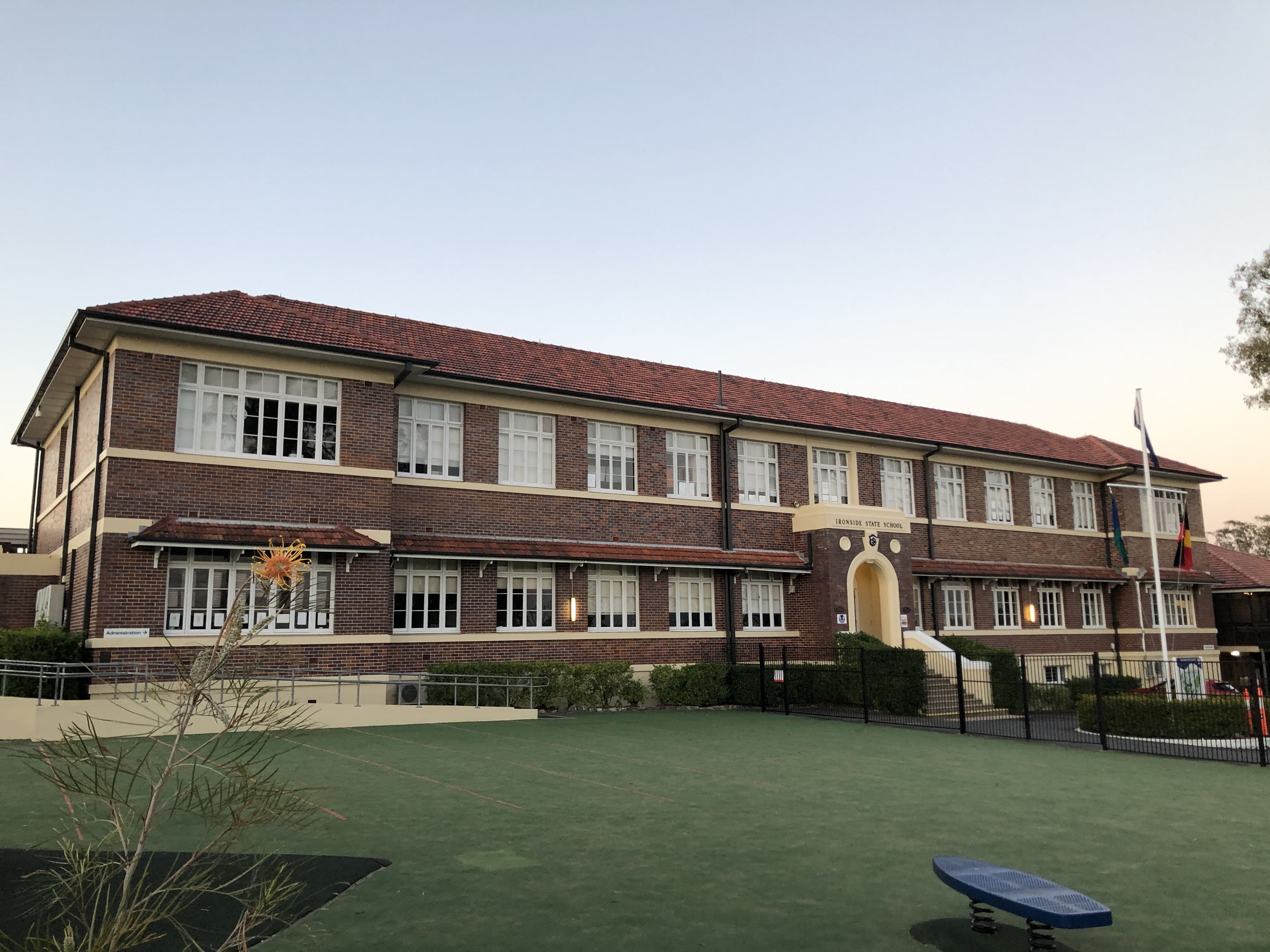
- Ironside State School, 2020

- Location within Queensland
- 27.5004°S 152.9964°E
- Location: 378 Swann Road, St Lucia, City of Brisbane, Queensland, Australia

History
- Design period: 1919–1930s (Interwar period)
- Built: 1935–1959, 1940–1955, 1953–1955

Site notes
- Elevation: 43 m (141 ft)
- Height: All buildings are either 2 or 3 stories tall.
- Architectural style: Classicism

Queensland Heritage Register
- Official name: Ironside State School
- Type: state heritage
- Designated: 27 July 2018
- Reference no.: 650060
- Type: Education, Research, Scientific Facility: School – state (primary)
- Theme: Educating Queenslanders: Providing primary schooling

Ironside State School is a heritage-listed state school located at 378 Swann Road, St Lucia, City of Brisbane, Queensland, Australia. It was built from 1935 to 1959. It was added to the Queensland Heritage Register on 27 July 2018.

== History ==
Ironside State School, established in 1870, (as Toowong Provisional School and later renamed Toowong State School, Indooroopilly State School, and Indooroopilly Pocket State School) is located in the Brisbane suburb of St Lucia, about 4.5 km southwest of the Brisbane central business district (CBD). It is important in demonstrating the evolution of state education and its associated architecture. The school retains a Depression-era brick school building (1935–59) designed by the Queensland Department of Public Works (DPW), with landscaped front entrance forecourt (1953–54) and mature trees (pre-1946, pre-1955). The school has a strong and ongoing association with its surrounding community.

Originally part of the lands of the Turrbal people, non-indigenous settlement of the St Lucia area commenced in the 1850s. By 1859 the whole St Lucia-Taringa peninsula had been divided into 22 farm lots used for crop farming and cattle grazing. In 1871 a sugar mill and refinery were established in St Lucia Pocket, with local farmers supplying cane.

The establishment of schools was considered an essential step in the development of new communities and integral to their success. Locals often donated land and labour for a school's construction and the school community contributed to maintenance and development. Schools became a community focus, a symbol of progress, and a source of pride, with enduring connections formed with past pupils, parents, and teachers. The first attempts to provide schooling in the St Lucia locality were private initiatives dating from 1864.

Ironside State School opened as "Toowong Provisional School" in a temporary building on 10 October 1870, with 42 pupils enrolled. Provisional schools were introduced in 1869 for smaller communities that could guarantee a student population of 15 (later reduced to 12). Provisional schools were once very common and many state schools began as such, on the same or on a different site. These schools generally occupied temporary structures on non-government land. The Queensland Government supplied the teacher and school books but did not fund building construction.

In the same month that Toowong Provisional School opened, the Board of Education called tenders for a new timber schoolhouse and residence, designed by the architect Richard Suter. Drawings show a one-room timber school house with a porch, constructed with external studding. The Toowong Provisional School re-opened on 21 February 1871 on the site of the current Ironside State School, which had been provided by major landholder Thomas Lodge Murray-Prior. The buildings stood on cleared high ground at the southwest corner of the 0.92 hectares (2.3 acres) site, facing Swann Road, and the teachers residence stood behind (to its east). The community donated £86, with the expectation further funds would be raised to cover the £100 required by Queensland Government for establishment of the school.

With the opening of railway stations at Toowong, Taringa (originally called West Milton), and Indooroopilly (originally called Witton) in 1875, the surrounding district became more attractive for residential development. Toowong Provisional School was redesignated as Toowong State School in 1875 due to the growth in its pupil numbers and by 1879 there were 146 students enrolled. The school was renamed Indooroopilly State School in 1881, following the construction of a new Toowong State School in 1880 to meet demand in that area.

During the 1880s, farms surrounding the school were subdivided in response to Brisbane's population growth, but poor road access and no public transport made the land on the St Lucia peninsula uncompetitive and land sales were slow.

Despite owner Murray Prior's intention to donate the school's land, and his attempts to do so, the school site was sold to architect Richard Gailey in 1884, as part of Portion 24 (38 acres (15 ha)). Gailey transferred the school site, comprising 0.923 hectares (2.28 acres), to the Secretary for Public Instruction in March 1884.

The school was renamed "Indooroopilly Pocket School" in 1888 following the establishment of a new Indooroopilly State School on Moggill Road.

Brisbane's 1893 flood devastated the low-lying areas of the St Lucia peninsula, and the area remained a small semi-rural community for a further 50 years. Nevertheless, pupil numbers at the school increased enough to warrant additions to the school building in 1895. Additions and repairs to the school were also made in 1908.

To reduce confusion with Indooroopilly State School, Indooroopilly Pocket State School was renamed Ironside State School in 1905, which was the name of a neighbouring estate

In the early 20th century there was strong demand for land as the population of Brisbane grew thirty-fold. The land around Ironside State School was subdivided for residential development in the early 1920s, boosting pupil numbers.

The school grounds were extended during the 1930s to provide space for new sporting facilities. In early 1934, a number of residential land parcels to the east of the original school reserve were transferred to the Queensland Government. This land was formally gazetted as an extension to the state school reserve in June 1934, bringing the size of the school grounds to 1.51 hectares (3.7 acres).The additional land was formed into the school's playing field between 1936 and 1946. The site of the district's earlier private school (sub 3), located south of the state school was added to the school in 1937. It had been dedicated as a road (Portion 253) in 1927. The road closed in 1937 after its acquisition by the government. Land to the south of the road (Subs 894 and 895 of Portion 25) was also added.

The Great Depression, commencing in 1929 and extending well into the 1930s, caused a dramatic reduction of building work in Queensland and brought private building work to a standstill. In response, the Queensland Government provided relief work for unemployed Queenslanders and embarked on an ambitious and important building program to provide impetus to the economy.

In June 1932, the Forgan Smith Labor State Government came to power with a campaign advocating increased government spending to counter the effects of the Depression. The government embarked on a large public works building program designed to promote the employment of local skilled workers and the purchase of local building materials. The construction of substantial brick school buildings in prosperous or growing suburban areas and regional centres during the 1930s provided tangible proof of the government's commitment to remedy the unemployment situation.

Depression-era brick school buildings form a recognisable and important type. Most were designed in a classical idiom to project the sense of stability and optimism which the government sought to convey. Frequently, they were two storeys above an open undercroft and built to accommodate up to 1,000 students. They adopted a symmetrical layout and a prominent central entry. Ideally, the classrooms would face south with the verandah or corridor on the north side, but almost all brick school buildings faced the primary boundary road, regardless of orientation. Classrooms were commonly divided by folding timber partitions and the undercroft was used as covered play space, storage, ablutions and other functions.

Despite their similarities, each Depression-era brick school building was individually designed by a DPW architect, which resulted in a wide range of styles and ornamental features being utilised within the overall set. These styles, which were derived from contemporary tastes and preferences, included: Arts and Crafts, typified by half-timbered gable-ends; Spanish Mission, with round-arched openings and decorative parapets; Art Deco, with monumental entrances, stylised and stepped decoration, and strong horizontal and vertical lines; and Neo-classical, with pilasters, columns and large triangular pediments. Over time, variations occurred in building size, aesthetic treatment, and climatic-responsive features. Several of the brick schools were constructed in stages, balancing demand with the availability of resources; and some schools were never fully completed.

Ironside State School's Depression-era brick school building (Block A) was designed by Thomas Robert Gladwin, a Brisbane-born architect who had worked for the DPW from 1924 and was one of the team of architects designing interwar brick schools. The building was constructed in four stages between 1935 and 1959, in response to population growth in the suburb as well as difficulties procuring materials, including bricks, in the years immediately after World War II (WWII). The school was one of the more modest designs in the family of brick schools, although all the key features of the type were incorporated.

The first stage of construction comprised the undercroft and part of the ground floor level including the front porch, one classroom to the west of the porch and three to the east. The DPW Annual Report for 1935 noted:

"This new building is being erected on the site of the old school. The work at present under construction has four classrooms and will provide accommodation for 168 pupils. Provision has been made for ... two [additional] classrooms on the same floor ..., which will increase the accommodation to 256 pupils. Provision has also been made for the addition of a second storey containing seven classrooms which will further increase the accommodation to 552 pupils." "The building is of brick ... with a tile roof. Up to the ground level the brickwork is plastered and lined to imitate stonework and serve as a base to the face brick walls above. The section at present under construction has classrooms, teachers' rooms, cloakroom entrance porch, hall and corridors on ground floor, and advantage has been taken of a sloping site to provide an enclosed and concreted play area under [a] portion of the building; here also a separate porch and hall with concrete stairs leading to ground floor have been provided."

The original timber school was intended to remain as classroom accommodation after completion of the first stage of the 1930s school, but it was sold in 1936 and moved off-site. Block A was opened on 16 November 1935 by Frank Cooper, Minister for Public Instruction.

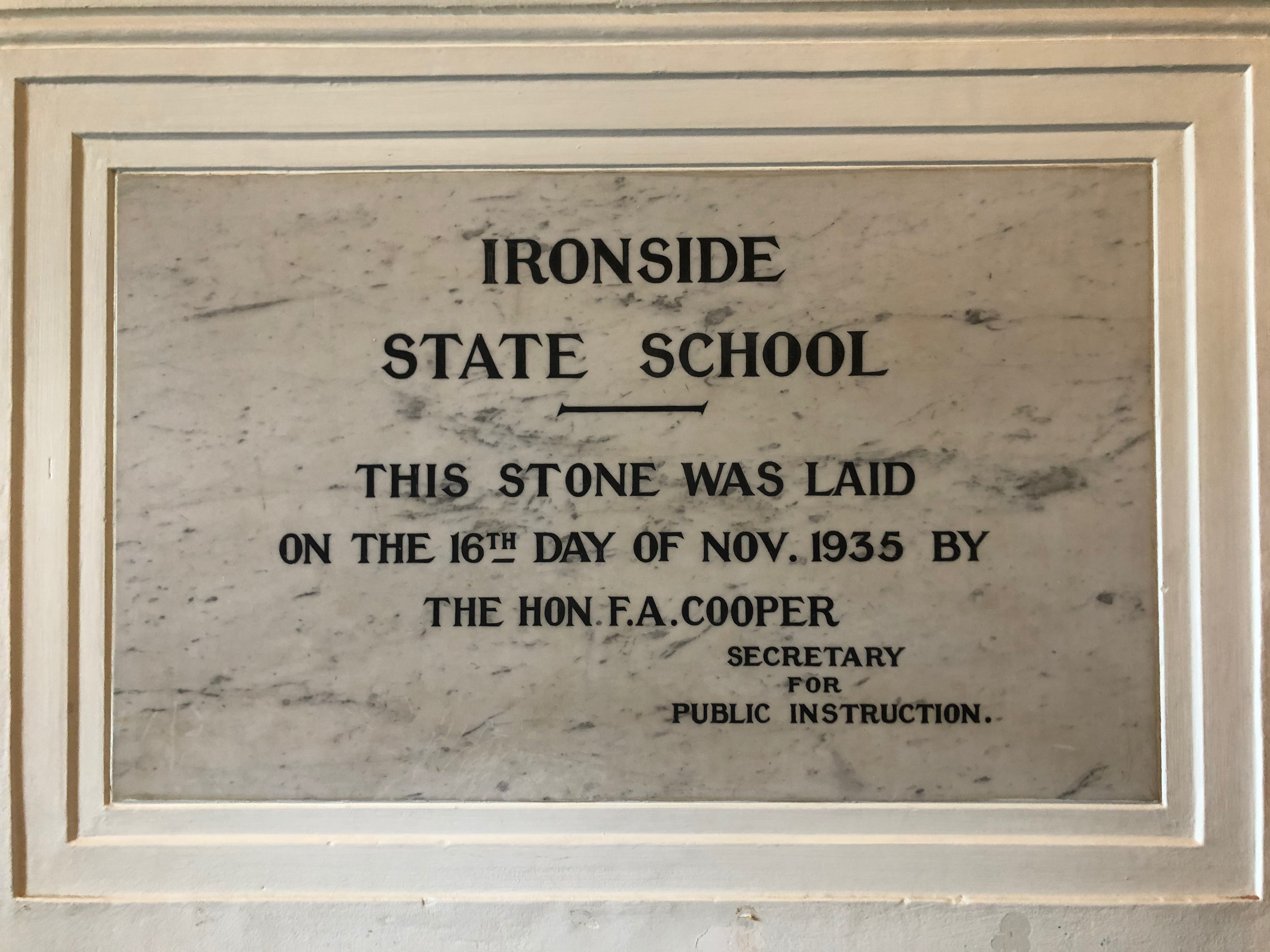
Plaque opening Ironside State School 1936

Located on high ground, facing Central Avenue, it had a standard linear plan of classrooms running east–west, symmetrically ordered either side of the central entrance hall, with a teacher's room on each side of the hall. The classrooms beyond the teachers' rooms were 21 feet (6.4 m) wide with large banks of casement windows facing south and were accessed from an 8 feet (2.4 m) verandah to the north. The four central classrooms were in pairs, each room 19 feet (5.8 m) by 19 feet 8 3/4 inches (6.01 m), and separated by folding partitions. The classrooms at the ends of the building were 19 by 24 feet (5.8 m × 7.3 m). A cloakroom and staircase projected to the north at each end of the building.

Construction was of brick and reinforced concrete, with cavity brick used on the walls exposed to the weather. Classroom floors were timber, spanning reinforced steel joists. The verandah floors, hallway floors and stairs were concrete, while the verandah balustrades on the north elevation were timber. The slope of the land accommodated a play area in the undercroft at the east end, with fixed windows and mesh screens on the south elevation. A spoon drain ran round the perimeter of the building.

Between the late 1940s and the 1960s, the Department of Public Instruction was largely unprepared for the enormous demand for state education. This was a nation-wide occurrence resulting from immigration and the unprecedented population growth now termed the "baby boom". Queensland schools were overcrowded and, to cope, many new buildings were constructed and existing buildings were extended. Ironside State School's pupil numbers rose after WWII due to these causes and the transfer of the University of Queensland to St Lucia in 1946, bringing its associated academic community.

Further post-war accommodation at Ironside State School was provided through additions to Block A and new buildings. Plans to complete the Block A building scheme were drawn in 1946. Two classrooms on the western end of the ground and first floors were completed in 1947. Two further classrooms and a narrow teacher's room were added to the central section of the first floor in 1948. When the upper floor was added, terracotta tiled hoods supported on timber brackets were installed over the windows at ground floor level. In 1955, plans for the temporary enclosure of the Block A undercroft were drawn. This included modifying the existing window sashes on the south elevation from fixed to opening. Another three classrooms were built on the eastern end of Block A, completing the first floor and the building scheme in 1959. All additions were in accordance with the original design concept. While Block A was being completed other classrooms were built to the north, however, these buildings have since been removed.

An important component of Queensland state schools was their grounds. Trees and gardens were planted to shade and beautify schools. Aesthetically-designed gardens were encouraged by regional inspectors, and educators believed gardening and Arbor Days, which were celebrated in Queensland from 1890, instilled in young minds the value of hard work and activity, improved classroom discipline, developed aesthetic tastes, and inspired people to stay on the land. The early and continuing commitment to play-based education, particularly in primary schools, resulted in the provision of outdoor play space and sporting facilities, such as playing fields and tennis courts.

Development of the grounds of Ironside State School followed the construction of Block A and the addition of land to the site. These works were primarily funded by the School Committee and later by the school's Parents and Citizen's Association (P&C); with subsidies from the Queensland Government.

Between 1936 and 1946, a playing field was formed on the land added to the site in 1934. In July 1939 labourers employed under a job-creation scheme were working on the school grounds. In June 1940 a tennis court was opened on the western boundary, followed by a second tennis court to its north in 1951–52. A basketball court was constructed in 1956 southeast of Block A and in 1958 the swimming pool was opened on the southeast corner of the site.

Plans were drawn in October 1952 for landscaping of the site. The tree located southeast of Block A (Eucalyptus sp) in 2018, which appears in aerials of the site from 1946, was noted on this plan. A tender for the construction of porphyry walls, concrete steps and paths, brick walling, decomposed granite paving, wire fencing and a driveway was advertised in 1953. This work, which included the current entrance driveway, and a brick retaining wall with garden bed that ran from southeast to northeast around Block A, was completed in 1954. Re-erection of the existing flagpole on a new concrete base occurred at this time. The current brick gateposts were in-situ by 1955. A bitumen assembly area to the south of Block A was formed in the second half of the 1950s, but no longer exists. In 2018, a section of brick retaining wall and garden bed southeast of Block A, the flagpole, driveway and brick gateposts are extant.

Alterations to Block A have been made since its construction. In 1985 the play area in the undercroft was altered. In 1996 the upper floor verandah was enclosed. Doors from the landings at each end were upgraded for fire, and windows onto the landings were filled with glass blocks. Sunscreens were fixed on the north elevation under the eaves to shade the windows enclosing the verandah. The undercroft was upgraded for an office, practice room and rehearsal room, including enclosing the north wall with louvres, removing internal timber partitions, casting new concrete floor slabs and altering doors and installing a new ceiling for fire protection.

Apart from Block A, all the current school buildings date from 1960 onwards. These include E Block north wing (1962), B Block Centenary Library (1970), additional pool change rooms and toilets (1973), F Block new library (1985), E Block south wing (1986), G block (1992), H Block Hall (1997), D Block Prep building (2005), J Block (2010), K Block (2012), M Block (c. 2016-7) and L Block replacing C Block (2017).

Throughout its history, Ironside State School has had a close association with the St Lucia and district community. Between the 1930s and 1950s, fancy dress balls and fetes were popular fundraisers, mainly for improvements to the school grounds. In later years, the P&C conducted fetes, dinners, and free dress days as fundraisers. The school's anniversaries have been marked with a diamond jubilee celebration and a published school history in 1930; a centenary history in 1970; and a further history publication in conjunction with celebrations for the 125th anniversary in 1995. On 10 October 2020, a celebration day was held at the school grounds for students, teachers and some guests, to celebrate the 150th anniversary of the school. During this day the time capsule of 1988 was opened, and the school was presented with the Ironside State School Sesquicentenary 1870 to 2020 book, filled with memories and stories of former students.

In 2018, the school continues to operate from its original site. It retains its Depression-era brick school building (1935–59), with landscaped front entrance forecourt (1953–4) and mature Eucalyptus trees (pre-1946, 1950s). Ironside State School is important to St Lucia as a key social focus for the community. Generations of students have been taught there and many community events held in the school's grounds and buildings since its establishment.

== Description ==
Ironside State School stands on an approximately triangular 1.8 hectares (4.4 acres) site in St Lucia, 4.5 kilometres (2.8 mi) southwest of Brisbane CBD. The site is bounded by Swann Road / Hawken Drive, the main thoroughfare of the area, which runs along the southwest (front) of the school. Central Avenue and Ironside Street are to the east and north, with a short boundary to residential properties on the northwest.

The school buildings form a complex on the centre and highest part of the site around a landscaped central courtyard. The front building is a substantial Depression-era brick school building (Block A). It is the most prominent and impressive building on the site and can be viewed from many points in the surrounding neighbourhood.

=== Block A (1935-59) ===
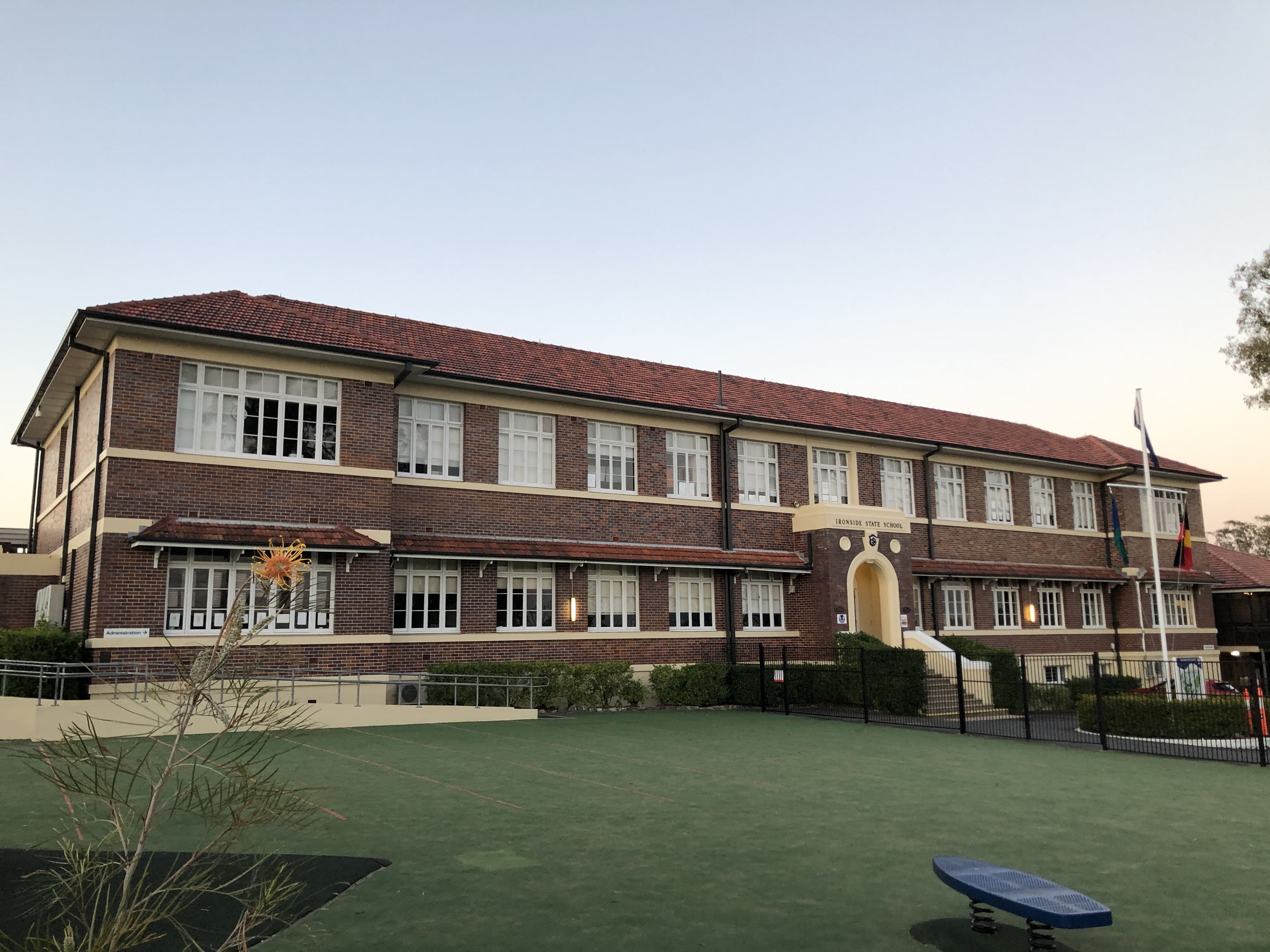
School, 2020

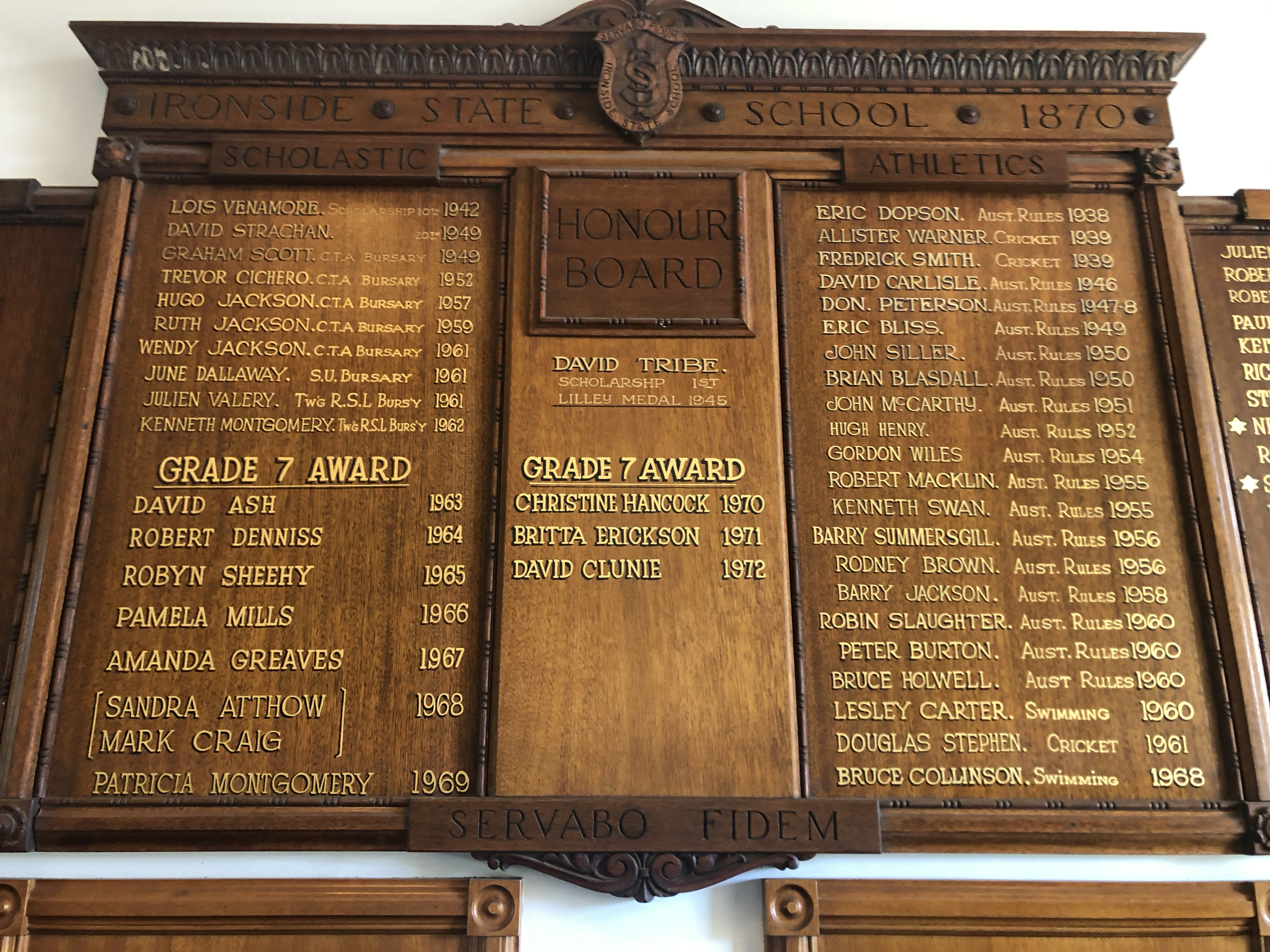
Honour Board of Ironside State School, main panel

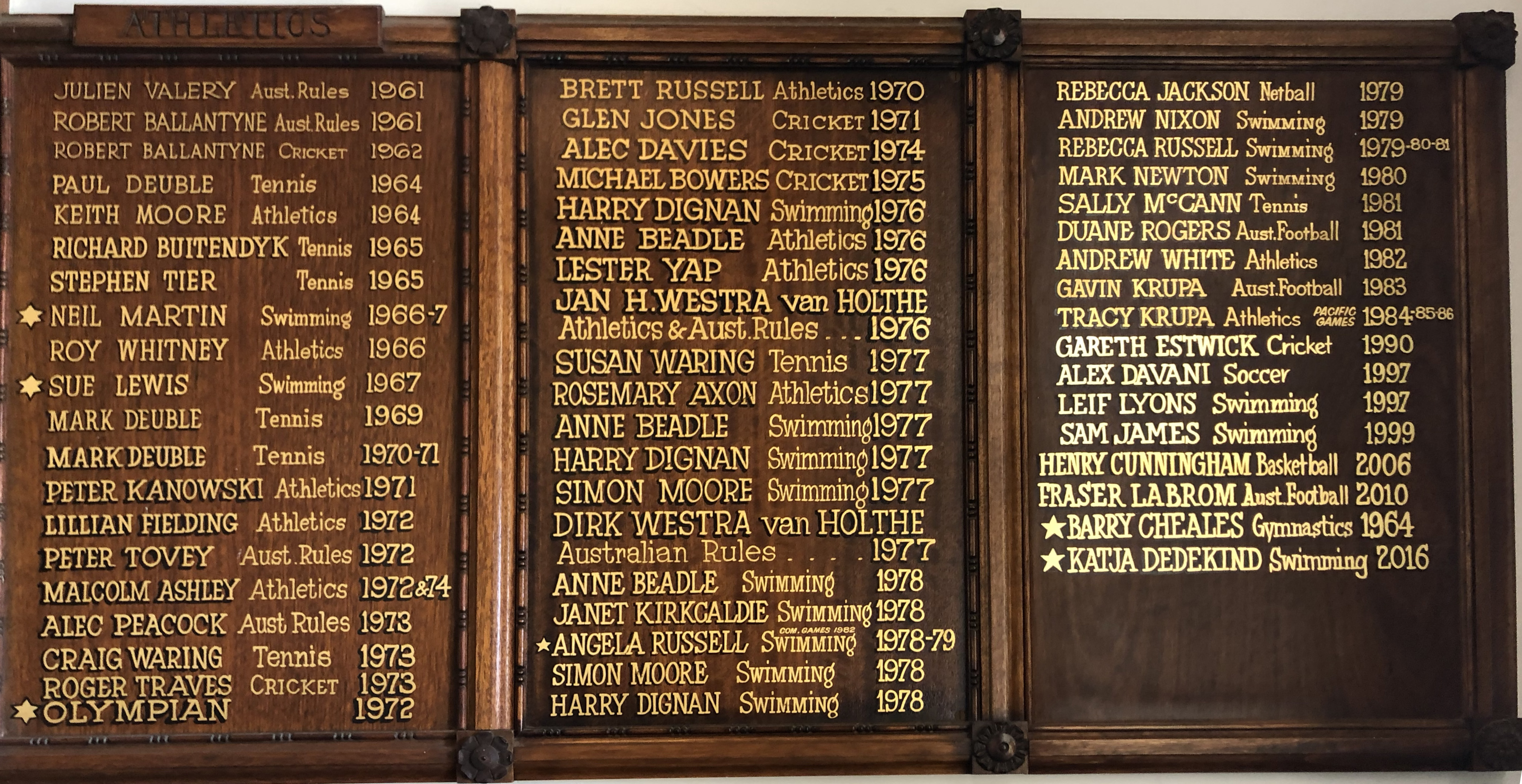
Honour Board of Ironside State School, right panel

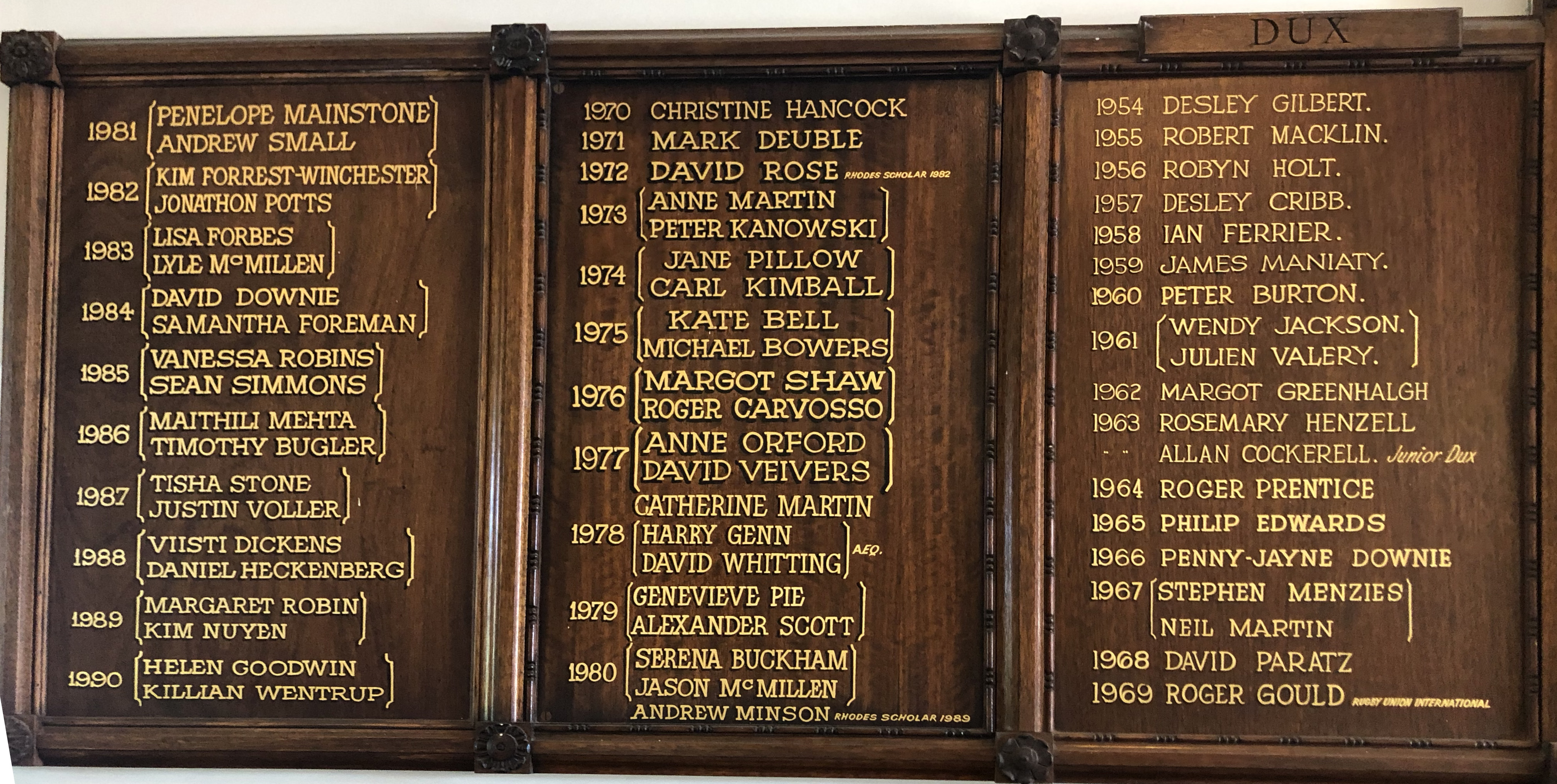
Honour Board of Ironside State School, left panel

Block A is a long, H-shaped face brick building with painted concrete dressings and a multi-hipped roof clad with tiles. Its long sides face approximately north and south and it is symmetrical around a central entrance. It has a generous open space around the building on all sides to allow unimpeded natural light and ventilation to all interior rooms. It has two storeys of classrooms with an undercroft at the east end of the building. The undercroft walls are finished in stucco, scored to mimic ashlar coursing. Originally partially open, it has been fully enclosed to accommodate classrooms. The staged construction of the building in different periods is legible with slight variations in the brick pointing.

The front (south) elevation features regular banks of timber-framed casement windows on both classroom levels. A short wide stair leads from the driveway to the main entrance, which is a projecting porch with an arched front doorway featuring the school crest and raised lettering "IRONSIDE STATE SCHOOL" in stucco. A similar entrance is on the west side of the building but that on the east side has been replaced.

The layout of the classroom levels comprises a series of classrooms on the southern side accessed by a long verandah on the north, terminating at a stairwell at either end of the building. The interior walls are plaster with beading at dado height. Classrooms have timber floors and the verandah floors and stairs are concrete, coved up to the walls. On the first floor, parts of the wall between classrooms and verandah have been demolished as have some partitions between classrooms, including timber folding partitions; however, cover strips and bulkheads indicate their location. Later partitions have been inserted on all levels.

=== Front Entrance Forecourt ===
The open play area and vehicle driveway in front (south) of Block A forms an open forecourt to the building and an impressive setting to the elegant and formal architecture of Block A. This open space allows views to Block A from the main thoroughfare of Hawken Drive and Swann Road.

== Heritage listing ==
Ironside State School was listed on the Queensland Heritage Register on 27 July 2018 having satisfied the following criteria.

The place is important in demonstrating the evolution or pattern of Queensland's history.

Ironside State School (established as Toowong Provisional School in 1870) is important in demonstrating the evolution of state education and its associated architecture in Queensland. The school retains an excellent, representative example of a Department of Public Works (DPW)-designed Depression-era brick school building, which was an architectural response to prevailing government educational philosophies during the interwar Depression; set in landscaped grounds with provision of assembly areas, sporting facilities and mature trees.

The Depression-era brick school building (1935–59) is the result of the State Government's building and relief work programmes during the 1930s that stimulated the economy and provided work for men unemployed as a result of the Great Depression. Its completion in stages between 1947 and 1959 was in response to enormous population growth in the post-war years.

The suburban site with mature trees, sporting facilities, and other landscaping features including front entrance forecourt with terracing, flagpole, entrance gates and gateposts demonstrates the importance of play and aesthetics in the education of children.

The place is important in demonstrating the principal characteristics of a particular class of cultural places.

Ironside State School is important in demonstrating the principal characteristics of a Queensland state school built during the Depression-era. These include: a large, intact, brick school building, set within a landscaped site with mature shade trees, assembly and play areas, and sporting facilities.

The substantial Depression-era brick school building is a good example of its type and retains a high degree of integrity. It demonstrates the principal characteristics of Depression-era Brick Schools, including: its symmetrically arranged two-storey form, with an undercroft; high-quality design with ornamental features; face brick exterior; terracotta-tiled roof; and projecting central entrance bay. The building has a linear layout, with rooms accessed via verandahs.

The place is important because of its aesthetic significance.

Through its elegant composition of formal and decorative elements, substantial size and face brick exterior, the Depression-era brick school building at Ironside State School has aesthetic significance due to its expressive attributes, by which the DPW sought to convey the concepts of progress and permanence.

The Depression-era brick school building is also significant for its streetscape contribution. Standing in a prominent location, with views to the building from Swann Road and Hawken Drive, it is an attractive and highly visible feature of the area.

The place has a strong or special association with a particular community or cultural group for social, cultural or spiritual reasons.

Schools have always played an important part in Queensland communities. They typically retain significant and enduring connections with former pupils, parents, and teachers; provide a venue for social interaction and volunteer work; and are a source of pride, symbolising local progress and aspirations.

Ironside State School has a strong and ongoing association with the St Lucia community. It was established in 1870 through the fundraising efforts of the local community and generations of children have been taught there. The place is important for its contribution to the educational development of St Lucia and is a prominent community focal point and gathering place for social and commemorative events with widespread community support.
