= Bus upgrade zone =

Feature of Brisbane's public transport system

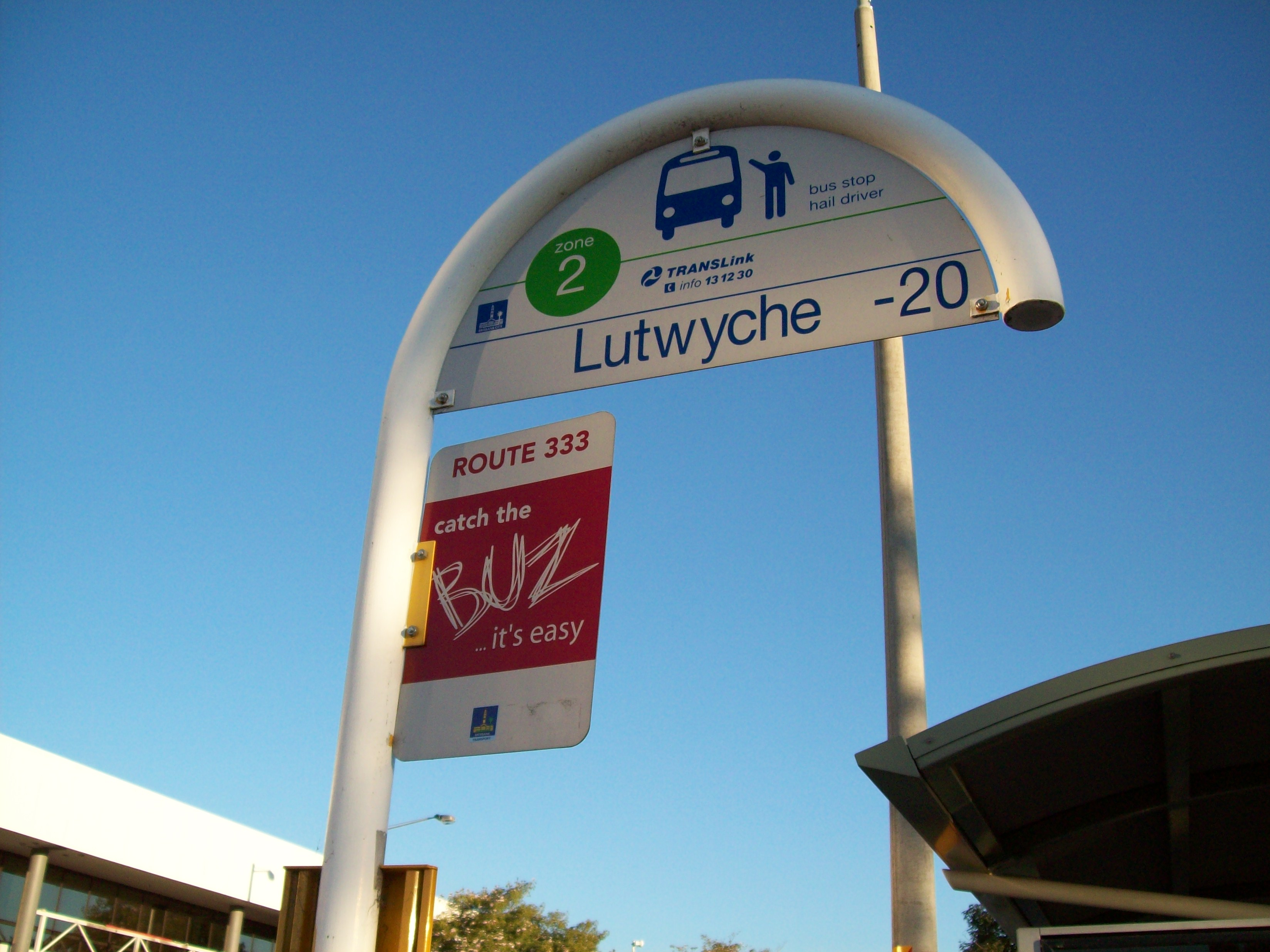
Stops serviced by BUZ routes are often identified with the above sign

Bus upgrade zones, commonly abbreviated to BUZ, are a feature of Brisbane's public transport system. The name is given to high-frequency bus routes operated by Transport for Brisbane, the Brisbane City Council agency that operates the city's public bus services for Translink. All BUZ services run at least every fifteen minutes from around 6:00am to 11:30pm seven days a week and at least every ten minutes during peak hours from Monday to Friday. Prior to the June 2025 Brisbane New Bus Network, the Cultural Centre busway station on the South East Busway was the common interchange point for all BUZ services, with the exception of routes 340 and 412. After the 2025 network changes aimed at easing congestion on the Victoria Bridge, the 385, 330 and 345 BUZ services were truncated to Queen Street bus station.

Nearly all BUZ routes are express which provide quick and frequent access to places along major trunk roads. However, routes 196 and 199 are an exception, in that they are all-stop services between the inner suburbs of Fairfield, West End, New Farm and Teneriffe. Nearly all BUZ routes are radial travelling to or from Brisbane CBD. However, routes 196 and 199 are again an exception, in that they are cross-town services that pass the CBD.

== History ==
In 2003, route 111 was upgraded to become the first BUZ service. Other BUZ services have been progressively added since.

In 2007, BUZ services carried over 346,000 passengers a week, accounting for around 30% of all Brisbane Transport patronage. Route 199 was the busiest BUZ service, carrying over 53,000 passengers per week.

In 2025, route 111 was replaced by Brisbane Metro route M1. The route remained the same.

== Routes ==
BUZ:

Route	Destinations	Type	Upgrade Date
100	Forest Lake via Woolloongabba busway station, PA Hospital, Ipswich Road, Oxley and Inala	Cityxpress	31 October 2011
120	Garden City bus station via Tarragindi, QEII Hospital and Griffith University Nathan Campus	Cityxpress	6 June 2011
130	Parkinson via Mains Rd, Sunnybank and Algester	Cityxpress	27 January 2004
140	Browns Plains bus station via Mains Rd, Sunnybank and Beaudesert Rd	Cityxpress	23 February 2009
150	Browns Plains bus station via Runcorn and Stretton (Gowan Rd and Warrigal Rd)	Cityxpress	8 November 2004
180	Garden City bus station via Greenslopes and Mansfield	Cityxpress	31 October 2011
196	Fairfield, Highgate Hill, South Brisbane, Fortitude Valley, Merthyr	All stops	6 June 2011
199	West End ferry wharf, South Brisbane, Fortitude Valley, New Farm, Teneriffe ferry wharf	All stops	20 February 2006
200	Carindale Heights via Woolloongabba busway station, Old Cleveland Road (stopping only at Coorparoo, Carina and Camp Hill) and Carindale Interchange	Cityxpress	18 February 2006
222	Carindale via Eastern Busway and Old Cleveland Road (stopping only at Coorparoo, Kismet Street, Carina and Camp Hill)	Busway service	27 August 2011
330	Bracken Ridge via Roma Street, RBWH, Northern Busway, Chermside, Zillmere and Taigum (no stops between RBWH and Chermside, Airport Link Tunnel Express)	Cityxpress	18 June 2012
333	Chermside bus station via Roma Street, RBWH, Northern Busway, Lutwyche and Kedron	Busway service	27 August 2011
340	Carseldine via Roma Street, RBWH, Northern Busway, Lutwyche, Kedron, Chermside and Aspley	Cityxpress	18 June 2012
345	Aspley via Roma Street, Kelvin Grove, Newmarket, Stafford and Maundrell Tce	Cityxpress	20 February 2006
385	The Gap via Waterworks Rd, Bardon, Paddington and Roma Street	Cityxpress	20 February 2006
412	University of Queensland bus station via Toowong	Cityxpress	23 October 2006
444	Moggill via Toowong, Indooroopilly and Kenmore	Cityxpress	23 October 2006

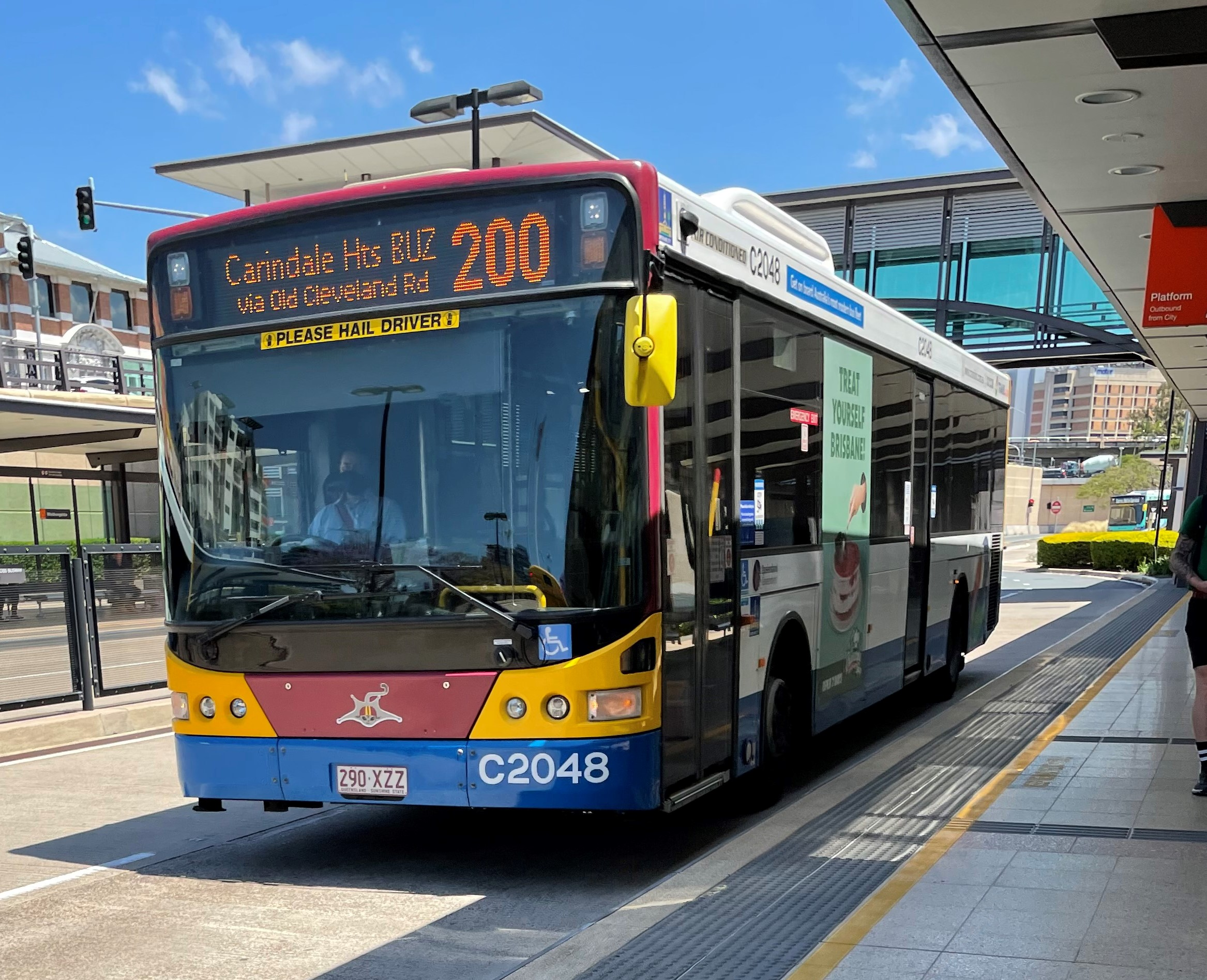
Brisbane bus C2048 working BUZ route 200 to Carindale Heights

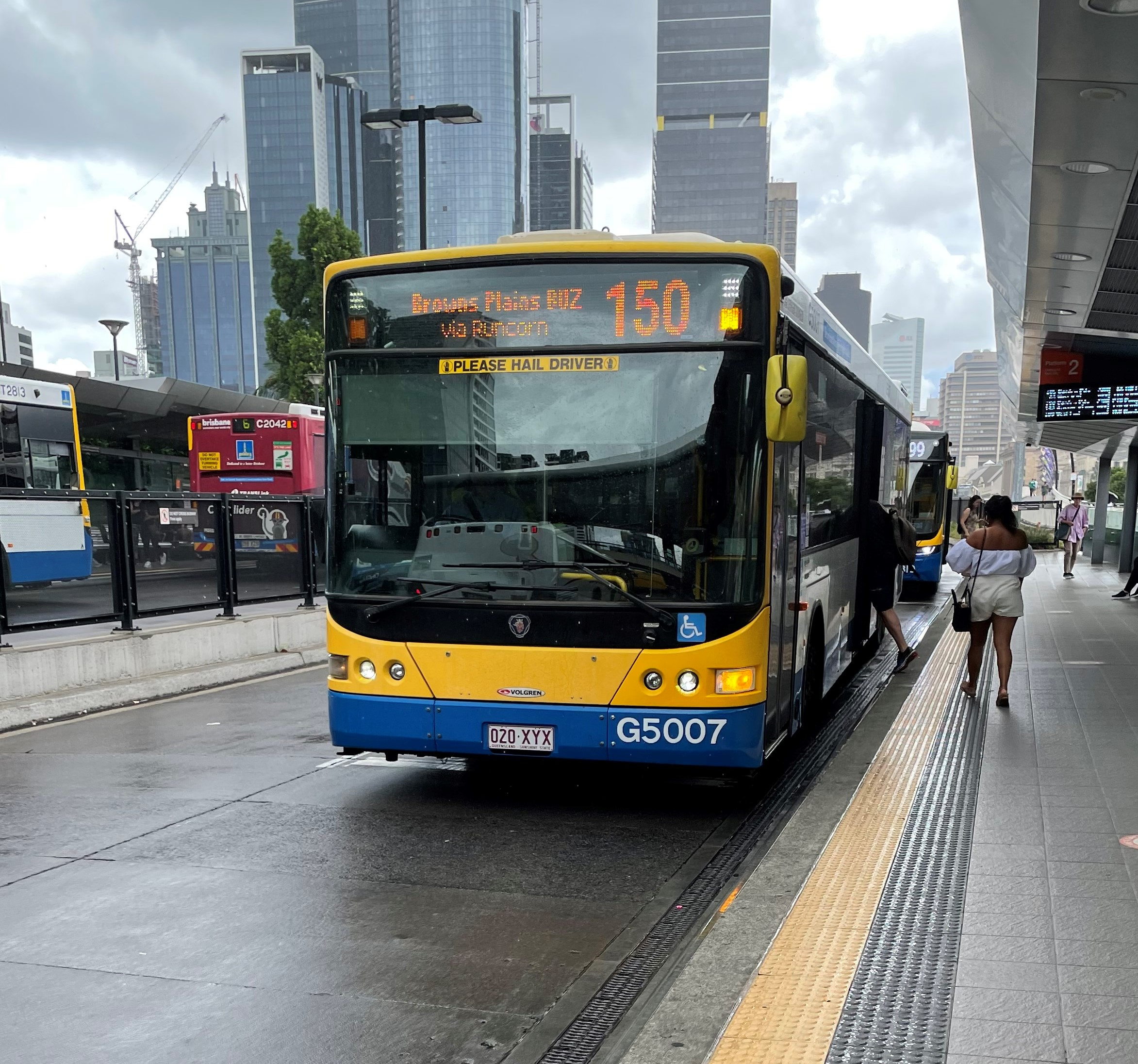
Brisbane bus G5007 working BUZ route 150 to Browns Plains

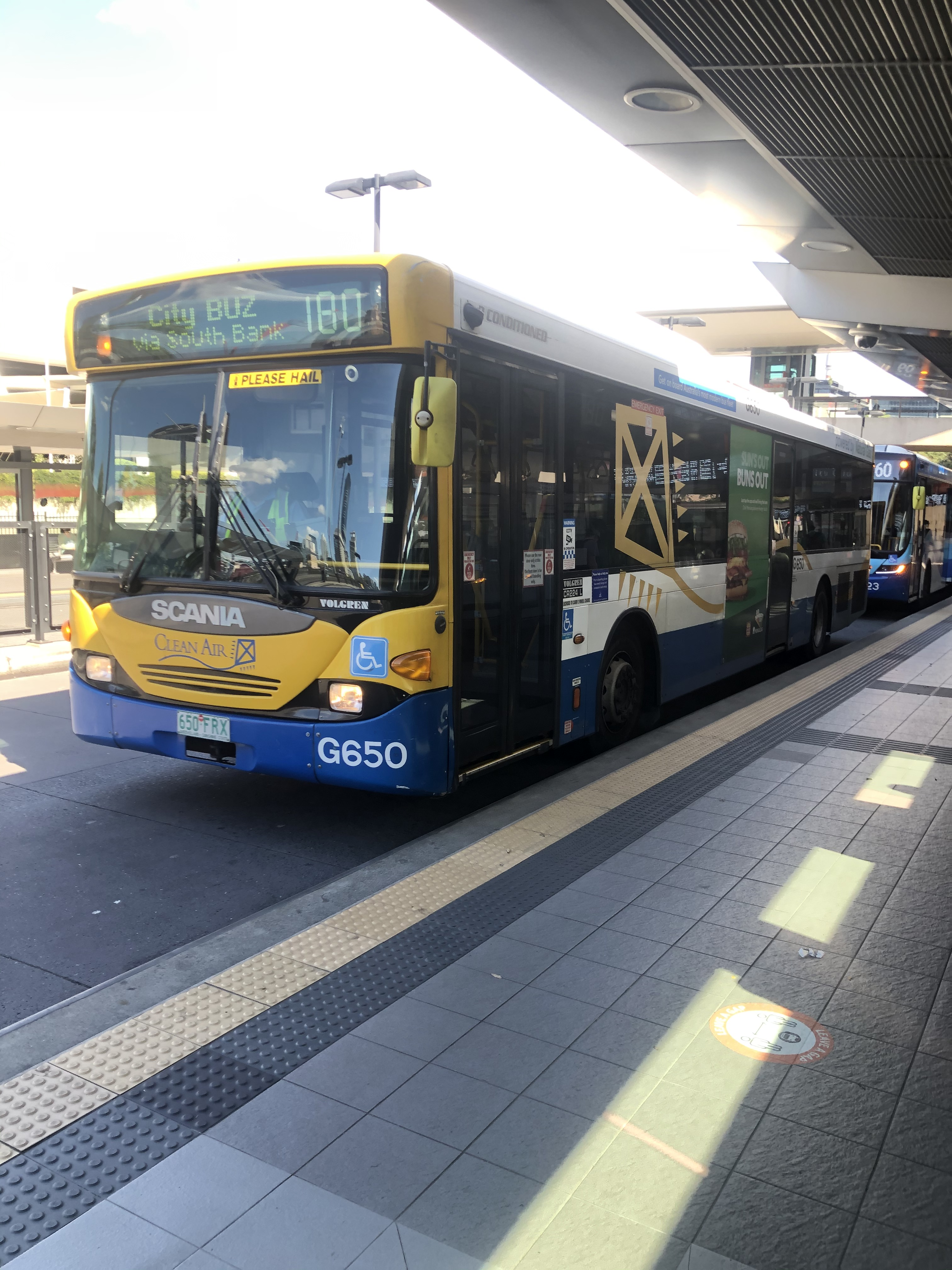
Brisbane bus G650 working BUZ route 180 to Garden City

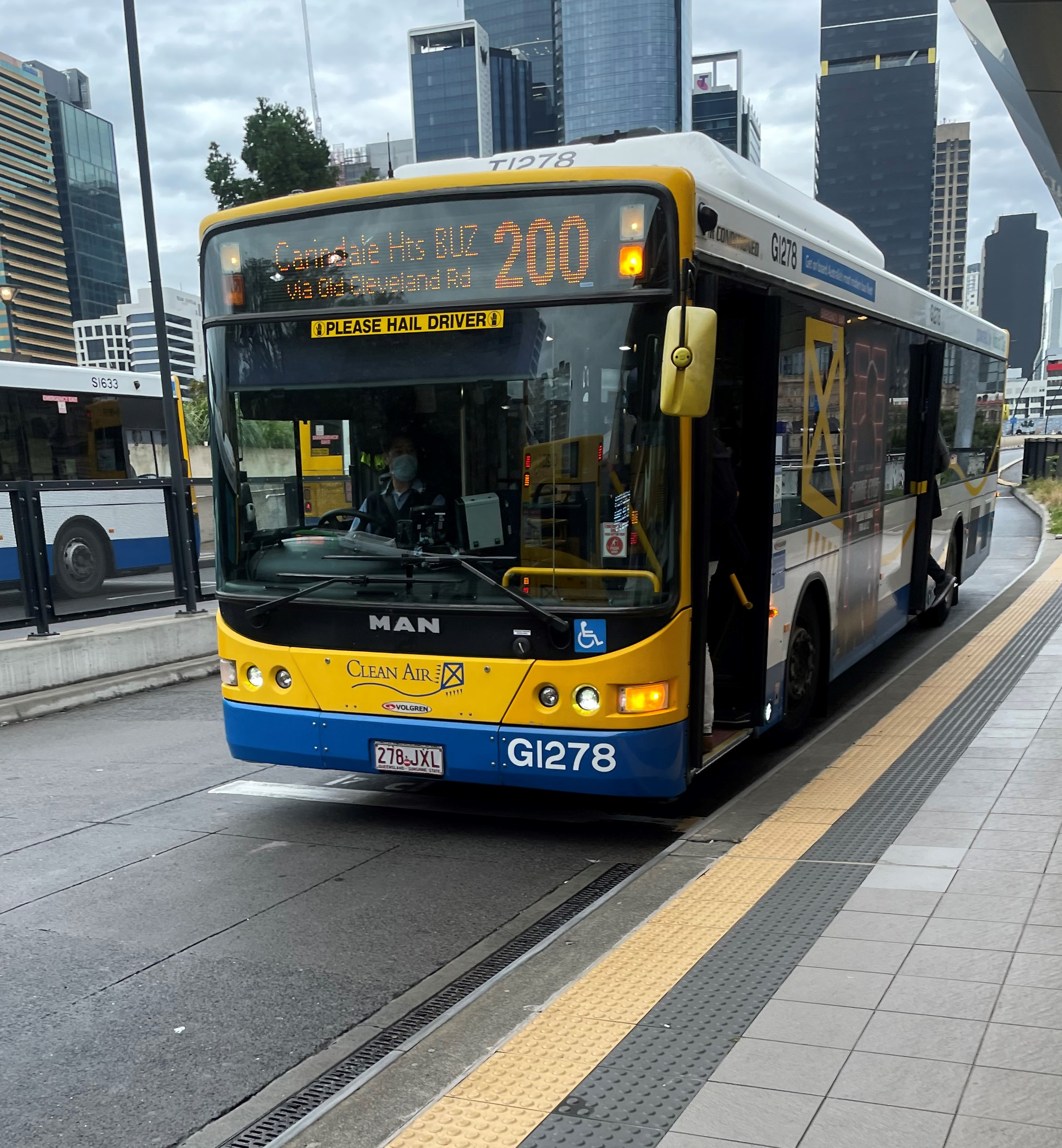
Brisbane bus G1278 working BUZ route 200 to Carindale Heights

== See also ==
- Brisbane Metro
- CityGlider
- Transport for Brisbane
- Busways in Brisbane
- Translink
