= Toowong Village =

Shopping centre and office tower in Brisbane, Australia

Coordinates: 27°29′07″S 152°59′33″E

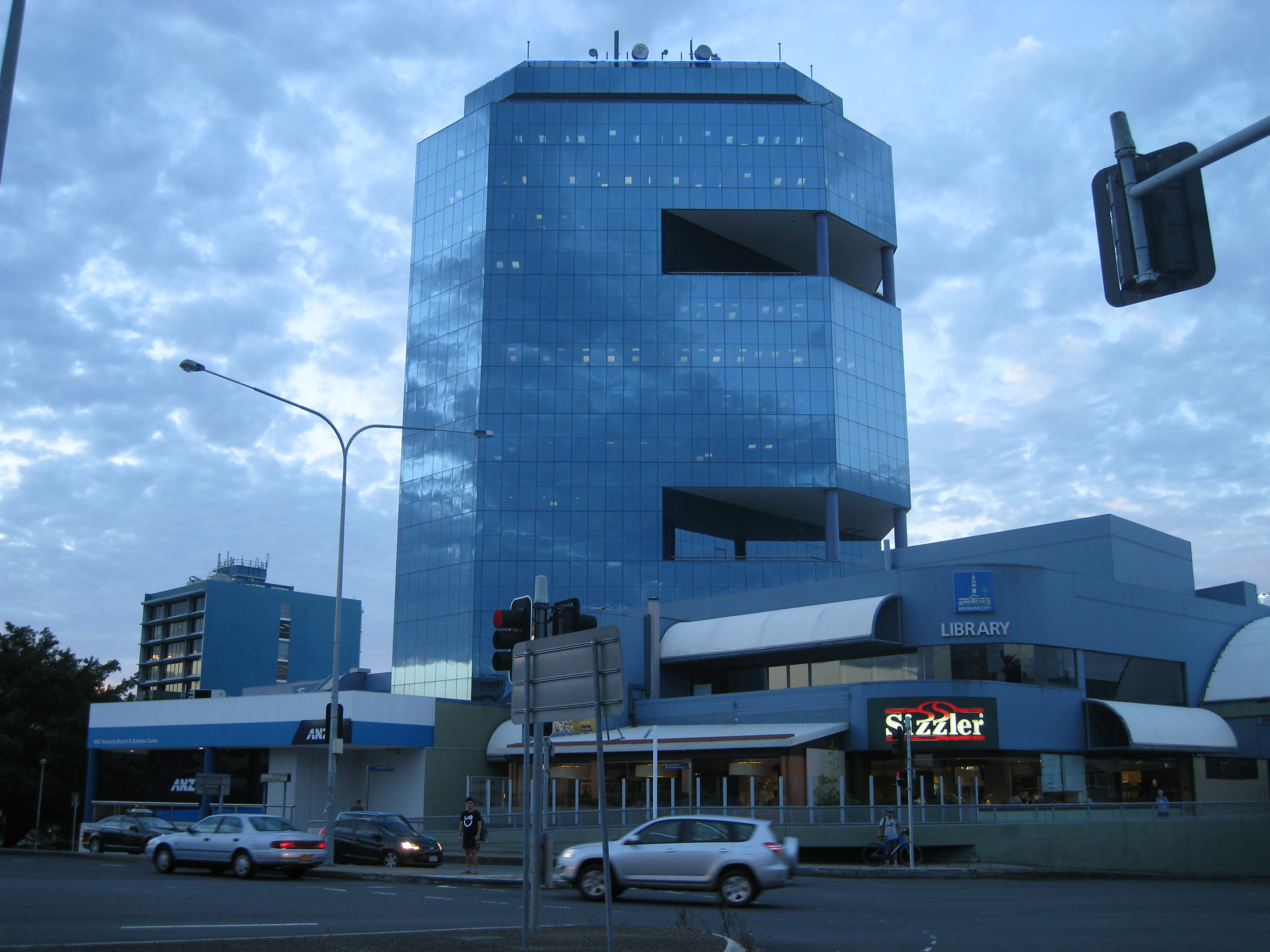
Toowong Village, from the corner of High Street and Benson Street, 2013

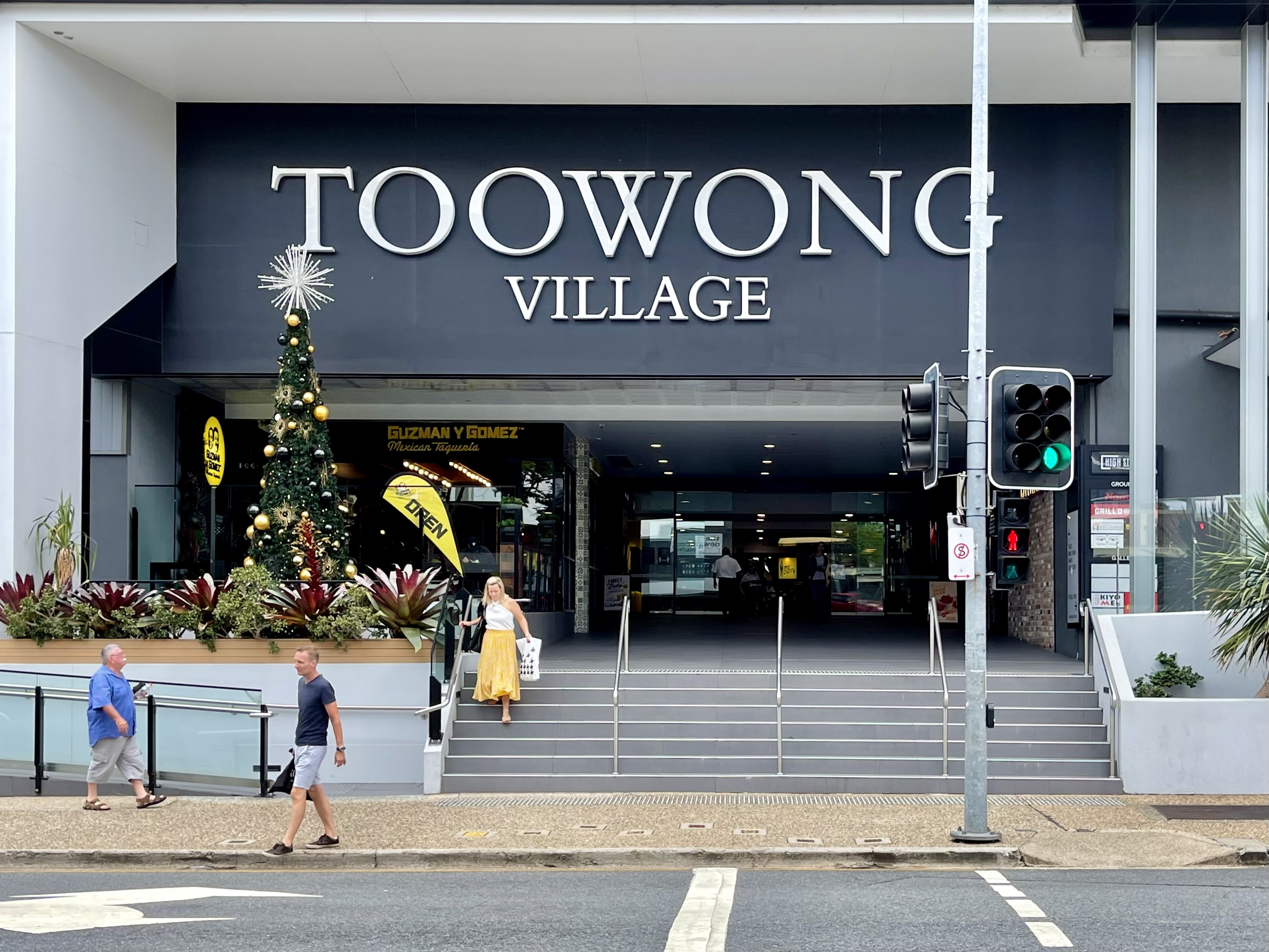
Entrance to Toowong Village from Sherwood Road, 2020

Toowong Village is a highrise building situated at the centre of the suburb of Toowong in Brisbane, Queensland, Australia, on the block of land bounded by Coronation Drive, High Street and Sherwood Road. The blue glass office tower is a prominent landmark visible from Toowong and surrounding suburbs, but is regarded by some as an eyesore.

== History ==
Opened on 11 October 1986 by Don Lane, Toowong Village is an office tower and shopping centre. The complex was built on the site of the former Patterson's sawmill and as an air rights development over Toowong railway station.

There was some controversy over its development as the Queensland Government overrode the Brisbane City Council's town plan to permit its construction. The Brisbane City Council had refused to permit its construction because of concerns about traffic congestion in surrounding streets and it has subsequently been described as a "permanent traffic bottle neck between Moggill Road and Coronation Drive.

It was developed by a joint venture of Girvan Corporation, AGC and Queensland Rail. In January 1989 it was sold to Advance Asset Management.

At its opening, Toowong Village featured 100 retailers including anchor tenants David Jones and Coles New World. The atrium was styled with ornate gilt finishes and pastel colours typical of the 1980s.

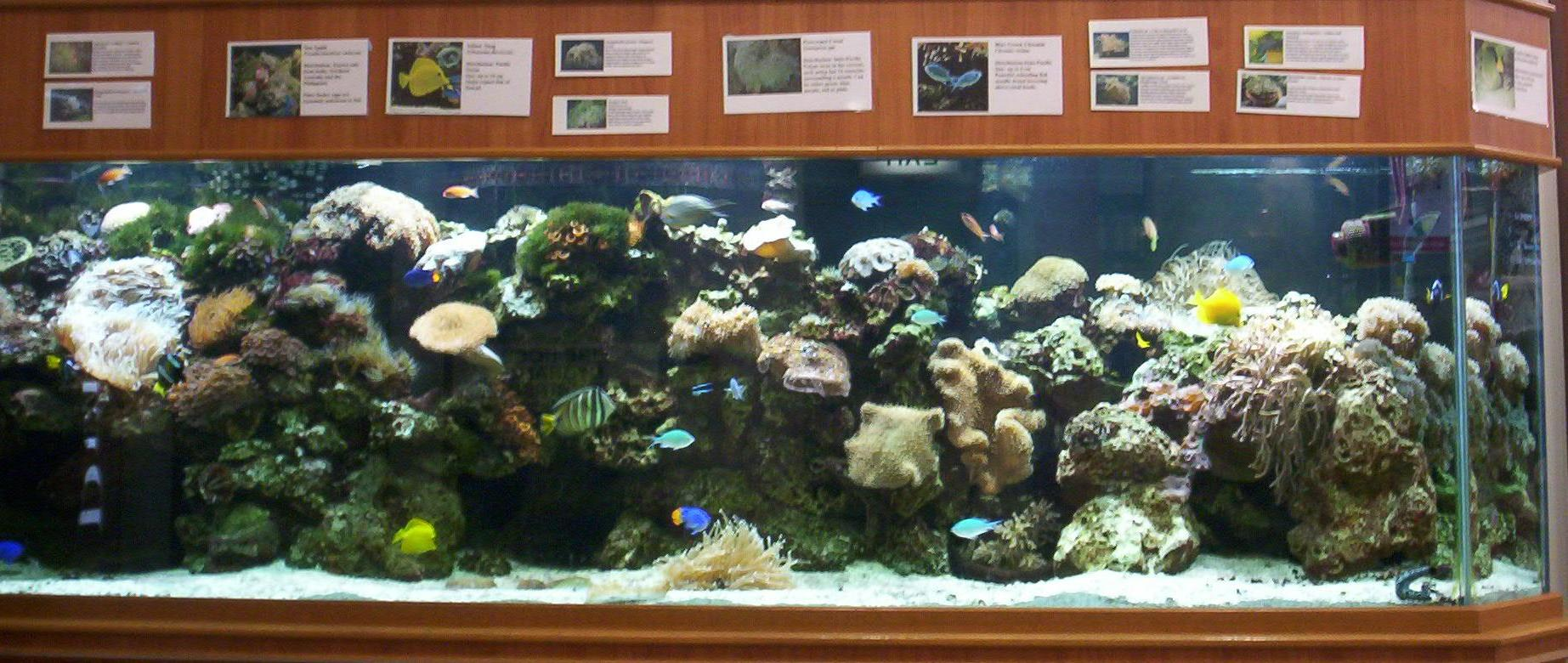
Aquarium, 2007

In October 2003, a 3.6-metre (12 ft) long coral reef aquarium was installed featuring coral and tropical fish.

A $50 million redevelopment which considerably modernised the centre was completed in 2015.

In 2021, David Jones departed as an anchor tenant of the centre. Following the departure the centre underwent a range of redevelopment works, with a number of new retailers opening in late 2022, including Woolworths and TK Maxx as new anchor tenants.

== Facilities ==
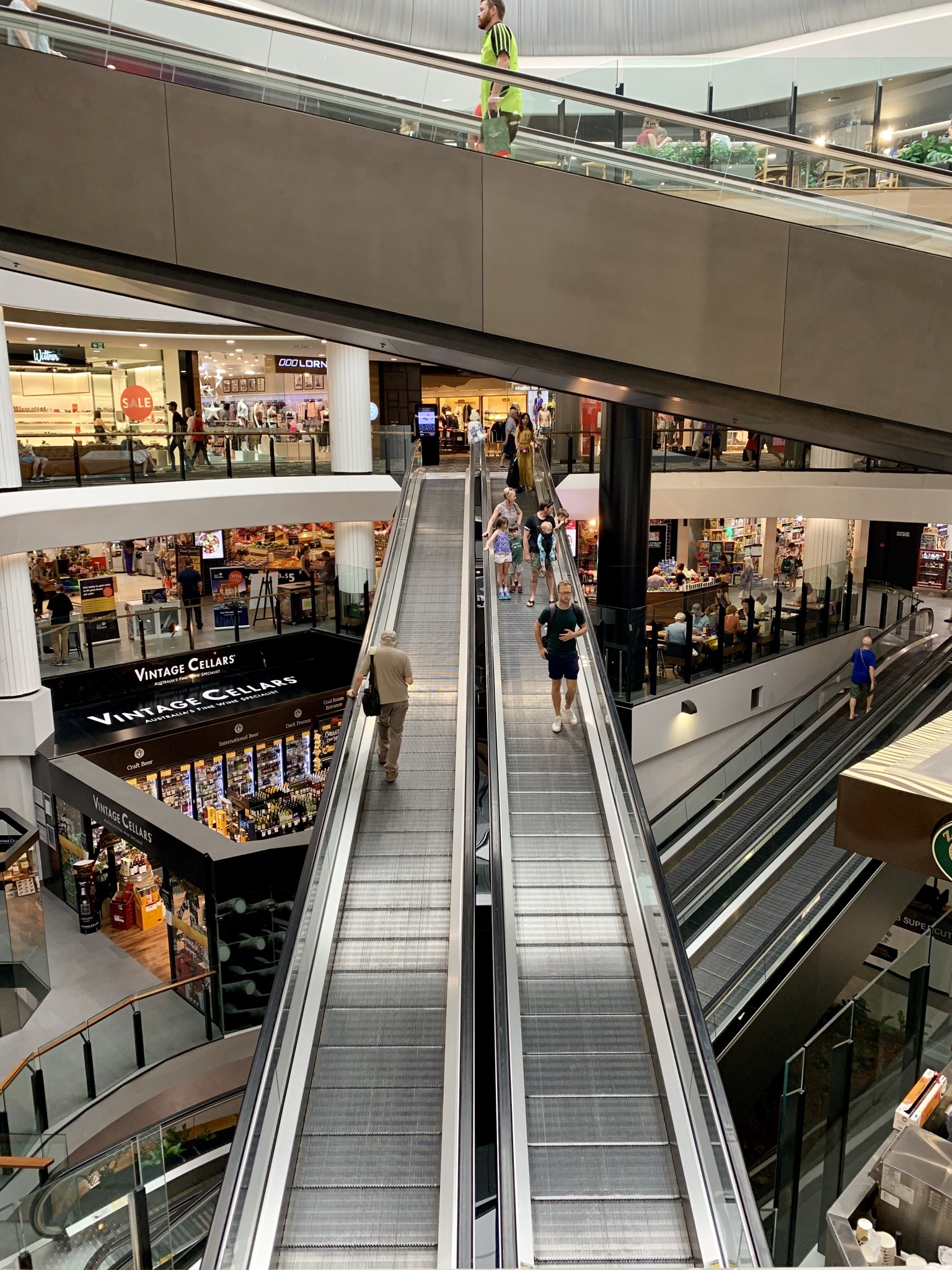
Travelators in the atrium of Toowong Village Shopping Centre.

The shopping centre is located on the lower floors of the office tower, and includes the Toowong branch of the Brisbane City Library, photocopying facilities and medical centre. The shopping centre includes 86 specialty stores over an area of approximately 31,000 square metres.

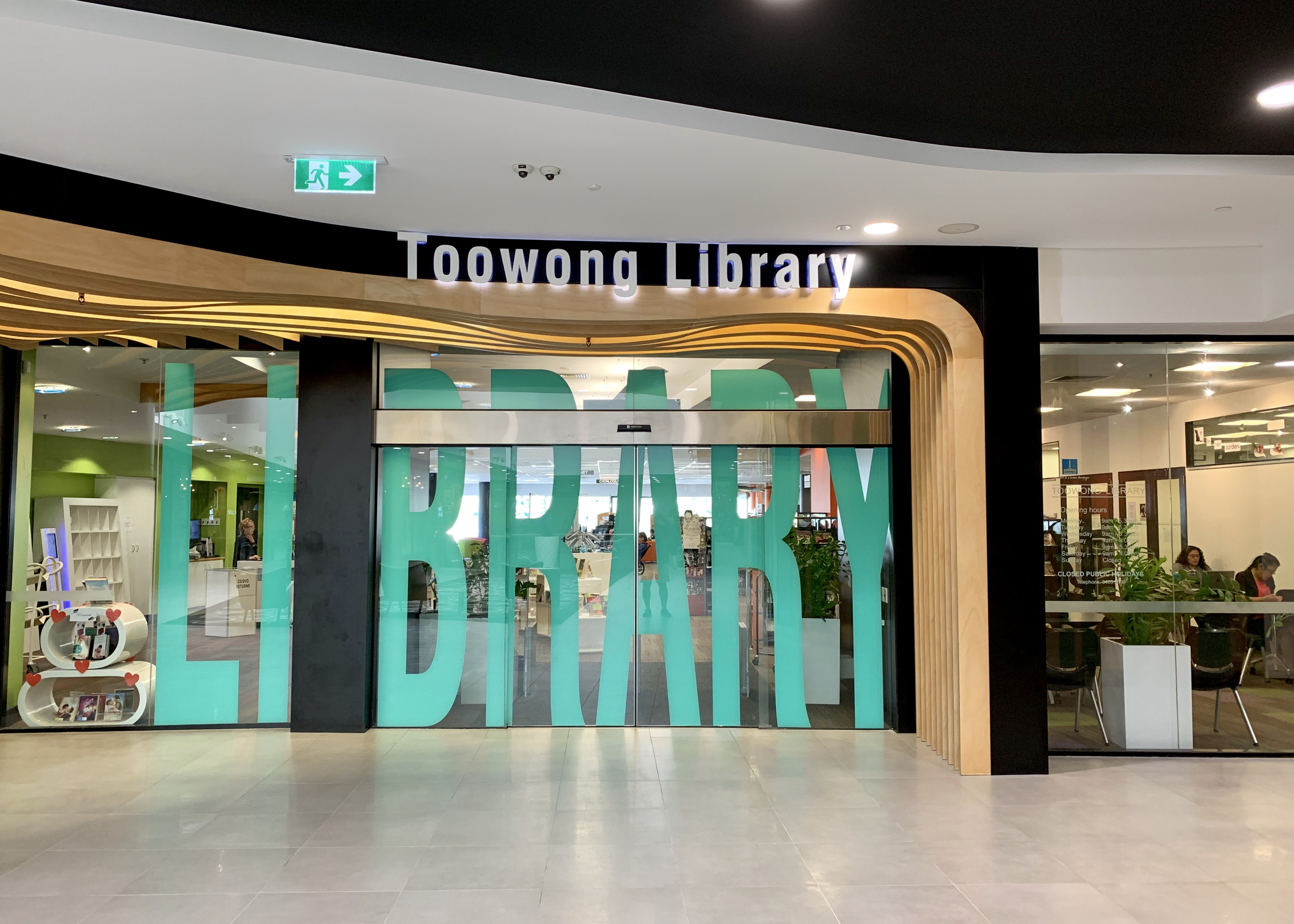
Toowong Library at Toowong Village, 2017

There is a lift and some travelators (a cross between a slanting moving walkway and an escalator) within the centre of Toowong Village. The travelators allow patrons to take shopping trolleys down, or up, to other floors of the building, without requiring to use the lift.

Toowong railway station is located beneath the building. The entry to the station is from the Gallery level of Toowong Village.

Toowong Village is open to the public seven days a week.

== Major retailers ==
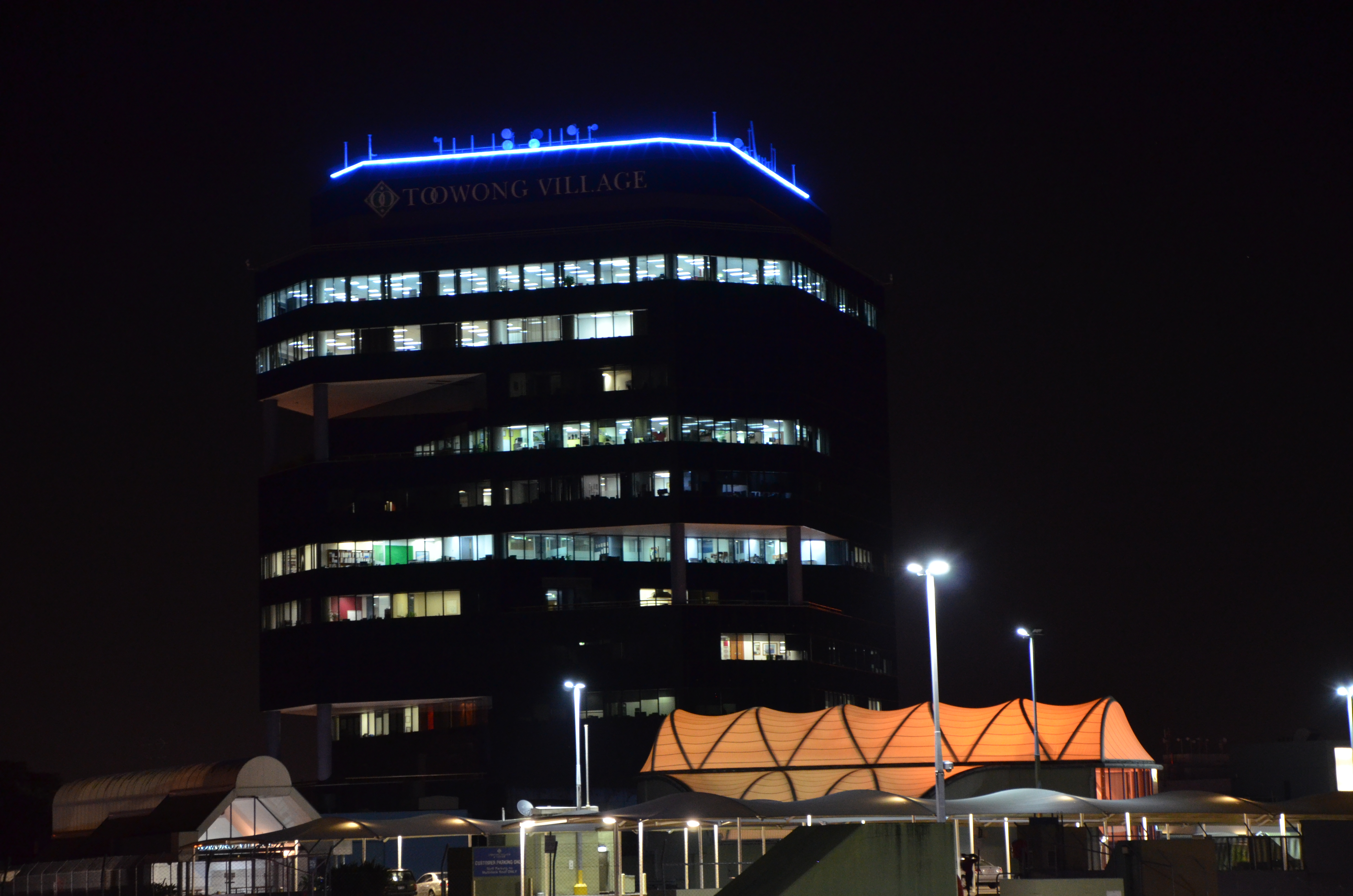
Toowong Village at night

- Coles (supermarket)
- Kmart (discount department store)
- TK Maxx (discount department store)
- Woolworths (supermarket)

== Restaurants ==
- Grill'd
- Guzman y Gomez
- Nandos
