= NightLink =

NightLink is the name given to the all-night Translink services that leave Fortitude Valley, Brisbane City and Surfers Paradise on the Gold Coast late Friday and Saturday nights.

== History ==
NightLink services started as a six-month trial in December 2005. In the first weekend, the service was so popular that Translink had to put on extra buses to meet demand. In its first year of operation, close to 200,000 passenger trips were made on NightLink services. Originally rail services ran on all lines in greater Brisbane; those with low patronage were discontinued in August 2006 and replaced with buses.

As of 14 October 2022, NightLink services no longer service Brunswick St, due to safety reasons.

== Routes ==
These services help passengers get home safely after a night out. As they depart the CBD after 9:30pm, passengers can be dropped off anywhere along the route where it is safe to do so. There are now 17 NightLink bus routes and three NightLink train routes in operation.

=== Buses ===
NightLink bus routes run every hour from 1am to 5am and are prefixed by the letter "N". Most NightLink routes mirror the equivalent 'normal' service, although slight variations apply on some routes to maximise coverage.

=== Trains ===
NightLink trains run on the Beenleigh, Caboolture and Ipswich lines with a single service around 4am.

=== FlatFare Taxis ===
The NightLink brand also includes special "FlatFare" taxi services operating on Friday and Saturday nights. The NightLink FlatFare taxis operate from designated taxi ranks and pick up multiple passengers travelling in the same general direction.

In Greater Brisbane, the taxis can travel as far as Narangba in the north, Beenleigh in the south, Victoria Point in the east and Karana Downs in the west, and passengers are charged based on the number of FlatFare zones included in their journey.

On the Gold Coast, the taxis can travel as far as Paradise Point in the north, Varsity Lakes in the south and Nerang in the west.

== See also ==
- Translink
- Transport for Brisbane
- Brisbane City Council
