= University of Queensland bus station =

Bus station in Brisbane

University of Queensland
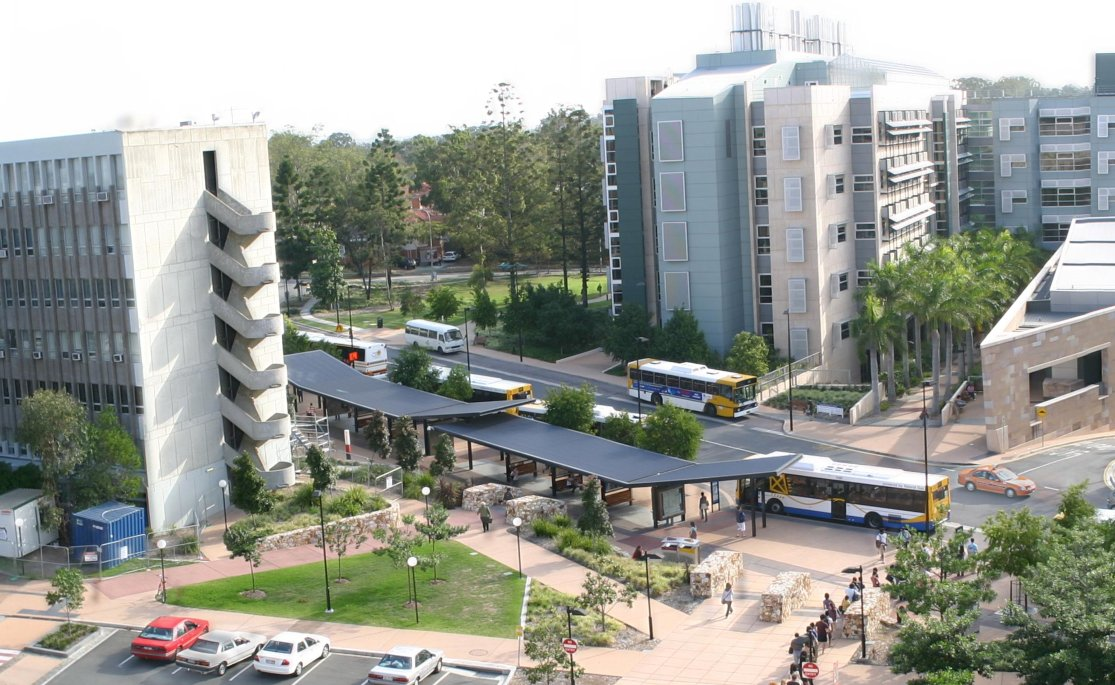

General information
- Location: Chancellors Place, St Lucia
- Coordinates: 27.49835°S 153.010963°E
- System: Bus Station
- Platforms: 1 side platform, 5 stops

Construction
- Parking: Park 'n' ride
- Accessible: yes

Other information
- Fare zone: 1
Location

The University of Queensland Bus Station, at the University of Queensland's St Lucia Campus, is served by Translink bus routes. It is located at Chancellor Place and is one of the primary means of accessing the university by public transport, the others being by CityCat and the UQ Lakes Bus Station. It is in Zone 1 of the Translink integrated public transport system.

By 2012, about 2 million passengers were using the bus stop each year, making it one of the busiest bus stops in Brisbane.

== See also ==
- Public transport in Brisbane
