= Taringa railway station =

Railway station in Queensland, Australia

Taringa
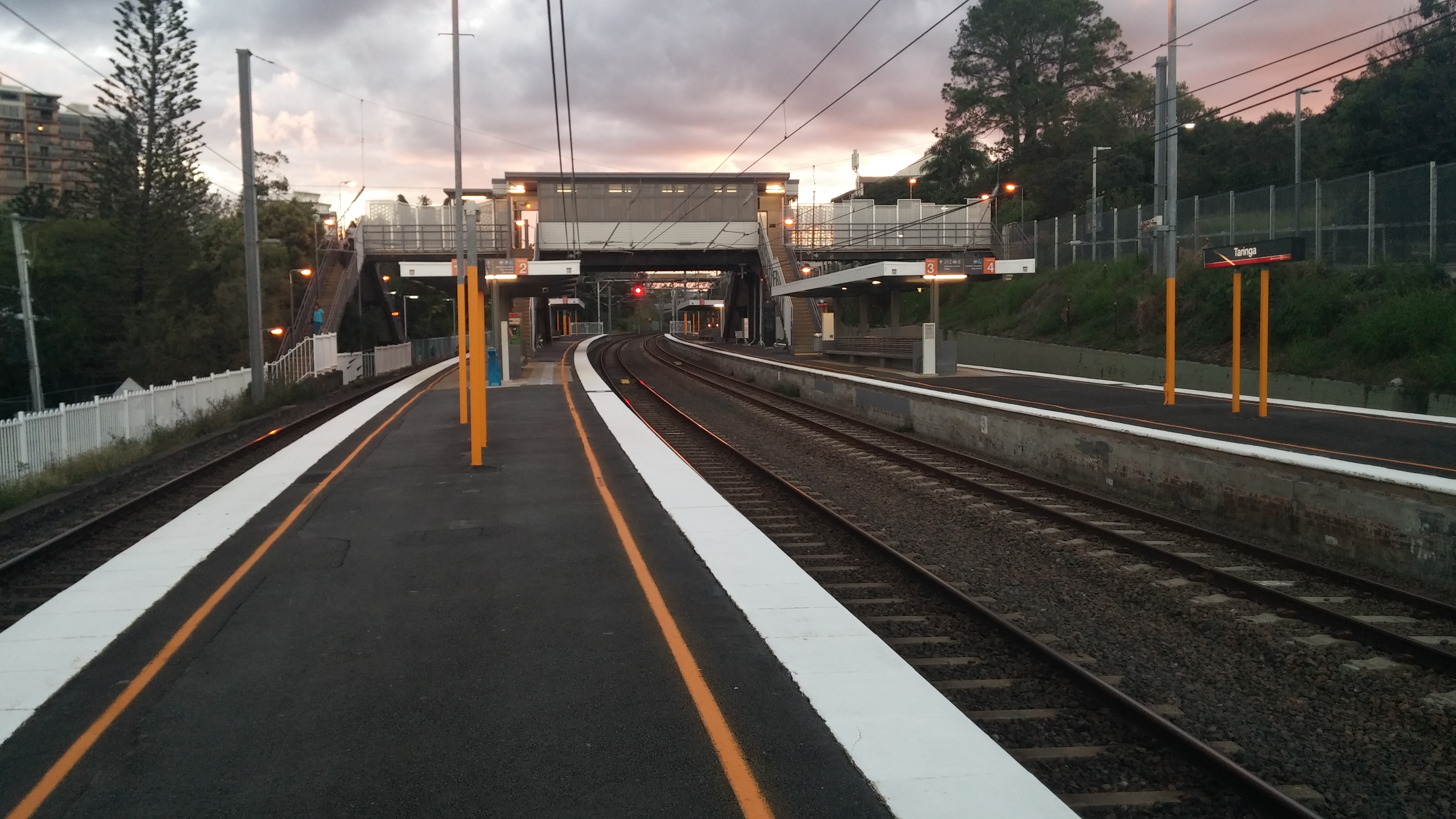
- Westbound view from Platform 2 in April 2014

General information
- Location: Pike Avenue, Taringa
- Coordinates: 27°29′35″S 152°58′54″E
- Owner: Queensland Rail
- Operator: Queensland Rail
- Lines: T1 Ipswich/Rosewood; T2 Springfield Central
- Distance: 5.96 kilometres from Central
- Platforms: 4 (2 island)

Construction
- Structure type: Ground
- Accessible: No

Other information
- Status: Staffed
- Station code: 600291 (platform 1); 600292 (platform 2); 600293 (platform 3); 600294 (platform 4)
- Fare zone: Zone 1
- Website: Queensland Rail

History
- Opened: 14 June 1875; 151 years ago

Services
Preceding station	Queensland Rail	Following station
Toowong towards Caboolture, Nambour or Gympie North	Ipswich/Rosewood line	Indooroopilly towards Ipswich or Rosewood
Toowong towards Kippa-Ring	Springfield Central line	Indooroopilly towards Springfield Central
Location

Taringa is a railway station operated by Queensland Rail on the Ipswich/Rosewood and Springfield lines. It opened in 1875 and serves the Brisbane suburb of Taringa. It is a ground level station, featuring two island platforms with two faces each.

== History ==
Taringa station opened on 14 June 1875 as West Milton. The station was rebuilt in the 1950s as part of the quadruplication of the line.

== Services ==
Taringa is served by Citytrain network services operating from Nambour, Caboolture, Kippa-Ring and Bowen Hills to Springfield Central, Ipswich and Rosewood.

== Platforms and services ==
Taringa platform arrangement
Platform	Line	Destination	Notes
1	T1 Ipswich/Rosewood	Ipswich or Rosewood	
1	T2 Springfield Central	Springfield Central	
2	T1 Ipswich/Rosewood	Roma Street (to Caboolture and Nambour/Gympie North lines)	
2	T2 Springfield Central	Roma Street (to Kippa-Ring line)	
3	T1 Ipswich/Rosewood	Ipswich or Rosewood	
4	T1 Ipswich/Rosewood	Roma Street (to Caboolture and Nambour/Gympie North lines)	
4	T2 Springfield Central	Roma Street (to Kippa-Ring line)	
