= Toowong railway station =

Railway station in Queensland, Australia

Toowong
- Station entrance in September 2026

General information
- Location: Sherwood Road, Toowong
- Coordinates: 27°28′34″S 152°59′49″E
- Owner: Queensland Rail
- Operator: Queensland Rail
- Lines: T1 Ipswich/Rosewood; T2 Springfield Central
- Distance: 4.67 kilometres from Central
- Platforms: 4 (2 island)

Construction
- Structure type: Underground
- Accessible: Yes

Other information
- Status: Staffed
- Station code: 600287 (platform 1); 600288 (platform 2); 600289 (platform 3); 600290 (platform 4)
- Fare zone: Zone 1
- Website: Queensland Rail

History
- Opened: 14 June 1875; 151 years ago
- Rebuilt: 1960

Services
Preceding station	Queensland Rail	Following station
Auchenflower towards Caboolture, Nambour or Gympie North	Ipswich/Rosewood line	Taringa towards Ipswich or Rosewood
Auchenflower towards Kippa-Ring	Springfield Central line	Taringa towards Springfield Central
Location

Toowong is a railway station operated by Queensland Rail on the Ipswich/Rosewood and Springfield lines. It opened in 1875 and serves the Brisbane suburb of Toowong. It is an underground station, featuring two island platforms.

== History ==
Toowong station opened on 14 June 1875. The station was submerged during the 1893 floods.

The station was rebuilt in 1960 as part of the quadruplication of the line. In the 1980s, the air rights were sold and redeveloped as the Toowong Village shopping centre.

== Services ==
Toowong is served by City network services operating from Nambour, Caboolture, Kippa-Ring and Bowen Hills to Springfield Central, Ipswich and Rosewood.

== Platforms and services ==
Toowong platform arrangement
Platform	Line	Destination	Notes
1	T1 Ipswich/Rosewood	Ipswich or Rosewood	
1	T2 Springfield Central	Springfield Central	
2	T1 Ipswich/Rosewood	Roma Street (to Caboolture and Nambour/Gympie North lines)	
2	T2 Springfield Central	Roma Street (to Kippa-Ring line)	
3	T1 Ipswich/Rosewood	Ipswich or Rosewood	
4	T1 Ipswich/Rosewood	Roma Street (to Caboolture and Nambour/Gympie North lines)	
4	T2 Springfield Central	Roma Street (to Kippa-Ring line)	
