= Station Link =

Station Link or Stationlink is a brand applied by various transport operators to bus services that connect with railway stations. Examples include:

== Australia ==
A service was provided in 2018/2019 between Chatswood and Epping stations while the Epping to Chatswood railway line was converted to become part of the Metro North West Line. The service was operated by Hillsbus and Transdev NSW under contract to Transport for NSW.

A service was operated by Transport for Brisbane under contract to Translink while Salisbury, Rocklea, Moorooka, Yeerongpilly, Yeronga, Fairfield and Dutton Park stations were rebuilt during construction of the Cross River Rail.

== United Kingdom ==
From June 1996 until August 2002, Thorpes operated two circular routes ran in Central London under contract to Transport for London, connecting the mainline railway stations at Paddington, Marylebone, Euston, St Pancras, King's Cross, Liverpool Street, Fenchurch Street, London Bridge, Waterloo and Victoria.

== United States ==
OC Bus 400 series routes in Orange County, California.
