= BaT Tunnel =

Overview
- Status: Cancelled
- Owner: Queensland Rail
- Locale: Brisbane
- Termini: Dutton Park; Bowen Hills
- Stations: 3
- Website: Queensland Government

Service
- Type: Commuter Rail / Bus Rapid Transit
- System: City network
- Services: Brisbane Airport line Gold Coast line
- Operator(s): City network

Technical
- Line length: 4 km (2.5 mi)
- Track gauge: 1,067 mm (3 ft 6 in)

The BaT (Bus and Train) project was a proposed north–south tunnel that would provide bus and rail modes of transport by combining a new underground rail line and busway in a single, double-decked, 15m-wide tunnel beneath the Brisbane River and Brisbane central business district. The tunnel was to have three underground stations at Woolloongabba, George Street and Roma Street with Dutton Park upgraded.

The BaT project was planned to be a critical new link in South East Queensland’s public transport network by creating new major transport hubs across the city and inner city suburbs, and facilitating existing locations such as The Gabba, and the new Queen's Wharf development on George Street.

The project replaced the original 2010 Cross River Rail proposal before its cancelation in March 2015 and replacement with the current Cross River Rail project.

== 2013 plan ==
In November 2013, the Queensland Government announced a revised plan for the BaT (Bus and Train) project as an alternative to the previous Cross River Rail proposal. The revised plan involved a 14.8m external diameter (13.5m internal diameter) 5.4 kilometres (3.4 mi) tunnel to accommodate both a dual track rail line on the lower level and a two lane busway above. The cost was expected to be $5billion with construction proposed to start in 2015 and completion in 2021. Citytrain having increased at an annual average of 3.4% between 2006 and 2012, compared to an average annual population increase of 2.4% over the same period, confirming forecasts that the Merivale Bridge will would reach capacity some time between 2016 and 2021.

The proposal commenced in the vicinity of Dutton Park station, with two new underground stations at Woolloongabba (adjacent to The Gabba) and George Street (in the CBD) adjacent to a proposed casino redevelopment site. The balance of the proposal involved the previously proposed underground station at Roma Street and the line connecting to the Exhibition line near Bowen Hills. The Underground stations were to also be busway stations. The southern end of the busway was proposed to connect directly to the existing Eastern Busway, with the northern end then proposed to connect to the Northern Busway via a bridge over the railway and adjacent Inner City Bypass motorway.

The stations were proposed to have 175 metre platforms to cater for future seven carriage trains, with the peak hour headway of 2.5 minutes between trains giving a notional capacity of 24 trains per hour in each direction. This was proposed to facilitate an increase in Gold Coast line services by 80% when it opened, and was also stated as catering for the 'Hillcrest (New Beaudesert) line by 2031'. That proposed line involves converting the existing standard gauge line from the Acacia Ridge freight terminal (just south of Salisbury station) to dual gauge. Hillcrest is a suburb west of Browns Plains and north of Greenbank. The standard gauge line passes west of Beaudesert on its way to the New South Wales border, and re-establishment of Bromelton station may be what is intended by the term 'New Beaudesert line'.

No surface property resumptions were required under this revised plan. Dutton Park station was proposed to be closed, as it would need to be demolished as part of the project and the government stated that its patronage level of ~150 passengers per peak hour didn't justify the $150m cost to rebuild the station. Following public objections, particularly to the proposed walkways from Boggo Road station, 800 metres away (proposed to provide replacement access to the Princess Alexandra Hospital, the major facility adjacent to Dutton Park station), the government reversed its decision.

The George street station was proposed to be built 48 metres below 63 George Street building on the corner of George and Mary Streets. The George Street building, which houses many state government departments, was to be demolished. The Woolloongabba station was to be 38 metres below surface level, with the Roma Street station to be 31 metres below surface level. The ruling grade in the tunnel was proposed at 3.25% (~1 in 31).

== 2014 revision ==
On 30 November 2014, the State government announced a further revision to the plan affecting the northern section. The tunnel was now proposed to be situated at the western end of Roma Street station, and involve the demolition of the Brisbane Transit Centre's west tower, with a new building to incorporate the BaT Roma Street station and the Transit Centre's bus terminal. The bus tunnel component was planned to connect to the Northern Busway between the Roma Street and Normanby busway stations, with a train-only tunnel to continue under the Normanby Busway station, with a northern portal in the Normanby rail yard, shortening the tunnel length by 1.4 km, to 4 km in total.

The reference design for the tunnel between Dutton Park railway station and Boggo Road busway station showed a 'knock out panel for possible future rail extension'.

== Cancellation ==
Following a change of State Government, in March 2015 the BaT Project was cancelled.
