= Yeerongpilly railway station =

Railway station in Queensland, Australia

Yeerongpilly
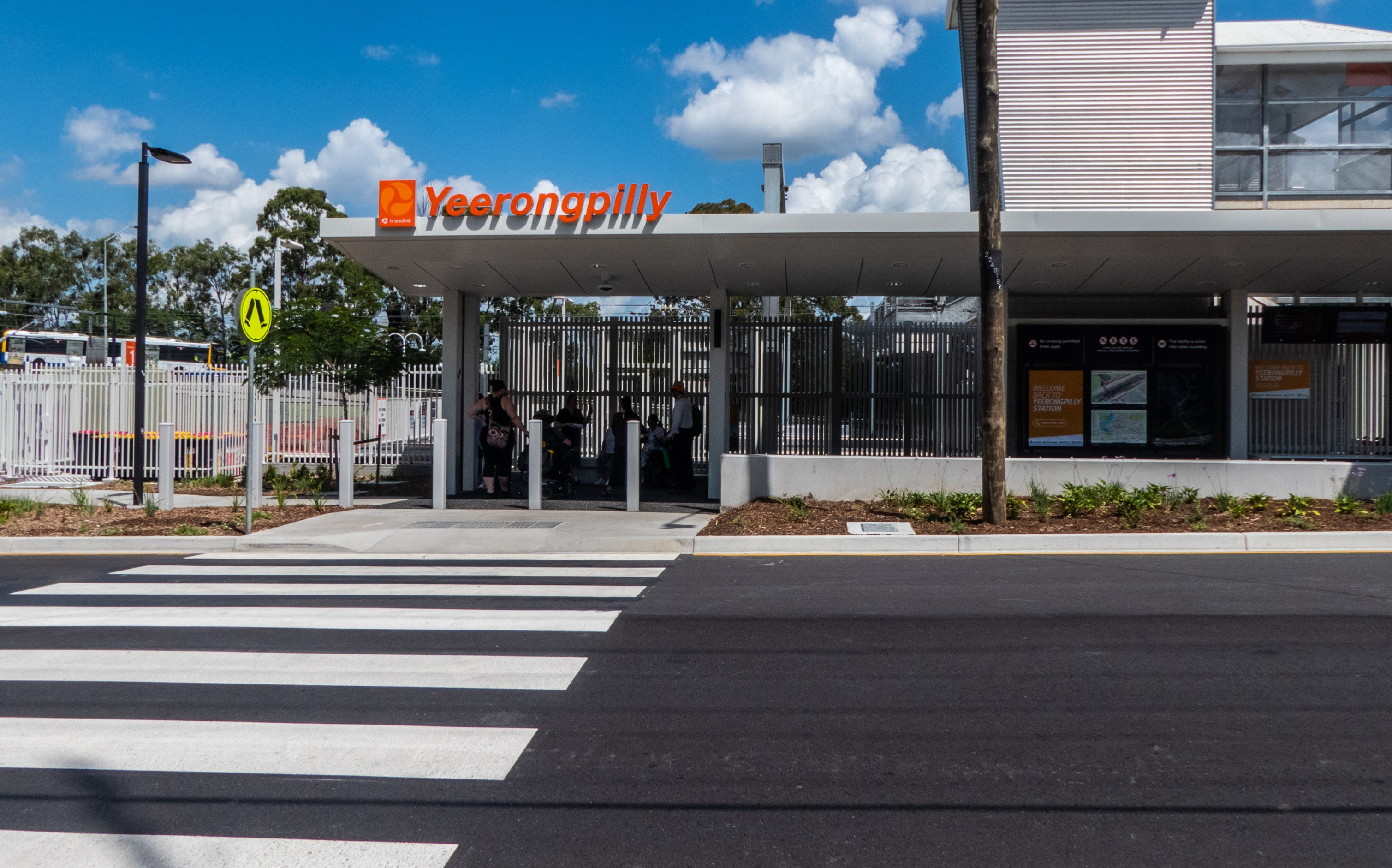
- Wilkie Street station entrance in February 2025

General information
- Location: Wilkie Street, Yeerongpilly
- Coordinates: 27°31′30″S 153°00′50″E
- Owner: Queensland Rail
- Operator: Queensland Rail
- Line: T6 Beenleigh
- Distance: 9.36 kilometres from Central
- Platforms: 2 (1 island)
- Tracks: 5

Construction
- Structure type: Ground
- Parking: 25 bays
- Cycle facilities: Yes
- Accessible: Yes

Other information
- Status: Staffed
- Station code: 600054 (platform 1); 600196 (platform 2)
- Fare zone: Zone 1/2
- Website: Queensland Rail

History
- Opened: 1884; 142 years ago
- Rebuilt: 16 February 2025
- Former names: Logan Junction; South Coast Junction

Services
Preceding station	Queensland Rail	Following station
Yeronga towards Ferny Grove via Roma Street	T6 Beenleigh line	Moorooka towards Beenleigh
Former services
Yeronga towards Bowen Hills	Corinda via South Brisbane line	Tennyson towards Corinda
Location

Yeerongpilly is a railway station operated by Queensland Rail on the Beenleigh line. It opened in 1884 and serves the Brisbane suburb of Yeerongpilly. It is a ground level station, featuring one island platform with two faces.

== History ==
Yeerongpilly station opened in 1884 as Logan Junction with the opening of the railway to Loganlea. It was renamed South Coast Junction in 1885 and again to Yeerongpilly in 1893.

It was the junction station for the Corinda line until passenger services ceased on the line in June 2011 and were replaced by Transport for Brisbane's route 104.

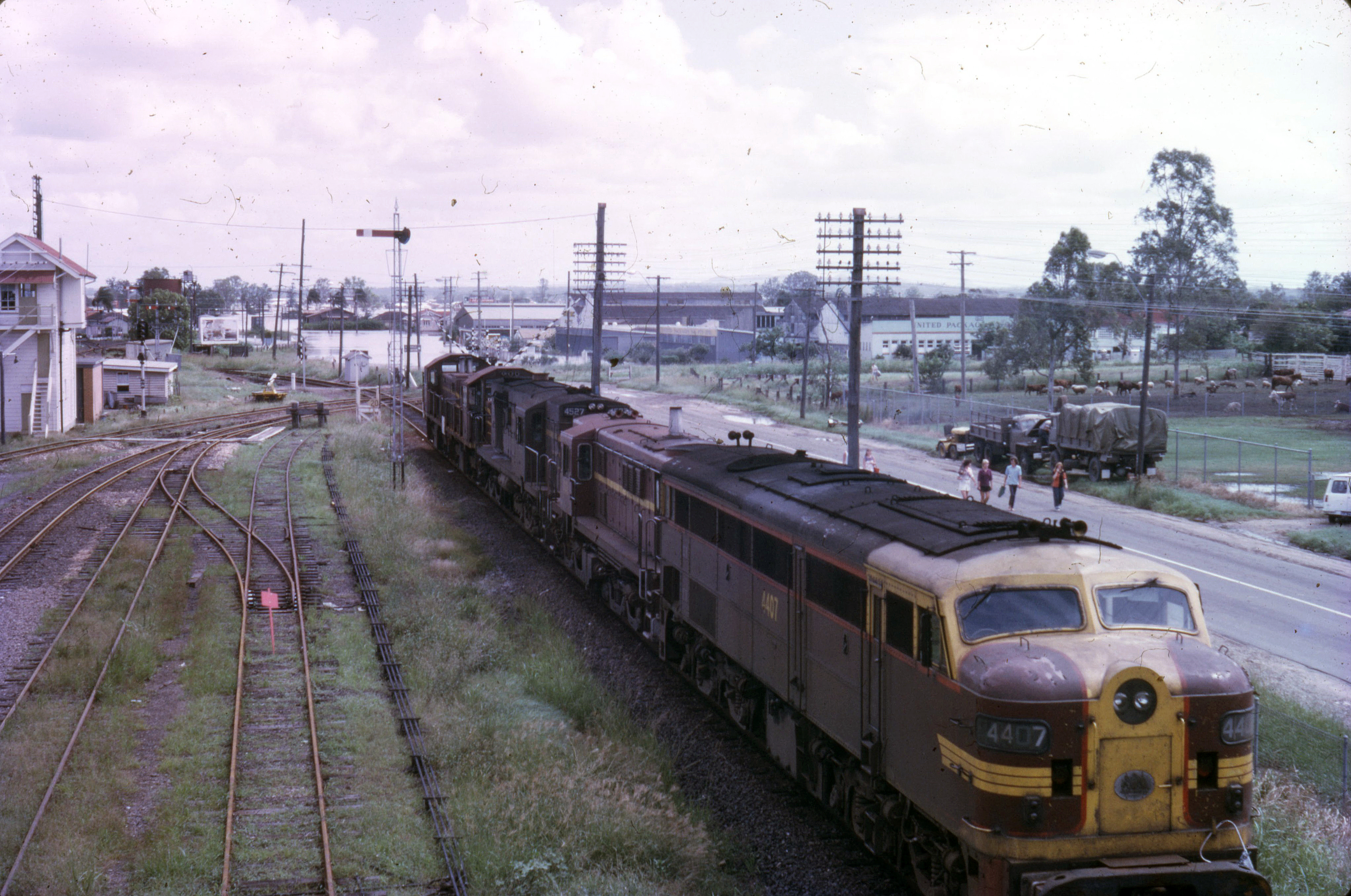
Yeerongpilly railway station in the 1974 Brisbane floods (flood waters behind the train)

The design for the Queensland Tennis Centre included extending the footbridge over Fairfield Road, however when the centre was built it was not included. Construction eventually commenced in July 2010, with the new bridge opened on 29 December 2010 in time for the 2011 Brisbane International.

With the opening of the NSW North Coast line to South Brisbane in 1930, the New South Wales Government Railways opened a depot to the south of the station. This closed on 13 February 1997 with the turntable relocated to the new National Rail Acacia Ridge facility.

In 1995, as part of the construction of the Gold Coast line, the standard gauge line from South Brisbane was converted to dual gauge. This was later extended to Salisbury.

The station was closed for a full accessibility rebuild from 18 September 2023 to 16 February 2025 as part of the Cross River Rail project.

== Services ==
Yeerongpilly station is served by all stops Beenleigh line services from Beenleigh, Kuraby and Coopers Plains to Bowen Hills and Ferny Grove.

== Platforms and services ==
Yeerongpilly platform arrangement
Platform	Line	Destination	Notes
1	Under construction		
2	T6 Beenleigh	Beenleigh	
3	T6 Beenleigh	Roma Street (to Ferny Grove line)	

== Transport links ==
Transport for Brisbane operate three bus routes via Yeerongpilly station:

- 104: Corinda to Princess Alexandra Hospital
- 105: Indooroopilly to Brisbane City via Yeronga
- 108: Indooroopilly to Brisbane City
