= Yeronga railway station =

Railway station in Queensland, Australia

Yeronga
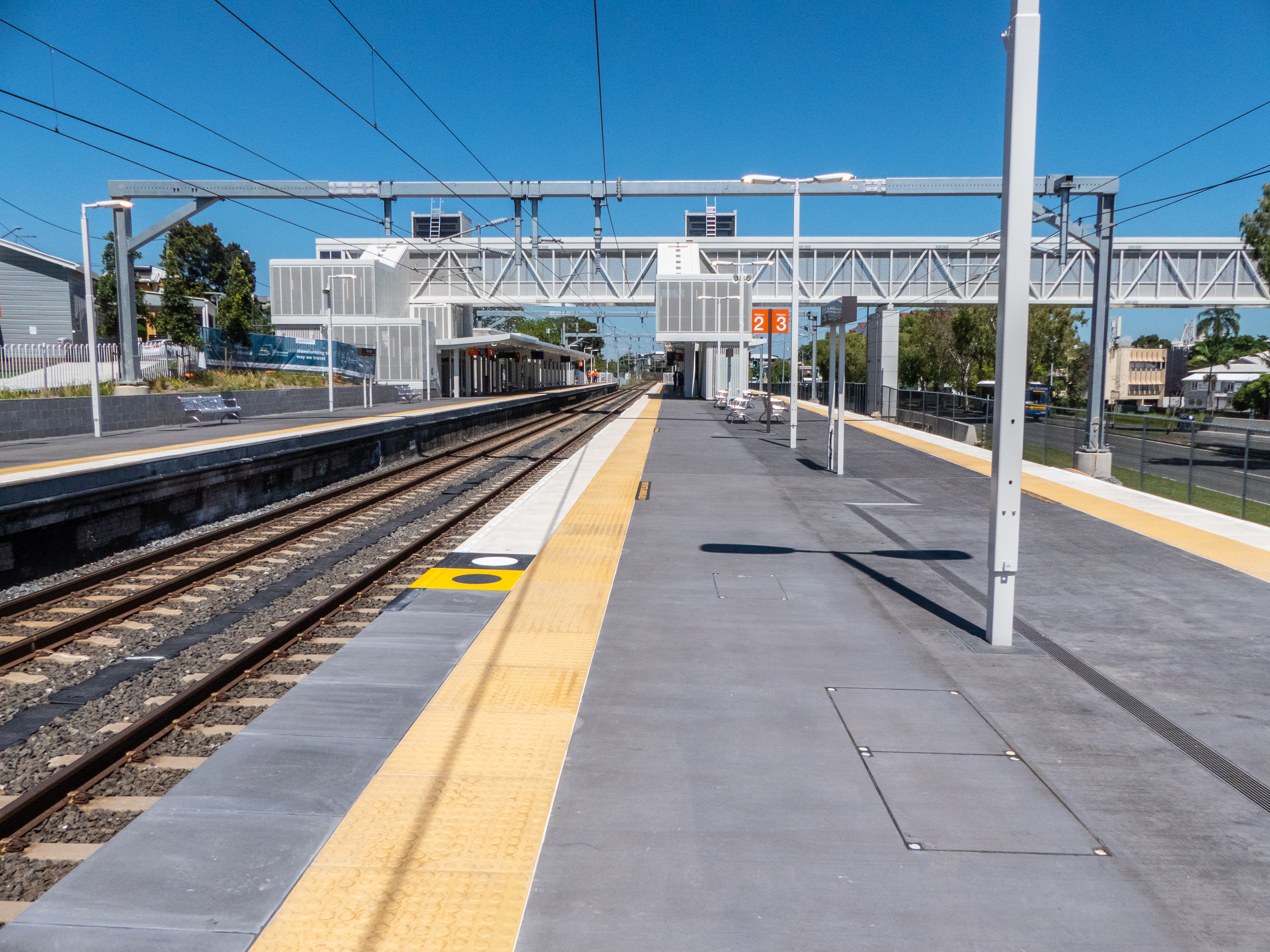
- Southbound view from Platform 2, March 2023

General information
- Location: Fairfield Road, Yeronga
- Coordinates: 27°31′04″S 153°01′01″E
- Owner: Queensland Rail
- Operator: Queensland Rail
- Line: T6 Beenleigh
- Distance: 8.52 kilometres from Central
- Platforms: Old: 2 side platforms New: 1 side platform & 1 island
- Tracks: 3

Construction
- Structure type: Ground
- Parking: 167 bays
- Accessible: Old: No; New: Yes

Other information
- Status: Staffed part-time
- Station code: 600053 (platform 1); 600195 (platform 2)
- Fare zone: Zone 1
- Website: TransLink

History
- Opened: 1885; 141 years ago
- Rebuilt: 28 March 2022

Services
Preceding station	Queensland Rail	Following station
Fairfield towards Ferny Grove via Roma Street	T6 Beenleigh line	Yeerongpilly towards Beenleigh
Location

Yeronga is a railway station operated by Queensland Rail on the Beenleigh line. It opened in 1885 and serves the Brisbane suburb of Yeronga. It is a ground level station, featuring one island platform with two faces and one side platform.

== Services ==
Yeronga station is served by all stops Beenleigh line services from Beenleigh, Kuraby and Coopers Plains to Bowen Hills and Ferny Grove.

Until June 2011, Yeronga was also served by services to Corinda via the Yeerongpilly–Corinda line.

== Cross River Rail ==
As a part of Cross River Rail, Yeronga and 6 other stations were rebuilt. As a result, there was a bus service (Bus route 109) that operates from Boggo Road to Moorooka railway station to supplement the closing of the stations and to alleviate congestion.

The new station reopened on 28 March 2022. The station has new lifts and a new footbridge to go over Fairfield Road, connecting up to local stores, enhancing accessibility. Remaining construction activities will continue at the station until mid-2023, including the addition of a third platform.

== Platforms and services ==
Yeronga platform arrangement
Platform	Line	Destination	Notes
1	T6 Beenleigh	Beenleigh	
2	T6 Beenleigh	Roma Street (to Ferny Grove line)	
3	Not used for regular passenger services		
