= Brisbane Stadium (disambiguation) =

Brisbane Stadium is a planned multi-purpose stadium in Victoria Park, Brisbane, Queensland, Australia.

Brisbane Stadium may also refer to:

- Lang Park, officially "Brisbane Stadium (Lang Park)", in Milton, Queensland
- Brisbane Festival Hall, formerly "Brisbane Stadium", a former indoor arena in Brisbane, Queensland
- The Gabba, officially "Brisbane Cricket Ground", a stadium in Woolloongabba, Queensland
