= Albert Street railway station =

Railway station in Brisbane, Queensland

Albert Street
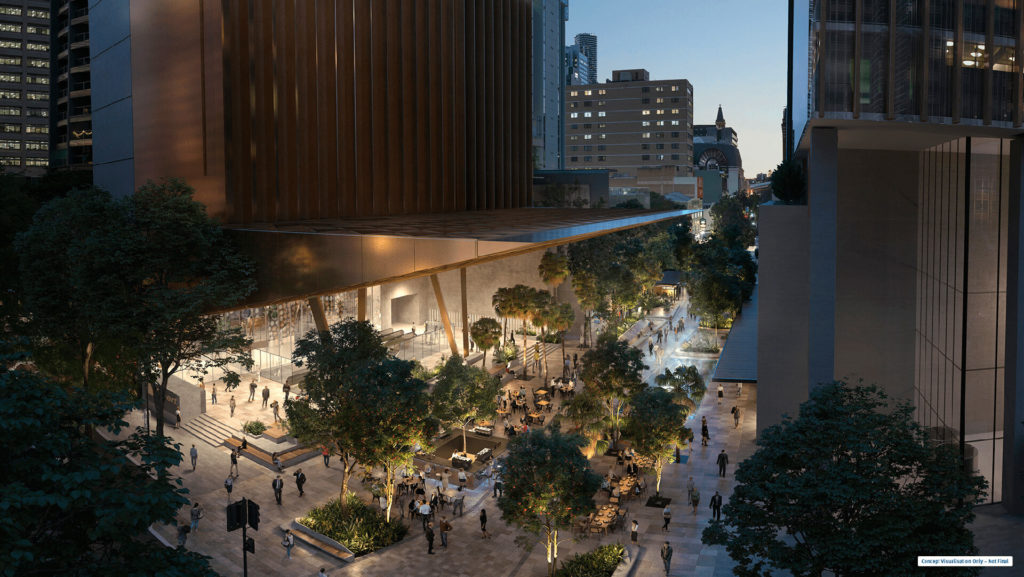
- 3D Render of Albert Street railway station once opened

General information
- Location: Albert Street, Brisbane
- Coordinates: 27.471861°S 153.027478°E
- Owner: Queensland Rail
- Operator: Queensland Rail
- Line: Cross River Rail
- Platforms: 2
- Tracks: 2

Construction
- Structure type: Underground
- Accessible: Yes

Other information
- Status: Under construction
- Fare zone: Go card zone 1
- Website: www.crossriverrail.qld.gov.au

History
- Opening: 2026 (scheduled)
Location

Albert Street railway station is a railway station under construction as part of the Cross River Rail project in the Brisbane central business district in Queensland, Australia. It is the first Brisbane CBD train station to be built in more than 120 years.

To be built as an underground station directly beneath Albert Street, it will consist of two platforms. Construction commenced in October 2019, with it scheduled to open in 2026. The platforms are built at a depth of 31 metres.

The station will provide access to the mixed-use residential, employment and retail precinct adjoining the City Botanic Gardens, the financial district, Queen's Wharf, the government precinct and Queensland University of Technology at Gardens Point. The precinct is expected to attract more than 67,000 commuters each weekday in 2036.

The station has two entrances. The main entrance lies to the south on the corner of Mary Street, while the second entrance is located to the north. A 40-storey, mixed-use commercial building at 101 Albert Street is to be built partially above the station.

Whilst the planned name of the new railway station is Albert Street, a number of names have been proposed to the public, including Brisbane City, City Botanic Gardens and Frog's Hollow, in reference to the former neighbourhood where the station is to be located.

== Construction ==
Because of difficult ground conditions drill and blast techniques were used to excavate space for the station. The design features two shafts between the surface and platform level. The lift shaft for the platform reaches a depth of 50 metres, making it the deepest basement in Brisbane. During construction, needles used for opium smoking, as well as boots, ceramics and coins were unearthed. During construction, 47,305 cubic metres of spoil was removed. Excavation of the station box was completed in April 2022.

Components of the station were lowered into the cavern down a 31 metre deep access shaft. By January 2024 the mezzanine level which consists of 183 pre-cast concrete beams, each up to 19 metres wide and weighing up to 70 tonnes, was completed.

== See also ==
- Queensland Rail City network
- Rail transport in South East Queensland
- Transport in Brisbane
