= Cross River Rail =

Railway project in Brisbane, Australia

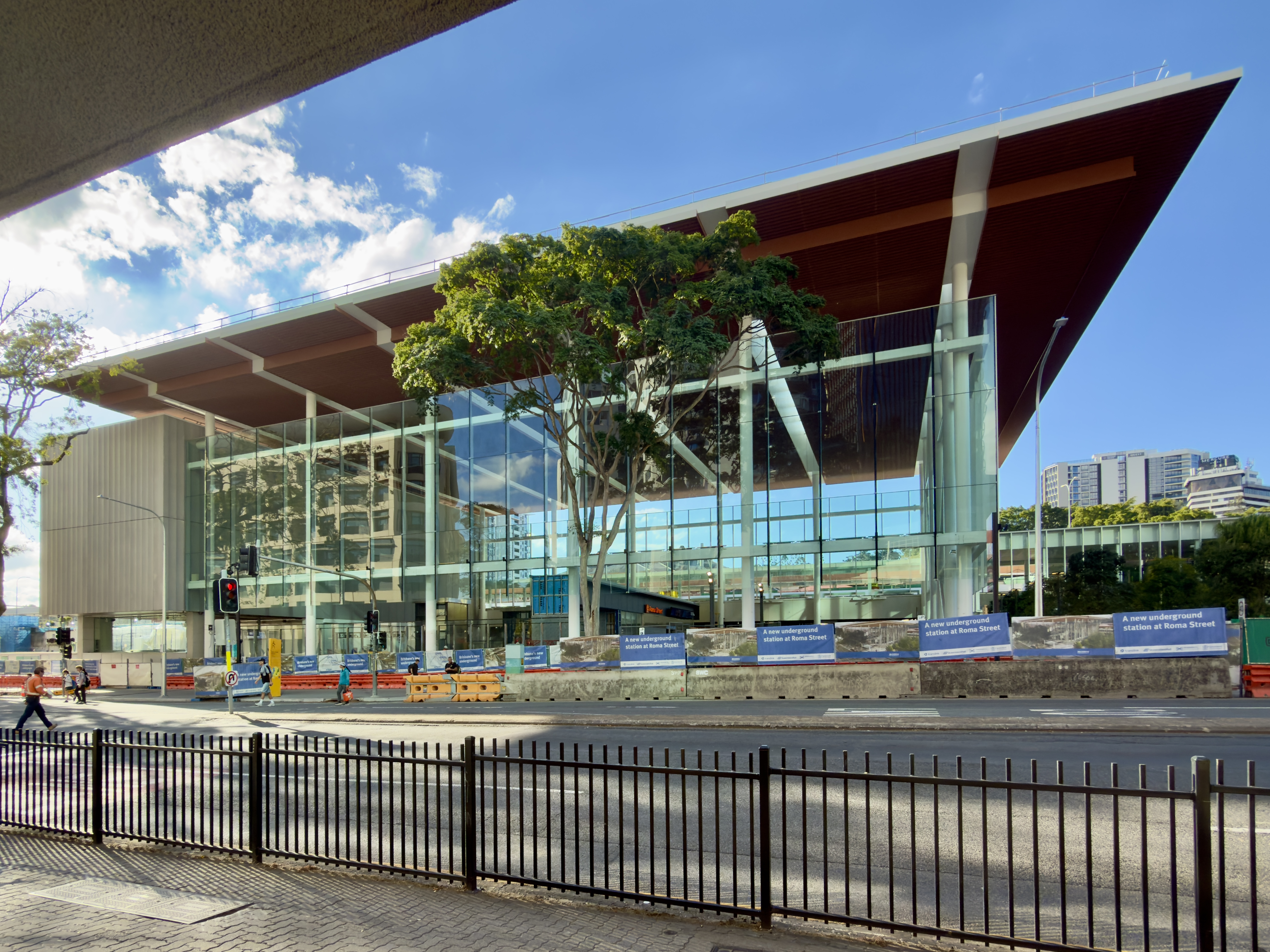
- Cross River Rail construction site at Roma Street station in central Brisbane, 2026

Overview
- Status: Under construction
- Owner: Queensland Government
- Locale: Brisbane, Queensland, Australia
- Termini: Dutton Park station; Exhibition station
- Stations: 6
- Website: crossriverrail.qld.gov.au

Service
- Type: Commuter rail / rapid transit
- System: Queensland Rail City network
- Operator: Queensland Rail
- Rolling stock: New Generation Rollingstock; Queensland Train Manufacturing Program

History
- Planned opening: Unknown, expected to be 2029

Technical
- Line length: 10.2 km (6.3 mi)
- Track gauge: 1,067 mm (3 ft 6 in)

Cross River Rail (CRR) is an underground heavy rail project under construction in Brisbane, Queensland, Australia. The project will see the development of a new heavy rail line underneath the Brisbane River, together with the construction of four underground stations in Brisbane’s inner suburbs and the redevelopment of existing stations along the Beenleigh and Exhibition railway lines.

The business case for the project was released in August 2018, with construction commencing in September 2019. The project replaced the planned 2013 Underground Bus and Train project, later named the BaT Tunnel, which in turn replaced the original 2010 Cross River Rail proposal. It is the largest infrastructure megaproject ever undertaken within Queensland.

Cross River Rail consists of a new 10.2 km (6.3 mi) line through the CBD from Dutton Park in the city's south to Bowen Hills in the city's north, connecting existing rail lines. The project includes 5.9 km (3.7 mi) of twin tunnels and will deliver four new underground stations at Boggo Road, Woolloongabba, Albert Street and Roma Street, with Exhibition station also being upgraded. Tunnelling for the project was completed in 2021, with construction planned to be completed by 2029. It also includes seven upgraded stations and three new stations servicing the Gold Coast.

The project provides a second rail crossing of the Brisbane river due to concerns that the only inner-city rail river crossing, the Merivale Bridge, would reach capacity. According to the project's business case, without the new tunnel, overcrowding on most lines would be expected by 2026. Cross River Rail is considered to be the highest infrastructure priority by the Queensland Government. Infrastructure Australia evaluated the business case in 2017 and expressed concerns that the rail patronage projections may not be achieved and that the benefits in the business case may be overstated. However, Infrastructure Australia still listed Cross River Rail as a priority project.

Under the plan, Queensland Rail Citytrain will operate in three sectors, all connecting at the existing or new underground Roma Street stations. Sector One will connect the Gold Coast and Sunshine Coast directly, operating trains from Varsity Lakes and Beenleigh through to the Redcliffe Peninsula, Nambour and Gympie. Sector Two will link the Rosewood and Springfield lines through Central to Brisbane Airport and Shorncliffe. Sector Three will run Ferny Grove trains through Central and Southbank to Cleveland.

== Name ==
The project has been known as Cross River Rail since its inception in 2010, with the exception of the Bus and Train Tunnel (BaT) proposal, which lasted from 2013 to 2015. In May 2024, the Liberal National Party (LNP) announced that, if elected at the 2024 state election, they would officially rename the Cross River Rail corridor the "Elizabeth line", in honour of Queen Elizabeth II. The LNP launched an online petition following the Queen's death in September 2022 to seek support for the name change, and later claimed to have received close to 5,000 signatures. The Labor Party opposed the proposition, arguing that Cross River Rail is not its own line and, therefore, should not be named as such. Then-minister for transport, Bart Mellish, stated that because Cross River Rail will be integrated into the broader South East Queensland train network, it would be inappropriate to designate the new corridor as a standalone railway line, and that this would possibly confuse commuters and overseas visitors. In May 2025, following the LNP's 2024 election victory, Deputy Premier Jarrod Bleijie recommitted his party to the name change, which was affirmed by a government spokeswoman. However, the new transport minister, Brent Mickelberg, stated that although there were no immediate plans to rename Cross River Rail, discussions could take place once the project is finalised.

== History ==
=== 2010 Cross River Rail proposal ===
A report titled the 2008 Inner City Rail Capacity Study predicted that the demand for Brisbane peak train services would double by 2016. The Infrastructure Australia review of the current project highlighted that the 2011 business case projected the 2016 rail patronage – without Cross River Rail – as 374,000 passengers per day. The Queensland Rail Annual Report for 2015–16 reports patronage of approximately 150,000 passengers per day for the Citytrain network in 2015–16. Between Salisbury and Dutton Park the existing line is used by freight trains traveling to the Port of Brisbane and a terminal at Acacia Ridge, and the expected rise in the number of passengers services may interrupt freight services unless a new line is built. The Merivale Bridge is the only inner-city rail crossing in Brisbane, and by 2016 it was expected to be over capacity, leading the Queensland Government to plan for this project.

The original plans for the project were released on 11 November 2010. The project included a 9.8-kilometre (6.1 mi) tunnel, two new surface stations as well as four new underground stations. Upgrades to Moorooka and Rocklea were also proposed. Underground stations were proposed to include retail facilities, and a maximum of 120,000 passengers were claimed to be able to be moved during the morning peak period.

The city station was to be built under Albert Street, with two entrances and allowing for trains up to 200 m (656 ft 2 in) in length. Proposed stations at Woolloongabba and Exhibition were to be named The Gabba and The Ekka respectively.

Yeerongpilly was chosen as the southern portal because it had less impact on residents than a tunnel entrance at Fairfield. An entrance there would allow trains on the Ipswich railway line to use the tunnel via the Tennyson railway line. It also allowed the existing rail yards at Clapham to be used as stabling yards, negating the need to build a new storage depot for trains elsewhere.

==== 2012 revised plan ====
In June 2012, the newly elected Newman Government announced plans for a scaled down version of the project estimated to cost $4.5 billion. The revised plan excluded upgrades to existing stations and extra above-ground train lines south or north of the new tunnel. The revised plan was expected to be completed by 2020. Thirty-nine commercial properties were to have been resumed for the project, including the Royal on the Park hotel and another nine properties in the central business district. One hundred and five residential properties at Yeerongpilly were to have been resumed for the expansion of the Yeerongpilly railway station.

=== 2013 Bus and Train Tunnel proposal ===
In November 2013, the Queensland Government announced a revised plan for the BaT (Bus and Train) project as an alternative to the previous Cross River Rail proposal. The revised plan involved a 14.8 m (48 ft 7 in) external diameter (13.5 m (44 ft 3 in) internal diameter) 5.4 kilometres (3.4 mi) tunnel to accommodate both a dual track rail line on the lower level and a two lane busway above. The cost was expected to be $5 billion with construction proposed to start in 2015 and completion in 2021. Citytrain patronage is quoted as having increased at an annual average of 3.4% between 2006 and 2012, compared to an average annual population increase of 2.4% over the same period, confirming forecasts that the Merivale Bridge will reach capacity some time between 2016 and 2021. However, this capacity constraint may be over pessimistic as doubt has been cast on the pre-2009 figures supplied by Queensland Rail due to double counting of patronage figures.

== Project description ==
The current 2016 proposed 10.2-kilometre (6.3 mi) rail link involves building a new 5.9-kilometre (3.7 mi) tunnel under the Brisbane River and the Brisbane central business district, creating five new inner city station precincts, and increasing the core capacity of the rail network. The alignment will extend from Dutton Park, through four new underground stations at Boggo Road (adjacent to the Boggo Road busway station), Woolloongabba, Albert Street and Roma Street, towards upgraded stations at Exhibition and Bowen Hills. A new line through the city centre was needed because of the centralised nature of the existing inner-city network of stations. If any inner-city services were interrupted it led to traffic bottlenecks that rippled across city-wide services.

The tunnel will utilise the European Train Control System, and Automatic Train Operation. The maximum capacity is 24 trains per hour in each direction. According to the project's business case the desired design speed is 80 km/h (50 mph). The four new underground stations will have platform screen doors, a first for Brisbane. Platforms will be 220 metres (720 ft) long to accommodate future nine-car trains, though the tunnel will initially run six-car trains. The project will utilise a combination of construction methods, including cut-and-cover station box construction for some stations, mined station caverns for the CBD stations, and both Tunnel Boring Machines and Road-headers for tunnelling.

In December 2019, work commenced on the demolition of the Brisbane Transit Centre. With an estimated capital cost of $5.4 billion it is expected to be the largest transport project ever built in Queensland. In addition, the project's detailed business case identifies the project will result in costs of $4.9 billion for additional services and complementary growth projects, and $4.4 billion for operation and maintenance costs over a 30-year period. On 13 June 2017, the Queensland Government allocated $2.8 billion to start building the rail link. The remaining $2.6 billion of capital costs and other project costs is proposed to be allocated in future budgets. Infrastructure Australia has observed that early project designs formed the basis of the project cost estimates and are prone to design maturity risks. Construction started in September 2017, with completion scheduled by 2024. The Labor Government has stated the project will provide more than 1,500 jobs each year during construction, and boost the Queensland economy by $70 million.

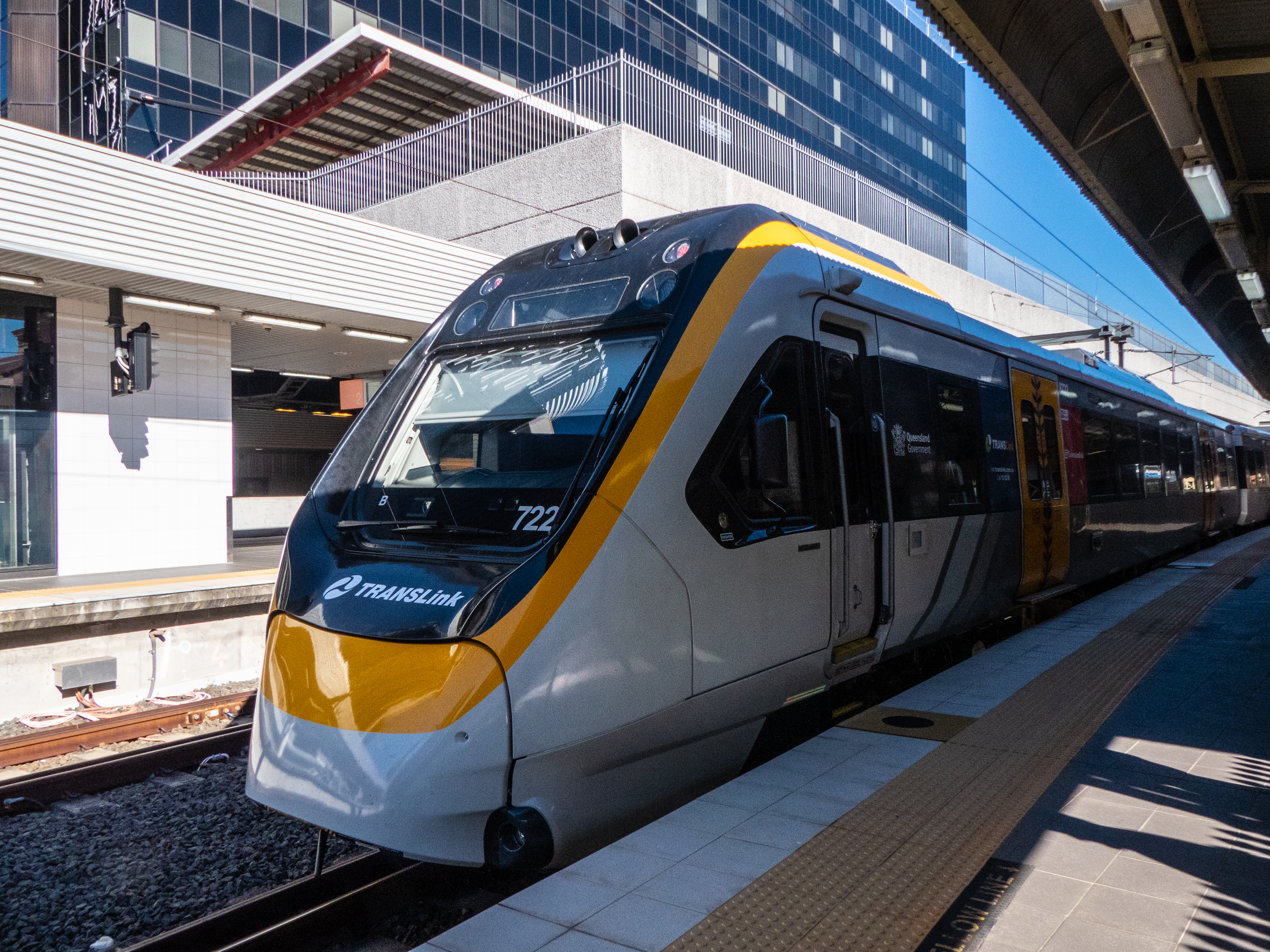
Queensland Rail's New Generation Rollingstock are compatible with Cross River Rail's European Train Control System and will be used in the new tunnels.

The New Generation Rollingstock fleet will operate in the tunnels. The Queensland Government has also initiated a process of building a new fleet of 65 Electric Multiple Units (not to be confused with the EMU class trains that were retired by Queensland Rail in 2025) capable of operating on the new corridor, with the government committing $600 million to the first 20 trains in 2020. In 2021, three manufacturers were shortlisted for the project and the Queensland Government committed $7.1 billion to build all 65 trains, with construction to take place at a purpose-built facility in Maryborough. The design of the trains, and the eventual service plan for Cross River Rail, have not been detailed by the government.

=== Delivery ===
The project is being delivered through public-private partnerships and contracts, and is arranged into three major infrastructure packages. The first is the Tunnel, Stations and Development public-private partnership to deliver the main underground and tunnelling works, the Rail, Integration and Systems alliance to deliver the rail system upgrades, and the European Train Control System contract to deliver the new signalling system. These contracts were awarded in 2019.

=== Sectorisation ===
Cross River Rail will add an additional sector to the rail network, replacing the current main and suburban sectors. Exact operations of the network are yet to be publicly revealed, however in 2022 SEQ Rail Connect was published by the Department of Transport and Main Roads. The document serves as a high level conceptual plan for integrating tunnel operations into the existing network with an emphasis on high service levels and network reliability. Sectorisation was chosen over grade separation to reduce construction and maintenance costs while allowing for high frequencies. The sectorised network will also reduce the propagation of service perturbation, ensuring any delays are contained within a single sector. According to SEQ Rail Connect the three sectors will consist of the following line pairs:

==== Sector 1 ====
Sector 1 will operate north-south via the rebuilt Exhibition station and the Cross River Rail tunnel. Northern Lines include the Sunshine Coast line, Caboolture line and the Redcliffe Peninsula line. Southern Lines include the Gold Coast line and Beenleigh line.

==== Sector 2 ====
Sector 2 will operate east-west via the existing inner-city core network. Eastern Lines are the Shorncliffe line, Airport line and Doomben line. Western Lines include the Ipswich and Rosewood line and Springfield Central line.

==== Sector 3 ====
Sector 3 will operate east-west via the existing inner-city core network and the Merivale bridge incorporating the Ferny Grove and Cleveland lines. Exact line pairings and operations have not been publicly revealed by the State Government.

== Stations ==
As part of the project 4 new underground stations will be built in Brisbane, 8 stations will be rebuilt including Exhibition station and stations between Dutton Park and Salisbury, and 3 new stations will be built on the Gold Coast line.

Four new underground rail stations will be built in central Brisbane, while Exhibition station will be expanded. Dutton Park railway station is being relocated and rebuilt to the south of Annerley Road.

=== Boggo Road ===
Boggo Road in the inner-city suburb of Dutton Park will be a busy transport hub with a direct interchange available with the Brisbane Metro. The station will provide direct pedestrian access to Princess Alexandra Hospital and is proposed that 134 trains will pass through the station during the morning peak. Easy access to the University of Queensland will be available by transfer at the nearby Boggo Road busway station.

=== Woolloongabba ===
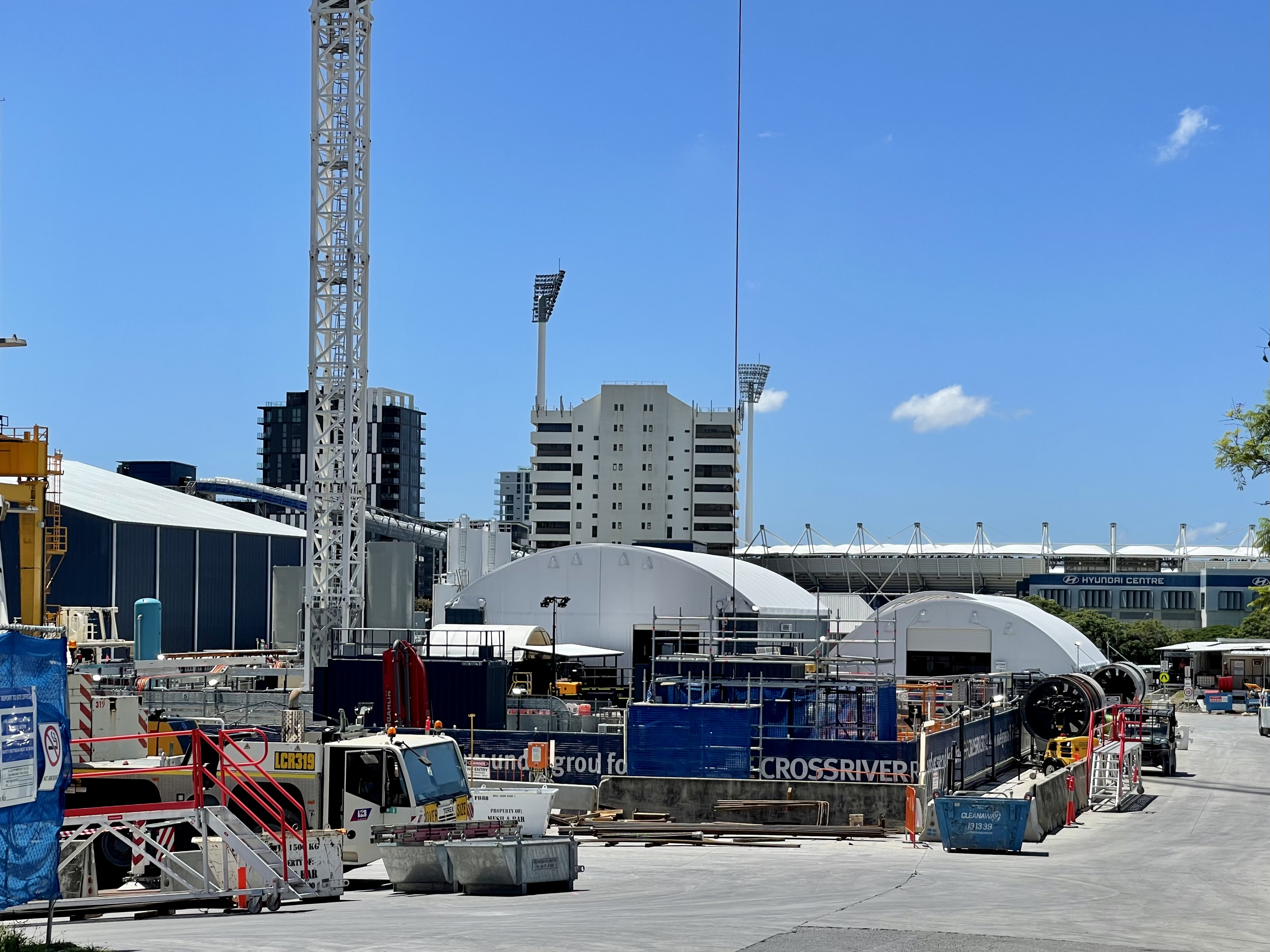
Woolloongabba railway station under construction in February 2021

Woolloongabba will provide direct access to the Gabba Stadium and to the Mater health precinct. It has nearby access to the high capacity South East Busway to the west. The Gabba was planned to be rebuilt for the 2032 Brisbane Olympics, to serve as the main stadium. In March 2025, the location was changed to Victoria Park, where a new stadium is to be constructed to serve as the main stadium.

=== Albert Street ===
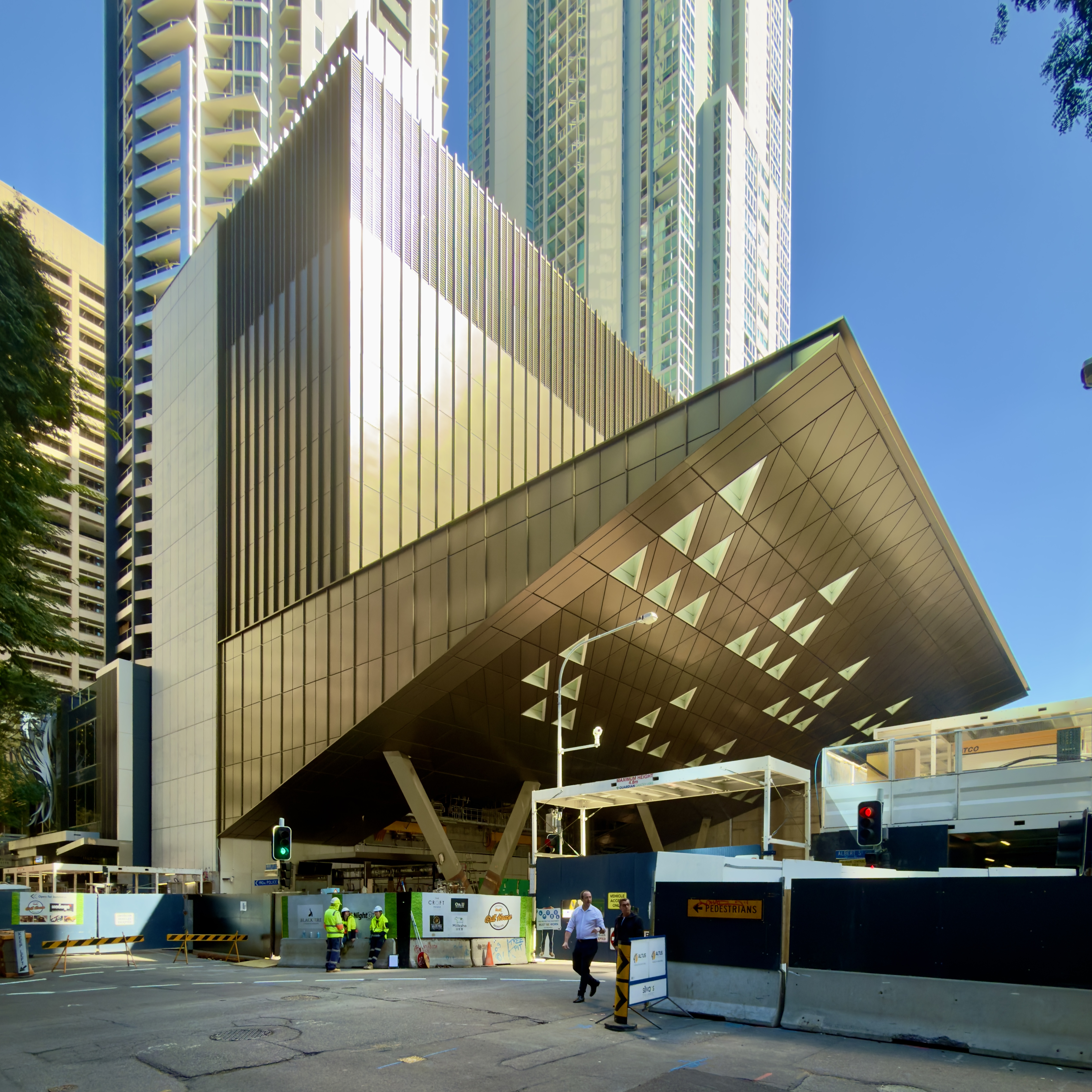
Construction of Albert Street railway station, 2026

Albert Street will provide rail services to the southern part of the Brisbane CBD, providing direct access to the Parliament of Queensland and Queensland University of Technology, Gardens Point Campus. A station in the southern CBD was vital as both the existing Roma Street station and Central station are located in the northern part of the city. A station in this area places it within walking distance of new growth areas such as Queen's Wharf and 1 William Street.

=== Roma Street ===
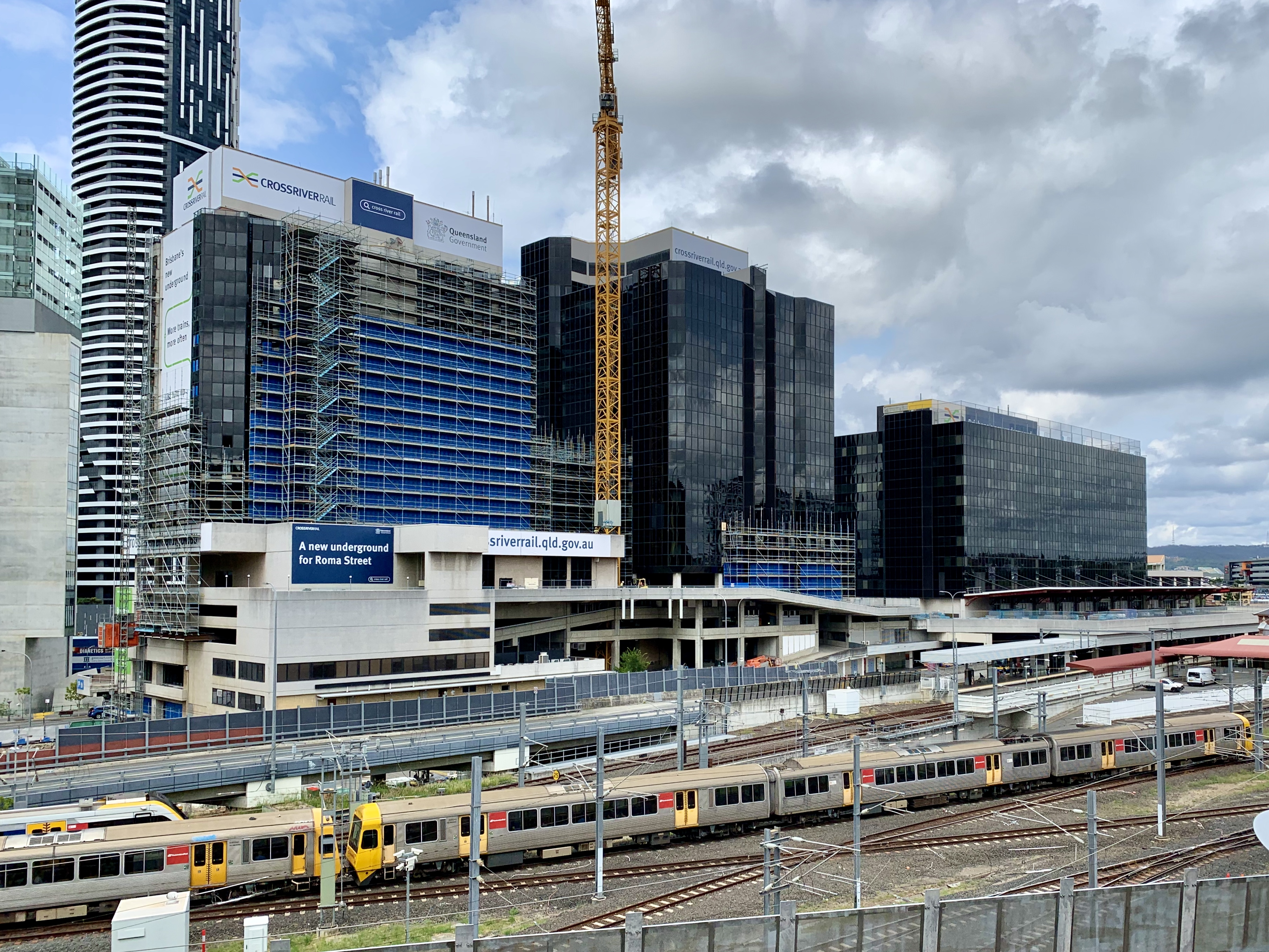
Demolition of the Brisbane Transit Centre complex in January 2020, to make way for the new Roma Street station entrance.

The new underground Roma Street station will be an extension of the existing ground-level station that will provide direct access to the existing bus and train network as well as the Brisbane Metro. Demolition of the Brisbane Transit Centre commenced in December 2019, with services relocated partially underground near the underground platform entrances. A set of new high rise buildings will occupy the site.

The subway and busway platforms at Roma Street station are also receiving a facelift as part of the project, to better integrate the new and existing station. Customers transferring from the above ground station to the underground or vice versa will benefit from a tap-less interchange.

=== Exhibition ===
The existing Exhibition station in the suburb of Bowen Hills will undergo an extensive upgrade. The station only opens a few times a year, servicing special events such as the Brisbane Ekka held at the Brisbane Showgrounds. After the station is upgraded, it will open year-round with high-frequency services connecting the surrounding residential community.

=== Dutton Park to Salisbury Station Upgrades ===
Seven existing rail stations will be upgraded at Dutton Park station, Fairfield station, Yeronga station, Yeerongpilly station, Moorooka station, Rocklea station and Salisbury station. Stations will be rebuilt with additional accessibility features (such as braille maps and rubber platform gap fillers), high level platforms, new lifts, new enclosed stairs and overpasses for weather protection, and new drop-off and cycling facilities. Stations will also receive an additional third platform apart from Dutton Park station which will also be relocated and rebuilt to the south of Annerley Road. Yeerongpilly station's existing lifts and footbridge will be retained.

=== Gold Coast Line ===
In July 2021, the State Government announced that a further three stations would be built on the Gold Coast railway line as part of Cross River Rail. These will be located at Pimpama, Hope Island and Merrimac. On 20 October 2025, Pimpama station opened. This was followed by the opening of Hope Island Station on 18 May 2026, which makes two out of three new Gold Coast stations complete.

Barrambin Station (proposed)

Following the announcement of a new stadium and aquatic centre at Victoria Park for the 2032 Olympics, a new station has been proposed in this area due to the considerable distance from Exhibition station. This proposed station would be built at grade, immediately north of the Northern Tunnel Portal and would use an existing pedestrian walk over the Inner City Bypass to service Victoria Park.

== Construction ==
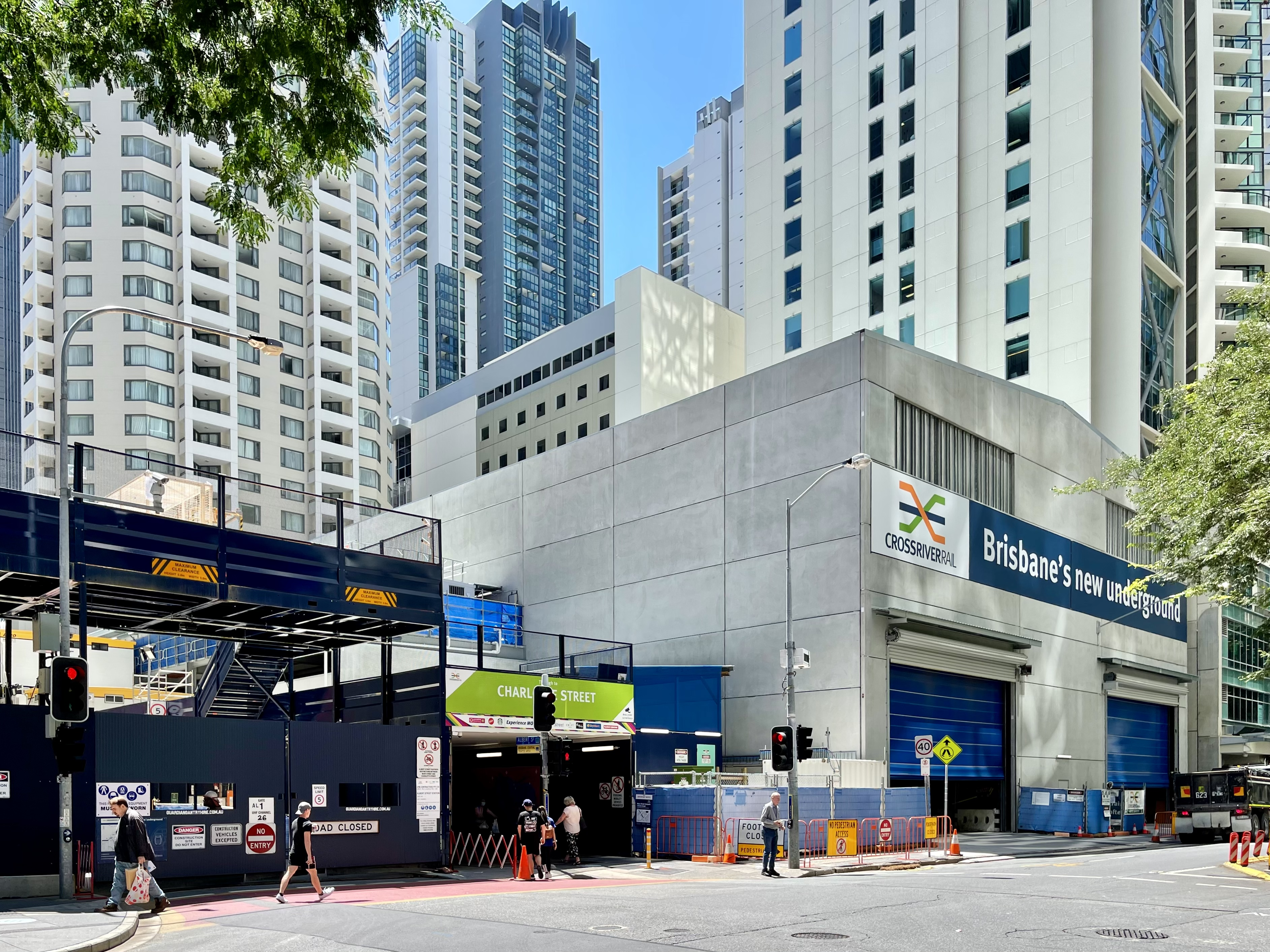
Albert Street railway station under construction in February 2021

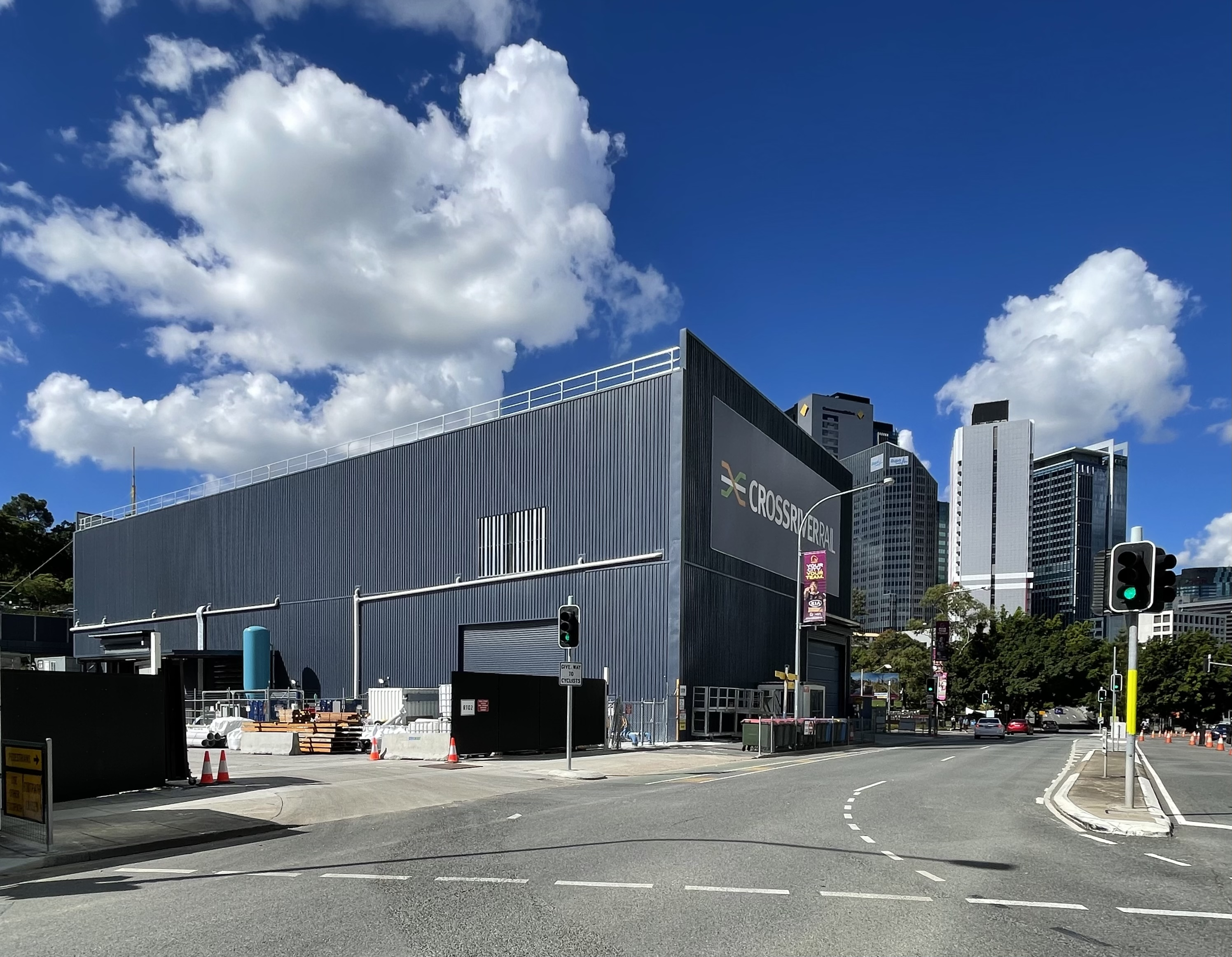
Construction site of new underground Roma Street railway station in April 2021

In April 2016, the Queensland Government announced it would pass legislation to establish the Cross River Rail Delivery Authority to deliver the new project and any related public transport projects. After finalisation of a business case in August 2017, construction officially started in September 2017, when work began on demolishing the defunct GoPrint building at Woolloongabba, to make way for Cross River Rail.

In April 2019, the Queensland Government appointed a CIMIC Group led consortium to deliver various aspects of the project. The consortium began work in late 2019, with a five year construction time frame.

In June 2021, construction was halted over one weekend because of worker concerns about the potential release of dangerous silica dust from the conveyor belt carrying tunnel spoil to the surface.

Spoil from the diggings is transported to Rochedale where it is made into bricks at a brickworks. The bricks will be used in housing construction in South East Queensland.

One of the tunnel boring machines (TBM) was named after Professor Else Shepherd, the other after Merle Thornton. Pre-cast concrete segments were manufactured at Wacol by Wagners, a Toowoomba-based construction company. TBM Else completed its tunnel boring when it broke through to the northern portal on 25 November 2021. The second machine completed its tunnelling on 17 December 2021. By September 2022, track had been laid under the river linking Albert Street and Woolloongabba stations.

Jacobs Engineering Group is responsible for reconfiguring the existing network, supply and installation of supporting rail systems and seven station upgrades.

The first test train entered the northern tunnel portal in October 2024. Despite much of Roma Street Station and the northern portal being complete, the rest of project is still in heavy construction phase.

In December 2024, the Minister for Transport and Main Roads announced a 3 year opening delay due to budget blowouts, strike action, and delays in new rollingstock. This claim was however contradicted by the national rail safety regulator.

== Other projects ==
=== Sunshine Coast Line ===
In March 2022, it was announced that the Maroochydore railway line would be planned and built ahead of the 2032 Brisbane Olympics, with a number of new stations on the branch line and trains running through Cross River Rail.

== Accidents and incidents ==
- On 15 July 2023, at approximate 8:00 PM, an Aurizon freight train collided with an unmanned excavator that had been left on the tracks following maintenance work earlier that day. In response, multiple investigations were launched by Queensland Rail, the Office of the National Rail Safety Regulator, and the Australian Transport Safety Bureau.
- On 25 July 2023, a 54-year-old worker fell approximately 12 metres from scaffolding at the Boggo Road station site. Queensland Fire and Rescue had to use a crane to safely bring the injured man out of the site, and he was later taken to the Princess Alexandra Hospital, Brisbane. Following this, an investigation was launched by Workplace Health and Safety Queensland.
- On 25 July 2023, a heavy steel rod fell through the windscreen of a forklift on the Roma Street site. No injuries were reported from the incident.

== See also ==
- Brisbane Metro
- List of transport megaprojects
- List of tunnels in Australia
- Transport in Brisbane
- Queensland Rail City network, Brisbane's current rail network
