= Woolloongabba railway station =

Railway station in Brisbane, Australia

Woolloongabba
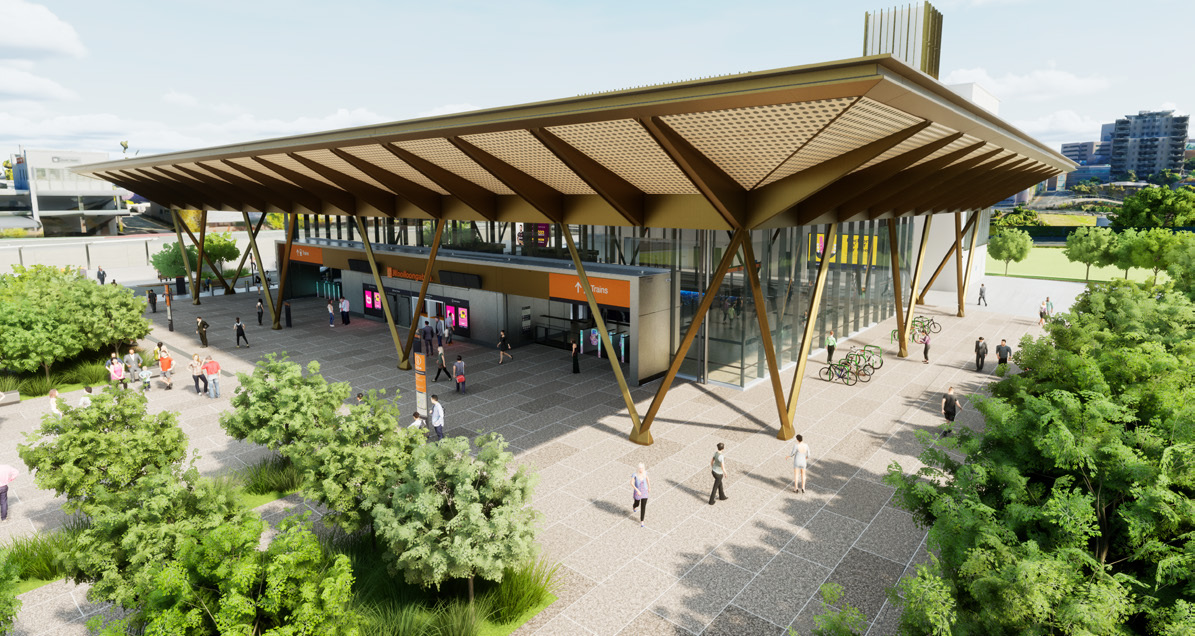
- 3D render of Woolloongabba railway station once opened

General information
- Location: Main Street, Woolloongabba
- Owner: Queensland Rail
- Operator: Queensland Rail
- Line: Cross River Rail
- Platforms: 2
- Tracks: 2
- Connections: Bus

Construction
- Structure type: Underground
- Accessible: Yes

Other information
- Status: Under construction
- Fare zone: Go card zone 1
- Website: www.crossriverrail.qld.gov.au

History
- Opened: 2026 (scheduled)
Location

Woolloongabba railway station is a railway station currently under construction as part of the Cross River Rail project in the Brisbane suburb of Woolloongabba.

The new station will be located underground, beneath The Gabba, and will consist of two platforms with a connection to the nearby bus station. Construction commenced in November 2019, and it is scheduled to open in 2026. The platforms are being built at a depth of 27 metres, and will have a length of 220 metres.

The station will feature artwork by local artist Elisa Jane Carmichael.

== Construction ==
The station is built using a full cavern construction method. It was important to design lifts that can handle the expected surge capacity during large sports events at the nearby Gabba. Similar to Boggo Road railway station the ground is heavily fractured, but at Woolloongabba the cavern sits underneath a layer of that kind of rock. The cavern was excavated using roadheaders.

During construction a toothpaste box, a perfume bottle and bottles that once contained alcohol as well as other food items were found. Animal bones, including pig, sheep goats and cows and pieces of leather from shoes, shoe soles, leather belts and off cuts were also discovered.

The station served as the main support site for the construction project. It was centrally located and had adequate space for materials that created handling and logistical support efficiencies. The site handled the majority of spoil handling movements, having good access to the Pacific Motorway.

The first of several escalators were installed by September 2023, marking the move to the mechanical and electrical fit out phase of construction. A total of 24 escalators will be installed.

== See also ==
- Transport in Brisbane
