= Brisbane Stadium =

Proposed stadium in Brisbane, Australia

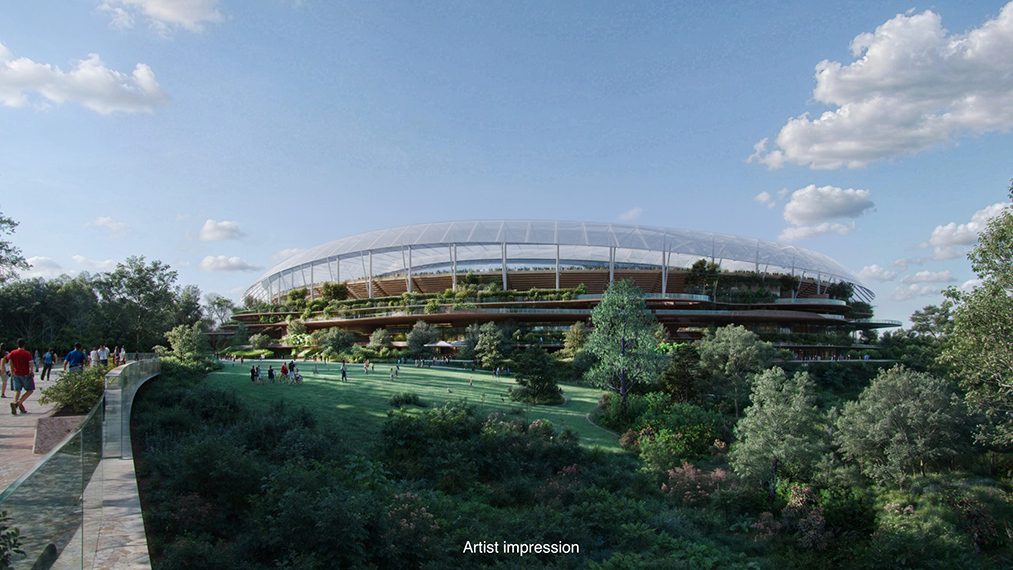
- Conceptual rendering of the stadium
- Interactive map of Brisbane Stadium
- Location: Victoria Park, Brisbane, Queensland, Australia
- Coordinates: 27°27′1″S 153°1′12″E
- Capacity: 63,000 (seated)

Construction
- Groundbreaking: 2027 (expected)
- Opened: 2031/2032 (expected)
- Cost: A$3.785 billion (estimated)
- Architects: Cox Architecture; Hassell; Azusa Sekkei
- Structural engineers: Arup; Schlaich Bergermann Partner
- General contractors: BESIX Watpac; John Holland Group

Tenants
- AFL: Brisbane Lions (2033); Cricket: Queensland Bulls (2033); Brisbane Heat (2033)

Brisbane Stadium is a planned multi-purpose stadium to be built in Victoria Park, in the Brisbane suburb of Herston. It will serve as the main stadium for the 2032 Summer Olympic and Paralympic Games. The 63,000-seat stadium is expected to host the opening and closing ceremonies, as well as the athletics events during the games. Following the conclusion of the Olympics and Paralympics, it will replace the Gabba as Brisbane's main Australian rules football and cricket stadium, becoming the new home grounds of the Brisbane Lions in the Australian Football League (AFL), the Queensland Bulls in domestic cricket, and the Brisbane Heat in the Big Bash League (BBL) and Women's Big Bash League (WBBL).

The planned location of the stadium has drawn opposition groups and has ongoing legal challenges. The stadium development is part of the 2032 Delivery Plan, announced to the public on 25 March 2025 by the Crisafulli government. It falls within the A$7.1 billion funding envelope set aside for 2032 Games infrastructure.

== Location ==
The proposed stadium is to be located in Victoria Park, which is a heritage listed park located in Herston and Spring Hill, north of the Brisbane central business district. Multiple locations within the park were looked at and a site near to Gilchrist Avenue was identified.

== History ==
=== Background ===
Victoria Park was traditionally a meeting and gathering place for Indigenous groups travelling through the area. The park over the years had hosted a migrant workers' camp, a shanty town and a medical precinct. The park was named Victoria Park in 1875.

During the years of World War II, the site was partially occupied by the forces of the United States, and had many military designated buildings constructed. After the war and until the late 70s the buildings were used as temporary accommodation. The site had been long neglected for future development, as factors such as swampy grounds, unexploded ammunition from World War II, and previously used rubbish dumping grounds have posed safety risks and budget blow outs for projects on the site. Part of the park was converted into a golf course in 1931, but Brisbane City Council developed plans in 2020 to convert the 64 hectare site back into a park.

=== Cancelled Gabba reconstruction ===
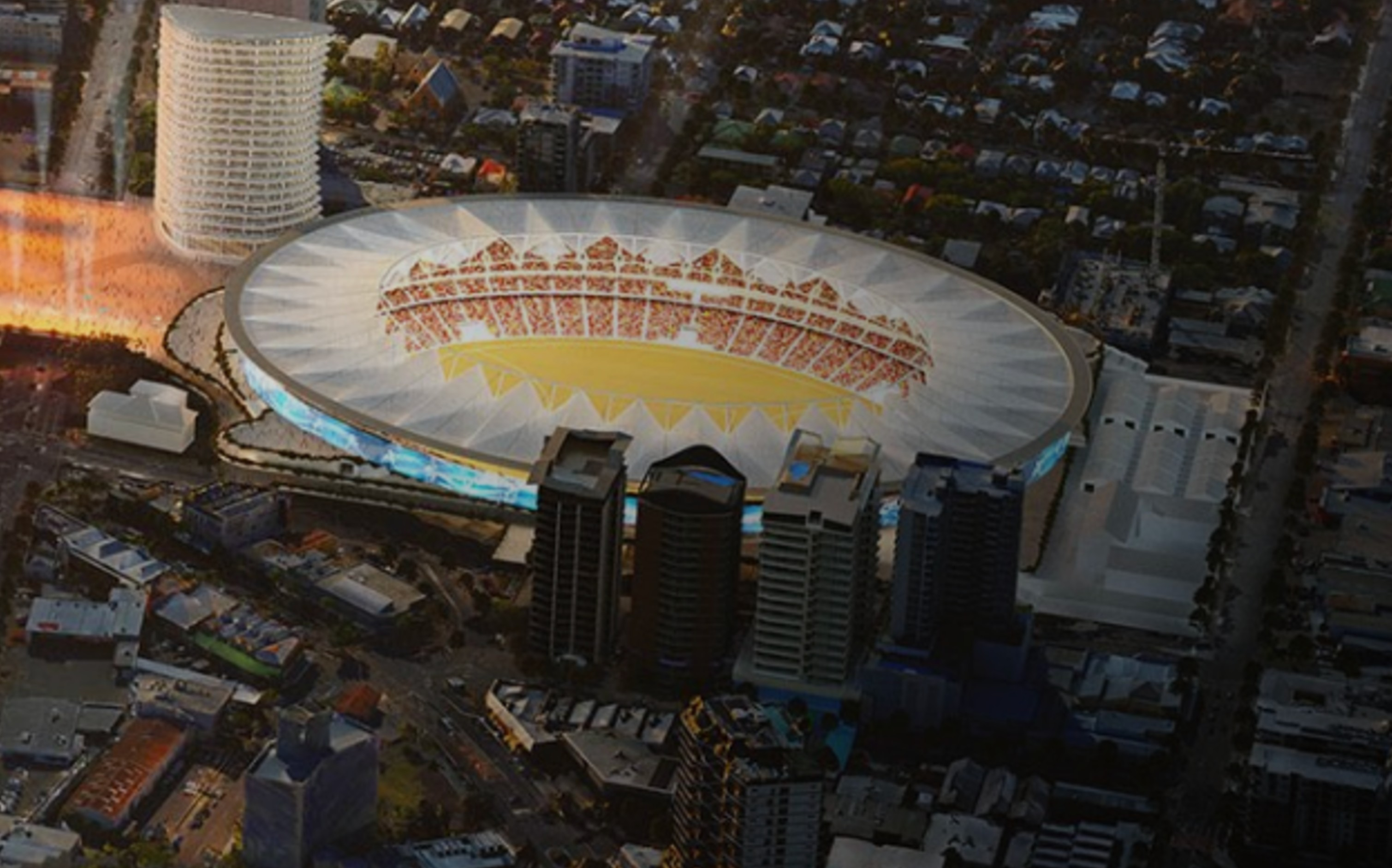
Concept art from 2022 for the proposed redevelopment of the Gabba

On 24 February 2021, the Future Host Commission for the Summer Olympic Games selected Brisbane as its preferred candidate to host the 2032 Summer Olympics and Paralympics; Brisbane were officially awarded the Games on 21 July. In April 2021, as part of its venue plans for the Games, the state of Queensland announced plans for a A$1 billion reconstruction of the Gabba to serve as the main stadium. The reconstruction would expand its seating capacity to 50,000, and feature a new pedestrian plaza.

Scrutiny over the Gabba project grew after the state of Victoria withdrew from hosting the 2026 Commonwealth Games due to cost concerns; by February 2023, the projected cost had grown to A$2.7 billion, which would be paid entirely by the state. In December 2023, Lord Mayor of Brisbane Adrian Schrinner withdrew his support for the Gabba project, stating that Brisbane 2032 had "become more about overpriced stadiums rather than the promise of vital transport solutions", and that parallel plans for a A$137 million stadium at the Brisbane Showgrounds as a transitional venue for the Gabba's tenants during construction (with Brisbane City Council, the Brisbane Lions, and Cricket Australia being expected to cover two thirds of the cost) were the "final straw".

In March 2024, following an independent review launched by Queensland Premier Steven Miles and led by former Lord Mayor Graham Quirk, the Gabba project was scrapped in favour of refurbishing Lang Park and Queensland Sport and Athletics Centre (QSAC) to host the ceremonies and athletics respectively. A new stadium at Victoria Park was recommended by Quirk before being dismissed by the government due to its A$3.4 billion cost; Miles stated that he wanted Brisbane 2032 to be a "low-cost" games, and that he could not justify a high-cost stadium "when Queenslanders are struggling with housing and other costs".

In August 2024, a group known as the Brisbane Design Alliance proposed "Northshore Vision 2050": a mixed-use redevelopment of the Northshore precinct in the suburb of Hamilton. The first stage of the project proposed a sports and entertainment district anchored by a new 60,000-seat stadium, as a replacement for the Gabba and a potential Olympic venue. The project was budgeted at A$6 billion, with the developers claiming it would be privately funded; however, the developers also hoped that state land would be granted to them for development and that transport infrastructure would be upgraded. Miles was skeptical of the proposal, arguing that there was "no chance" a stadium could be built solely through private funding and arguing that the plan appeared very preliminary. In September 2024, former politician and Premier of Western Australia, Colin Barnett, suggested during a talk show on 4BC that the Queensland government should consider building a copy of Perth Stadium, which would save time and costs on building a new stadium from scratch, as well as giving Brisbane a modern replacement for the Gabba.

Many Queenslanders had criticised the state government for choosing "embarrassing" and "cheapskate" approaches over a newly built showpiece. During the 2024 Queensland state election campaign, opposition Liberal National leader David Crisafulli promised to launch another independent review if elected, stating that Queenslanders had felt "embarrassed" by the decision to use QSAC (which would have been the smallest Olympic athletics venue since 1928), and that the state government had "locked themselves into a facility that does neither a long-term legacy nor create a world-class buzz." Crisafulli promised to not build a new stadium (and especially to not build one in Victoria Park), and was believed to be backing the Gabba project. In October 2024, the Liberal National Party was elected as the state government, and Crisafulli launched a 100-day independent review.

=== Stadium proposals ===
Multiple proposals were submitted as part of the second review:

- Arcadis presented a proposal to build a new stadium and indoor arena at Victoria Park, and to build an aquatic centre on the site of the Centenary Pool Complex. The overall project was budgeted at A$5.4 billion, which the firm argued was A$200 million cheaper than the combined costs of building the Brisbane Live arena in its current state, and renovating the Gabba, Lang Park, and QSAC. Their proposal for the stadium emphasised that discussions had mainly centred around the "cost" of the games, rather than the long-term "value" for the city. The idea of a stadium at Victoria Park was backed by organising committee president Andrew Liveris.
- IHAL Architects proposed a reconstruction of the Gabba similar to the original proposals, with a 55,000-seat capacity, a new pedestrian plaza that would border with the Riverside Expressway and link a footpath to the Goodwill Bridge, and have the proposed Brisbane Live arena built opposite. The firm described the proposal as the most "logical" and "cheapest" option, and would not "[take] over a park that's so incredible and pristine."
- Richard Kirk Architect proposed the construction of a new 60,000 seat stadium dubbed "Gabba West" above the Woolloongabba railway station, directly across the street from the existing Gabba ("Gabba East"); the outgoing stadium would be used as a practice and support facility during the Games, after which it would be demolished and redeveloped. Kirk argued that this option would create minimal disruption to the suburb, and would not result in the relocation of tenants or nearby buildings such as the East Brisbane State School. Kirk proposed that 40% of the stadium's structure be constructed using renewable materials, and that it be the largest timber-braced stadium in the world. He also stated that unlike the Victoria Park proposals (as it would be built on existing greenfield land), "Gabba West" would be able to achieve a six-star Green Star rating.
- WilkinsonEyre proposed a new 60,000 seat stadium built on the Mayne Yard, a rail yard operated by Queensland Rail. The construction of the stadium would require the relocation of the rail yard. The proposal was modelled after Perth Stadium, and included a warm-up track under the spaghetti junction, a temporary indoor arena (instead of building the Brisbane Live arena) similar to the Basketball Arena that was used for the 2012 Summer Olympics in London, and a residential area. This project was considered to be more costly (expected to be A$6 billion) and logistically challenging compared to the other proposals. Former Premier of Queensland Campbell Newman supported this proposal (along with the Northshore and Gabba proposals), arguing that the Victoria Park plan would lead to a major loss of green space in the city centre.

=== Victoria Park stadium project ===
On 25 March 2025, Premier Crisafulli announced that as a result of the review, a new 63,000-seat stadium would be constructed at Victoria Park to host the ceremonies and athletics. After the conclusion of the Games, the Gabba will be demolished and its site will be redeveloped as a residential neighbourhood; the Olympic stadium will succeed it as Brisbane's main football and cricket stadium. According to the review, the stadium will cost an estimated $3.785 billion, although this figure is yet to be publicly confirmed. Designer Michael Rayner stated that the chosen outcome was similar to a proposal that he mentioned during a lecture in 2019. Rayner noted that a cluster of major venues, which would be "as great a hallmark of Brisbane as Melbourne Park is to Melbourne." Rayner in his proposal thought that the land required for the stadium, Brisbane Live and the pool in the park would less than a third of Victoria Park, leaving some 30 hectares or so for the public, about twice the area of Sydney's Hyde Park. But since Brisbane Live will be constructed somewhere else Rayner thought that the stadium and pool would only take up around 20% of the 64-hectare park. The 100-day review noted that 68% (47.02 hectares) of the total area of the park would be retained as green space, with the stadium itself taking up less than 10% of the area.

Crisafulli apologised for breaking his campaign promise of not building a new stadium for the Olympics, stating that the Gabba was poorly maintained and approaching the end of its useful life, the new stadium would provide a stronger legacy for the Games, and that "any other choice would have meant placing the government's interests ahead of the interests of Queensland".

=== Pre-construction ===
In September 2025, the Queensland Government appointed Arup Group to be the contractor for the masterplan, including the stadium, National Aquatic Centre, Olympic Village, and surrounding public and green spaces after previously opening an expression of interest earlier in the month.

On 15 October 2025, geotechnical investigation began on Victoria Park. The GIICA also affirmed that it was working closely with Brisbane City Council to plan appropriate drilling locations, and consulted local aboriginal parties on undertaking duty of care obligations during the process.

In December 2025, The Courier-Mail reported that four architects had been shortlisted to design the stadium, those being Populous, Herzog & de Meuron/Architectus, Gerkan, Marg and Partners/Blight Rayner Architecture, and Warren and Mahoney.

On 5 January 2026, it was announced that the Japanese–Australian design consortium involving Cox Architecture, Hassell and Azusa Sekkei had been selected to be the architects for the stadium. Cox and Hassell were previously architects for Perth Stadium, and have been involved in redevelopments of the Adelaide Oval and the Melbourne Cricket Ground. Azusa Sekkei previously constructed the Japan National Stadium, which was built for the 2020 Summer Olympics and Paralympics.

On 24 March 2026, it was announced that early works was to occur once the land the stadium will be built on is transferred to the Games Independent Infrastructure and Coordination Authority (GIICA) on 1 June. The Queensland Government also confirmed the stadium will be located in a "central position" near Gilchrist Avenue, within proximity to existing transport infrastructure. Onn 9 April 2026, the GIICA announced that two joint ventures had been selected as finalists to be contractors for the construction of the stadium, those being BESIX Watpac-John Holland Group and Built Australia-Sacyr.

In September 2026, an attempt to trademark the name 'Brisbane Stadium' was rejected by IP Australia for being too descriptive and not distinctive.

On 30 September 2026, BESIX Watpac and John Holland Group were selected to be the contractors for the stadium.

== Opposition ==
The construction of a stadium in Victoria Park is opposed by community group Save Victoria Park. They argue that the construction of the park would remove one Brisbane's few inner-city green areas and that the park has the potential to become as valuable a public space as Federation Square, Melbourne and Sydney Park. The group successfully supported the expansion of heritage protection over the entire park in 2025; however this listing was ineffective at protecting the park following the passage of state legislation exempting the stadium from existing state planning, heritage and environmental laws. Queensland Deputy Premier Jarrod Bleijie stated that the "Save Victoria Park are just a bunch of NIMBYs who don't want anything to happen. This park ... was a golf course. Before it was a golf course, it was a dump for goodness sake."

The site of the stadium holds cultural significance to the Turrbal people. The park was a native camping ground and food-gathering place and hosted the corroboree, which is the traditional dance for First Nations people. Historian Ray Kerkhove who had conducted multiple heritage assessments for the park, for different levels of government, stated that the site is probably the most significant site of Indigenous heritage in central Brisbane and that it would be destroyed by the stadium. Yagarabul Elder Gaja Kerry Charlton expressed concerns that "there are ancient trees, artefacts and very important eco-systems existing there... [and that] there may be ancestral remains" that would be damaged by the stadium. These concerns have formed the basis of two legal challenges to the stadium's construction under section 10 of the Aboriginal and Torres Strait Islander Heritage Protection Act (Cth). This federal legislation allows the federal environment minister to make a declaration protecting a site where they are satisfied that "the area is a significant Aboriginal area". Minister Murray Watt stated that he had received 5 applications, one of which was withdrawn and another in relation to drilling in the proposed site, which he rejected. Watt appointed an independent facilitator to mediate in the matter to allow cultural sites to be respected and construction to incorporate heritage and assist him in making a decision on the other three applications.

== Post-Olympic use ==
Following the Olympics, the new stadium will inherit the Gabba's current tenants, including the Brisbane Lions of the Australian Football League, the Queensland Bulls in domestic cricket, and the Brisbane Heat of the Big Bash League and Women's Big Bash League.

On 26 March 2025, Cricket Australia announced that the first test of the 2033–34 Ashes series would be held at the new stadium, as one of its first major sporting events following the Olympics and Paralympics. As part of this agreement, the Gabba will host Australia test matches annually from 2027–28 to 2031–32 as part of the lead-up to the Olympics.

== Transport ==
Transport around the proposed area of the stadium includes the nearby QUT Kelvin Grove busway station, situated on the Northern Busway, connecting the site directly to CBD, as well as access to the newly opened Brisbane Metro.

Nearby railway stations to the site include Exhibition adjacent to Brisbane Showgrounds, as well as Fortitude Valley, Roma Street and Bowen Hills. These stations provide access to all six of Queensland Rail's railway lines.

There are also plans for a new railway station closer to the stadium, which would be built on the Exhibition Loop and on Cross River Rail, immediately north of the tunnel portal.

The Inner City Bypass, completed in 2002, allows easy access to South East Queensland's motorway network, connecting drivers beyond the Sunshine Coast on the Bruce Highway and south towards the Gold Coast on the Pacific Motorway.
