= Rocklea railway station =

Railway station in Queensland, Australia

Rocklea
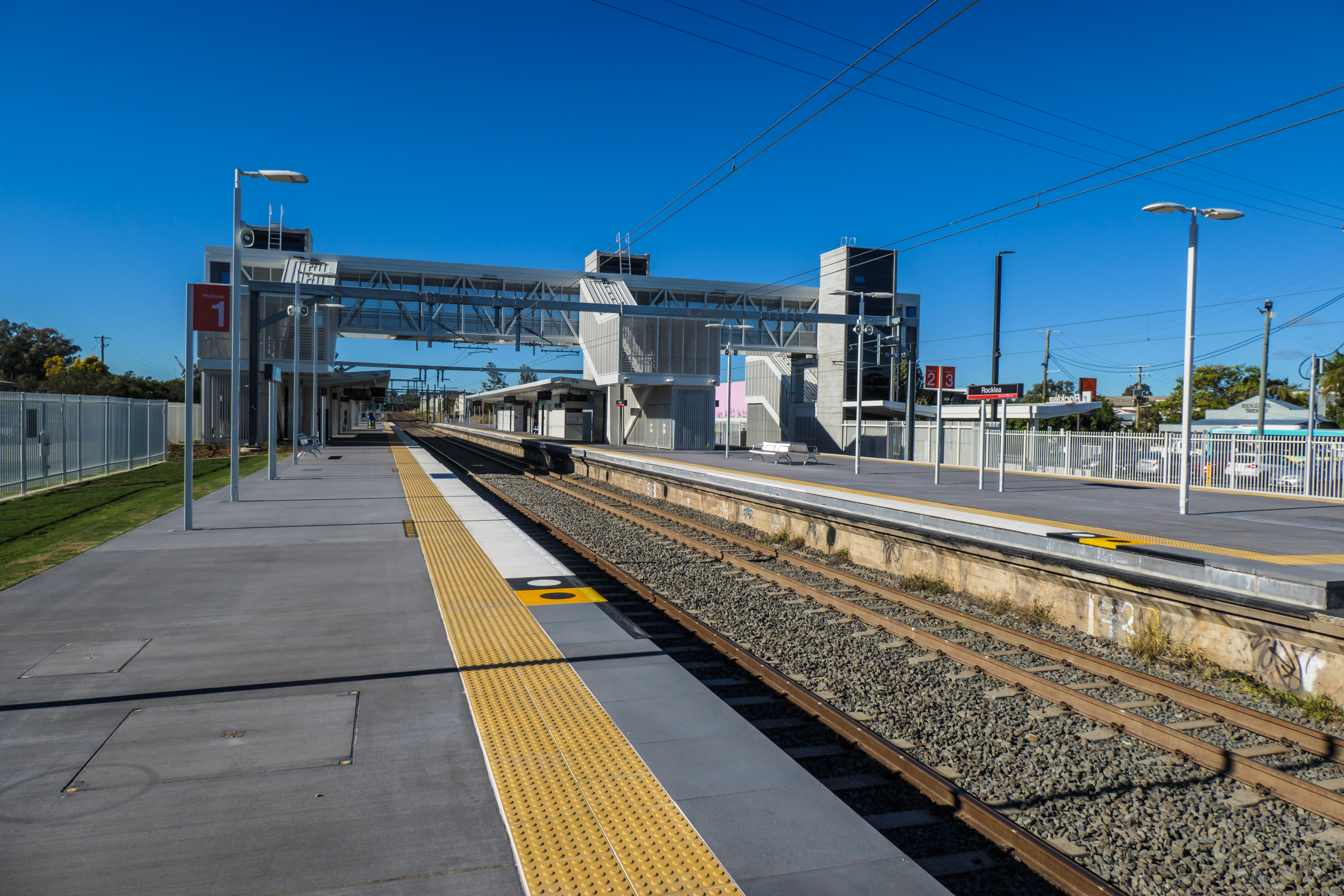
- Southbound view from Platform 1 in July 2024

General information
- Location: Brooke Street, Rocklea
- Coordinates: 27°32′40″S 153°00′50″E
- Owner: Queensland Rail
- Operator: Queensland Rail
- Line: T6 Beenleigh
- Distance: 11.54 kilometres from Central
- Platforms: 3 (1 side, 1 island)
- Tracks: 3

Construction
- Structure type: Ground
- Cycle facilities: Yes

Other information
- Status: Staffed morning peak
- Station code: 600199 (platform 1); 600200 (platform 2)
- Fare zone: Zone 2
- Website: Translink

History
- Opened: 1885; 141 years ago
- Rebuilt: 8 July 2024

Services
Preceding station	Queensland Rail	Following station
Moorooka towards Ferny Grove via Roma Street	T6 Beenleigh line	Salisbury towards Beenleigh
Location

Rocklea is a railway station operated by Queensland Rail on the Beenleigh line. It opened in 1885 and serves the Brisbane suburb of Rocklea. It is a ground level station, featuring one island platform with two faces and one side platform.

In 1996, as part of the construction of the Gold Coast line, the standard gauge line was converted to dual gauge.

In 2022, construction began on the station upgrade as part of the Cross River Rail project, with platforms raised and lifts added to platforms and the carpark entry via Brooke Street. The dual gauge track will also be provided with a platform. The station reopened on 8 July 2024.

== Services ==
Rocklea station is served by all stops Beenleigh line services from Beenleigh, Kuraby and Coopers Plains to Bowen Hills and Ferny Grove.

== Platforms and services ==
Rocklea platform arrangement
Platform	Line	Destination	Notes
1	T6 Beenleigh	Beenleigh	
2	T6 Beenleigh	Roma Street (to Ferny Grove line)	
3	Not used for regular passenger services		
