= Dutton Park railway station =

Railway station in Queensland, Australia

Dutton Park
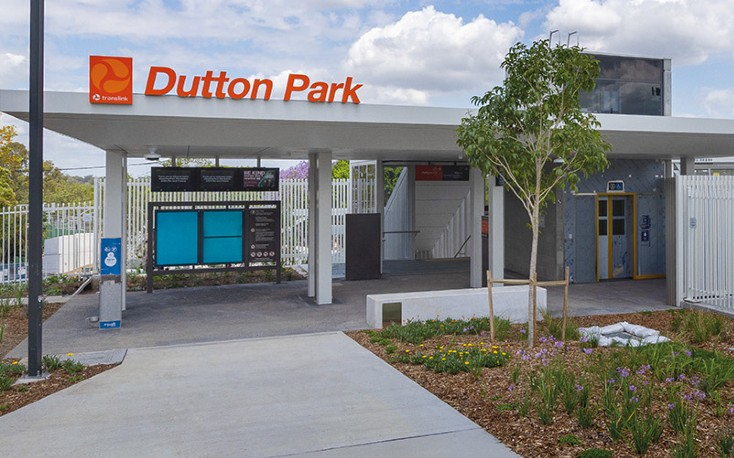
- Dutton Park railway station in October 2024

General information
- Location: Railway Terrace, Dutton Park
- Coordinates: 27°29′59″S 153°01′45″E
- Owner: Queensland Rail
- Operator: Queensland Rail
- Line: T6 Beenleigh
- Distance: 5.93 kilometres from Central
- Platforms: 2 side
- Tracks: 3

Construction
- Structure type: Ground
- Accessible: Yes

Other information
- Station code: 600051 (platform 1); 600193 (platform 2)
- Fare zone: Zone 1
- Website: Queensland Rail

History
- Opened: 1884; 142 years ago
- Rebuilt: 21 October 2024
- Former names: Boggo Junction

Services
Preceding station	Queensland Rail	Following station
Boggo Road towards Ferny Grove	Beenleigh line	Fairfield towards Beenleigh
Location

Dutton Park is a railway station operated by Queensland Rail on the Beenleigh line. It opened in 1884 and serves the Brisbane suburb of Dutton Park. It is a ground level station, featuring two side platforms.

== History ==
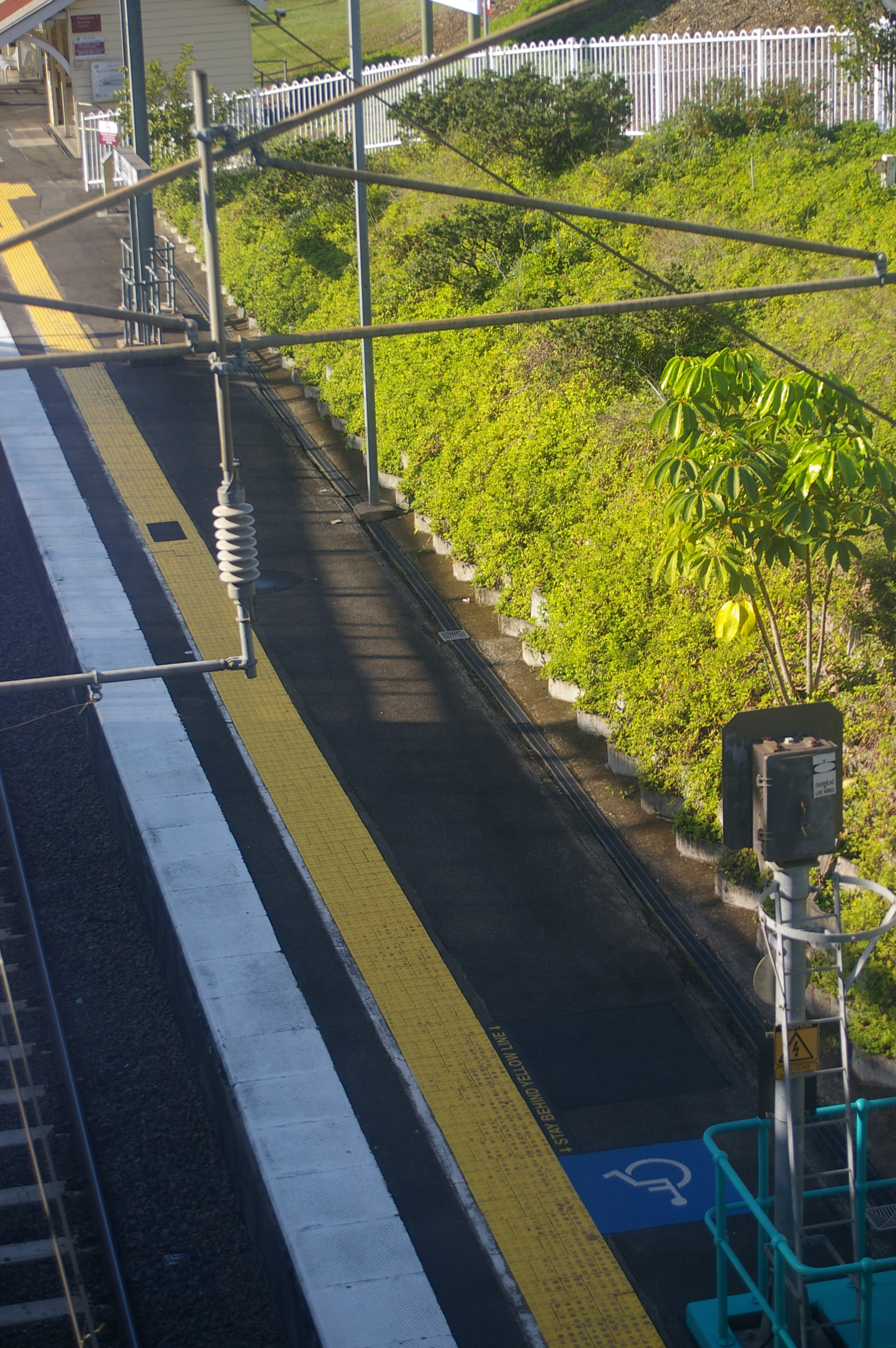
Southbound platform, 2009

Dutton Park station opened in 1884 as Boggo Junction. It was the junction of the Wooloongabba line from 1884 until 1989. The Boggo Junction station is shown on the 1911 estate map for the Dutton Park Estate. The station was renamed Dutton Park three years later in 1914.

In September 1930, the standard gauge New South Wales North Coast line opened to the west of the station. In 1995, as part of the construction of the Gold Coast line, the standard gauge line was converted to dual gauge.

In early 2014, it was announced that Dutton Park would be closed if the Bus & Train Tunnel proceeded, because it would reduce the overall cost of the project, principally by ensuring that no surface-level private residential property acquisition would be required.

In June 2014, it was announced that by slightly increasing the gradient of the line, the project could proceed without the need to demolish Dutton Park station. The project was cancelled in March 2015.

=== Cross River Rail ===
The station is being relocated and receiving a major upgrade as part of Cross River Rail. The new station design has easier access for people using wheelchairs or walking frames, and parents with prams. New entry points to station will be built from Noble Street, Kent Street and Annerley Road. By 1 May 2023 the old Dutton Park station had been completely demolished. The new station is located entirely south of Annerley Road, and features two side-facing platforms on the eastern side of the corridor; something different to anywhere else on the QLD network and a variance to the other stations being built by Cross River Rail, and it re-opened on 21 October 2024.

Pre-2023

Post-2024

== Services ==
Dutton Park station is served by all stops Beenleigh line services from Beenleigh, Kuraby and Coopers Plains to Bowen Hills and Ferny Grove.

Until June 2011, Dutton Park was also served by services to Corinda via the Yeerongpilly-Corinda line.

== Platforms and services ==
Dutton Park platform arrangement
Platform	Line	Destination	Notes
1	T6 Beenleigh	Beenleigh	
2	T6 Beenleigh	Roma Street (to Ferny Grove line)	
