= Moorooka railway station =

Railway station in Queensland, Australia

Moorooka
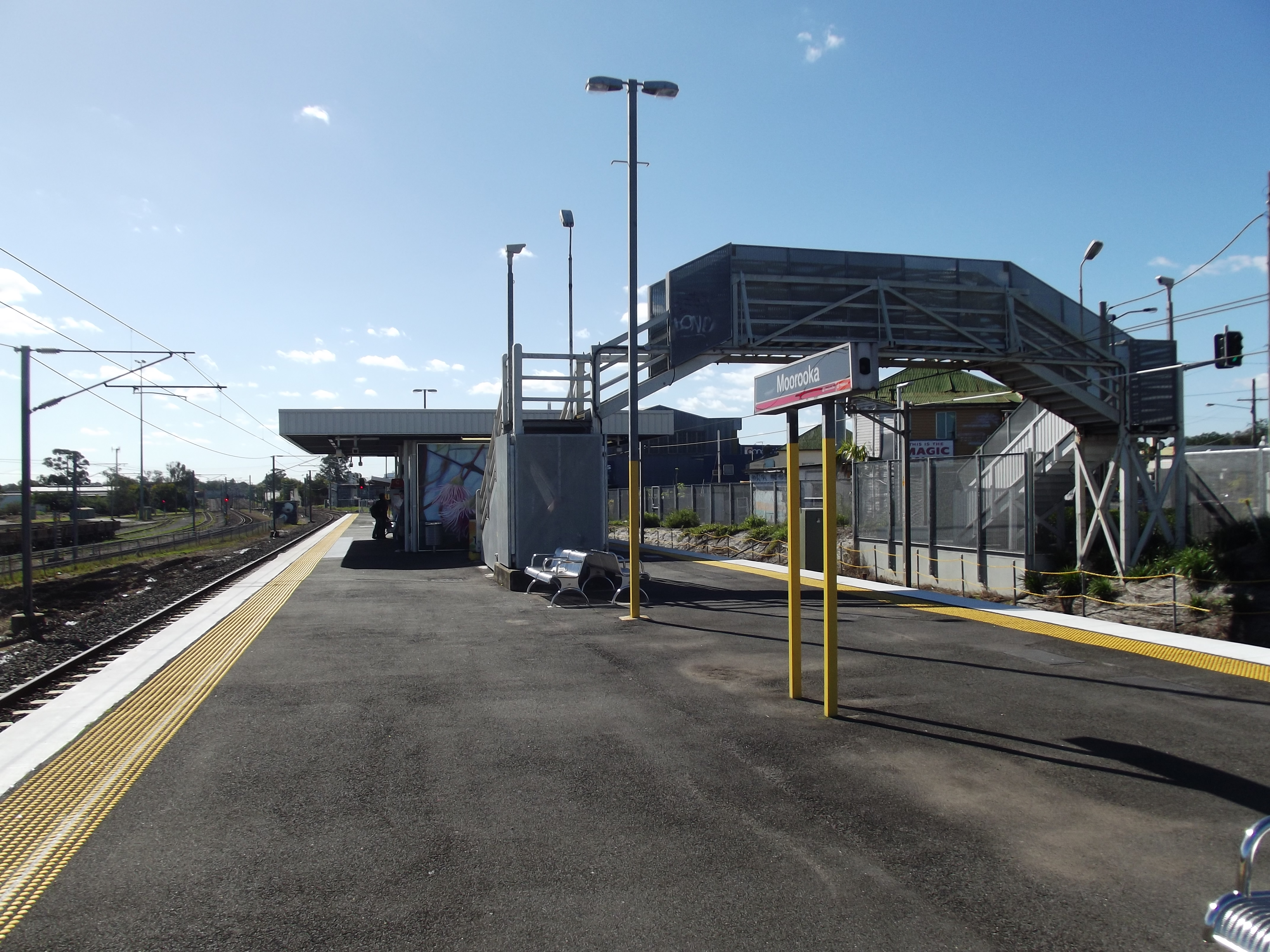
- Northbound view from Platform 1, July 2012

General information
- Location: Ipswich Road, Moorooka
- Coordinates: 27°32′09″S 153°00′50″E
- Owner: Queensland Rail
- Operator: Queensland Rail
- Line: T6 Beenleigh
- Distance: 10.55 kilometres from Central
- Platforms: 2 (1 island)
- Tracks: 3

Construction
- Structure type: Ground
- Parking: 18 bays
- Cycle facilities: Yes

Other information
- Status: Temporarily closed for station upgrade
- Station code: 600197 (platform 1); 600198 (platform 2)
- Fare zone: Zone 2
- Website: Translink

History
- Opened: 1887; 139 years ago

Services
Preceding station	Queensland Rail	Following station
Yeerongpilly towards Ferny Grove via Roma Street	T6 Beenleigh line	Rocklea towards Beenleigh
Location

Moorooka is a railway station operated by Queensland Rail on the Beenleigh line. It opened in 1887 and serves the Brisbane suburb of Moorooka. It is a ground level station, featuring one island platform with two faces.

In 1996, as part of the construction of the Gold Coast line, the standard gauge line was converted to dual gauge.

Moorooka passenger station is opposite the Clapham goods railway station.

Moorooka Station will close on 2 March 2026 for a major accessibility upgrade as part of the Cross River Rail project. The upgrades include a third platform, new station buildings, an upgraded overpass with lifts to all platforms and the station entrance for the station to be fully accessible, and other facilities. It is expected to reopen in late 2027.

== Services ==
Moorooka station is served by all stops Beenleigh line services from Beenleigh, Kuraby and Coopers Plains to Bowen Hills and Ferny Grove.

== Platforms and services ==
Moorooka platform arrangement
Platform	Line	Destination	Notes
1	T6 Beenleigh	Beenleigh	
2	T6 Beenleigh	Roma Street (to Ferny Grove line)	
3	Under construction		

== Diagram ==
- Moorooka station and Clapham goods
