= Merivale Bridge =

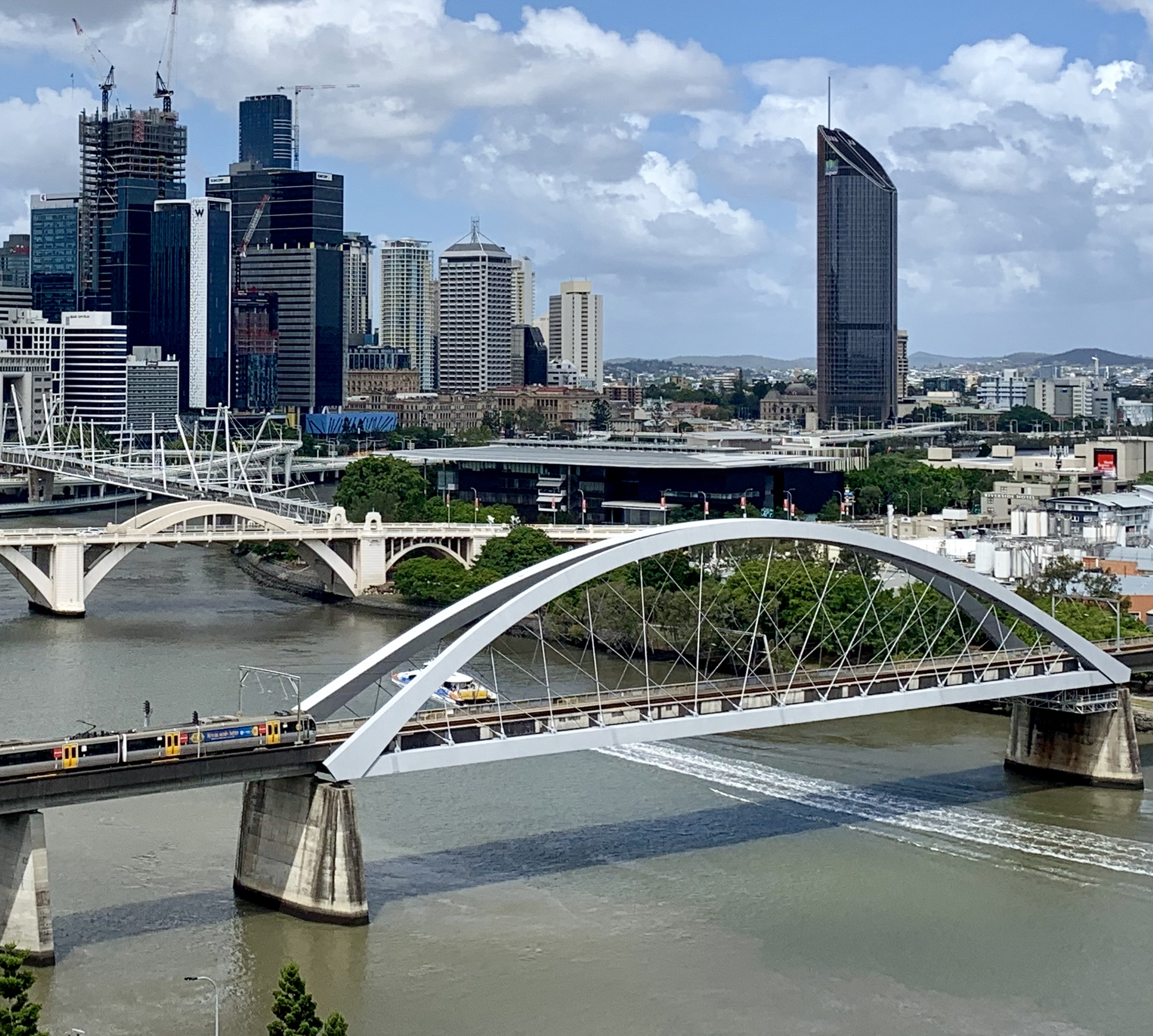
- Merivale Bridge, 2019
- Coordinates: 27.4693°S 153.0130°E
- Carries: Beenleigh, Cleveland and Gold Coast lines
- Crosses: Brisbane River
- Locale: Brisbane, Queensland, Australia

Characteristics
- Design: Through arch
- Total length: 877m
- Longest span: 132m

History
- Designer: Cameron McNamara Pty Ltd
- Construction cost: $21 million
- Opened: 18 November 1978; 47 years ago

Location
- Interactive map of Merivale Bridge

The Merivale Bridge is a double track railway bridge, crossing the Milton Reach of the Brisbane River between the Go Between Bridge and the William Jolly Bridge. Exclusively a railway crossing, it is located between the stations of South Brisbane and Roma Street, linking the northern and southern elements of the Queensland Rail City network. The Merivale Bridge is the only inner-city rail crossing in Brisbane. By 2016 it was expected to be over capacity, leading the Queensland Government to announce the Cross River Rail project.

The Merivale Bridge opened on 18 November 1978 by Premier Joh Bjelke-Petersen. At the opening with 850 guests, the Premier, described the occasion as "the start of the second stage in the history of Queensland Railways".

It formed a more direct route into the city for Brisbane's southern system suburban trains than the existing route via Corinda. Since 1986 it also has carried the standard gauge line from New South Wales. It was designed by Cameron McNamara Pty Ltd (consulting engineers) and was fabricated and erected by Transfield.

The bridge has been recognised with a number of awards. In 1980 it was named the most outstanding engineering project from the Association of Consulting Engineers of Australia. Judges appreciated the combination of aesthetics and functionality. It also won the 1979 Steel Award.

== History ==
It had taken almost a century to get Brisbane's north and south rail networks joined by a bridge over the Brisbane River. As far back as 1885, the then Engineer-in-Chief for the Southern Division Railways arranged for the trial rail survey being done in South Brisbane to be extended across the river to the main western line near Countess Street.

In 1889, he arranged to have levels taken for alternative routes to Roma Street tunnel via Herschel Street, and to Central station via a direct route between Turbot and Ann Streets. The Herschel Street route was recommended for adoption, and plans subsequently prepared. However the government decided not to proceed and requested an alternative survey, but that too was held over.

Worried at losing trade to central city businesses, the merchants of South Brisbane fought against the bridge. In 1913, the then Premier requested that plans for a direct route through Ann Street to Albert Square (now King George Square) be put in hand. In 1919, the matter was raised again, but after further pressure from antilobbyists, was once more allowed to lapse.

In 1950, the issue was raised in connection with proposals to electrify the Brisbane suburban network. Surveys and plans were finalised in 1954, and in 1955 the State Government announced its decision to proceed with the construction and initiated land resumptions. However, financial constraints again caused a deferment.

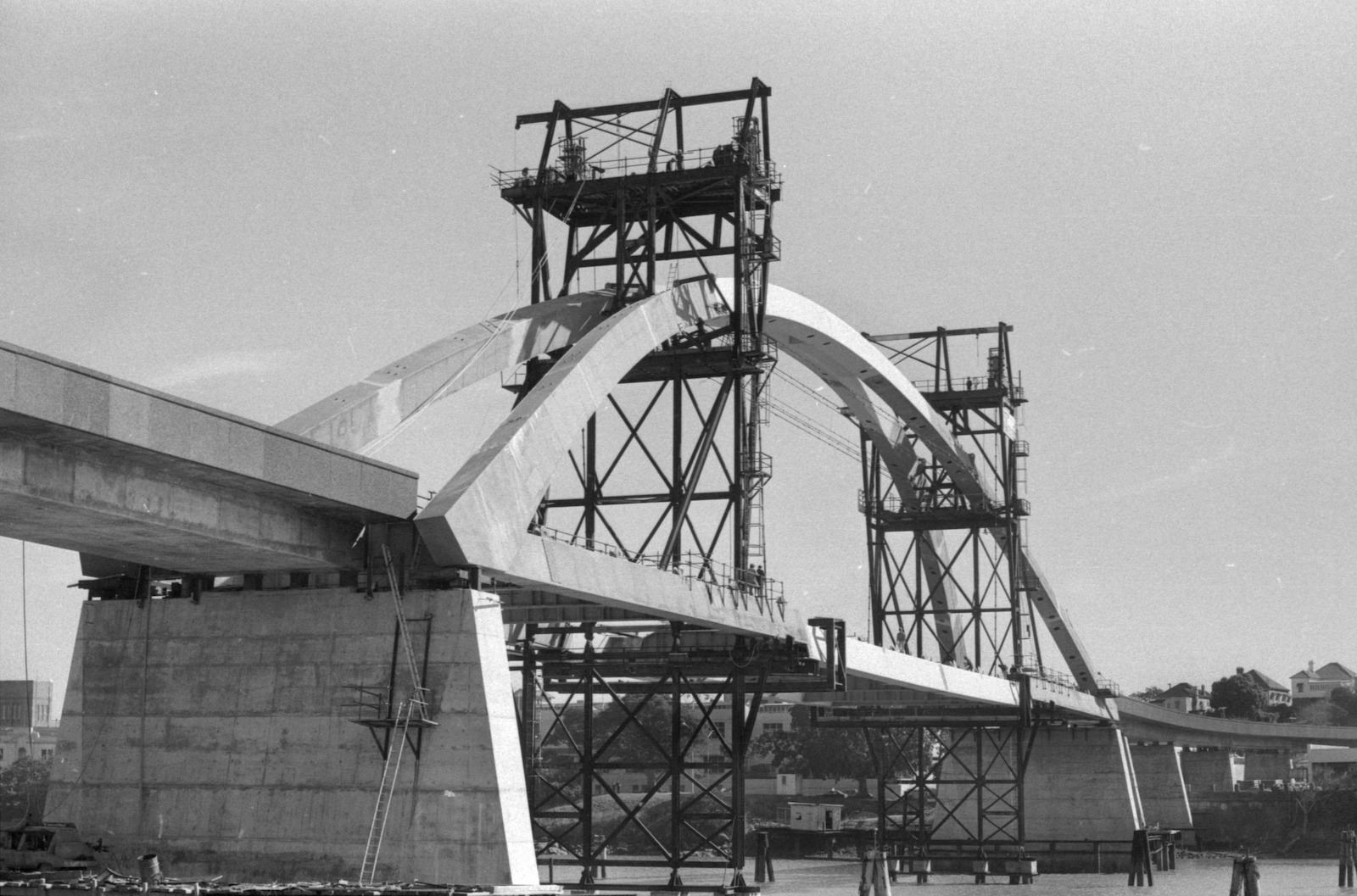
Construction of the Merivale Railway Bridge, Brisbane, 1979

This study was submitted to the Government in 1970. It recommended that the crossing should follow the route, as surveyed in 1890. The Queensland State Cabinet approved the bridge in October 1971. In 1975, a contract was let to Transfield for the construction of the bridge and the line into South Brisbane station. The first pile was driven on 21 August 1975. The bridge took a period of three years and three months to be built.

The Merivale Bridge opened on 18 November 1978 by Premier Joh Bjelke-Petersen. At the opening with 850 guests, the Premier, described the occasion as "the start of the second stage in the history of Queensland Railways". The first train to use the train was Diesel electric locomotive no. 2422.

The bridge was named after Merivale Street in South Brisbane with which the bridge is aligned.

The bridge was refurbished in 2016.

State Library of Queensland holds John Christsen Merivale Bridge collection which contains 370 chronological photographs of the construction of the bridge, as well as documents and research papers relating to the bridge
