= Exhibition railway station, Brisbane =

Railway station in Queensland, Australia

Exhibition
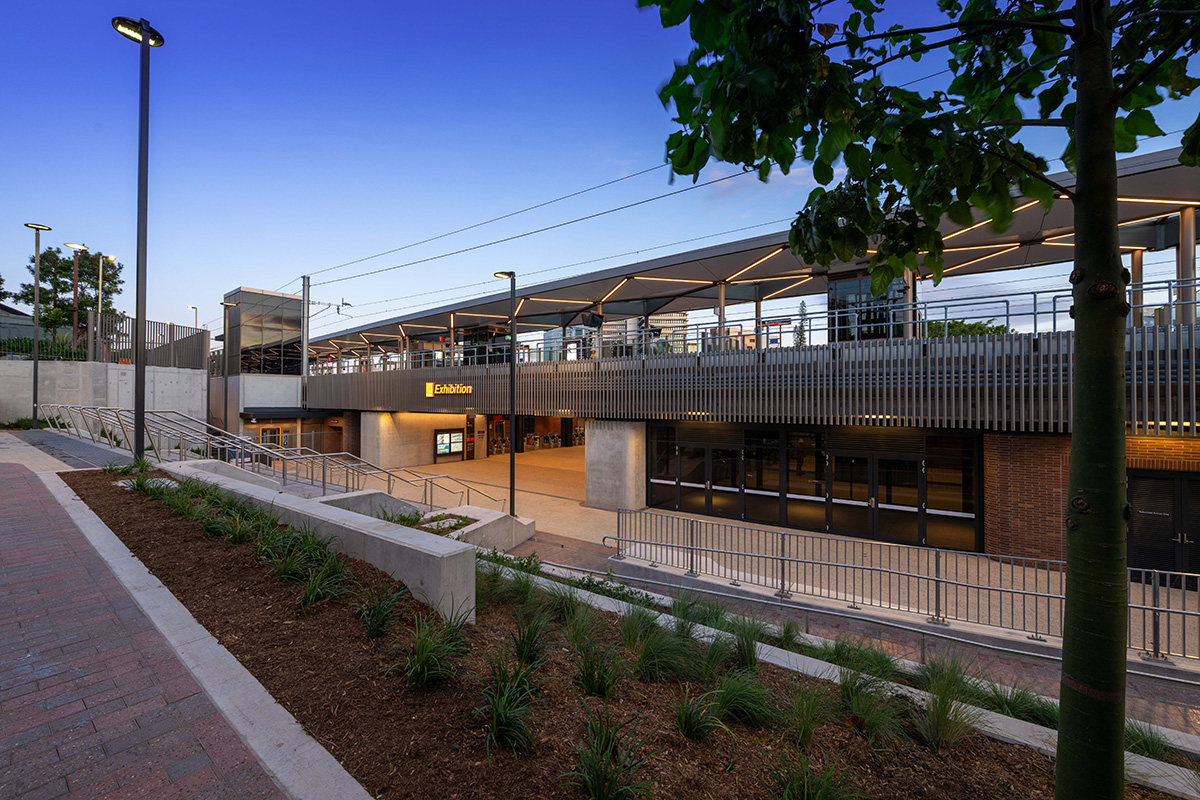
- The station in June 2025 following redevelopment

General information
- Location: O'Connell Terrace, Bowen Hills
- Coordinates: 27°27′01″S 153°01′51″E
- Owner: Queensland Rail
- Operator: Queensland Rail
- Line: Exhibition
- Distance: 3.63 kilometres from Central

Construction
- Structure type: Elevated
- Accessible: Yes

Other information
- Status: Staffed
- Station code: 600001 (platform 1); 600003 (platform 2)
- Fare zone: Zone 1
- Website: Queensland Rail

History
- Opened: 1881; 145 years ago
- Rebuilt: 2020–2025

Services
Preceding station	Queensland Rail	Following station
Fortitude Valley	Bi-directional loop	Roma Street
Location

Exhibition is a railway station operated by Queensland Rail on the Exhibition line. It opened in 1881 and serves the Brisbane Showgrounds in the Brisbane suburb of Bowen Hills. It is an elevated station, featuring one island platform with two faces.

The station is typically only opened during the Ekka show or other special events at the Brisbane Showgrounds; it will be operated year-round following the completion of the Cross River Rail project.

== History ==
Previously an extra ticket surcharge had to be paid to travel to the station. In 2009, Translink CEO Peter Strachan blamed the surcharge on the Royal National Agricultural & Industrial Association not willing to pick up the cost of running the station. The surcharge was removed in 2012.

Because of the historical requirements of the Show, the station was equipped with facilities for dealing with livestock, being a short siding off the old Platform 2 next to the Industrial Pavilion. Since redevelopment from the separate platforms 1, 2 and 3 into the new island platform arrangement this has been removed, along with associated works at the previous Normanby sidings and wagon shop as apart of Cross River Rail. The line passing through the station is regularly used by trains traveling between Roma Street station and Mayne depot, along with freight bypassing the CBD stations.

== Cross River Rail ==
Construction of the Cross River Rail project will see Exhibition Station upgraded for year-round operation and the development of a precinct between the station and the nearby RBWH. The island platform will run for 165 metres in length, allowing it to provide for up to nine-car trains. A viaduct was built to allow for rail passage over the showgrounds.

As of 3 June 2025 the station has re-opened after the major cross river rail upgrades. However the station is only opened for special events until the cross river rail lines have been completed later in the decade.

The tunnel portal for the Cross River Rail line will be located south of the Exhibition Station and the next station for southbound Cross River Rail services will be the underground Cross River Rail platforms at Roma Street.
