= Boggo Road railway station =

Railway station in Queensland, Australia

Boggo Road
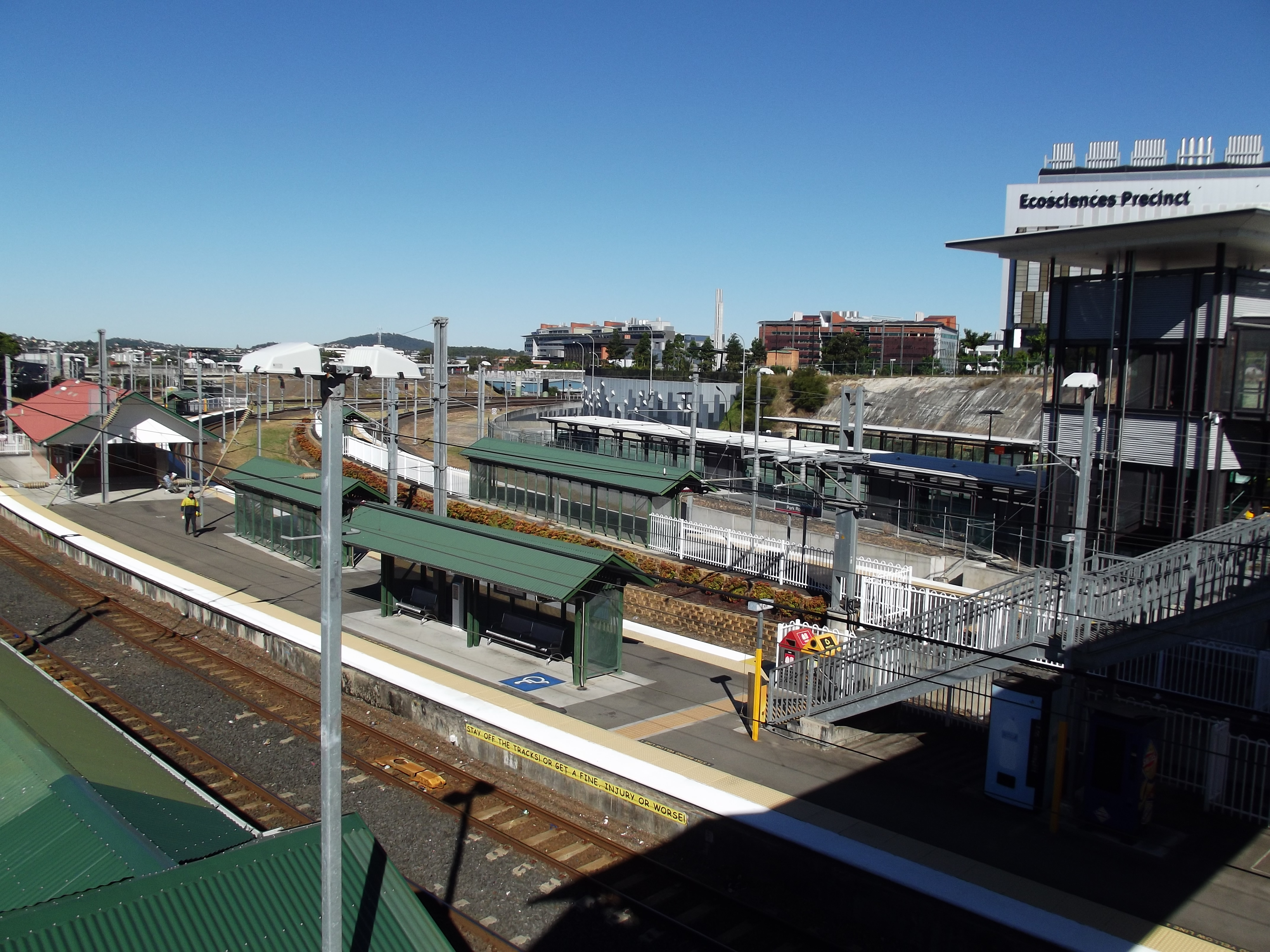
- Southbound view of station platforms in June 2012

General information
- Location: Quarry Street, Dutton Park
- Coordinates: 27.4934°S 153.0302°E
- Elevation: 23 m (75 ft)
- Owner: Queensland Rail
- Operator: Queensland Rail
- Lines: T4 Cleveland; T5 Varsity Lakes; T6 Beenleigh
- Distance: 5.05 kilometres from Central
- Platforms: 4 (2 side, 1 island)
- Tracks: 4
- Connections: Boggo Road busway station

Construction
- Structure type: Ground
- Accessible: Yes

Other information
- Status: Staffed
- Station code: 600085 (platform 1); 600190 (platform 2); 600191 (platform 3); 600192 (platform 4)
- Fare zone: Zone 1
- Website: Translink timetable information

History
- Opened: 21 December 1891; 134 years ago
- Former names: Park Road (1891–2024); Boggo Road/Park Road (2024–2025)

Services
Preceding station	Queensland Rail	Following station
South Bank towards Shorncliffe	Cleveland line	Buranda towards Cleveland
South Bank towards Domestic Airport	Varsity Lakes line	Altandi towards Varsity Lakes
South Bank towards Ferny Grove	Beenleigh line	Dutton Park towards Beenleigh
Location

Boggo Road is a railway station operated by Queensland Rail that serves as the junction for the Beenleigh, Cleveland and Gold Coast lines. It opened in 1891 as Park Road and is located in the Brisbane suburb of Dutton Park. It is a ground level station, featuring two side platforms and one island platform with two faces.

== History ==
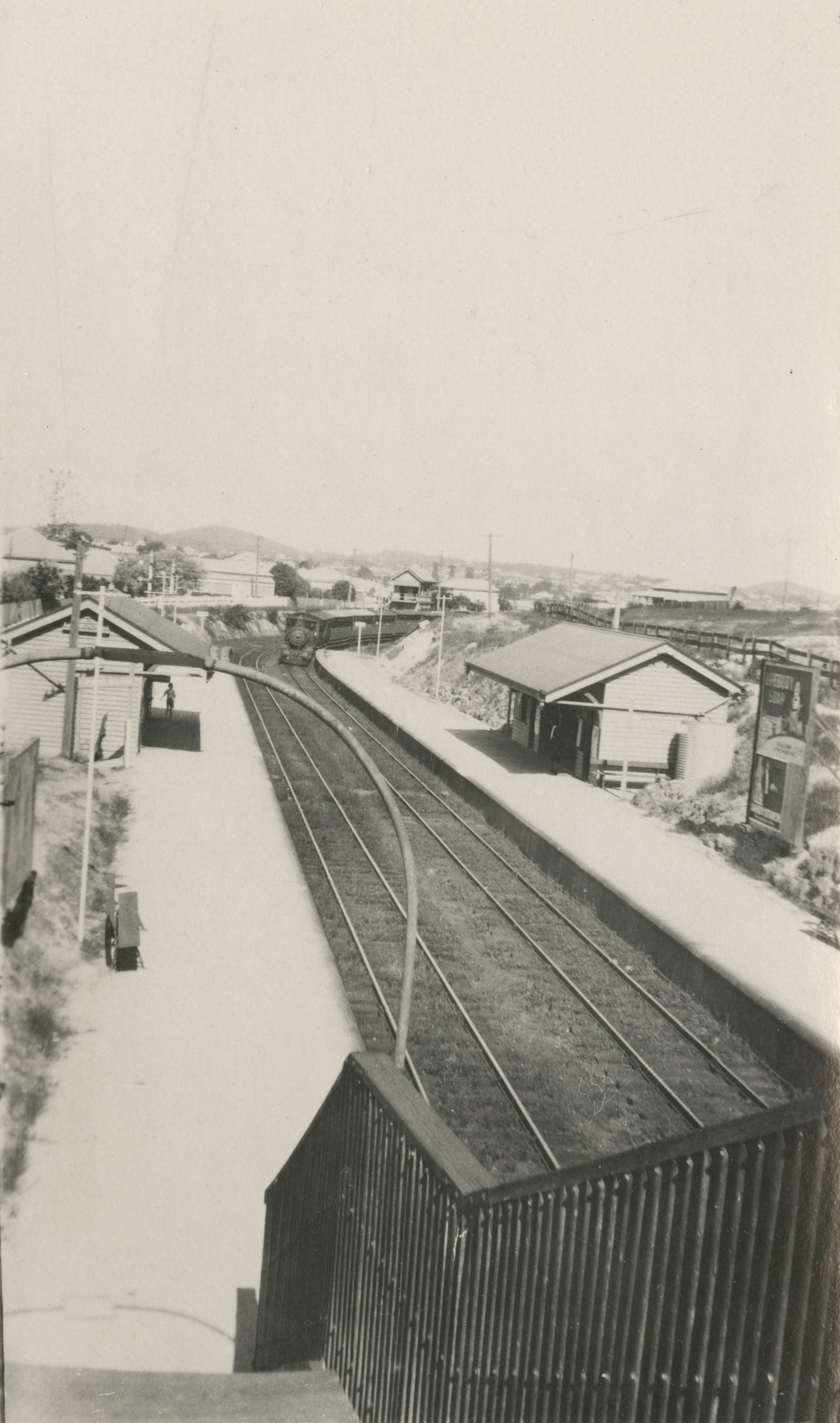
Park Road station circa 1925

In September 1930, the standard gauge NSW North Coast line opened to the west of the station. On 12 November 1942, a wartime siding opened at Park Road, followed by a second on 28 February 1944. After falling out of use in 1945, the yard was reactivated in 1949. In its later years, it was primarily used by paper trains for Queensland Newspapers. It closed again in the early 1990s.

In February 1995, the waiting shed on the up platform was demolished due to being termite infested.

As part of the construction of the Gold Coast line in the mid-1990s, the standard gauge line was converted to dual gauge to allow these services to be segregated from Beenleigh and Cleveland services. In 2000, a project commenced to add a fourth track and platform face between the existing lines, as well as add a platform face to the dual gauge line. The new platform opened on 12 June 2001.

Platform 4 was intended for use by Gold Coast trains but the curvature of the platform was deemed unsafe for commuter train usage. In preparation for sweeping changes across the network on 20 January 2014, the use of platform 4 at the station was trialled from 13 January, before opening for selected Gold Coast services on 20 January.

During a 10-day track closure in December 2021 and January 2022, the station was closed to allow for works to move the Up Beenleigh track 50 metres to the east following the dual gauge unwired flyover, to support the final alignment of Cross River Rail southern portal. The section of track from Dutton Park that allowed access to Platform 2 at the station was also removed, resulting in all trains from the down Beenleigh track servicing Platform 3 at the station.

As part of the Cross River Rail project, a further two underground platforms are to open in 2029.

In August 2024, the station was renamed from Park Road to Boggo Rd / Park Rd ahead of renaming to Boggo Road, which occurred on 21 July 2025. The change was made for consistency with the adjacent Boggo Road busway station. In June 2026, the platforms were renumbered to prepare for the opening of Cross River Rail.

== Platforms and services ==
Boggo Road platform arrangement
Platform	Line	Type	Destination	
1	Under construction for Cross River Rail			
2	Under construction for Cross River Rail			
3	Eastern	Bus	Outbound	M2, 19, 29, 104, 105, 107, 110, 112, 113, 139, 169, 179, 209,
4	Eastern	Bus	Inbound	M2, 19, 29, 104, 105, 107, 110, 112, 113, 139, 169, 179, 209,
5	T4 Cleveland	Rail	Roma Street (to Shorncliffe line)	
5	T5 Varsity Lakes	Rail	Roma Street (to Airport line)	
5	T6 Beenleigh	Rail	Roma Street (to Ferny Grove line)	
6	T6 Beenleigh	Rail	Roma Street (to Ferny Grove line)	
7	T4 Cleveland	Rail	Roma Street (to Shorncliffe line)	
8	T4 Cleveland	Rail	Cleveland	
8	T5 Varsity Lakes	Rail	Varsity Lakes	
8	T6 Beenleigh	Rail	Beenleigh	

Boggo Road station is served by Beenleigh, Cleveland and Gold Coast line services.

== Transport links ==
Adjacent to the station lies Boggo Road busway station that is served by Transport for Brisbane bus services.
