= Salisbury railway station, Brisbane =

Railway station in Queensland, Australia

Salisbury
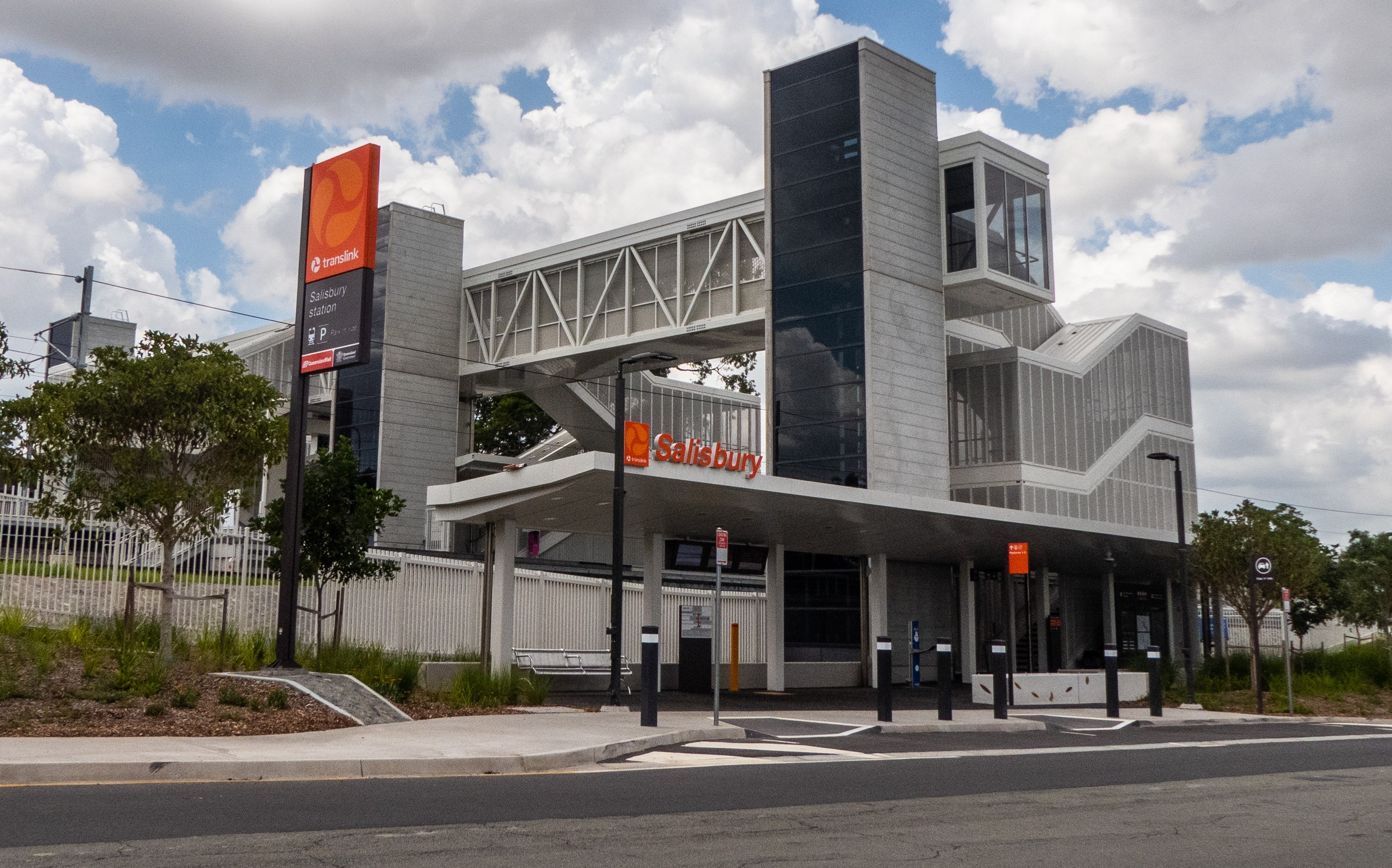
- Dollis Street station entrance in March 2026

General information
- Location: Olivia Avenue, Salisbury
- Coordinates: 27°33′14″S 153°01′22″E
- Owner: Queensland Rail
- Operator: Queensland Rail
- Line: T6 Beenleigh
- Distance: 13.02 kilometres from Central
- Platforms: 2 (1 island)
- Tracks: 3

Construction
- Structure type: Ground
- Parking: 203 bays (4 accessible bays, 12 motorcycle bays)
- Cycle facilities: Yes

Other information
- Status: Staffed part-time
- Station code: 600201 (platform 1); 600202 (platform 2)
- Fare zone: Zone 2
- Website: Translink

History
- Opened: 1885; 141 years ago
- Rebuilt: 2 March 2026

Services
Preceding station	Queensland Rail	Following station
Rocklea towards Ferny Grove via Roma Street	T6 Beenleigh line	Coopers Plains towards Beenleigh
Location

Salisbury is a railway station operated by Queensland Rail on the Beenleigh line. It opened in 1885 and serves the Brisbane suburb of Salisbury. It is a ground level station, featuring one island platform with two faces.

In September 1930, Salisbury became a junction with the opening of the standard gauge NSW North Coast line.

In 1996, as part of the construction of the Gold Coast line, the standard gauge line was converted to dual gauge.

Originally, the station had 49 parking bays across the two existing Park 'n' Ride facilities on Lillian Avenue. In 2021, a new Park 'n' Ride facility located on Lillian Avenue/Dollis Street (western side of the railway) opened, increasing the number of car bays and decreasing parking on local streets. The station had 135 parking bays, plus 12 motorcycle bays. All accessible parking bays are located in the existing car park.

In 2024 as part of the Cross River Rail project, Salisbury station will receive a full accessibility upgrade with major changes being a new third platform, upgraded overpass with lifts, a new station building and more. The station closed on 9 December 2024 and was reopened on 2 March 2026.

A business case has been opened by the Government of Australia and Queensland Government for a proposed passenger rail service from Salisbury to Beaudesert, which would use the existing NSW TrainLink railway from Salisbury to Undullah, then a soon to be built railway from Undullah to Beaudesert.

== Services ==
Salisbury station is served by all stops Beenleigh line services from Beenleigh, Kuraby and Coopers Plains to Bowen Hills and Ferny Grove.

Salisbury station is bypassed by the Gold Coast line which travels towards Varsity Lakes and Brisbane Airport Domestic.

== Platforms and services ==
Salisbury platform arrangement
Platform	Line	Destination	Notes
1	T6 Beenleigh	Beenleigh	
2	T6 Beenleigh	Roma Street (to Ferny Grove line)	
3	Not used for regular passenger services		
