= Coopers Plains railway station =

Railway station in Queensland, Australia

Coopers Plains
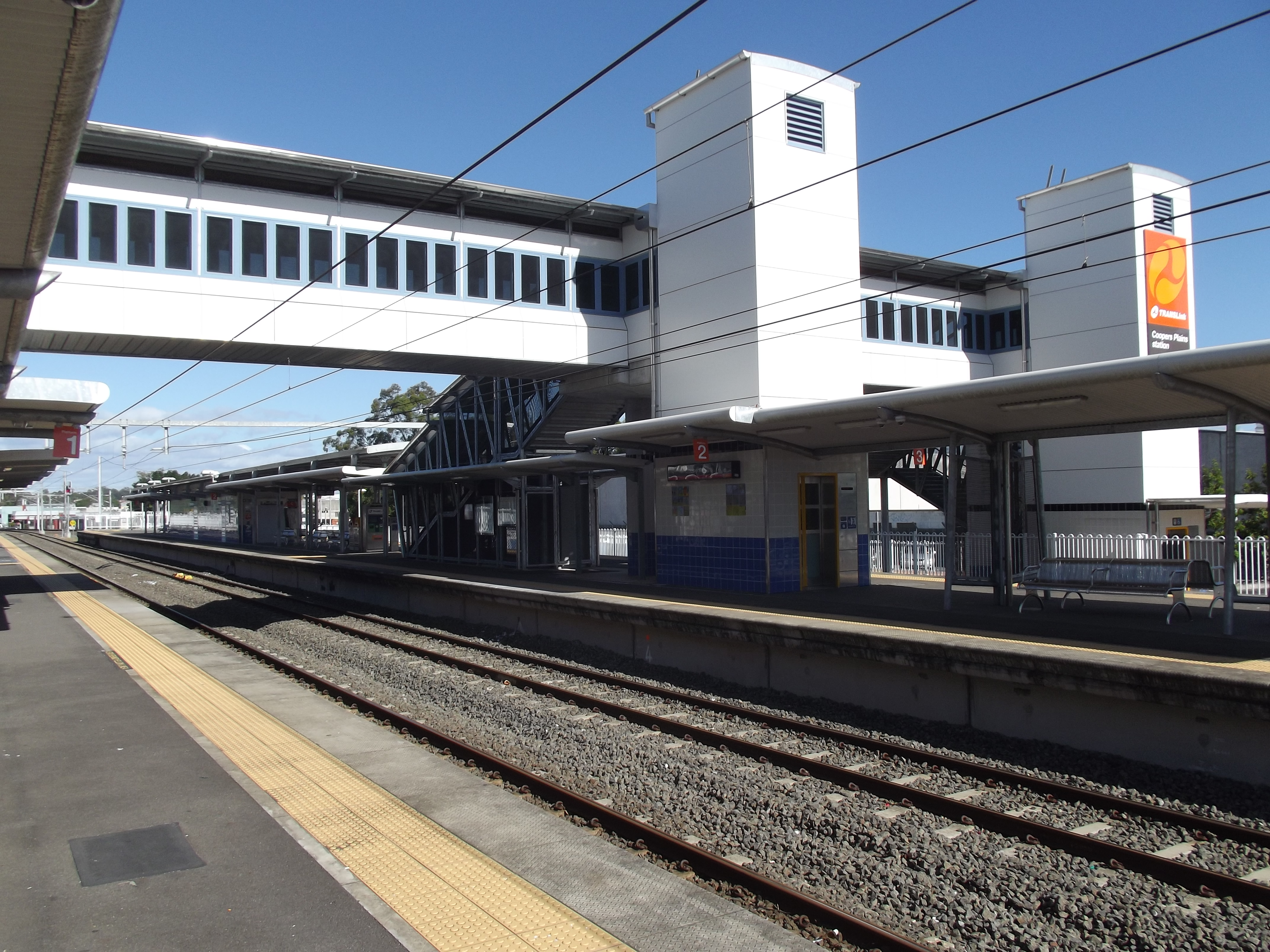
- Southbound view from Platform 1, July 2012

General information
- Location: Henley Street, Coopers Plains
- Coordinates: 27°34′03″S 153°02′09″E
- Owner: Queensland Rail
- Operator: Queensland Rail
- Line: T6 Beenleigh
- Distance: 15.18 kilometres from Central
- Platforms: 3 (1 side, 1 island)
- Tracks: 3

Construction
- Structure type: Ground
- Parking: 144 bays
- Cycle facilities: Yes
- Accessible: Yes

Other information
- Status: Staffed part-time
- Station code: 600203 (platform 1); 600204 (platform 2); 600205 (platform 3)
- Fare zone: Zone 2
- Website: Translink

History
- Opened: 1885; 141 years ago
- Rebuilt: 2008; 18 years ago

Services
Preceding station	Queensland Rail	Following station
Salisbury towards Ferny Grove	Beenleigh line	Banoon towards Beenleigh
Location

Coopers Plains is a railway station operated by Queensland Rail on the Beenleigh line. It opened in 1885 and serves the Brisbane suburb of Coopers Plains. It is a ground level station, featuring one island platform with two faces and one side platform.

== History ==
The station opened in 1885 at the same time as the line. In 2008, an upgrade of the station was completed as part of the Salisbury to Kuraby triplication project. This included converting the western platform to an island, and a new footbridge with lifts.

== Services ==
Coopers Plains station is served by all stops Beenleigh line services from Beenleigh and Kuraby to Bowen Hills and Ferny Grove. Some services terminate at Platform 2.

== Platforms and services ==
Coopers Plains platform arrangement
Platform	Line	Destination	Notes
1	T6 Beenleigh	Beenleigh	
2	T6 Beenleigh	Beenleigh	Evening peak only
2	T6 Beenleigh	Roma Street (to Ferny Grove line)	Weekdays only
3	T6 Beenleigh	Roma Street (to Ferny Grove line)	
