= Camp Mountain rail accident =

1947 railway accident in Australia

Details
- Date: 5 May 1947 (Labour Day); 9:48am
- Location: Camp Mountain, Queensland; 14.95 km (9.29 mi) NW from Brisbane
- Coordinates: 27.39713°S 152.89577°E
- Country: Australia
- Line: Dayboro railway line
- Operator: Queensland Government Railways
- Incident type: Derailment
- Cause: Excessive speed

Statistics
- Trains: 1
- Passengers: 215
- Deaths: 16
- Injured: 38

At approximately 9:48 am AEST, on 5 May 1947, a crowded picnic train derailed on a sharp left-hand curve between Ferny Grove and Camp Mountain stations on the now-closed Dayboro railway line, in the suburb of Camp Mountain approximately 15 km (9.3 mi) northwest of Brisbane, the state capital of Queensland, Australia.

The Camp Mountain train disaster is still the largest loss of life in a rail accident on the Queensland railway network with 16 fatalities, including both the driver and fireman of the train; 38 were injured.

== History and background ==
A branch line was opened from the North Coast railway line at Mayne Junction (north of Bowen Hills station) to Enoggera in 1899, which was extended to Ferny Grove and Samford in 1918, finally reaching Dayboro on 27 September 1920.

By 1908, banana growing in the Samford district had become one of the area's most important industries, and in 1926 and 1927, more bananas were sent from Samford railway station, just down from Camp Mountain, to Sydney and Melbourne than any other station in Queensland. This successful industry existed until the banana bunchy top virus wiped out the crops in the early 1930s. Dairy farming and timber were other industries in the district and out to the end of the line at Dayboro, as well as the quarrying of granite at Camp Mountain, used in the foundations of Brisbane City Hall.

Traffic on the Dayboro line by 1947 was light, with three weekly mixed train services, a daily railmotor service, and another on Thursdays and Saturdays. Most suburban passenger services from Brisbane terminated at Mitchelton, with the occasional through service to Ferny Grove.

== Picnic excursion ==
The train was chartered by the social and recreation club for employees of the Department of Trade and Customs, who were travelling to a picnic venue at Closeburn to celebrate the Labour Day public holiday. The special train, service number E91, consisted of a 4-8-0 C17-class steam locomotive, No. 824, and six wooden suburban passenger carriages, Evans Cars numbered 740, 739, 742, 741, 743 and 744. It was one of a number of chartered trains to travel on the line on the day, conveying groups to numerous picnic locations in the scenic country area north-west of Brisbane.

The service departed from Roma Street railway station at 8:50 am, then Central railway station in Brisbane at 8:59 am. It was estimated that the train carried 215 passengers, most of them Customs employees and their families for a family day out consisting of a picnic lunch with dancing and games of cricket.

== Incident ==
After receiving authority from Ferny Grove railway station to enter the section of track to Samford, the train slowly climbed the Samford Range. Especially due to the hilly area, the speed limit on the Dayboro line at the time was 25 miles per hour (40 km/h) on straight sections of track, and 20 mph (32 km/h) through curves.

As the train descended Camp Mountain Knob, it suddenly picked up speed before the first curve, approximately 1.4 km (0.87 mi) after crossing the peak of the Samford Range. Carriages rocked dangerously, causing luggage to fall from overhead racks, lighting fixtures rattled, and women and children began screaming.

I realised something was wrong and yelled out, 'Hold on, here it comes!' Then there was a terrible crash, and we were showered with flying glass and flung all over the compartment.

— Mr J. O'Mara of Bulimba, a survivor who was travelling in the second carriage

The locomotive left the rails on a left-hand curve with a radius of six chains (approximately 120 m (390 ft)) at an estimated speed of 40 mph (64 km/h). The locomotive tipped onto its right side and ploughed into an embankment, the coal tender upended, and water tank set free. The first carriage struck the water tank squarely, with the three leading passenger carriages telescoped into the wreckage; all of the front carriage and the two leading compartments of the second were destroyed, while the leading bogie of the third carriage derailed.

The force of the accident was significant, causing the total length of the engine, coal tender, water tank and first three carriages to compress from 238 ft 5 in (72.67 m), to 134 ft (41 m). Damage to the trailing three carriages was minimal.

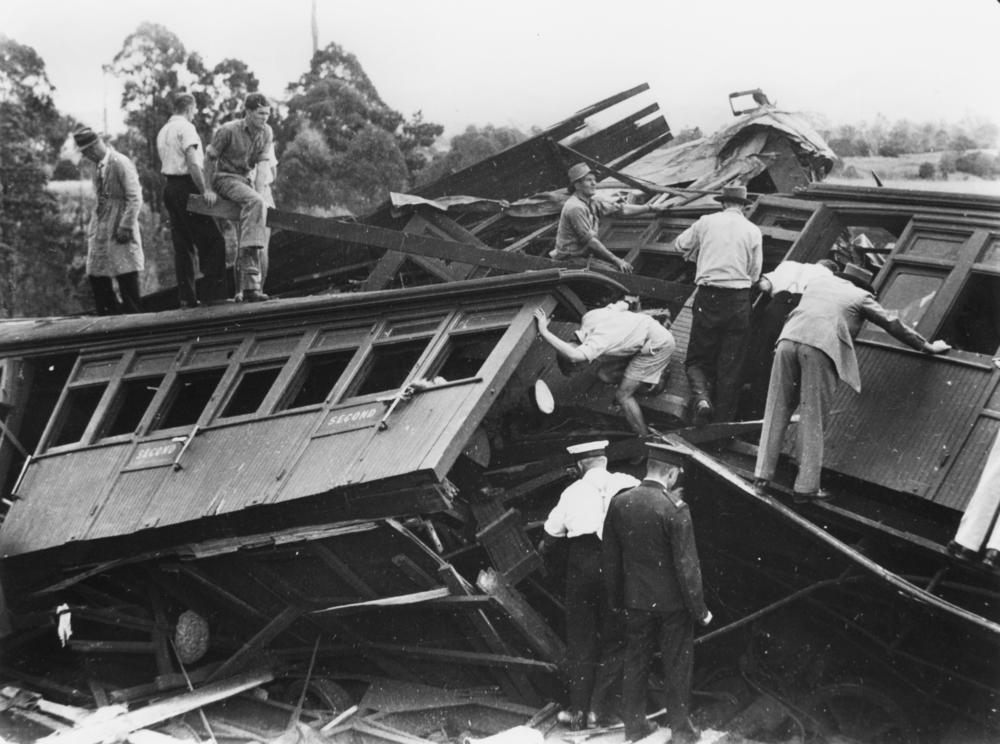
Rescuers inspect the wreckage of the Camp Mountain train disaster.

The guard of the train, Mr GE Evans, was sitting in the rear carriage, looking out of the left window. The force of the crash threw him into the corner of his compartment. He picked himself up after the train stopped, rushed to the top of the cutting beside the line as a vantage point to see what had happened, then returned to the carriage and applied the handbrake. He deemed that the time of the accident was 9:48 am, after looking at his watch displaying 9:50 am and allowing two minutes since the time of impact.

Evans took the first aid kit from the Guard's compartment and passed it to a passenger towards the front of the train. He then took the breakdown kit, rushed back 500 yd (460 m) along the line passed and set three detonators and red flags to warn and stop the expected following train.

The train's whistle sounded constantly after the accident, alerting locals of an incident having occurred. The first call to the headquarters of the Queensland Ambulance Service Transport Brigades was received at 10:08 am, and in 70 minutes 18 cars and 26 men were on the scene.

The fireman of the train, Mr Augustus Knight (known as Gussy by his workmates) from Grange, was killed instantly from being crushed by the wheels of the engine. The driver, Mr Charles Hind, 50, of Woolloongabba was alive, however pinned across the thighs and knees against the train's boiler in the cabin. Scalded with escaping steam, an ambulance officer gave Hind a syringe of the painkiller morphine, which he injected into himself.

Driver Hind was only recently transferred to the Mayne Depot, had not driven trains on the line past Ferny Grove before, and was being tutored by Fireman Knight. A former employee of Queensland Government Railways who was on the following train, Mr Patrick Campbell, spoke to Hind when he was trapped. He asked what had happened, and Hind replied that he did not know the line he was driving on, and therefore would not have been entirely aware of the terrain and conditions.

The driver died in hospital the next day.

Those killed were:

- Francis Kevin Armstrong (passenger)
- Gregory Thomas Brown (9-year old passenger)
- Reginald Burns and Lois Anita Burns (husband and wife, passengers)
- Moira Edith Christiansen (passenger)
- Daphne Cordelia Cochrane (passenger)
- Francis Ernest Delaney (passenger)
- Ida Beatrice Dowd (passenger)
- Howard Clyde Whitehead Hind (driver)
- Michael John Kearney (passenger, 12-year-old student at St Laurence's College)
- William Patrick Kitchen, Olive Irene Kitchen, and Trevor Joseph Kitchen (husband, wife, and 9-year-old son, passengers)
- Augustus Charles Knight (fireman)
- Robert Harold McNamara (passenger)
- Frank Aubrey Pitman (passenger)

At 10:00 am on 8 May 1947, memorial services were held at the Roman Catholic Cathedral of St Stephen and St John's Anglican Cathedral in Brisbane. Seven victims of the disaster rest in five Brisbane cemeteries.

== Court inquiry ==
A Court Inquiry was held into the crash, headed by Supreme Court of Queensland Judge, Sir Alan Mansfield, and attended by railway experts, several passengers and local witnesses. The inquiry found that the driver had been rostered to drive a train on a line he had little knowledge of, and was driving the train with excessive speed.

In his findings, Judge Mansfield said:

The only reason which could be discovered for excess speed was that the train was late and the driver was endeavouring to make up time. He must have known that the permissible maximum speed was being exceeded, but he could not have realised that the excessive speed was in any way likely to endanger the train.

— Judge Sir Alan Mansfield

The driver was charged with having the foremost accountability for the excessive speed the train was travelling at, with shared blame directed to both the fireman and guard. The cost of compensation for the deaths and injuries from the accident was £23,554.

== Line closure ==
After the construction of Samford Road over the Samford Range after World War II, traffic on the Dayboro line declined, with a general shift to road transportation. The Dayboro line was closed beyond Ferny Grove in 1955 and the line in the vicinity of the accident site was converted into a sealed rural road, McLean Road South.

== Memorials ==
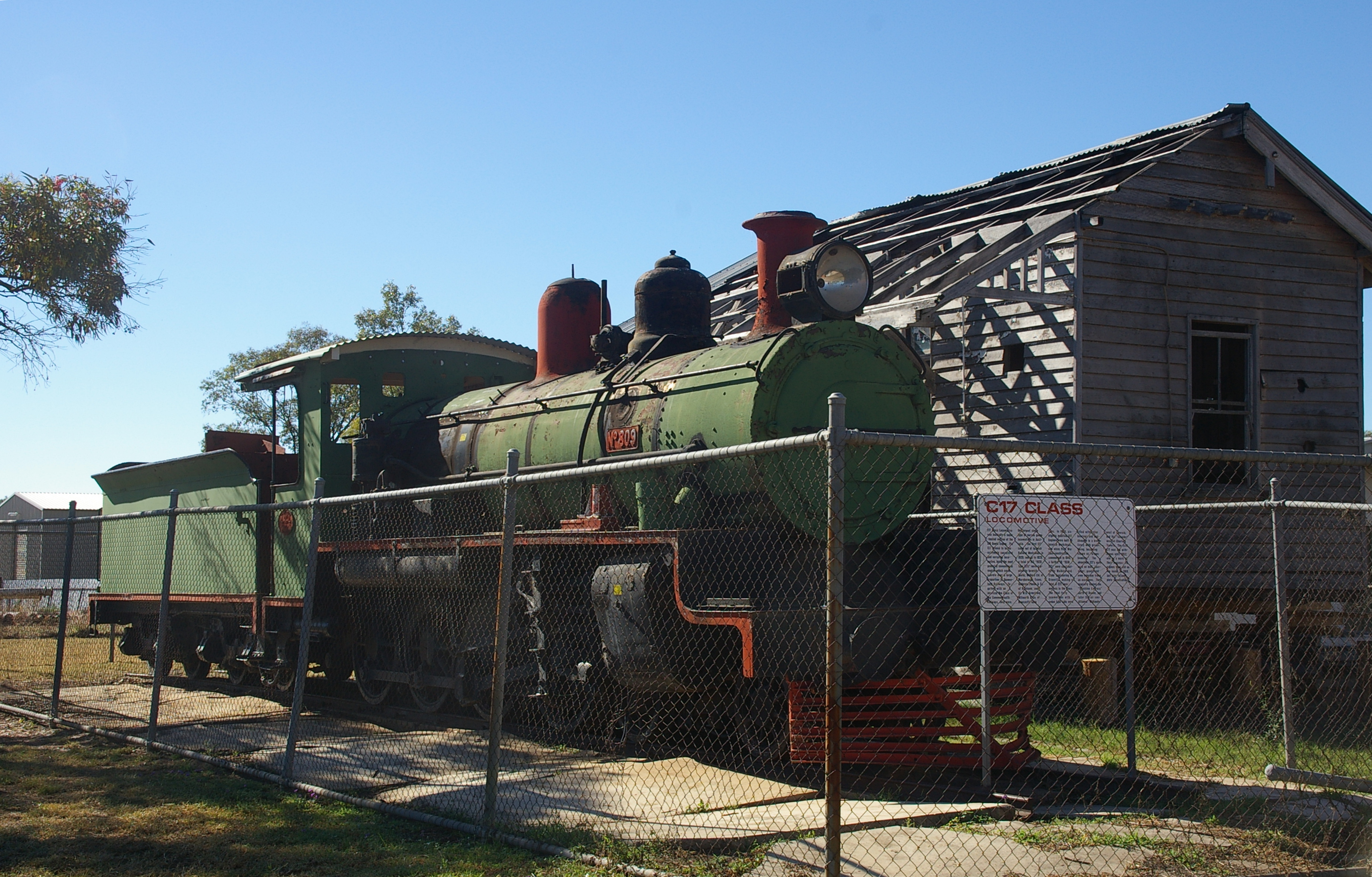
Locomotive No. 824 at Injune, 2008

Locomotive No. 824 from the accident was repaired and placed back into service, working around South East Queensland. In 1958 it was transferred to Toowoomba, and withdrawn from service in May 1967, 20 years after the disaster. At that point, as a donation to the Bungil Shire Council, it was towed to the South-Western Queensland town of Injune, approximately 700 km (430 mi) north-west of Brisbane, at the end of a branch line from Roma that had recently closed on 1 January 1967. It sits behind the town's ambulance station and a high fence, and is listed in a town map as an "historical steam train". The locomotive has incorrect numbers and builder's plates, as the originals were purchased by a railway enthusiast when it was withdrawn from service.

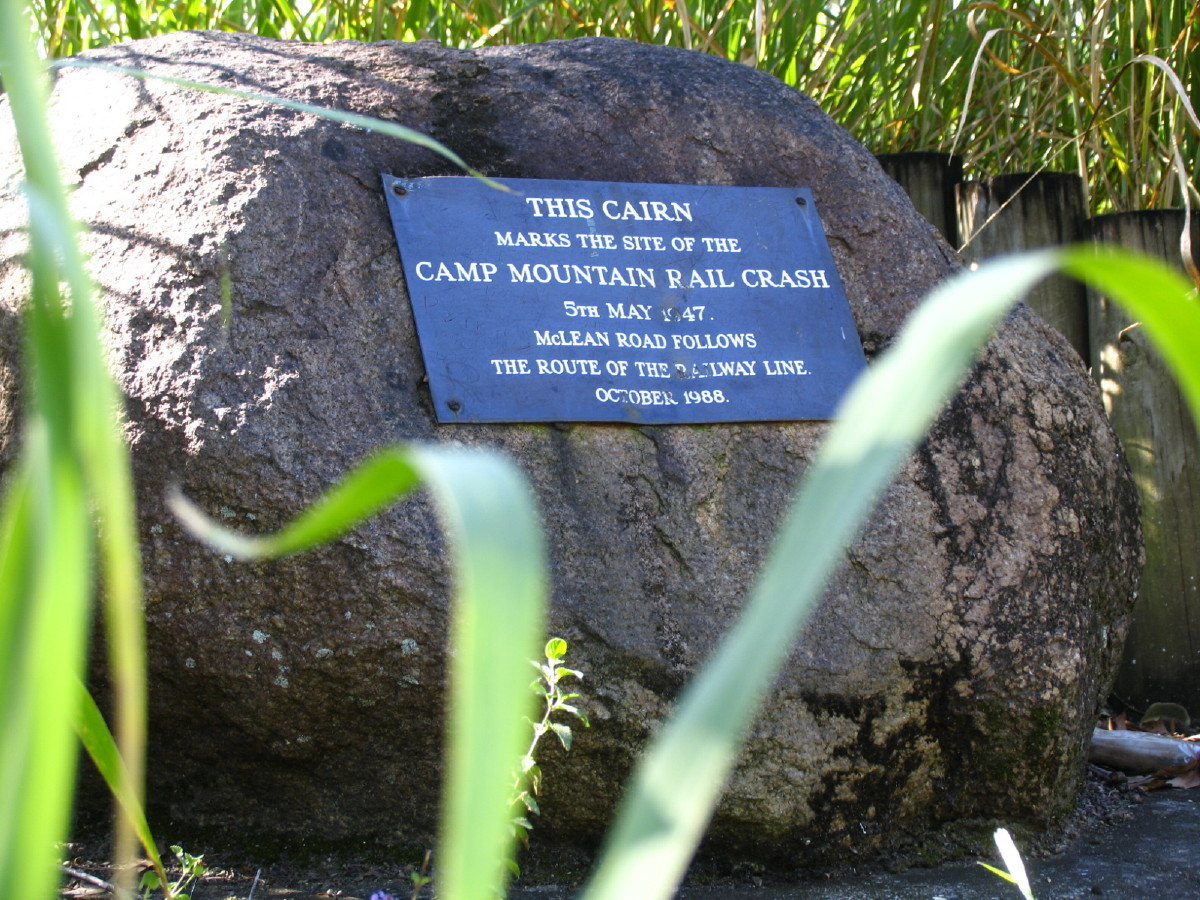
Memorial cairn to commemorate the Camp Mountain train disaster

The accident site is commemorated with a stone cairn and plaque on the northern side of McLean Road South, erected by the Pine Rivers council in 1988. That section of McLean Road South follows the route of the former railway line.
