= Enoggera, Queensland =

Enoggera
- Suburb
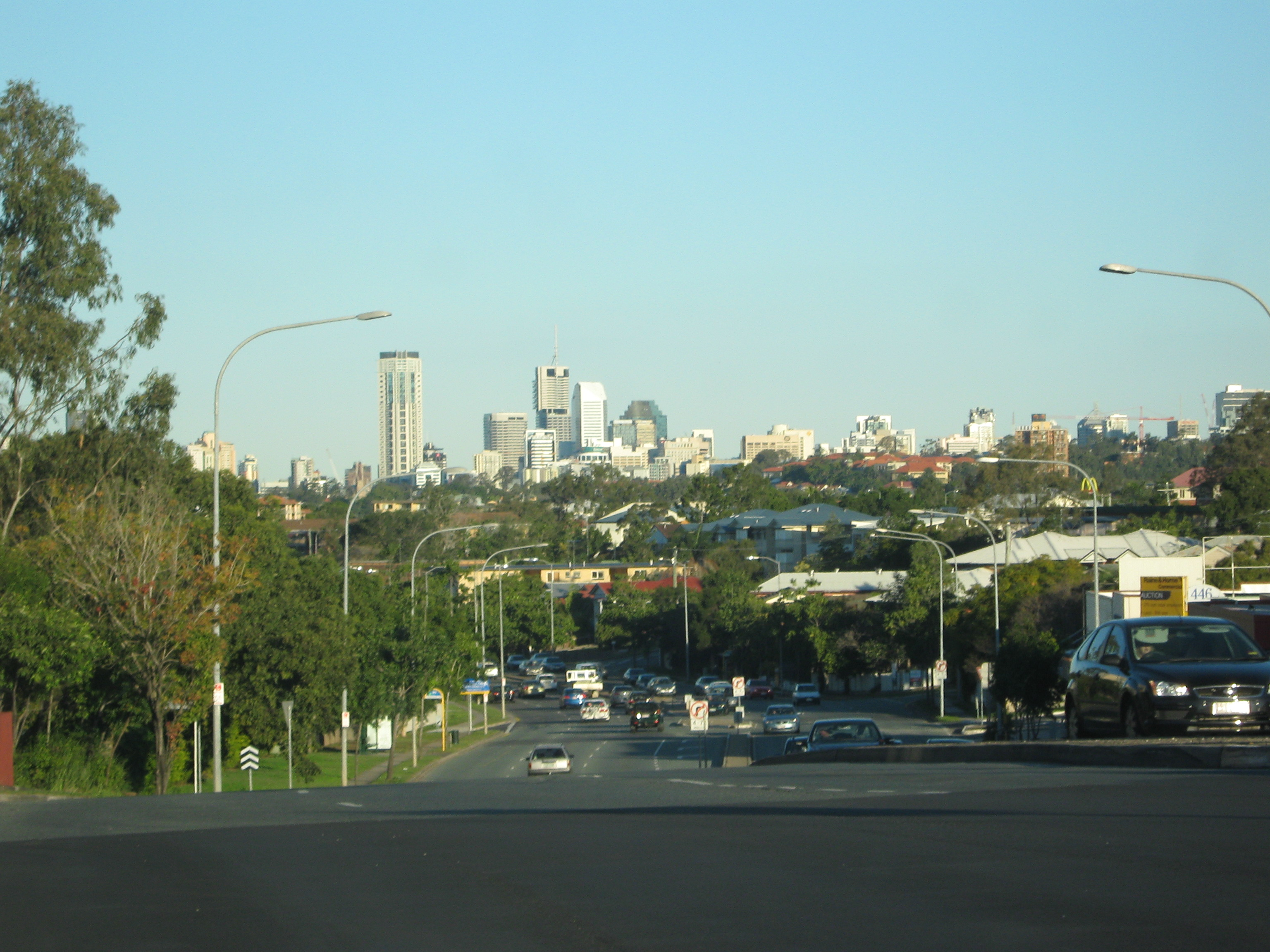
- Enoggera Road, with view of Brisbane CBD.

- Interactive map of Enoggera
- Coordinates: 27.4277°S 152.9783°E
- Country: Australia
- State: Queensland
- City: Brisbane
- LGA: City of Brisbane (Enoggera Ward)
- Location: 6.3 km (3.9 mi) NW of Brisbane CBD

Government
  - State electorates: Ferny Grove; Stafford; Everton
  - Federal divisions: Brisbane; Ryan

Area
  - Total: 7.6 km^{2} (2.9 sq mi)

Population
  - Total: 5,849 (2021 census)
  - Density: 770/km^{2} (1,993/sq mi)
- Time zone: UTC+10:00 (AEST)
- Postcode: 4051
Suburbs around Enoggera
Keperra	Mitchelton; Gaythorne	Everton Park; Stafford
The Gap	Enoggera	Alderley
The Gap	Ashgrove	Ashgrove

Enoggera (/əˈnɒɡrə/ ə-NOG-rə) is a north-western suburb in the City of Brisbane, Queensland, Australia. It is home to the Gallipoli Barracks. In the 2021 census, Enoggera had a population of 5,849 people.

== Geography ==
Enoggera is 7.6 kilometres (4.7 mi) by road north-west of the Brisbane central business district. The west of the suburb is dominated by Enoggera Hill (27.4293°S 152.9601°E) rising to 284 metres (932 ft).

The Ferny Grove railway line passes through the north-east of Enoggera, with the suburb served by the Enoggera railway station (27.4203°S 152.9924°E).

== History ==
=== Aboriginal history ===
The word Enoggera is wrongly spelled, an error made at the Government Lands Office, when the letter u was mistaken for n. It was intended that the name should be recorded as Euogerra, a contraction of the Turrbal phrase youara-ngarea meaning literally "sing-play" or song and dance. It refers to a ceremonial site used for dancing. It is said to have first applied to a site near the mouth of Breakfast Creek. It is possible, however, that the name was independently applied to a site at the place at presently known as Enoggera. They named the area near Bancroft Park "Bu-yu-ba", which means, "straight shin bone", referring to a straight stretch of creek. Enoggera is a corruption of Yowogerra, which in Turrbal means corroboree. Because this area was given a distinct name indicates that it held a significant place in Turbull culture as a camping and corroboree region.

=== 19th century ===
In 1845, John Brennan purchased six hectares of land in Enoggera. Six years later, Thomas Hayes moved to the area and bought thirty-three acres of land. Enoggera initially developed as a farming community with orchards and vineyards.

In the 1860s, the track to the Gympie goldfields passed through Enoggera, and this assisted with development.

Enoggera State School opened on 4 September 1871 on the Great Northern Road (now South Pine Road) with an initial enrolment of 26 students under teacher John Chasly Towell, rising to an average attendance of 43 students by the end of 1917. With a growing population, a new school was opened on 2 September 1916 at the current school location with capacity for 305 students. The original school building on the Great Northern Road was subsequently relocated to the Enoggera Memorial Hall.

Enoggera Baptist Church opened on Samford Road on Sunday 13 October 1872. A new Baptist church opened in Enoggera on Sunday 19 January 1890, with the former church being moved to the rear to be used as a vestry and classrooms.

A Primitive Methodist Church opened on 25 April 1873.

In 1887, the local government Division of Enoggera was proclaimed, bound to north and south by Kedron Brook and Enoggera Creek, and stretching from Alderley to The Gap and beyond the Enoggera Dam.

In 1890, an advertisement was published to auction the Blackheath Estate, being re-subdivisions of part of portion 190, County of Stanley, Parish of Enoggera, by E. Hooker & Son Auctioneers.

In 1890, re-subdivisions 1 to 17 of subdivision 24 of portion 190, County of Stanley, Parish of Enoggera, were advertised for auction by W. J. Hooker.

=== 20th century ===
The land for the Enoggera Army Barracks was acquired in 1910 and opened in the same year. The barracks is still in operation but is now known as Gallipoli Barracks.

St Mary's Anglican Church was dedicated circa 1911. It closed circa 1987.

On Saturday 15 May 1915, there was a stump capping ceremony for a new Presbyterian church at Enoggera. The location was on the corner of Pickering Street and Station Avenue (27.4185°S 152.9859°E), now within Gaythorne. In 1926 the church was extended to create a Sunday school. As part of the merger of many of the Methodist, Presbyterian and Congregational churches into the Uniting Church of Australia in 1977, the church became Gaythorne Uniting Church. However, falling congregation numbers led to a consolidation of Uniting churches in the area, leading to the closure of the former Presbyterian church. Since 2012, it has been used as an early education centre.

In April 1918, Roman Catholic Archbishop James Duhig bought "Shine Hill", consisting of a house with 13 acres (5.3 ha) for £2,150 and engaged architect George Trotter to build a school for 200 students. The foundation stone was laid by Duhig on Sunday 25 August 1918. The school was officially opened and dedicated on Sunday 26 January 1919 by Archbishop of Wellington Francis Redwood, assisted by Duhig.

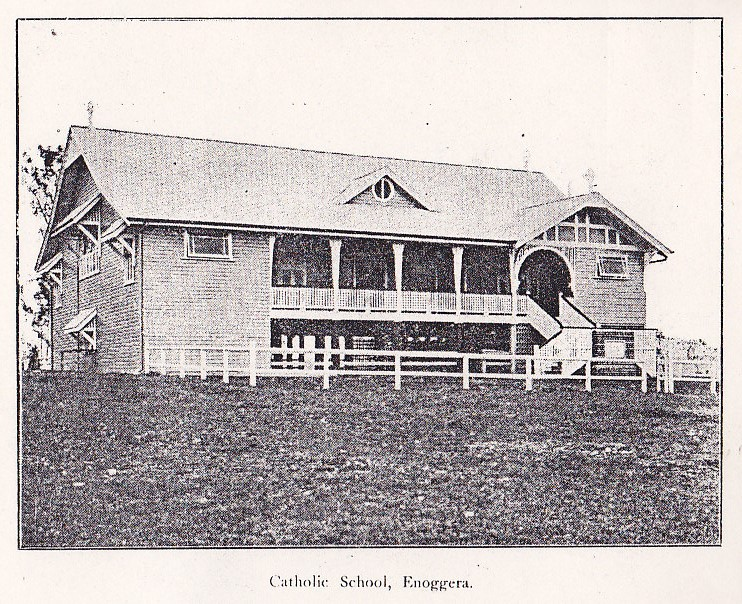
Our Lady of the Assumption School, Enoggera at opening, 1919

Our Lady of the Assumption Catholic School opened on 30 January 1918.

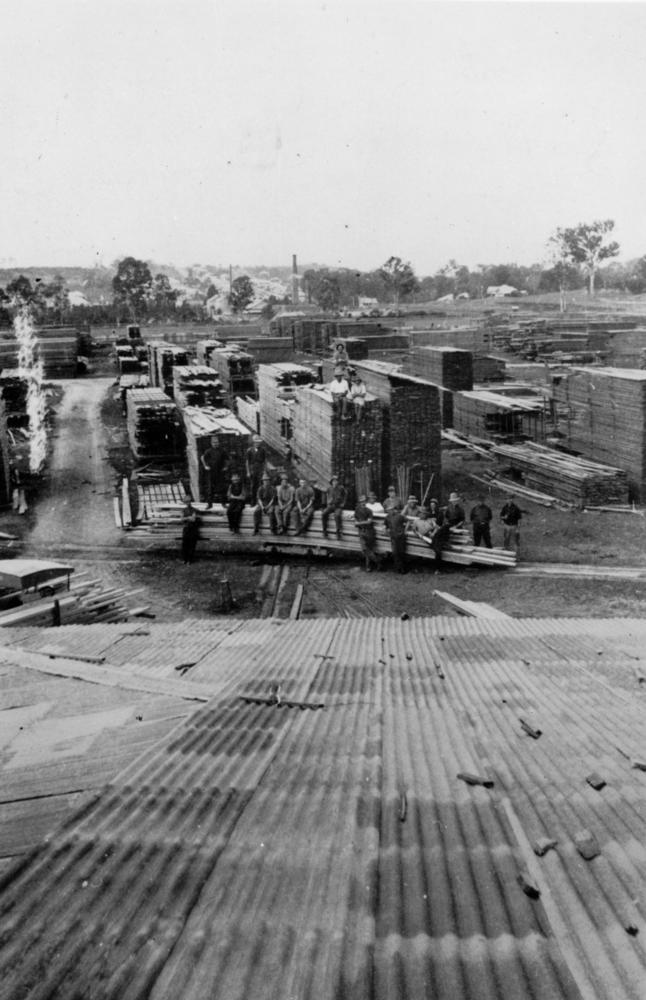
Carrick's Sawmill at Enoggera, c. 1922

In May 1919, subdivided allotments of Rangeview Estate Enoggera were auctioned by Cameron Bros. This area is now within the suburb of Gaythorne. The map advertising the auction states that the Estate was within 5 minutes' walk away from the Rifle Range Railway Station, now known as Gaythorne Station. In April 1921, the land unsold in the previous auction was re-auctioned as "Gaythorne & Rangeview Estates" made up of 53 allotments were advertised to be auctioned by Cameron Bros.

In July 1920, subdivided allotments of Elswick Estate Enoggera were auctioned by Isles, Love, and Co. The map advertising the auction depicts the estate's proximity to the Enoggera Railway Station, and describes the land as having "beautiful grassy park-link ridges" and "lovely foliage trees". The map further states that a water main passes through the estate and that there would be a good prospect of trams and electric light extension.

In 1925, Derby Estate, which was once owned by Tim Corbett, was bordered by Laurel Street, Elkhorn Street, Derby Lane, and Clover Street.

In December 1927, 31 blocks in Abbotsford Estate Enoggera were advertised for auction by Isles, Love & Co. Limited Auctioneers. The map advertising the sale states the land for sale is resubdivisions 1 to 32 & (Easement A) of subdivision 2 of resubdivision 2 of subdivision 3 of portion 406 & of subdivision 2 of portion 407, Enoggera. The map depicts the close proximity of Abbotsford Estate to the Enoggera Railway Station.

In 1949, the tram line from Newmarket was extended along Samford Road to Enoggera. The tram line closed on 2 December 1968.

Marcellin College was opened in 1970 by the Marist Brothers as a boys' school. In 1979, it was decided to amalgamate the Years 11 and 12 boys of Marcellin College with Years 11 and 12 girls from St Benedict's Girls School in Wilston to form Mount Maria College at Mitchelton with the remainder of Marcellin College being renamed Mt Maria Junior College at Enoggera. Primary schooling was then gradually phased out and, by 1992, St Benedict's junior secondary students were fully amalgamated into Mt Maria Junior College. In January 2006 the Mt Maria College at Mitchelton and Mt Maria Junior College at Enoggera were amalgamated as a single school but with two separate campuses (being divided into senior and junior secondary years respectively).

Hillbrook Anglican School opened in 1987 with 90 Year 8 students.

In 1996, the Emmanuel Uniting Church opened.

== Demographics ==
In the 2016 census, Enoggera had a population of 5,157 people, 53.4% were male and 46.6% were female. The median age of the Enoggera population was 30 years of age, 8 years below the Australian median. 78.9% of people were born in Australia compared with the national average of 66.7%. The next most common countries of birth were England 2.8% and New Zealand 2.7%. 87.0% of people spoke only English at home. The most common responses for religion were No Religion 35.5%, Catholic 28.5% and Anglican 11.3%.

In the 2021 census, Enoggera had a population of 5,849 people.

== Heritage listings ==
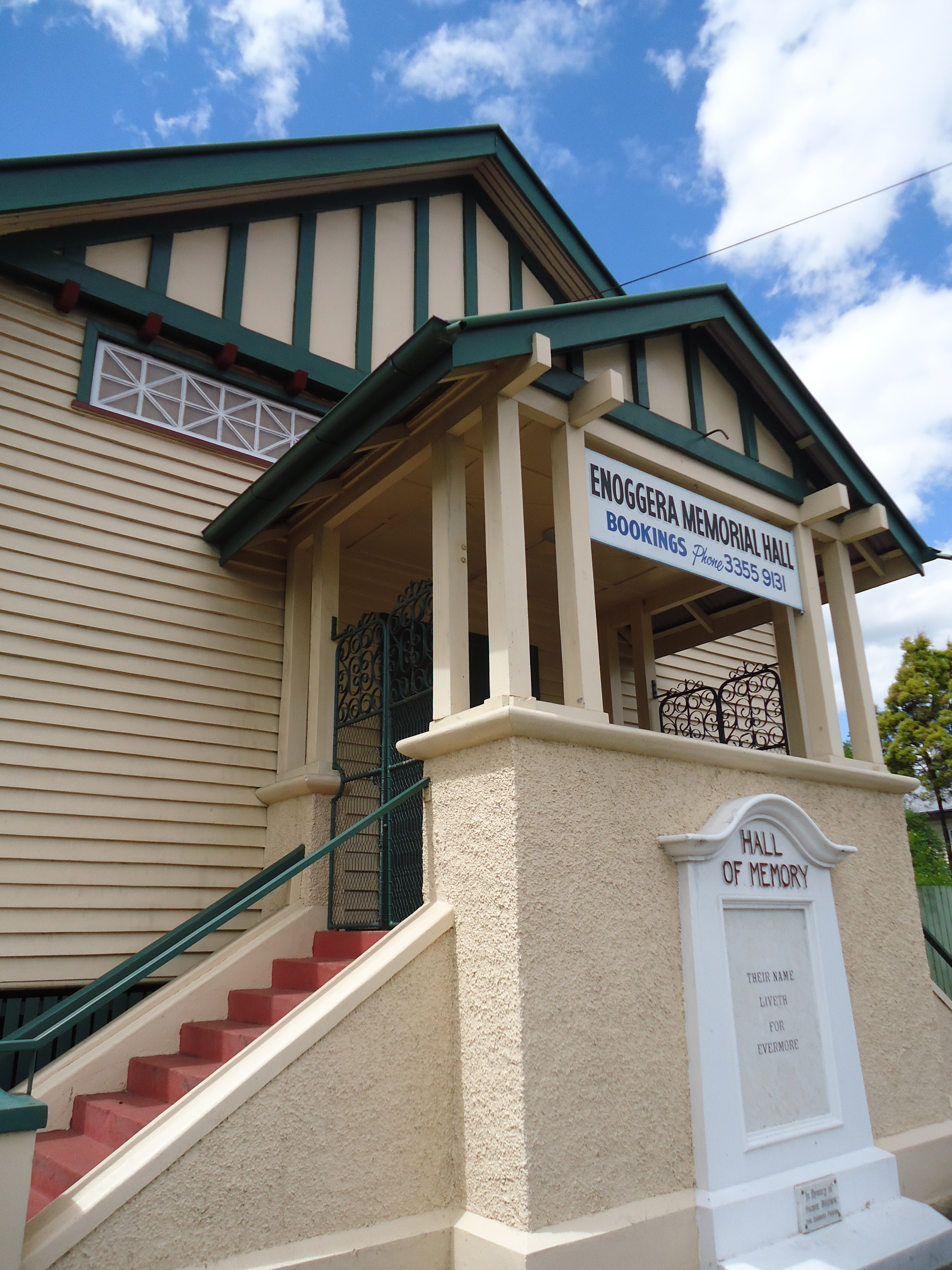
Entrance to Enoggera Memorial Hall, 2011

Enoggera has a number of heritage-listed sites, including:

- Killarney, 9 Laurel Street
- Enoggera State School, 235 South Pine Road:
- Enoggera Memorial Hall, corner of Trundle and Wardell streets
- and a number of sites within the Gallipoli Barracks (formerly the Enogerra Barracks)
  - Enoggera Magazine Complex, Inwood Road
  - School of Musketry, 431 Lloyd Street
  - Small Arms Magazine, Murray Avenue
  - Remount Complex, Wynter Road

== Education ==
Enoggera State School is a government primary (Prep–6) school for boys and girls at 235 South Pine Road (27.4173°S 152.9937°E). In 2018, the school had an enrolment of 284 students with 26 teachers (19 full-time equivalent) and 15 non-teaching staff (10 full-time equivalent).

Our Lady of the Assumption School is a Catholic primary (Prep–6) school for boys and girls at 9 Hurdcotte Street (27.4168°S 152.9903°E). In 2018, the school had an enrolment of 389 students with 31 teachers (25 full-time equivalent) and 25 non-teaching staff (14 full-time equivalent).

Hillbrook Anglican School is a private secondary (7–12) school for boys and girls at 45 Hurdcotte Street (27.4167°S 152.9894°E). In 2018, the school had an enrolment of 711 students with 70 teachers (60 full-time equivalent) and 34 non-teaching staff (30 full-time equivalent). The school is owned and run by the teachers, parents and friends of Hillbrook who choose to become members of Hillbrook Anglican School Limited, from which the school board is elected.

There are no government secondary schools in Enoggera. The nearest government secondary schools are Everton Park State High School in neighbouring Everton Park to the north-east and Mitchelton State High School in neighbouring Mitchelton to the north.

== Amenities ==
Emmanuel Uniting Church is at 249 South Pine Road extending through to Laurel Street (27.4170°S 152.9932°E).

== Transport ==
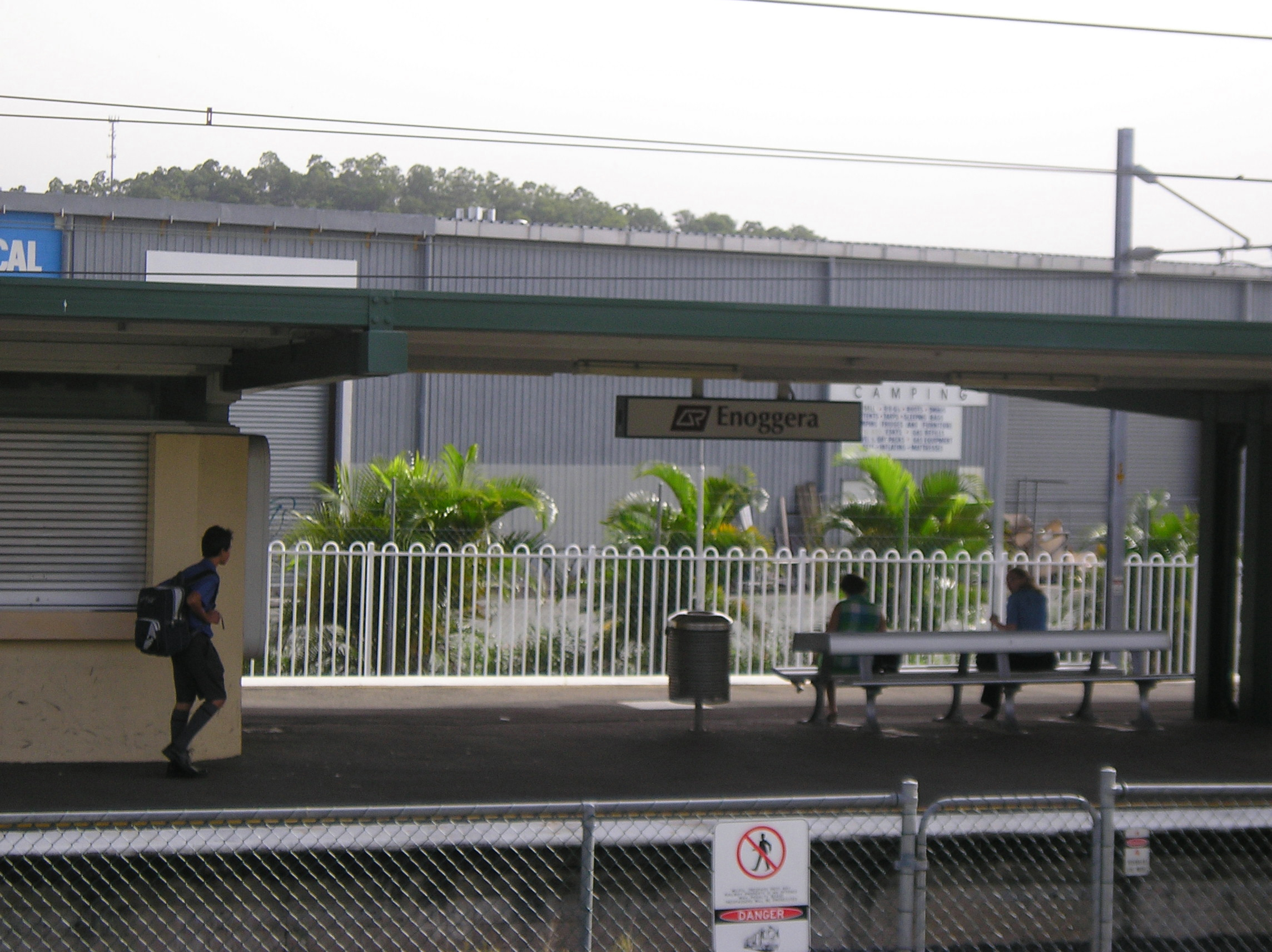
Enoggera railway station

Via train, Gaythorne and Enoggera railway stations provide access to regular Queensland Rail services on the Ferny Grove railway line arranging travel to the Brisbane central business district, Beenleigh and Ferny Grove.

Via bus, Enoggera is serviced by Transport for Brisbane buses, predominantly from the bus-rail interchange at Enoggera railway station and at Wardell Street, which travel to the Brisbane CBD, Chermside, Ashgrove and Indooroopilly.

Via road, Enoggera's main arterials are Samford Road which is the main corridor for motorists travelling to the Brisbane CBD, Mitchelton and Samford, as well as Wardell Street which is the main corridor for motorists travelling to the Inner Western suburbs such as Paddington and Toowong.

== Sport ==
The Brisbane Irish Rugby Football Club "The McBrats" play at Memorial Park.
