= Windsor railway station, Brisbane =

Railway station in Queensland, Australia

Windsor
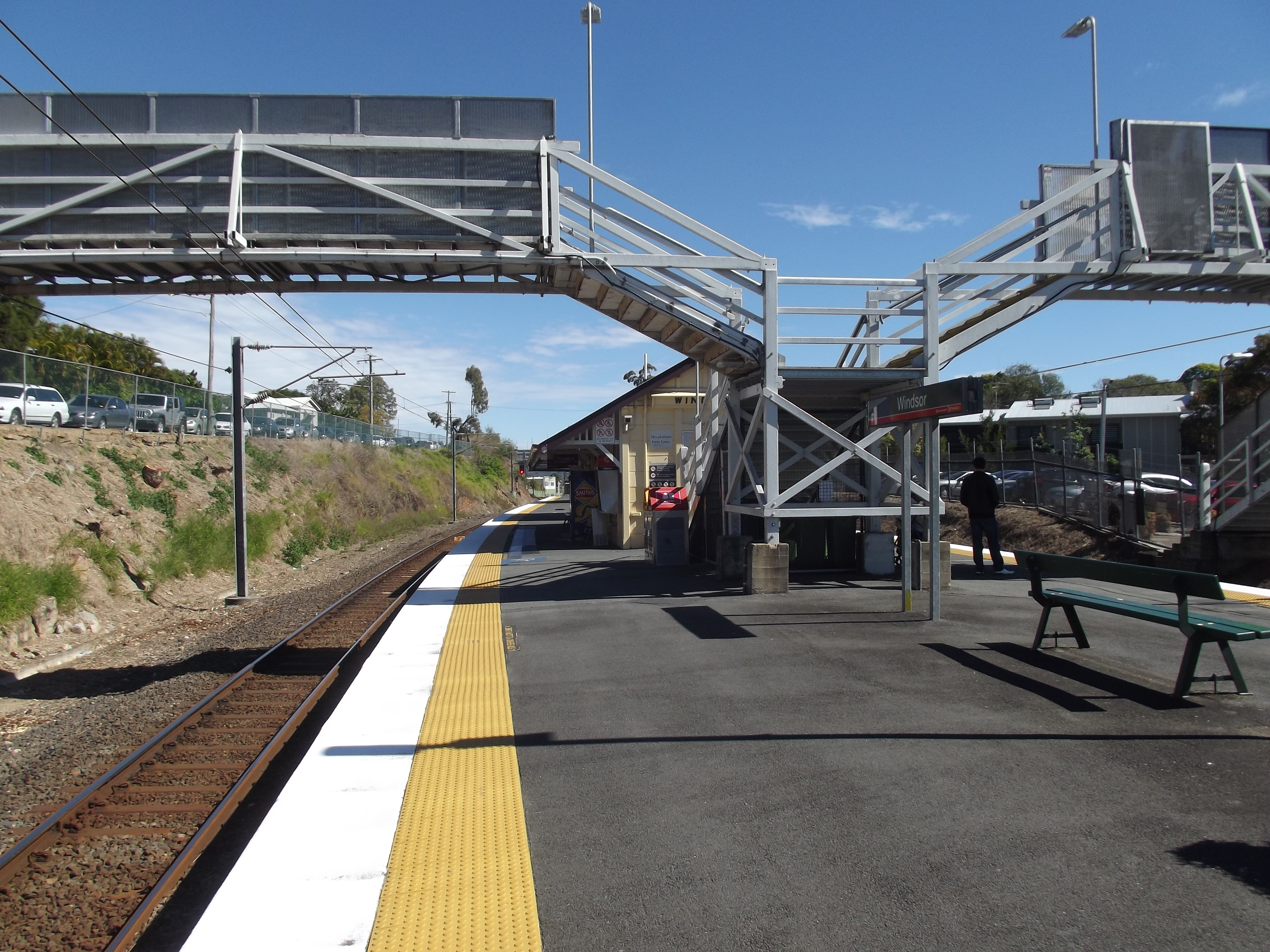
- North-west bound view from the platform in August 2012

General information
- Location: Eildon Road, Windsor
- Coordinates: 27°26′7″S 153°01′45″E
- Owner: Queensland Rail
- Operator: Queensland Rail
- Line: Ferny Grove
- Distance: 4.52 kilometres from Central
- Platforms: 2 (1 island)
- Tracks: 2

Construction
- Structure type: Ground
- Parking: 64 bays
- Cycle facilities: Yes
- Accessible: Assisted

Other information
- Status: Staffed part time
- Station code: 600369 (platform 1); 600370 (platform 2)
- Fare zone: Zone 1
- Website: Queensland Rail

Services
Preceding station	Queensland Rail	Following station
Bowen Hills towards Beenleigh via Roma Street	Ferny Grove line	Wilston towards Ferny Grove
Location

Windsor is a railway station operated by Queensland Rail on the Ferny Grove line. It opened in 1921 and serves the Brisbane suburb of Windsor. It is a ground level station, featuring one island platform with two faces.

== History ==
The Enoggera branch railway line opened on 5 February 1899, but, while the Windsor railway station had been planned, it was not constructed until 1921.

== Services ==
Windsor station is served by all stops Ferny Grove line services from Ferny Grove to Roma Street, Boggo Road (formerly Park Road), Coopers Plains and Beenleigh.

== Platforms and services ==
Windsor platform arrangement
Platform	Line	Destination	Notes
1	Ferny Grove	Roma Street (to Beenleigh line)	
2	Ferny Grove	Ferny Grove	
