= Wilston railway station =

Railway station in Queensland, Australia

Wilston
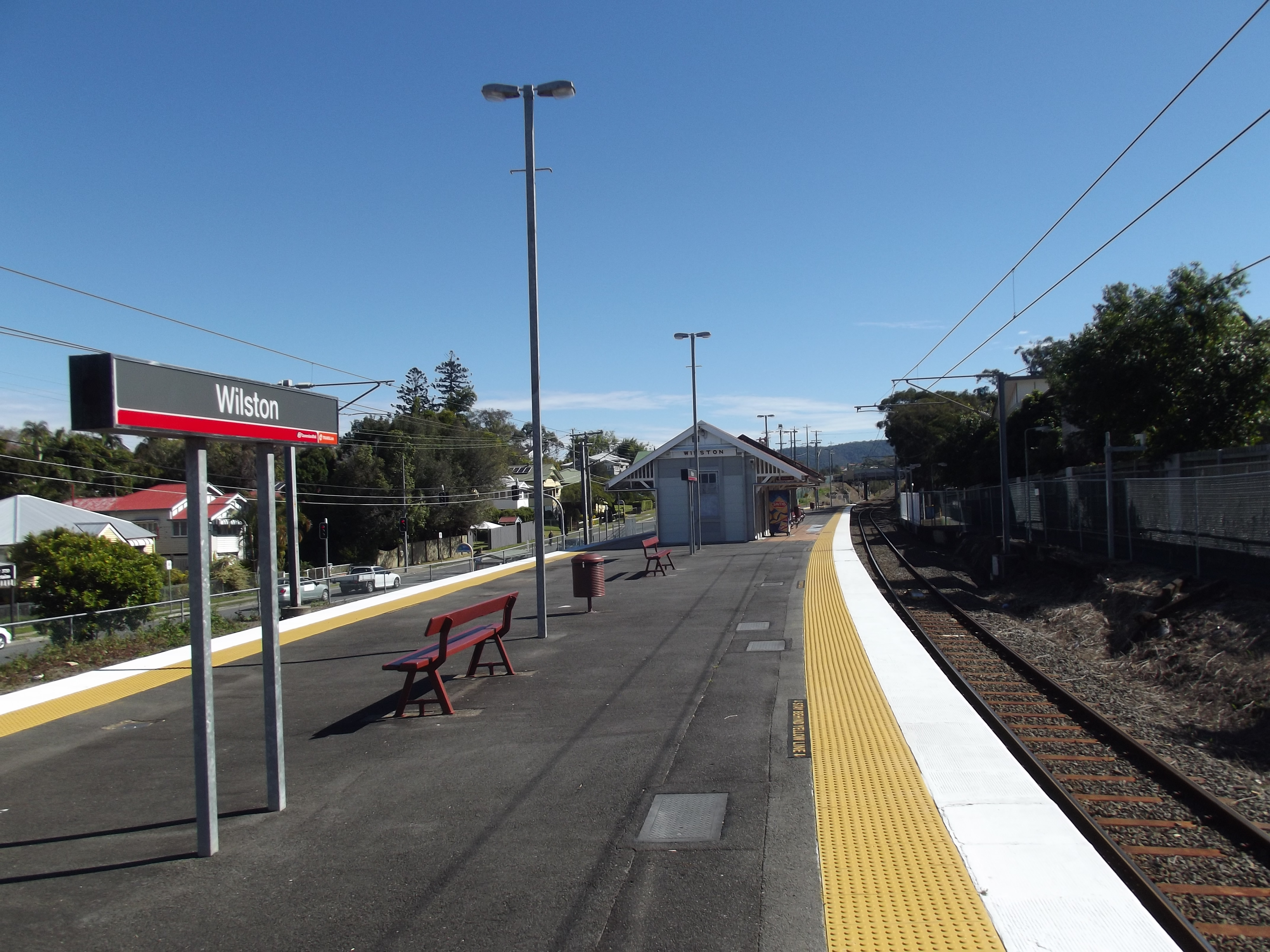
- North-west bound view from the platform in August 2012

General information
- Location: Newmarket Road, Wilston
- Coordinates: 27°26′10″S 153°01′9″E
- Owner: Queensland Rail
- Operator: Queensland Rail
- Line: Ferny Grove
- Distance: 5.50 kilometres from Central
- Platforms: 2 (1 island)
- Tracks: 2

Construction
- Structure type: Ground
- Parking: 64 bays

Other information
- Status: Staffed part time
- Station code: 600371 (platform 1); 600372 (platform 2)
- Fare zone: Zone 1
- Website: Queensland Rail

Services
Preceding station	Queensland Rail	Following station
Windsor towards Beenleigh via Roma Street	Ferny Grove line	Newmarket towards Ferny Grove
Location

Wilston is a railway station operated by Queensland Rail on the Ferny Grove line. It opened in 1899 and serves the Brisbane suburb of Wilston. It is a ground level station, featuring one island platform with two faces.

== Services ==
Wilston station is served by all stops Ferny Grove line services from Ferny Grove to Roma Street, Boggo Road, Coopers Plains and Beenleigh.

== Platforms and services ==
Wilston platform arrangement
Platform	Line	Destination	Notes
1	Ferny Grove	Roma Street (to Beenleigh line)	
2	Ferny Grove	Ferny Grove	
