= Oxford Park railway station =

Railway station in Queensland, Australia

Oxford Park
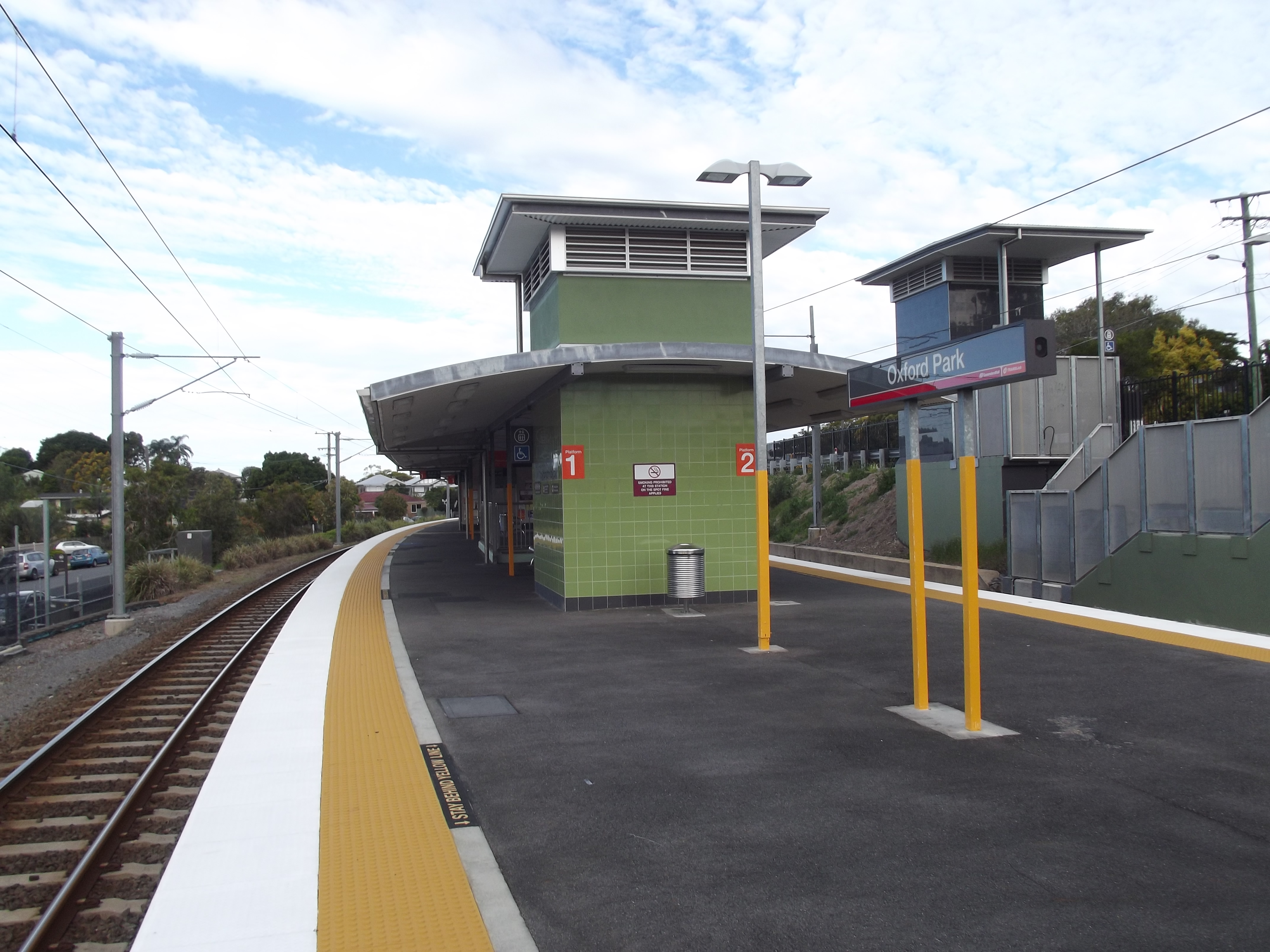
- North-west bound view from the platform in August 2012

General information
- Location: Scanlan Road, Mitchelton
- Coordinates: 27.40431°S 152.96870°E
- Owner: Queensland Rail
- Operator: Queensland Rail
- Line: Ferny Grove
- Distance: 11.97 kilometres from Central
- Platforms: 2 (1 island)
- Tracks: 2

Construction
- Structure type: Ground
- Parking: 74 bays
- Cycle facilities: Yes
- Accessible: Yes

Other information
- Status: Staffed part time
- Station code: 600383 (platform 1); 600384 (platform 2)
- Fare zone: Zone 2
- Website: Queensland Rail

History
- Opened: 1920
- Rebuilt: 2008

Services
Preceding station	Queensland Rail	Following station
Mitchelton towards Beenleigh via Roma Street	Ferny Grove line	Grovely towards Ferny Grove
Location

Oxford Park is a railway station operated by Queensland Rail on the Ferny Grove line. It opened in 1920 and serves the Brisbane suburb of Mitchelton. It is a ground level station, featuring one island platform with two faces.

== History ==
The station's development arose from public demand claiming there was a need for a station between Mitchelton railway station and Grovely railway station. It has been claimed that the precise location chosen was to facilitate the planned construction of the Catholic Church's Redemptorist Monastery.

The station opened in 1920 and was named by the Queensland Railway Department on 9 April 1920. Oxford Park was the name of an adjacent residential subdivision (sold from 1913).

The station was upgraded in 2008 as part of the Mitchelton to Keperra duplication project.

== Services ==
Oxford Park station is served by all stops Ferny Grove line services from Ferny Grove to Roma Street, Boggo Road (formerly known as Park Road), Coopers Plains and Beenleigh.

== Platforms and services ==
Oxford Park platform arrangement
Platform	Line	Destination	Notes
1	Ferny Grove	Roma Street (to Beenleigh line)	
2	Ferny Grove	Ferny Grove	
