= Alderley railway station, Brisbane =

Railway station in Queensland, Australia

Alderley
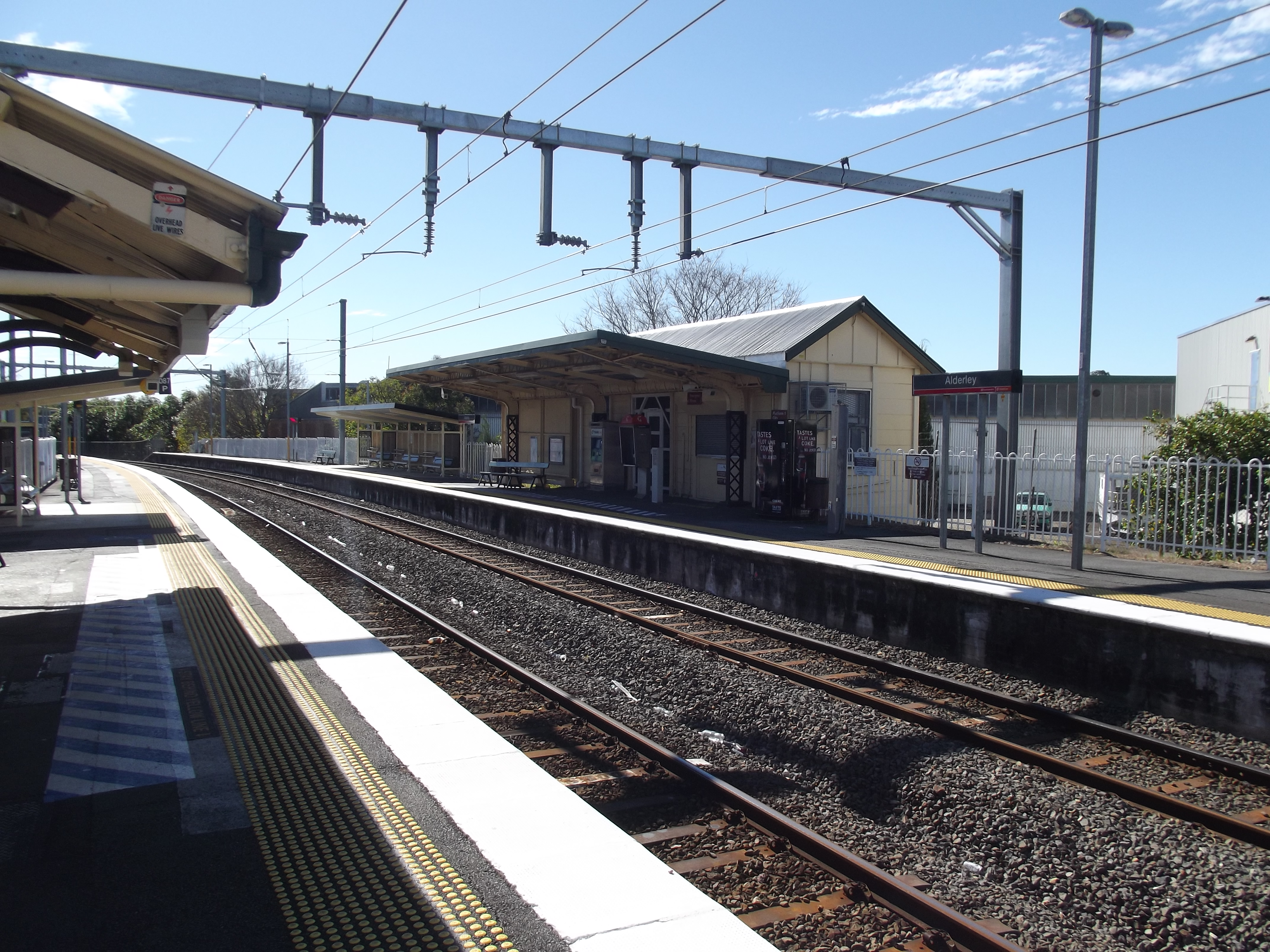
- North-west bound view from Platform 2 in August 2012

General information
- Location: Railway Place, Alderley
- Coordinates: 27°25′23″S 153°00′2″E
- Owner: Queensland Rail
- Operator: Queensland Rail
- Line: Ferny Grove
- Distance: 7.96 kilometres from Central
- Platforms: 2 side
- Tracks: 2

Construction
- Structure type: Ground
- Parking: 86 bays
- Cycle facilities: Yes
- Accessible: Assisted

Other information
- Status: Staffed part time
- Station code: 600376 (platform 1); 600375 (platform 2)
- Fare zone: Zone 1
- Website: Queensland Rail

History
- Opened: 5 February 1899

Services
Preceding station	Queensland Rail	Following station
Newmarket towards Beenleigh via Roma Street	Ferny Grove line	Enoggera towards Ferny Grove
Location

Alderley is a railway station operated by Queensland Rail on the Ferny Grove line. It opened in 1899 and serves the Brisbane suburb of Alderley. It is a ground level station, featuring two side platforms.

== History ==
It opened on 5 February 1899 at the same time as the line. A shelter for passengers was built on the outbound side in 1897, which has since been demolished. In 1921 a duplication of the track occurred. The shelter shed on the outbound platform was built in 1926, while the station building on the inbound platform was constructed circa 1950-52. The station has been a Local Heritage Place since January 2004, due to It contributing to the development of the suburb, while providing the provision of railway services to the local area in the early to mid-20th century. In 2017, the station received many upgrades. In 2020, deterioration forced the closure of the timber bridge over the rail line at Frederick Street in Alderley.

== Services ==
Alderley station is served by all stops Ferny Grove line services from Ferny Grove to Roma Street, Boggo Road, Coopers Plains and Beenleigh.

== Platforms and services ==
Alderley platform arrangement
Platform	Line	Destination	Notes
1	Ferny Grove	Roma Street (to Beenleigh line)	
2	Ferny Grove	Ferny Grove	
