= Gaythorne railway station =

Railway station in Queensland, Australia

Gaythorne
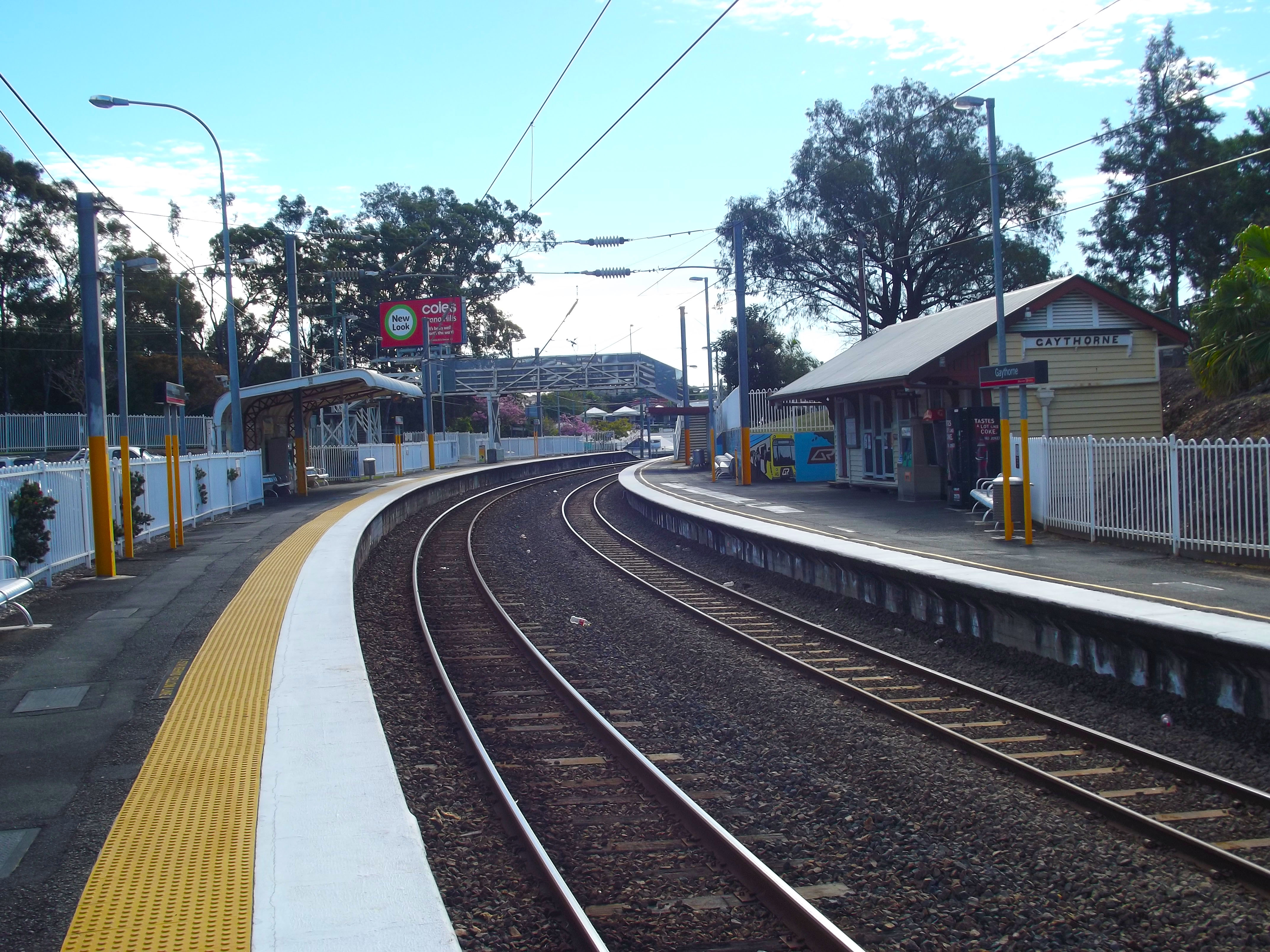
- North-west bound view from Platform 2 in August 2012

General information
- Location: 30 Station Avenue, Gaythorne
- Coordinates: 27°25′9″S 152°59′6″E
- Owner: Queensland Rail
- Operator: Queensland Rail
- Line: Ferny Grove
- Distance: 9.63 kilometres from Central
- Platforms: 2 side
- Tracks: 2

Construction
- Structure type: Ground
- Parking: 130 bays
- Cycle facilities: 8
- Accessible: Yes

Other information
- Status: Staffed part time
- Station code: 600379 (platform 1); 600380 (platform 2)
- Fare zone: Zone 1/2
- Website: Queensland Rail

History
- Opened: 1916
- Former names: Rifle Range

Services
Preceding station	Queensland Rail	Following station
Enoggera towards Beenleigh via Roma Street	Ferny Grove line	Mitchelton towards Ferny Grove
Location

Gaythorne is a railway station operated by Queensland Rail on the Ferny Grove line. It opened in 1916 and serves the Brisbane suburb of Gaythorne. It is a ground level station, featuring two side platforms.

== History ==
The station was built in 1916 and originally named Rifle Range Station. It was built as an extension of the Ferny Grove line from Enoggera to service the new military camps established in the area during World War 1, such as Bells Paddock. After the war, in 1923, a petition was circulated calling for the station's named to be changed to Gaythorne after the closure of the wartime camps.

== Services ==
Gaythorne station is served by all stops Ferny Grove line services from Ferny Grove to Roma Street, Boggo Road (formerly Park Road), Coopers Plains and Beenleigh.

== Platforms and services ==
Gaythorne platform arrangement
Platform	Line	Destination	Notes
1	Ferny Grove	Roma Street (to Beenleigh line)	
2	Ferny Grove	Ferny Grove	
