= Mitchelton railway station =

Railway station in Queensland, Australia

Mitchelton
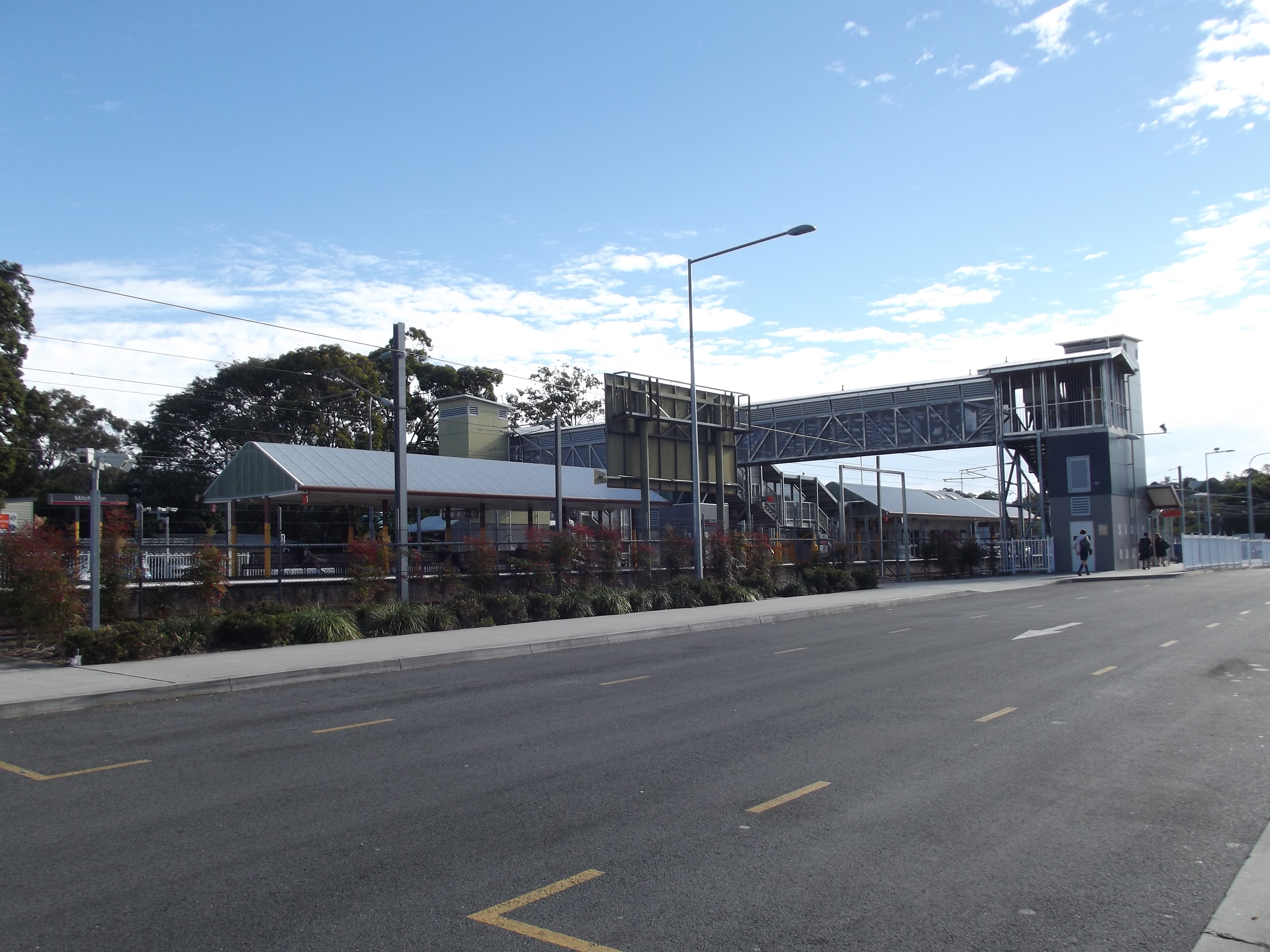
- Mitchelton station in August 2012

General information
- Location: McConaghy Street, Mitchelton
- Coordinates: 27°24′42″S 152°58′33″E
- Owner: Queensland Rail
- Operator: Queensland Rail
- Line: Ferny Grove
- Distance: 10.94 kilometres from Central
- Platforms: 2 (1 island)
- Tracks: 2
- Bus routes: 369, 390, 396, 397, 398
- Bus operators: Transport for Brisbane

Construction
- Structure type: Ground
- Parking: 303 bays
- Cycle facilities: Yes
- Accessible: Yes

Other information
- Status: Staffed
- Station code: 600381 (platform 1); 600382 (platform 2)
- Fare zone: Zone 2
- Website: Queensland Rail

History
- Opened: 3 March 1918

Passengers
- 2022-23: 237,657
- Rank: 25

Services
Preceding station	Queensland Rail	Following station
Gaythorne towards Beenleigh via Roma Street	Ferny Grove line	Oxford Park towards Ferny Grove
Location

Mitchelton is a railway station operated by Queensland Rail on the Ferny Grove line. It opened in 1918 and serves the Brisbane suburb of Mitchelton. It is a ground level station, featuring one island platform with two faces.

== History ==
The station opened in March 1918 due to public demand.

== Services ==
Mitchelton station is served by all stops Ferny Grove line services from Ferny Grove to Roma Street, Boggo Road (formerly Park Road), Coopers Plains and Beenleigh.

== Platforms and services ==
Mitchelton platform arrangement
Platform	Line	Destination	Notes
1	Ferny Grove	Roma Street (to Beenleigh line)	
2	Ferny Grove	Ferny Grove	

== Transport links ==
Transport for Brisbane operate four bus routes from Mitchelton station:

- 369: to Toombul via Stafford
- 396: to Arana Hills
- 397: to Ferny Grove station via Everton Hills
- 398: to Ferny Grove station via Arana Hills

In addition to the above, Transport for Brisbane buses also call at the nearby Brookside bus station.
