= Ferny Grove line =

Passenger rail service in Queensland, Australia

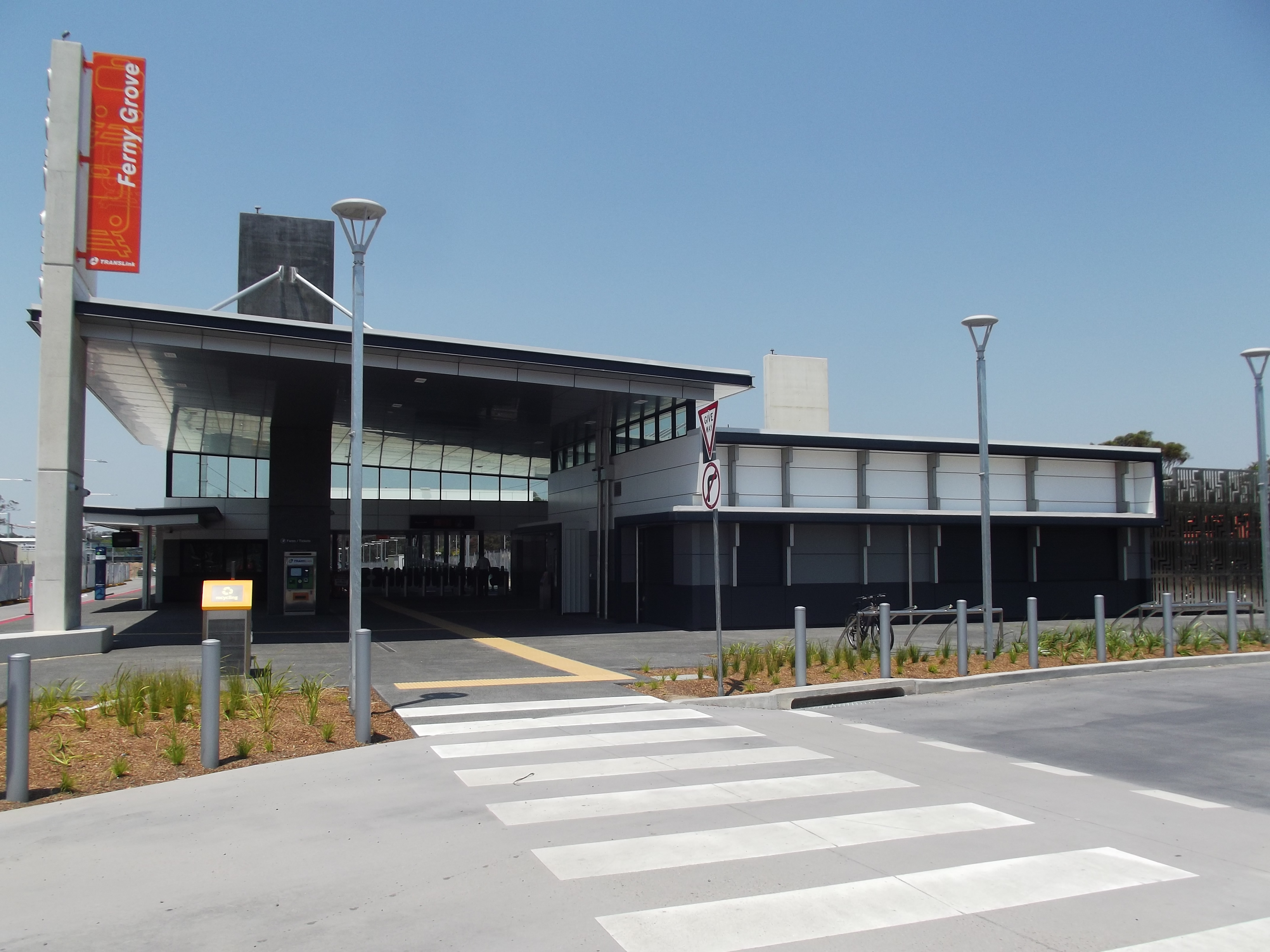
- Ferny Grove station in October 2012

Overview
- Status: Operational
- Owner: Queensland Rail
- Termini: Roma Street; Ferny Grove
- Stations: 15
- Website: queenslandrail.com.au

Service
- Type: Commuter rail
- Services: 1
- Route number: BNFG; BRFG; FGBN; FGBR
- Operator: Queensland Rail
- Rolling stock: SMU & IMU

History
- Opened: 1899; 127 years ago Enoggera, 1919; 107 years ago Mitchelton, 1920; 106 years ago Dayboro
- Closed: 1955; 71 years ago West of Ferny Grove

Technical
- Line length: 16.9 km (10.5 mi)
- Track length: 16.9 km (10.5 mi)
- Number of tracks: 2
- Track gauge: 1,067 mm (3 ft 6 in)
- Electrification: 1979; 47 years ago
- Operating speed: Max 100 km/h (62 mph), Min 20 km/h (12 mph)

The T6 Ferny Grove line is a suburban commuter railway line in Brisbane, Queensland. Operated by Queensland Rail, the line runs for 16.9 kilometres (11 miles) from Ferny Grove to Roma Street, where services continue on the Beenleigh line.

== History ==
Based on initial surveys, in 1885 the Queensland Government planned to construct a railway line to Samford with the intention of extending it to Gympie. However, no immediate action was taken and further surveys resulted in the decision to construct the line to Gympie via the Mayne railway station (Bowen Hills) which created the North Coast railway line.

The relocation of Brisbane's cattle sales yard from Normanby to Newmarket created a need to provide a railway to Newmarket. With financial guarantees provided by the Windsor Shire Council and the Enoggera Divisional Board, the Queensland Railways built a branch line from Mayne railway station (Bowen Hills) to Newmarket railway station to service the cattle yards and beyond to Enoggera railway station for suburban passenger services. This line opened on 5 February 1899. The suburban service to Enoggera was not very profitable and the Queensland Government resisted any efforts to extend the Brisbane tramway services to Enoggera to avoid further competition.

With the financial assistance of the Australian Defence Department, the line was extended to Rifle Range railway station (now called Gaythorne railway station) on 16 February 1916. The line was extended to Mitchelton railway station on 2 March 1918. The line was extended to Samford railway station on 1 July 1918, to Samsonvale railway station (3 March 1919), to Kobble railway station (3 November 1919) and finally to Dayboro railway station on 25 September 1920. The additional traffic on the line led to its duplication to Newmarket in 1921. The sales yards were moved to Cannon Hill in 1931.

On 5 May 1947, a packed excursion train derailed at Camp Mountain, after Ferny Grove railway station, in what is Queensland's worst rail tragedy, the Camp Mountain train disaster.

The line was duplicated to Mitchelton in 1953, and the first automatic level crossing boom gates in Queensland were installed at Wilston Road, Newmarket in 1954.

The line was closed beyond Ferny Grove after 30 June 1955 after the freight traffic was lost to road transport. Ferny Grove was initially known as Ferny Flats, but the railway department changed the name of the railway station because of a Ferny Flats in New South Wales; the surrounding area followed suit.

Between 2008 and 2012 the remaining single track section between Mitchelton and Ferny Grove was duplicated, including an upgraded Ferny Grove station, an additional 1000 car parking spaces and construction of a new bus interchange.

On 10 August 2026, the Ferny Grove line was numbered T6 (along with the Beenleigh line) by Translink.

== Frequency and services ==
Typical service frequency on the Ferny Grove Line is four trains per hour (every 15 minutes) on weekdays and two trains per hour (every 30 minutes) at night and on weekends, increasing to 8 trains per hour (every 7.5 minutes) during weekday peak times for faster travel times for commuters working in the Brisbane central business district. Most services stop at all stations to Roma Street railway station. The typical travel time between Ferny Grove and Brisbane City is approximately 31 minutes (to Central).

Ferny Grove line services typically continue as Beenleigh line services.

Passengers for and from the Airport, Caboolture, Doomben, Nambour and Gympie North, Redcliffe Peninsula and Shorncliffe lines change at Bowen Hills, and all other lines at Roma Street.

=== Stations ===
List of T6 Ferny Grove line stations
T6 Ferny Grove line
| Station | Image | Suburb | Opened | Terrain | Connections | Time (Note: Travel time in minutes from Roma Street.) |
| | Continues from T6 Beenleigh line | | | | | |
|---|---|---|---|---|---|---|
| Roma Street | | Brisbane CBD | 14 June 1875 | Ground | Ipswich/Rosewood line Springfield line Doomben Cleveland line Gold Coast line Brisbane Metro Bus transport in Queensland | 0 |
| Central | | Brisbane CBD | 18 August 1889 | Built over | Sunshine Coast line, Queensland Redcliffe Peninsula line Doomben Shorncliffe line Airport line, Brisbane | 2 (Note: Service dwells for 2 minutes.) |
| Fortitude Valley | | Fortitude Valley | 1 November 1890 | Underground | Sunshine Coast line, Queensland Redcliffe Peninsula line Doomben Shorncliffe line Airport line, Brisbane | 6 |
| Bowen Hills | | Bowen Hills | 1973 | Ground | Sunshine Coast line, Queensland Redcliffe Peninsula line Doomben Shorncliffe line Airport line, Brisbane | 9 |
| Windsor | | Windsor | 1921 | Ground | Bus transport in Queensland | 13 |
| Wilston | | Wilston | 5 February 1899 | Ground | none | 15 |
| Newmarket | | Newmarket | 5 February 1899 | Ground | none | 17 |
| Alderley | | Alderley | 5 February 1899 | Ground | none | 19 |
| Enoggera | | Enoggera | 5 February 1899 | Ground | none | 21 |
| Gaythorne | | Gaythorne | 1916 | Ground | none | 23 |
| Mitchelton | | Mitchelton | March 1918 | Ground | none | 25 |
| Oxford Park | | Mitchelton | 1920 | Ground | none | 27 |
| Grovely | | Keperra | 29 June 1918 | Ground | none | 29 |
| Keperra | | Keperra | 1932 | Ground | none | 31 |
| Ferny Grove | | Ferny Grove | 1918 | Ground | none | 35 |

== Gallery ==
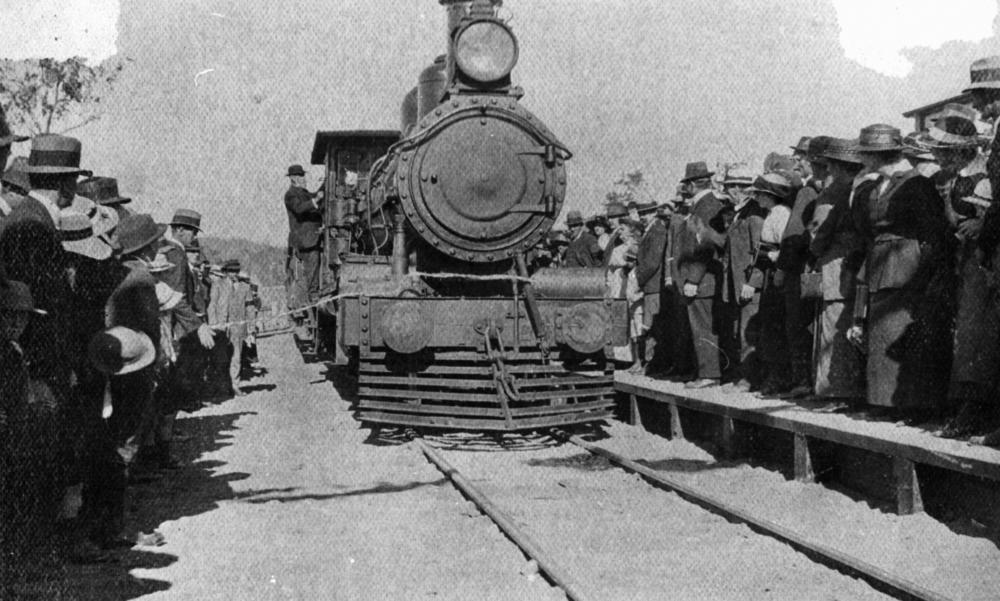
Cutting of the ribbon at the opening of the railway to Samford, 1919

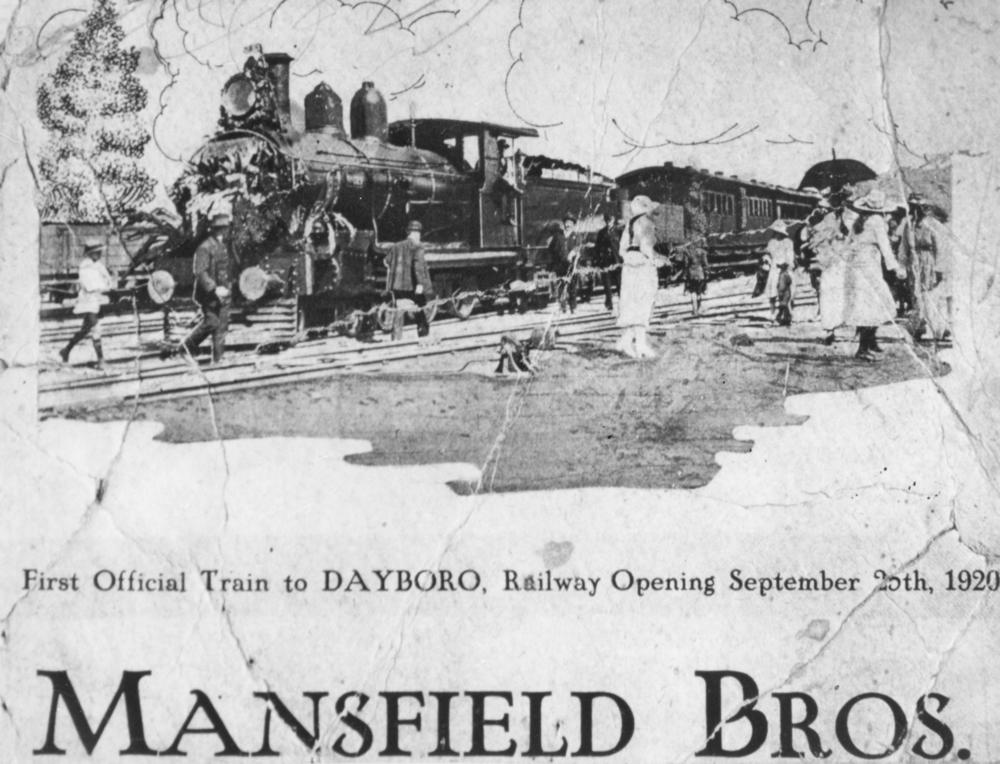
Ad for the opening of the line to Dayboro, 1920

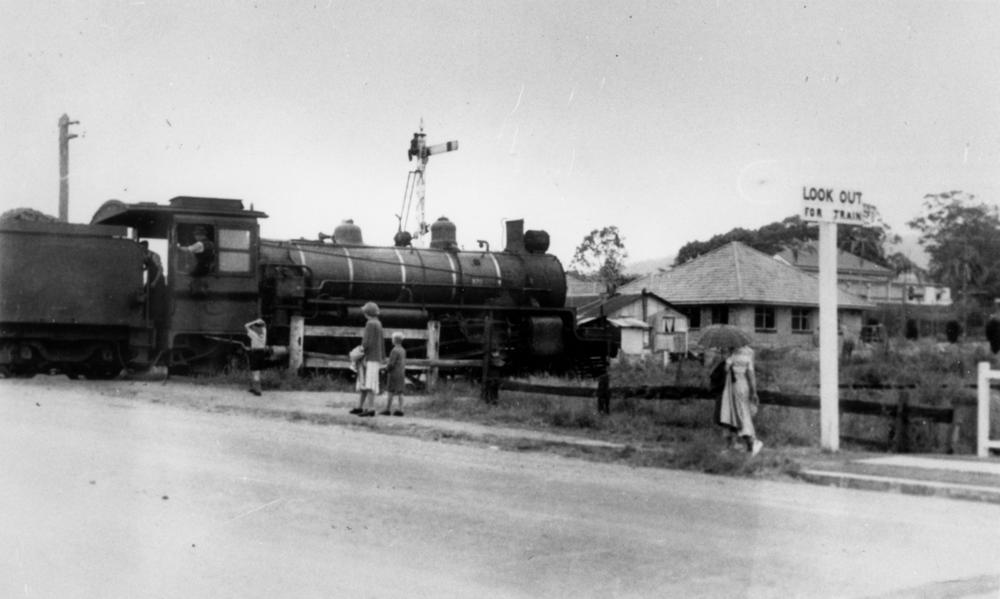
Train passing through the level crossing in Wardell Street, Enoggera ~1950

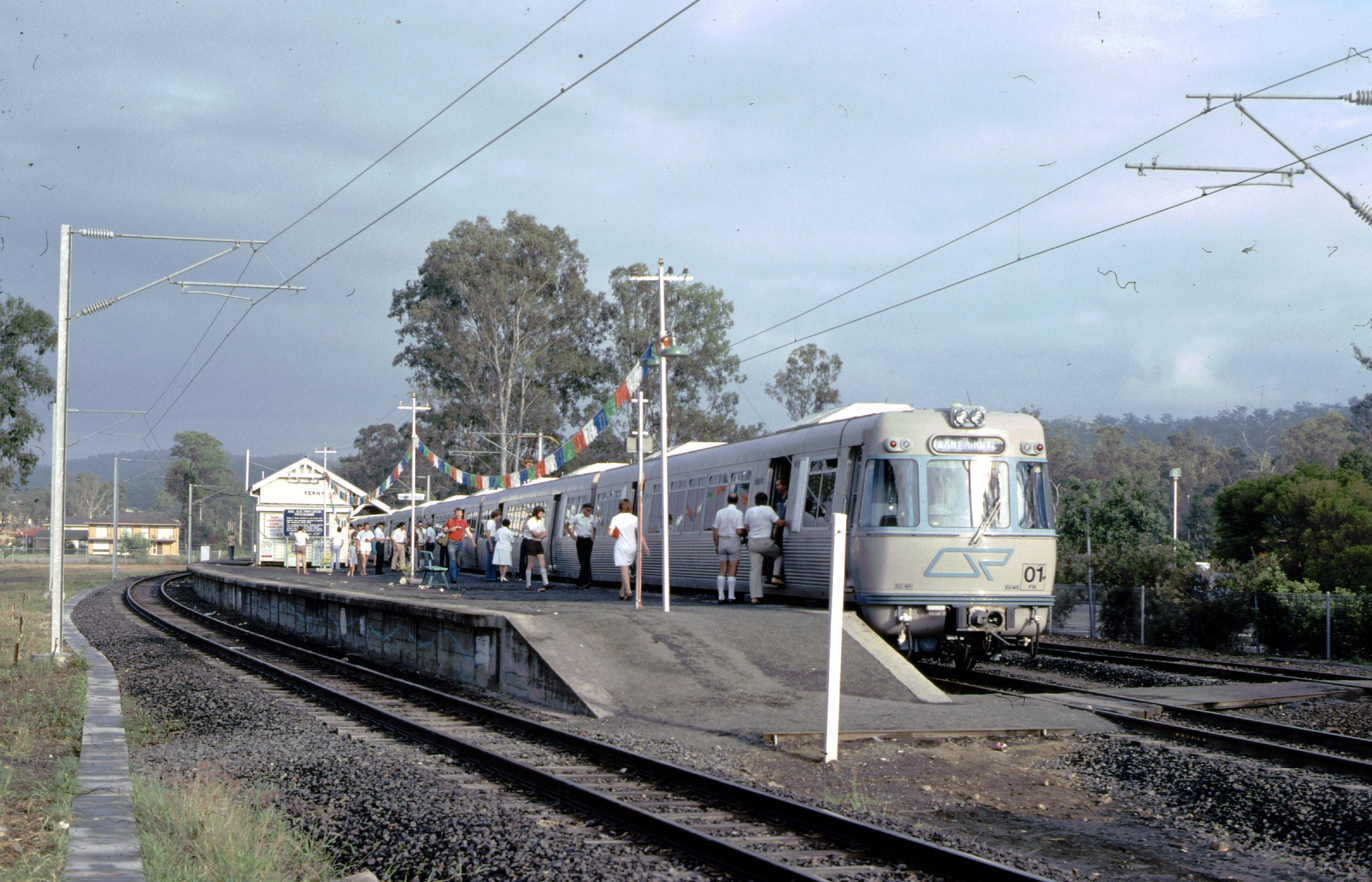
Opening of Brisbane suburban electrification, Ferny Grove, 1979

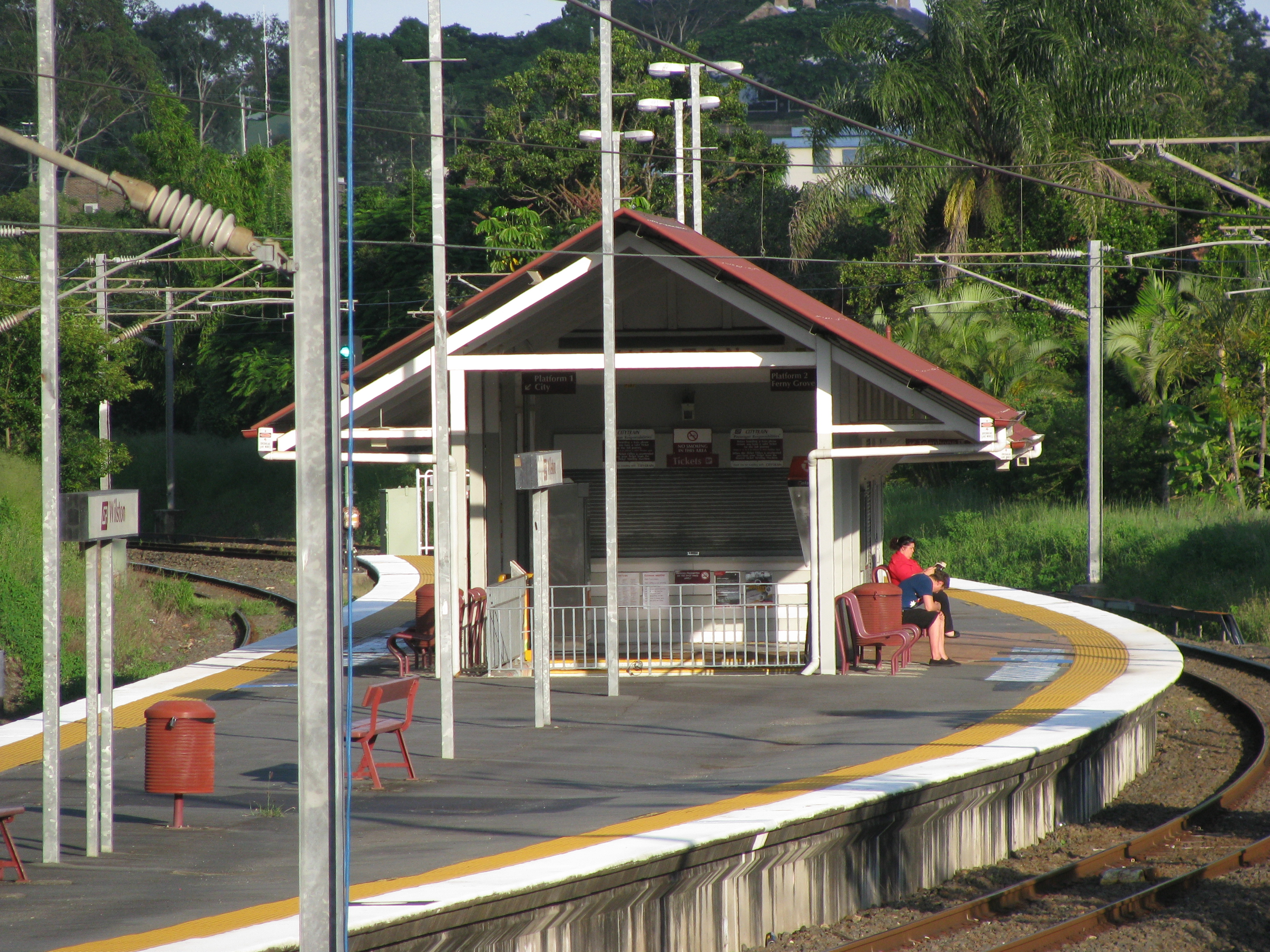
Wilston, 2011

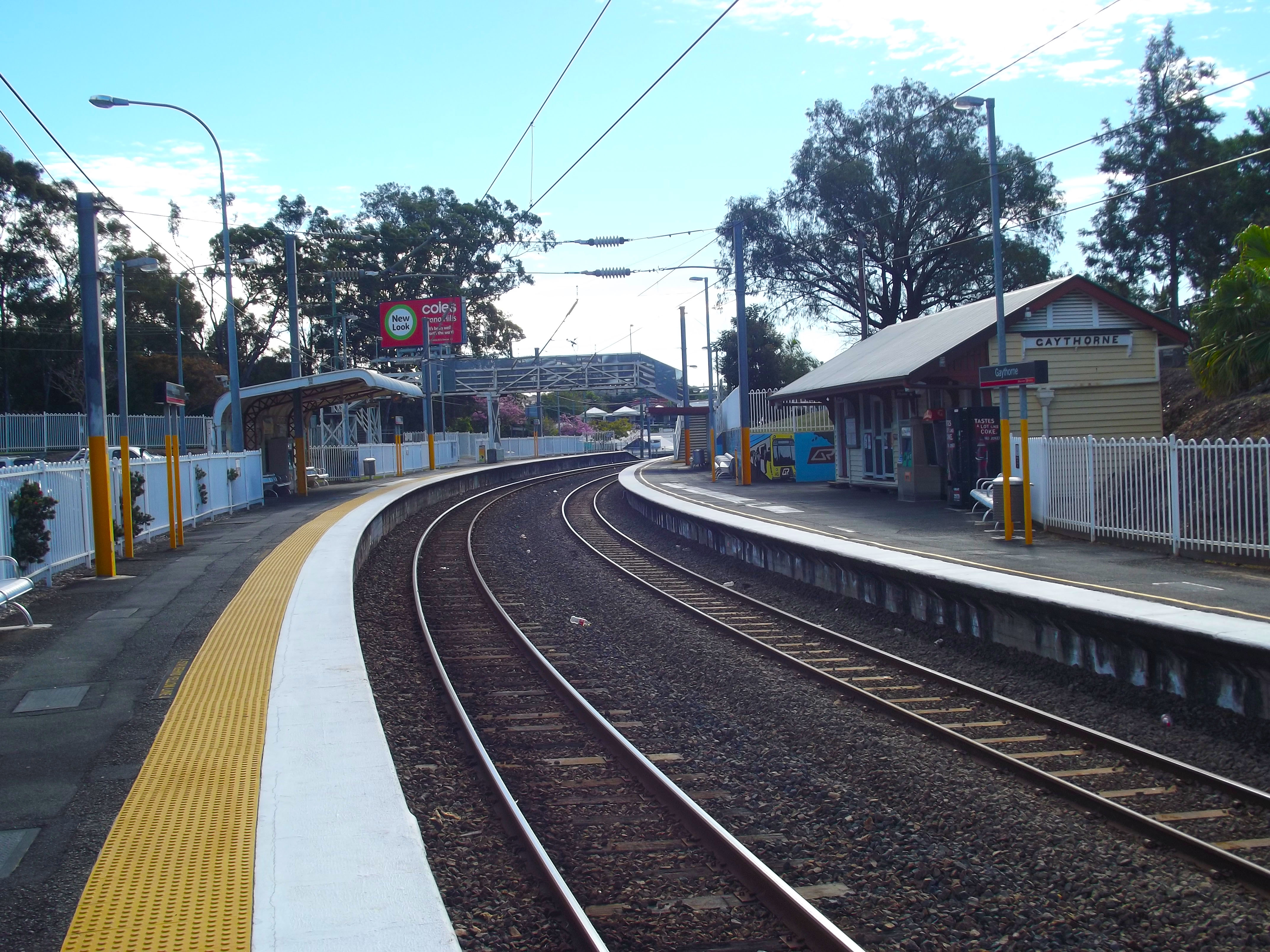
Gaythorne, 2012

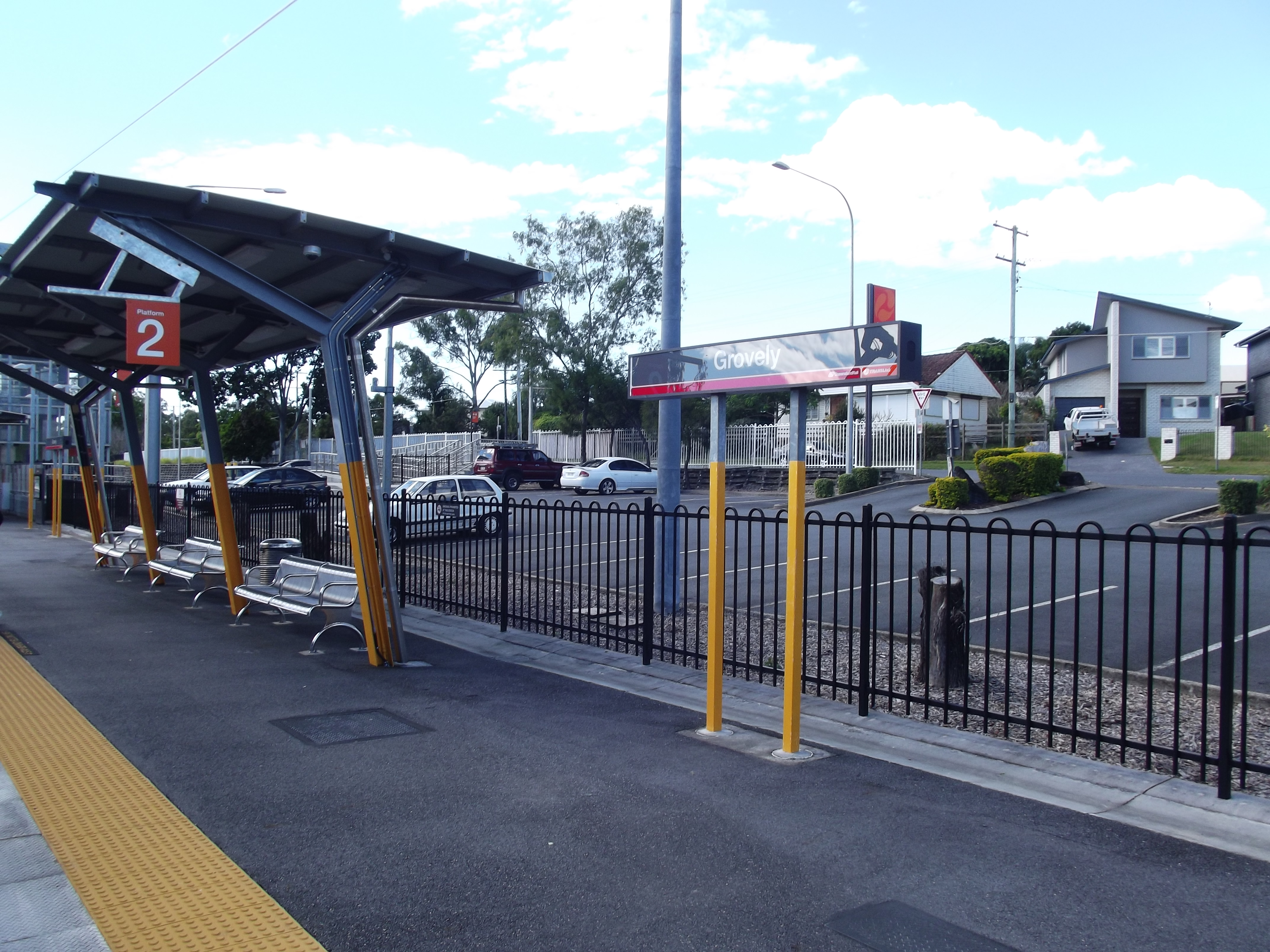
Grovely, 2012

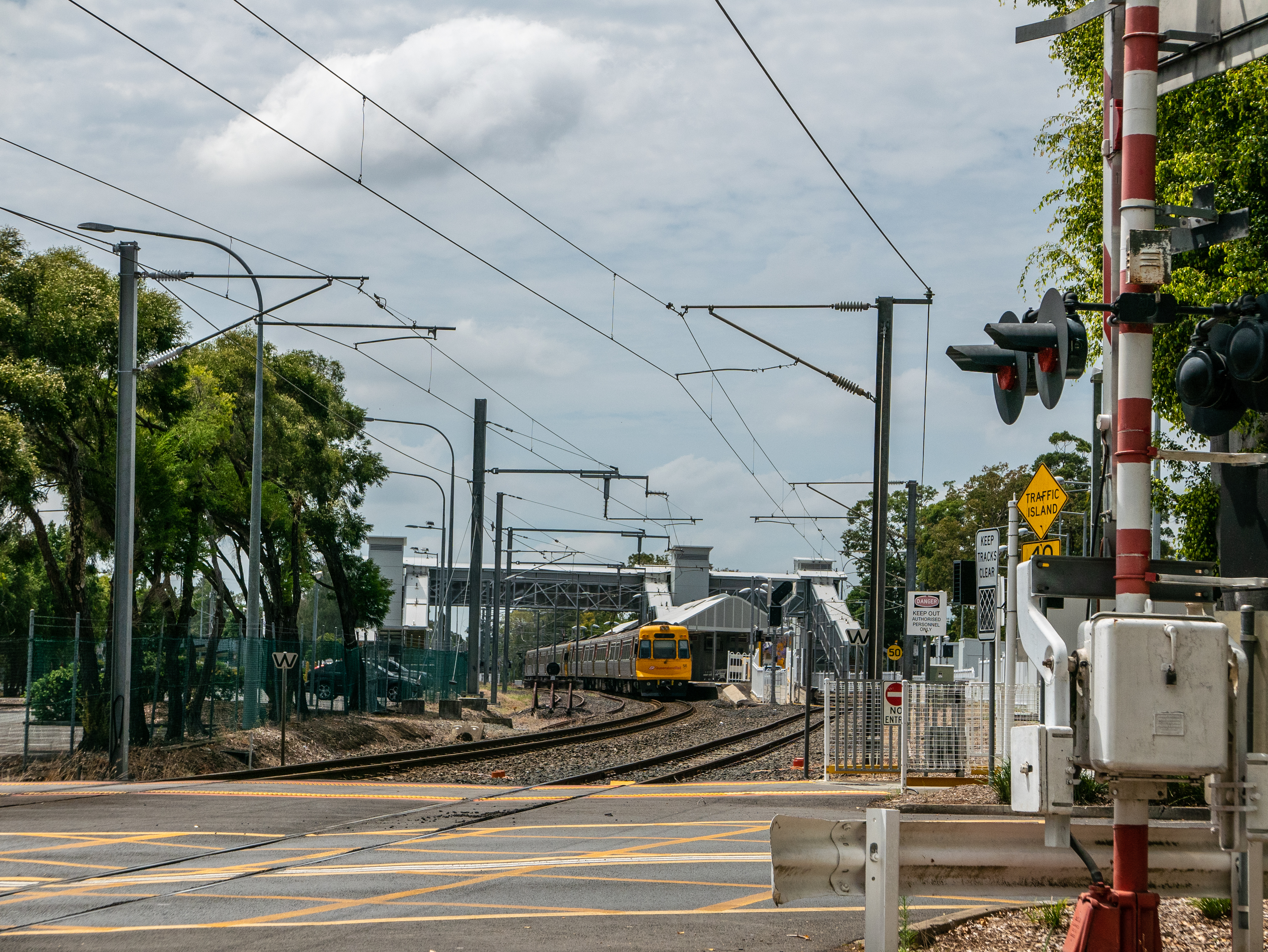
Queensland Rail EMU 56 at Mitchelton, 2016
