= Enoggera railway station =

Railway station in Queensland, Australia

Enoggera
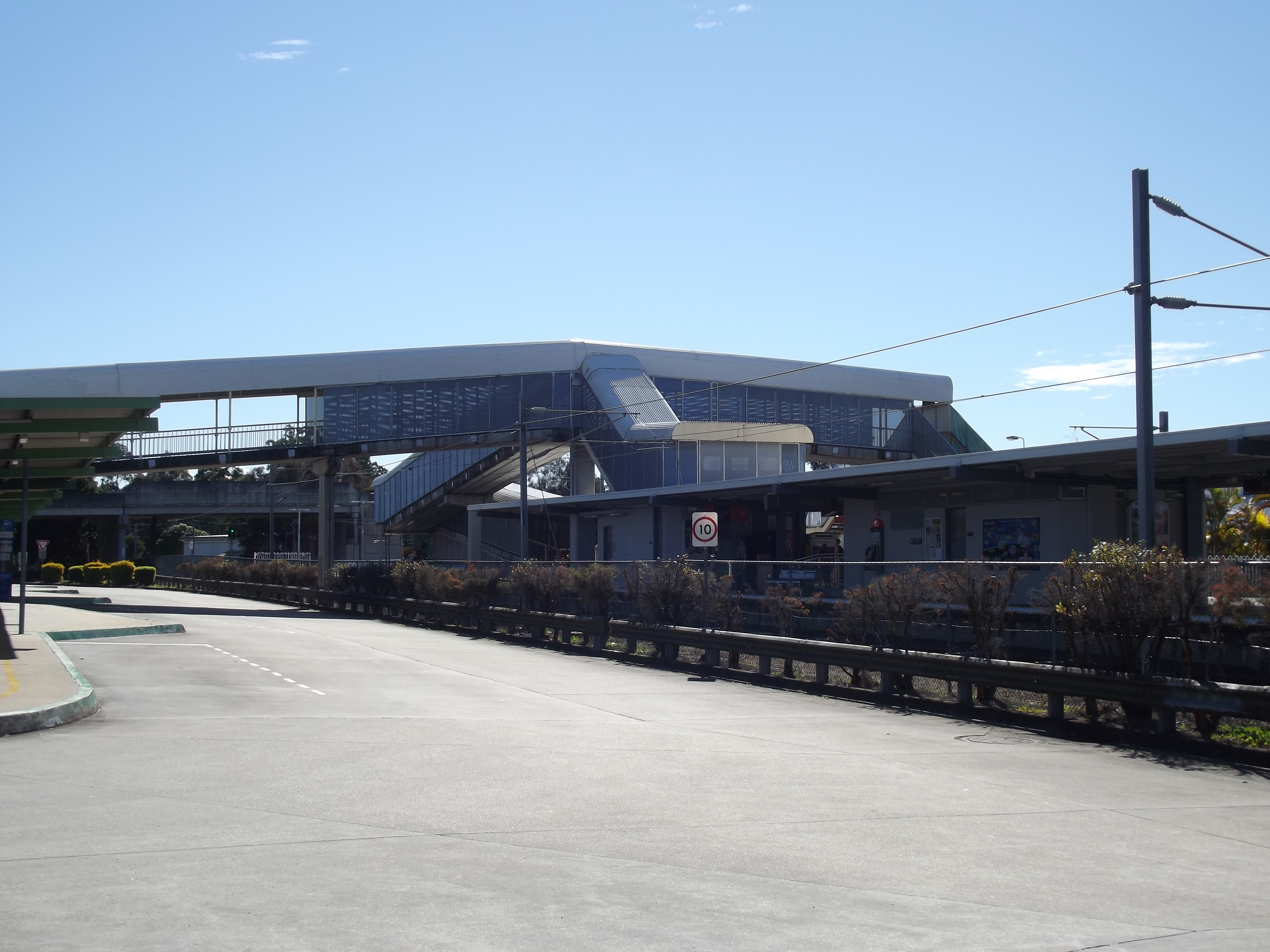
- North-west bound view in August 2012

General information
- Location: Glenalva Terrace, Enoggera
- Coordinates: 27°25′13″S 152°59′32″E
- Owner: Queensland Rail
- Operator: Queensland Rail
- Line: Ferny Grove
- Distance: 8.86 kilometres from Central
- Platforms: 2 (1 island)
- Tracks: 2

Construction
- Structure type: Ground
- Parking: 212 bays
- Cycle facilities: Yes
- Accessible: Assisted

Other information
- Status: Staffed
- Station code: 600377 (platform 1); 600378 (platform 2)
- Fare zone: Zone 1/2
- Website: Queensland Rail

History
- Opened: 1899

Services
Preceding station	Queensland Rail	Following station
Alderley towards Beenleigh via Roma Street	Ferny Grove line	Gaythorne towards Ferny Grove
Location

Enoggera is a railway station operated by Queensland Rail on the Ferny Grove line. It opened in 1899 and serves the Brisbane suburb of Enoggera. It is a ground level station, featuring one island platform with two faces.

== History ==
Enogerra was the original terminus when the line opened in 1899. The line was progressively extended to Samford in 1918.

== Services ==
Enogerra station is served by all stops Ferny Grove line services from Ferny Grove to Roma Street, Boggo Road, Coopers Plains and Beenleigh.

== Platforms and services ==
Enoggera platform arrangement
Platform	Line	Destination	Notes
1	Ferny Grove	Roma Street (to Beenleigh line)	
2	Ferny Grove	Ferny Grove	
