= Mitchelton =

- Suburb
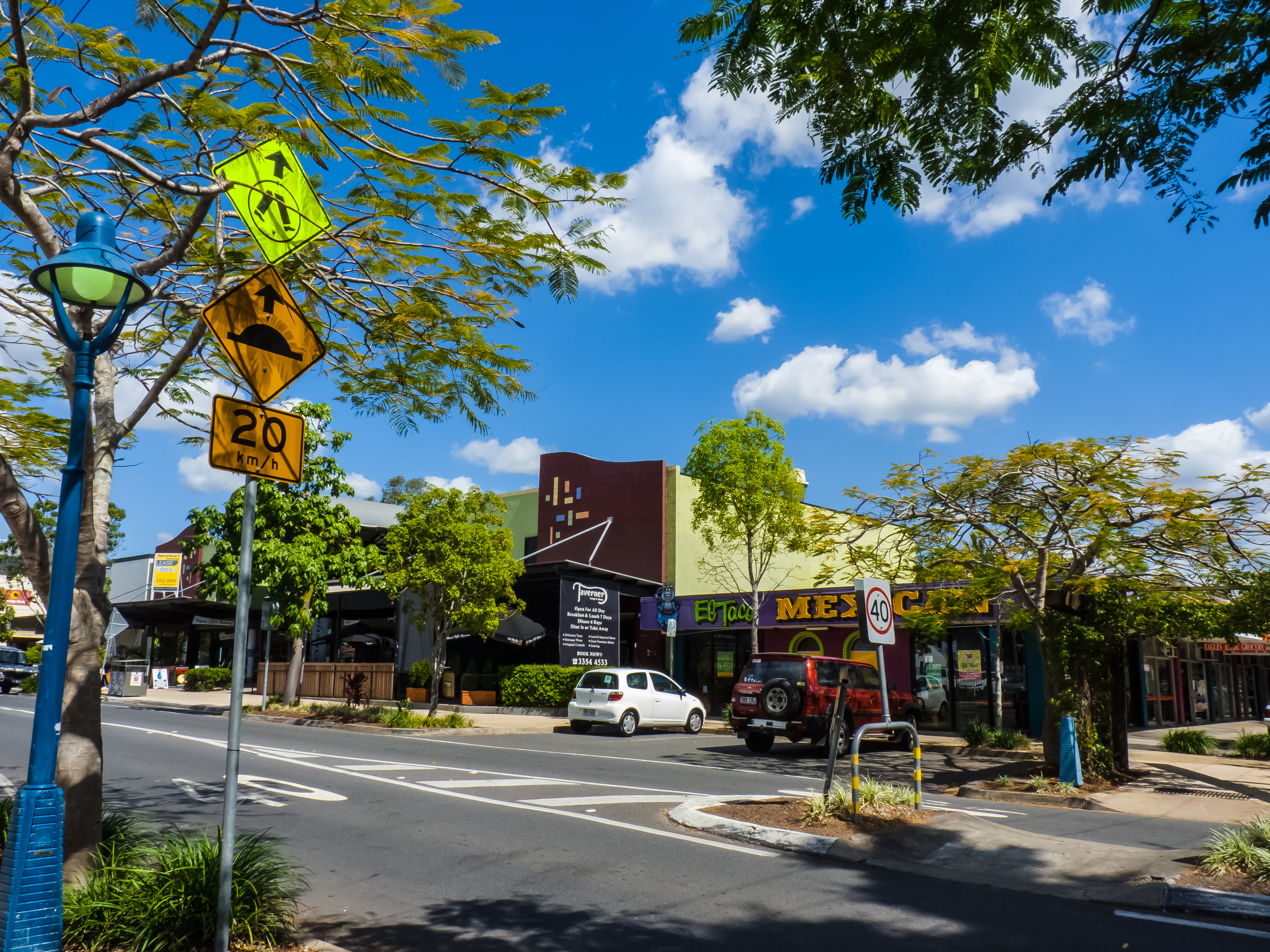
- Blackwood Street, 2012

- Interactive map of Mitchelton
- Coordinates: 27.4094°S 152.9730°E
- Country: Australia
- State: Queensland
- City: Brisbane
- LGA: City of Brisbane (Enoggera Ward)
- Location: 9.6 km (6.0 mi) NW of Brisbane CBD

Government
  - State electorates: Ferny Grove; Everton
  - Federal division: Ryan

Area
  - Total: 4.1 km^{2} (1.6 sq mi)

Population
  - Total: 9,244 (2021 census)
  - Density: 2,255/km^{2} (5,840/sq mi)
- Time zone: UTC+10:00 (AEST)
- Postcode: 4053
Suburbs around Mitchelton
Keperra	Everton Hills	Everton Park
Keperra	Mitchelton	Everton Park
Enoggera	Enoggera	Gaythorne

Mitchelton is a north-western suburb in the City of Brisbane, Queensland, Australia. In the 2021 census, Mitchelton had a population of 9,244 people.

== Geography ==
The suburb is located 9.6 kilometres (6.0 mi) by road from the Brisbane GPO. Mitchelton is part of the northwestern suburbs. It is a growing suburb with many Queenslander style houses and leafy streets. The area is quite hilly and most of the suburb is on a north-facing slope.

== History ==
Mitchelton is an area with a long history. Mitchelton's name comes from one particular family of the first settlers in the area. The Mitchell family emigrated from England in the 1850s. Nicholas Mitchell purchased an estate he named "Mitchelton" by 1875. This area was first subdivided in the 1890s.

St Matthew's Church of England was built from 1867 to 1869. The church and its cemetery are at 35 Church Road (27.409°S 152.9684°E). It was designed by Charles Tiffin.

On 4 October 1913, Arthur Blackwood sold a large portion of land known as the Oxford Park Estate between Samford Road and Kedron Brook. It was a subdivision of 300 suburban allotments (mostly 32 perches) and 8 larger farm allotments on St Helens Road fronting Kedron Brook. The estate created Blackwood Street and University Road (the northern part of which is now Pascoe Street). One of the advertised benefits of the estate were its 1/4 mile (0.40 km) proximity to the proposed Groveley railway station on the Ferny Grove railway line. The estate gave its name to the Oxford Park railway station, despite the railway station being to the west of the estate, which resulted in land near that railway station being commonly known as Oxford Park (although that land never formed part of the Oxford Park subdivision).

Grovely State School opened on 9 October 1916. It was renamed Mitchelton State School in 1923. (It is not to be confused with the present day Grovely State School in Keperra, which opened in 1956).

In June 1922, the third section of Grovely Lodge Estate, consisting of149 residential sites and 4 large blocks, was advertised by Cameron Bros Auctioneers. The estate was described as 5 minutes walk to both Mitchelton railway station and state school.

The first section of Mitchelton View Estate was offered for sale in 1926 by B.F. Caniffe. In May 1933, B.F. Caniffe auctioned 50 suburban blocks, the third section of the Mitchelton View Estate. The subdivision was bounded by Gizerah Street, Taylors Road, Frasers Road and Mashobra Street. However, the bidding did not reach the reserve price and the blocks were not sold.

In 1930 the Sisters of the Good Shepherd established the Good Shepherd Home for girls with special needs or those deemed to be "uncontrollable" in their own homes; these girls worked in the home's commercial laundry. The home was closed in late 1974 due to changes in community and government expectations about institutionalised care of children.

in January 1949 the Sisters of the Good Samaritan opened Our Lady of Dolours Catholic School at the request of James Duhig, the Roman Catholic Archbishop of Brisbane, with 69 students and two sisters as teachers.

Mitchelton Infants State School opened on 29 January 1952; it closed 1 January 1986.

Mitchelton State High School opened on 31 January 1956.

All Souls' Anglican Church was dedicated on 26 March 1961 by Archbishop Halse and consecrated on 9 March 1975 by Archbishop Arnott. Its closure was approved circa 1986. It was located at 10 Tel El Kebir Street on the corner of Heliopolis Parade (27.4166°S 152.9787°E). As at 2020, the building is used as a child care centre.

Mt Maria College was established in Mitchelton in 1979 by amalgamating Years 11 and 12 of Marcellin College (a Catholic boys school in Enoggera) with St Benedict's College (a Catholic girls school in Wilston). It occupied the former Good Shepherd Home.

Mitchelton State Special School opened on 17 May 1971.

The current Mitchelton Public Library opened in 1983 and had a major refurbishment in 2013.

== Demographics ==
In the 2016 census, Mitchelton had a population of 8,559 people, 52.3% female and 47.7% male. The median age of the Mitchelton population was 36 years of age, 2 years below the Australian median. 78.3% of people living in Mitchelton were born in Australia, compared to the national average of 66.7%; the next most common countries of birth were England 3.8%, New Zealand 2.6%, India 1.1%, South Africa 0.8%, United States of America 0.7%. 87.4% of people spoke only English at home; the next most common languages were Mandarin 0.9%, Spanish 0.8%, German 0.5%, Japanese 0.5%, French 0.4%.

In the 2021 census, Mitchelton had a population of 9,244 people.

== Heritage listings ==
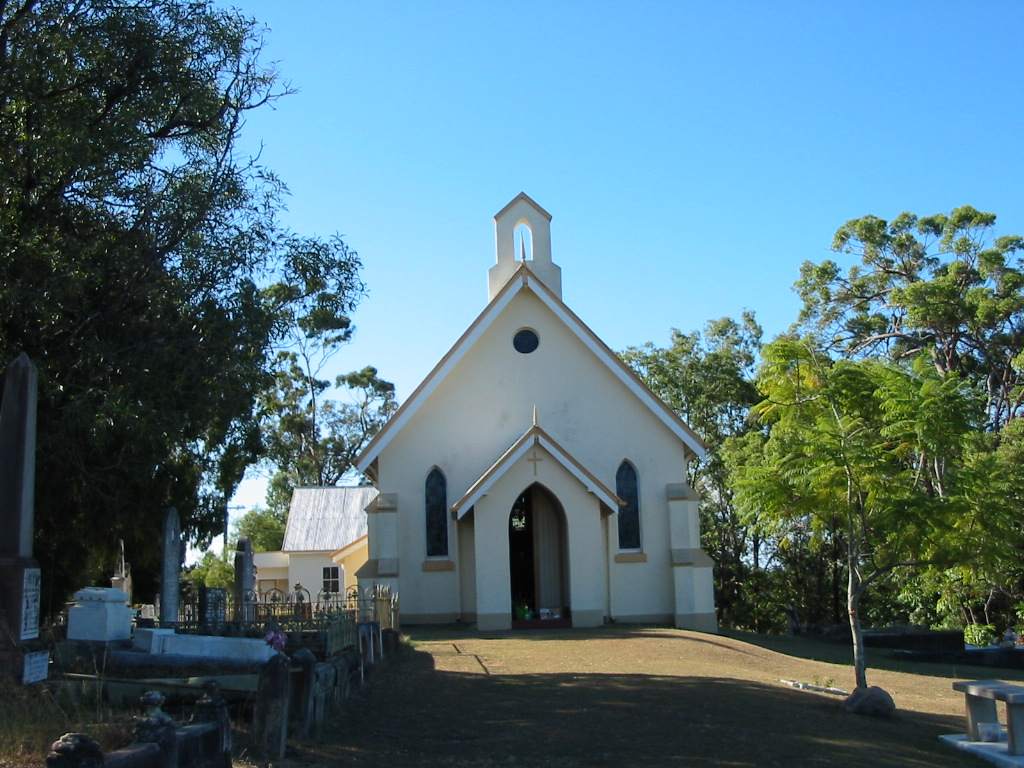
St Matthews Anglican Church, Grovely (now Mitchelton), 2010

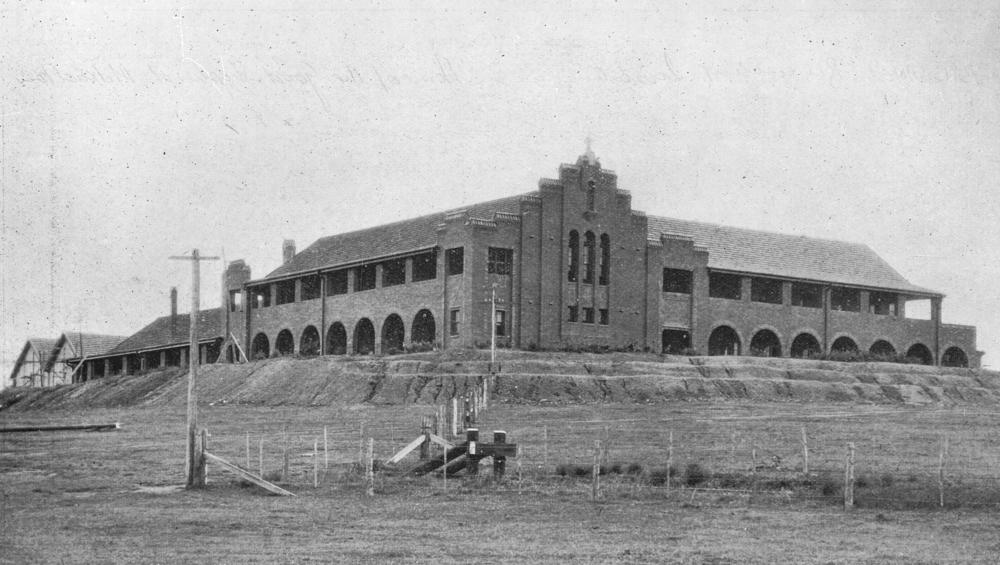
Home of the Good Shepherd (now Mt Maria College), Mitchelton, Brisbane, 1931

Mitchelton has a number of heritage-listed sites, including:

- St Matthews Anglican Church, Grovely, 35 Church Road
- former Redemptorist Monastery, 46 Church Road
- Residence, 10 Corvi Street
- Mitchelton State School, 47 Glen Retreat Road (27.4127°S 152.9689°E)
- Good Shepherd Home, Mt Maria College, 67 Osborne Road
- Bus shelter, Samford Road (opposite Suez Street)
- former Police Station, 543 Samford Road
- Our Lady of Dolours Church, 600 Samford Road
- former Mitchelton Infants School, 671 Samford Road
- Residence, 71 St Helens Road

== Education ==
Mitchelton is home to numerous schools, which include Mitchelton State School, Mitchelton State High School, Mitchelton Special School, Our Lady of Dolours Primary School and Mt Maria College, which is based in the old Sisters of the Good Shepherd home for troubled girls.

Mitchelton State School is a government primary (Prep–6) school for boys and girls at 47 Glen Retreat Road (27.4131°S 152.9697°E). In 2017, the school had an enrolment of 469 students with 39 teachers (29 full-time equivalent) and 29 non-teaching staff (15 full-time equivalent). It includes a special education program.

Mitchelton State High School is a government secondary (7–12) school for boys and girls at 754 Samford Road (27.4104°S 152.9659°E). In 2017, the school had an enrolment of 445 students with 56 teachers (52 full-time equivalent) and 37 non-teaching staff (25 full-time equivalent). It includes a special education program.

Mitchelton Special School is a special primary and secondary (Early Childhood–12) school for boys and girls at Kedron Avenue (27.4130°S 152.9756°E). In 2017, the school had an enrolment of 145 students with 44 teachers (37 full-time equivalent) and 52 non-teaching staff (31 full-time equivalent).

Our Lady of Dolours School is a Catholic primary (Prep–6) school for boys and girls at 2 Willcocks Street (27.4143°S 152.9748°E). In 2017, the school had an enrolment of 190 students with 16 teachers (13 full-time equivalent) and 11 non-teaching staff (6 full-time equivalent).

Mt Maria College is a Catholic secondary (7–12) school for boys and girls at 54 Prospect Road (27.4114°S 152.9774°E). In 2017, the school had an enrolment of 945 students with 72 teachers (69 full-time equivalent) and 52 non-teaching staff (38 full-time equivalent).

== Facilities ==
Brookside Shopping Centre is at 159 Osborne Road (27.4091°S 152.9794°E). There is a strip shopping area on Blackwood Street south of the Mitchelton railway station (27.41160°S 152.9744°E).

The Brisbane City Council operates a public library in Mitchelton at 37 Heliopolis Parade.

== Transport ==
Oxford Park and Mitchelton railway stations provide access to regular Queensland Rail City network services on the Ferny Grove railway line to the Brisbane central business district, Beenleigh and Ferny Grove.

Mitchelton's main arterials are Samford Road, which is the main corridor for motorists travelling to the Brisbane CBD and Samford, as well as Osborne Road which is the main corridor for motorists travelling to the outer northern suburbs such as Aspley.

Mitchelton has direct access to the Kedron Brook bikeway.

== Notable people ==
Notable people from or having lived in Mitchelton include:

- Colin Davidson, Australian Army officer, Medal of Freedom
