= Gaythorne =

- Suburb
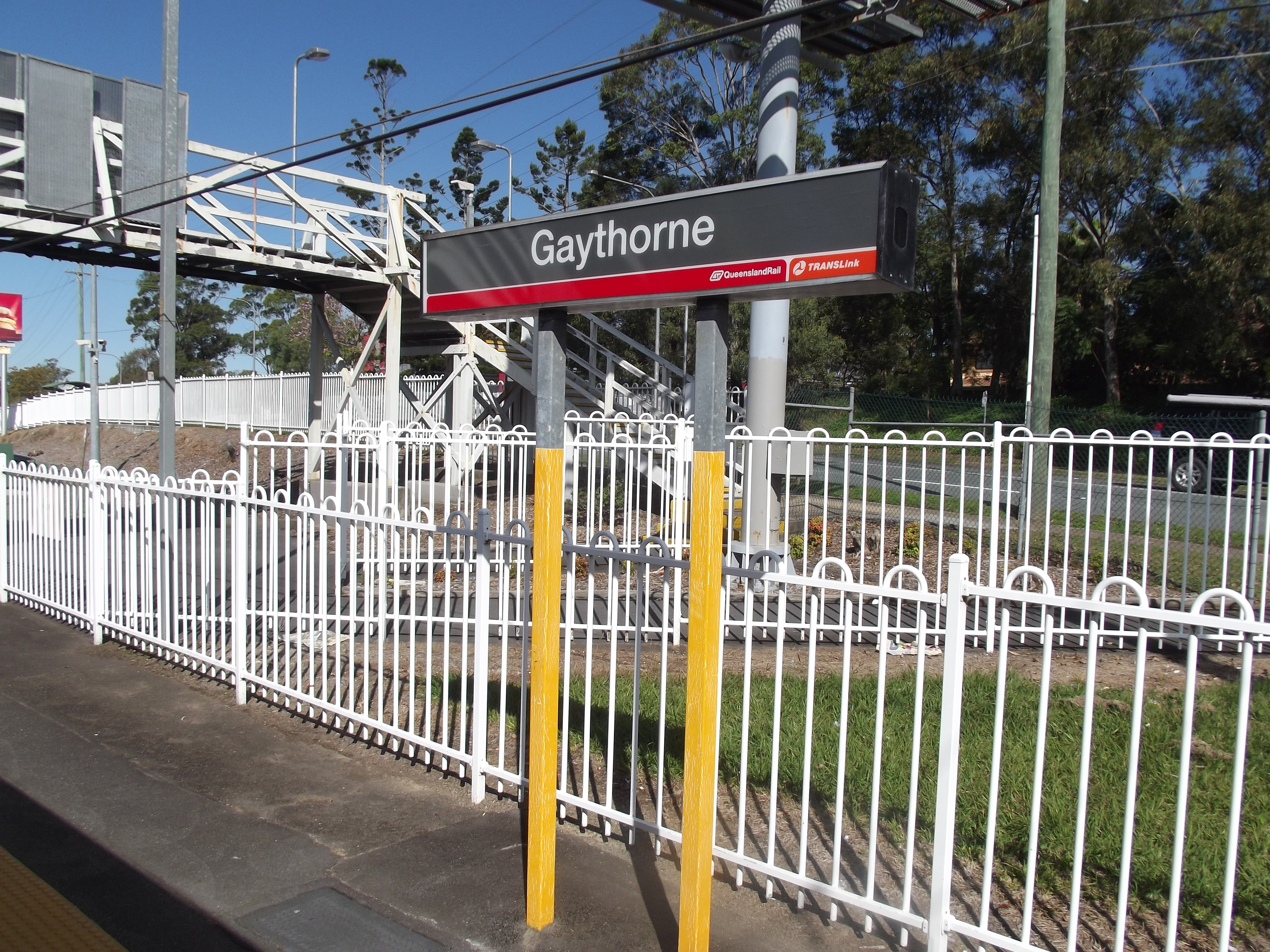
- Gaythorne railway station

- Interactive map of Gaythorne
- Coordinates: 27.4177°S 152.9833°E
- Country: Australia
- State: Queensland
- City: Brisbane
- LGA: City of Brisbane (Enoggera Ward)
- Location: 9.0 km (5.6 mi) NNW of Brisbane CBD

Government
  - State electorates: Ferny Grove; Everton
  - Federal division: Ryan

Area
  - Total: 1.1 km^{2} (0.42 sq mi)

Population
  - Total: 3,158 (2021 census)
  - Density: 2,870/km^{2} (7,400/sq mi)
- Postcode: 4051
Suburbs around Gaythorne
Mitchelton	Everton Park	Everton Park
Mitchelton	Gaythorne	Enoggera
Enoggera	Enoggera	Enoggera

Gaythorne is a suburb in the City of Brisbane, Queensland, Australia. In the 2021 census, Gaythorne had a population of 3,158 people.

== Geography ==
Gaythorne is located seven kilometres north-west of the Brisbane central business district. It is bounded to the north by Kedron Brook. Gaythorne is situated on the slopes of Enoggera Hill. It shares some streets with the neighbouring suburb of Mitchelton. In the late 1990s it was split from Enoggera, a much larger suburb and they continue to share a postcode. It is a leafy, residential suburb with the dominant architectural style being "Queenslander" architecture. It adjoins the Enoggera Barracks and many of its streets are named after World War I sites.

Public transport facilities include Gaythorne railway station on the Ferny Grove railway line.

== History ==
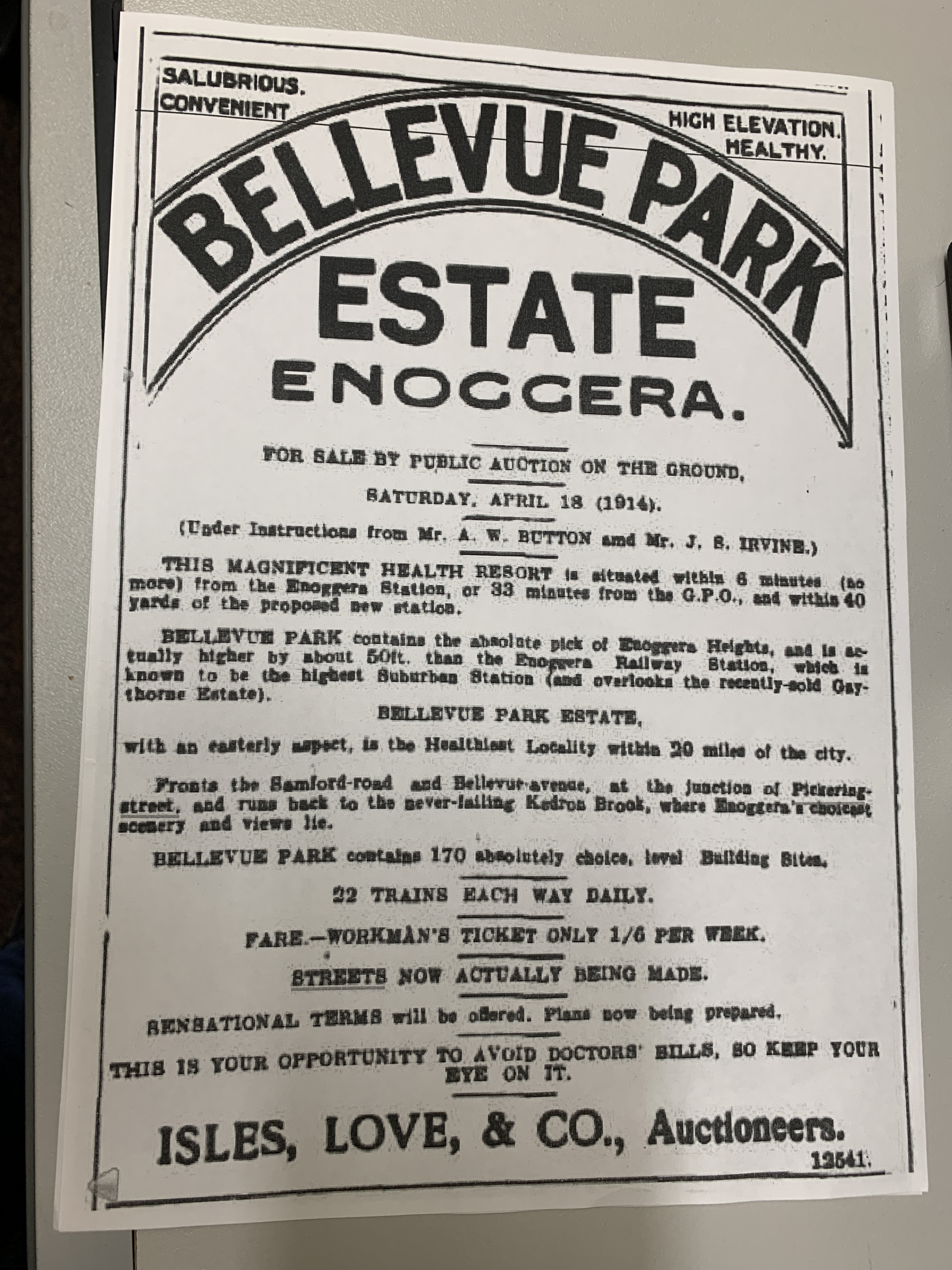
Bellevue Park Estate advertisement, 1914

The suburb takes its name from a property in the area owned by Howard Bliss.

On Saturday 15 May 1915 there was a stump capping ceremony for a new Presbyterian church at Enoggera (as the area was then called). The location was on the corner of Pickering Street and Station Avenue (27.4185°S 152.9859°E). In 1926 the church was extended to create a Sunday school. As part of the merger of many of the Methodist, Presbyterian and Congregational churches into the Uniting Church of Australia in 1977, the church became Gaythorne Uniting Church. However, falling congregation numbers led to a consolidation of Uniting churches in the area, leading to the closure of the former Presbyterian church. Since 2012, it has been used as an early education centre.

In May 1919, subdivided allotments of Rangeview Estate Enoggera were auctioned by Cameron Bros. This area was within the suburb of Enoggera. The map advertising the auction states that the Estate was within 5 minutes' walk away from the Rifle Range Railway Station, now known as Gaythorne Station. In April 1921, the land unsold was re-offered through auctioneers Cameron Bros as "Gaythorne & Rangeview Estates" made up of 53 allotments.

On Saturday 18 April 1924 auctioneers Isles, Love, & Co offered 170 residential lots in the Bellevue Park Estate in Enoggera Heights. It was described as fronting Samford Road and Bellevue Avenue at the junction with Pickering Street (27.4158°S 152.9837°E).

All Souls' Anglican Church was dedicated on 26 March 1961 by Archbishop Halse and consecrated on 9 March 1975 by Archbishop Arnott. Its closure was approved circa 1986. It was located at 10 Tel El Kebir Street on the corner of Heliopolis Parade (27.4166°S 152.9787°E), which is now within the neighbouring suburb of Mitchelton. As at 2020, the building is used as a child care centre.

From 2005 until 2022, the Queensland Family History Society had its library at 58 Bellevue Avenue (27.4153°S 152.9829°E) before relocating to Chermside.

== Demographics ==
In the 2011 census, Gaythorne recorded a population of 2,655 people, 51.6% female and 48.4% male. The median age of the Gaythorne population was 31 years of age, 6 years below the Australian median. 80.2% of people living in Gaythorne were born in Australia, compared to the national average of 69.8%; the next most common countries of birth were England 2.4%, New Zealand 2.2%, India 1.5%, Nepal 0.6%, Philippines 0.5%. 88.2% of people spoke only English at home; the next most popular languages were 1% Cantonese, 0.8% Mandarin, 0.7% Spanish, 0.6% Punjabi, 0.6% Nepali.

In the 2016 census, Gaythorne had a population of 3,023 people.

In the 2021 census, Gaythorne had a population of 3,158 people.

== Education ==
There are no schools in Gaythorne. The nearest government primary schools are Mitchelton State School in neighbouring Mitchelton to the north-west, Enoggera State School in neighbouring Enoggera to the east, and Everton Park State High School in neighbouring Everton Park to the north-east.
