= Mayne Junction railway station =

Former railway station in Brisbane, Queensland, Australia

Mayne Junction
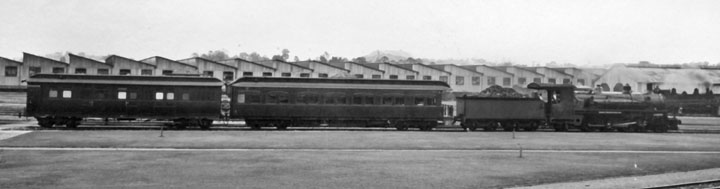
- Mayne Junction Railway Station 1890-1943, later known as Mayne Railway Station

General information
- Location: Mayne Road, Bowen Hills
- Coordinates: 27.4426°S 153.0377°E
- Owner: Queensland Rail
- Line: North Coast
- Platforms: 2 total (2 side platform)

History
- Opened: 1890
- Closed: 1971
- Former names: Mayne
Location

Mayne Junction railway station was a railway station in Bowen Hills, Brisbane, on the North Coast railway line of Queensland, Australia. It opened in 1890 as Mayne and was renamed Mayne Junction with the opening of a branch line to Enoggera (now the Ferny Grove line).The station was closed in 1971 to allow for the expansion of the nearby Mayne marshalling yards. The site of the station is now partly covered by the Inner City Bypass.
