= Ferny Grove railway station =

Railway station in Queensland, Australia

Ferny Grove
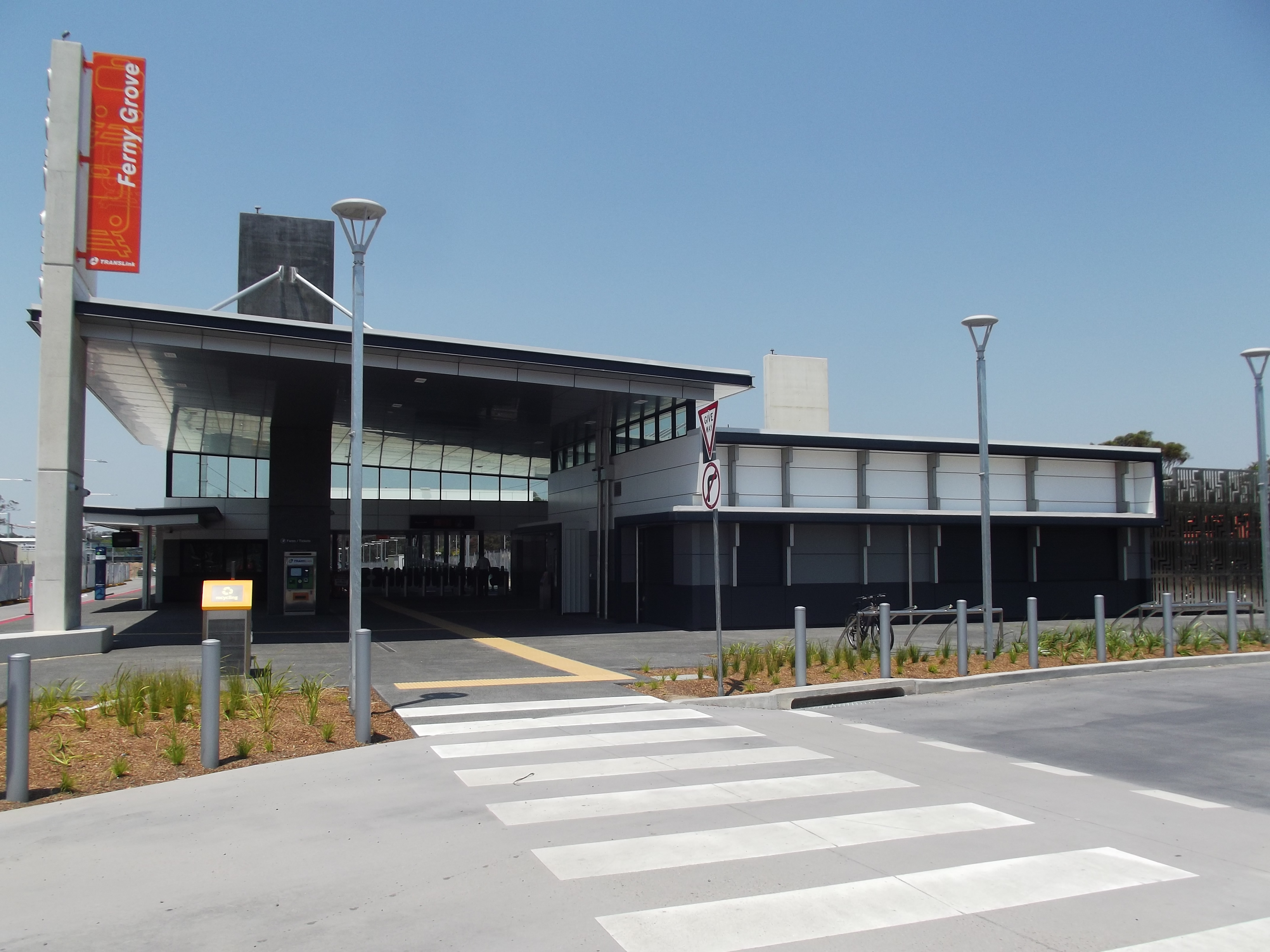
- Station front in October 2012

General information
- Location: Conavalla Street, Ferny Grove
- Coordinates: 27.4017°S 152.9356°E
- Owner: Queensland Rail
- Operator: Queensland Rail
- Line: Ferny Grove
- Distance: 16.08 kilometres from Central
- Platforms: 2 (1 island)
- Tracks: 2

Construction
- Structure type: Ground
- Parking: 539 bays
- Cycle facilities: Yes
- Accessible: Yes

Other information
- Status: Staffed
- Station code: 600389 (platform 1); 600390 (platform 2)
- Fare zone: Zone 2
- Website: Queensland Rail

History
- Opened: 29 June 1918
- Rebuilt: 2012

Services
| Preceding station | Queensland Rail | Following station |
|---|---|---|
| Keperra towards Beenleigh via Roma Street | Ferny Grove line | Terminus |
Location

Ferny Grove is a railway station operated by Queensland Rail on the Ferny Grove line. It opened in 1918 and serves the Brisbane suburb of Ferny Grove. It is a ground level station, featuring one island platform with two faces.

The Brisbane Tramway Museum is a short walk south of the station.

== History ==
The station opened in 1918 as part of the extension of the railway line to Samford and then extended to Dayboro in 1920. It was cut back to Ferny Grove in 1955, as part of a larger rationalisation by the Queensland Government of its railway lines. The line now terminates at Ferny Grove with bus services running to Samford during peak times.

The station was upgraded in 2012 as part of the Keperra-Ferny Grove duplication project. The upgrade included relocating the platform, a new station building and car park.

== Camp Mountain rail accident ==
The Camp Mountain rail accident occurred in 1947 west of Ferny Grove on the Dayboro stretch of the line. It is Queensland's worst railway accident. 16 people were killed when a picnic excursion train failed to negotiate a bend on the line between Camp Mountain and Samford. A small memorial marks the site of the accident.

== Services ==
Ferny Grove is the terminus for all stops services to and from Roma Street, Boggo Road (formerly Park Road), Coopers Plains and Beenleigh.

== Platforms and services ==
Ferny Grove platform arrangement
| Platform | Line | Destination | Notes |
|---|---|---|---|
| 1 | Ferny Grove | Roma Street (to Beenleigh line) | |
| 2 | Ferny Grove | Roma Street (to Beenleigh line) | |

== Ferny Grove Central Development ==
Honeycombes Property Group are developing the station to be Transit Oriented Development (TOD). Ferny Grove Staition is currently being redeveloped to improve parking, retail, add apartments and a public plaza directly outside of the station.

As of November 2023, the commuter car park has been completed with stage 2 construction underway, and expected to be opened in Q2 2026.

== Transport links ==
Transport for Brisbane operate three bus routes from Ferny Grove station:

- 367: to Upper Kedron
- 397: to Mitchelton via Everton Hills
- 398: to Mitchelton via Arana Hills

Brisbane Bus Lines operate one route from Ferny Grove station:

- 399 to Samford Village
