= Trinder Park rail collision =

1985 rail collision in Brisbane, Australia

Details
- Date: 23 March 1985; 6:48am
- Location: Woodridge, Queensland
- Coordinates: 27.62725°S 153.09984°E
- Line: Beenleigh line
- Operator: Queensland Railways
- Incident type: Head-on collision
- Cause: Disputed

Statistics
- Trains: 2
- Deaths: 2
- Injured: 31
- Damage: A$788,403

On 23 March 1985, two suburban trains travelling on the Beenleigh line collided head-on near Trinder Park railway station in the Brisbane suburb of Woodridge. Two people were killed, including one train driver and one passenger, while a further 31 people were injured.

== Accident ==
At around 6:48am on 23 March 1985, an electric multiple unit (EMU) passenger service travelling northbound to Roma Street departed Trinder Park railway station. As it accelerated out of the station onto the single-track section of the line, it collided head-on with an EMU travelling southbound to Beenleigh. At the point of the collision, the combined impact speed of the trains was at least 80 kilometres per hour (50 mph).

Two people on the southbound train – 54-year-old driver Herbert John Sheehan and 18-year-old passenger Paul Davis Cooper – were killed, while a total of 31 people across both trains were injuried. The driver of the northbound train, Warren Morriss, jumped clear moments before the collision and survived.

The two trains were meant to be four minutes apart, with the southbound service scheduled to be entering Trinder Park station and the northbound service pulling into Runcorn station. However, the northbound service was running four minutes' late at the time.

== Investigation ==
The cause of the collision is disputed. An initial investigation found the northbound train had passed a red signal (signal WR7) at Trinder Park station. Pat Dunne, the Queensland secretary of the Australian Railways Union, said in a statement that the crash may have been caused by cuts to staff and maintenance, although that was dismissed by transport minister Don Lane.

A board of inquiry was established following the collision, composed of three officers appointed by the Queensland Railways commissioner and three representatives elected by the company's employees. It met continually from 25 March 1985 until 3 April 1985, calling a total of 34 witnesses, including surviving crew members and passengers from both trains. The inquiry found that the signalling equipment, including the automatic warning system installed in the driver's cabin, was in working condition.

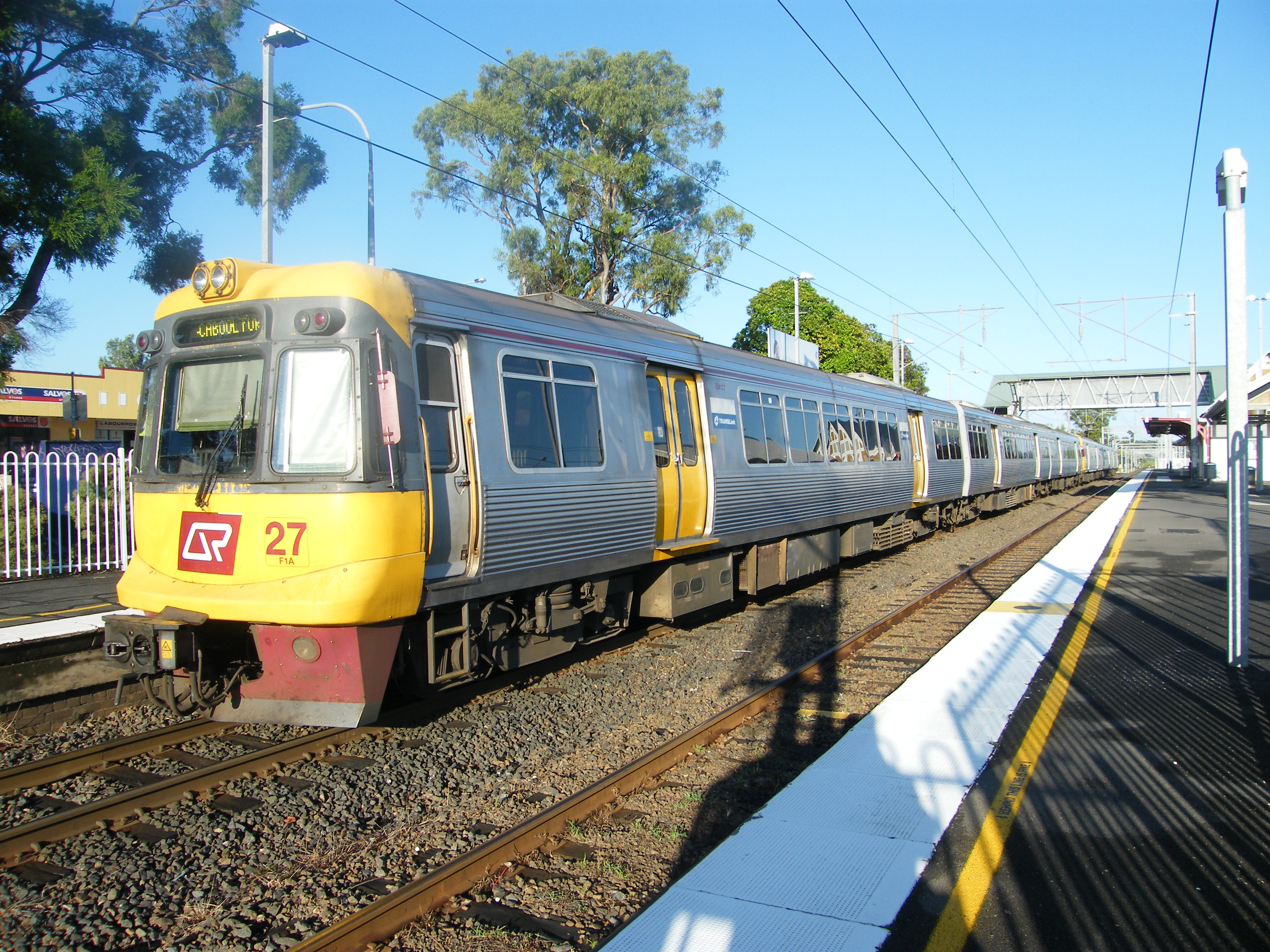
EMU 27 pictured in December 2008

Warren Morriss argued his northbound train had a green light to proceed down the single-track section of the line. He was cleared of two charges of manslaughter by a jury in 1986. In response, Lane released the findings of the inquiry tribunal, which reiterated the claim that Morriss' train passed a red signal. Signal WR7, which was semiautomatic, was replaced by signal B249, which is automatic. The track between Kuraby and Beenleigh was duplicated in 1995 in association with the re-establishment of the Gold Coast line.

The EMUs involved, EMU 11 and EMU 27, were both repaired by Walkers and returned to service in December 1985. Both remained in service until sometime between 2018 and 2025, when all EMUs were withdrawn from the Queensland Rail network.

At the time, there were a total of 28.8 kilometres (18 miles) of single-line track on the Brisbane suburban rail network. It was the first fatal rail accident in South East Queensland (SEQ) since electrification began in the 1970s; another fatal rail accident in SEQ did not occur until a woman died when her car was hit by a train at a level crossing in Wynnum West in February 2021.

== See also ==
- Railway accidents in Queensland
