= Fairfield railway station, Brisbane =

Railway station in Queensland, Australia

Fairfield
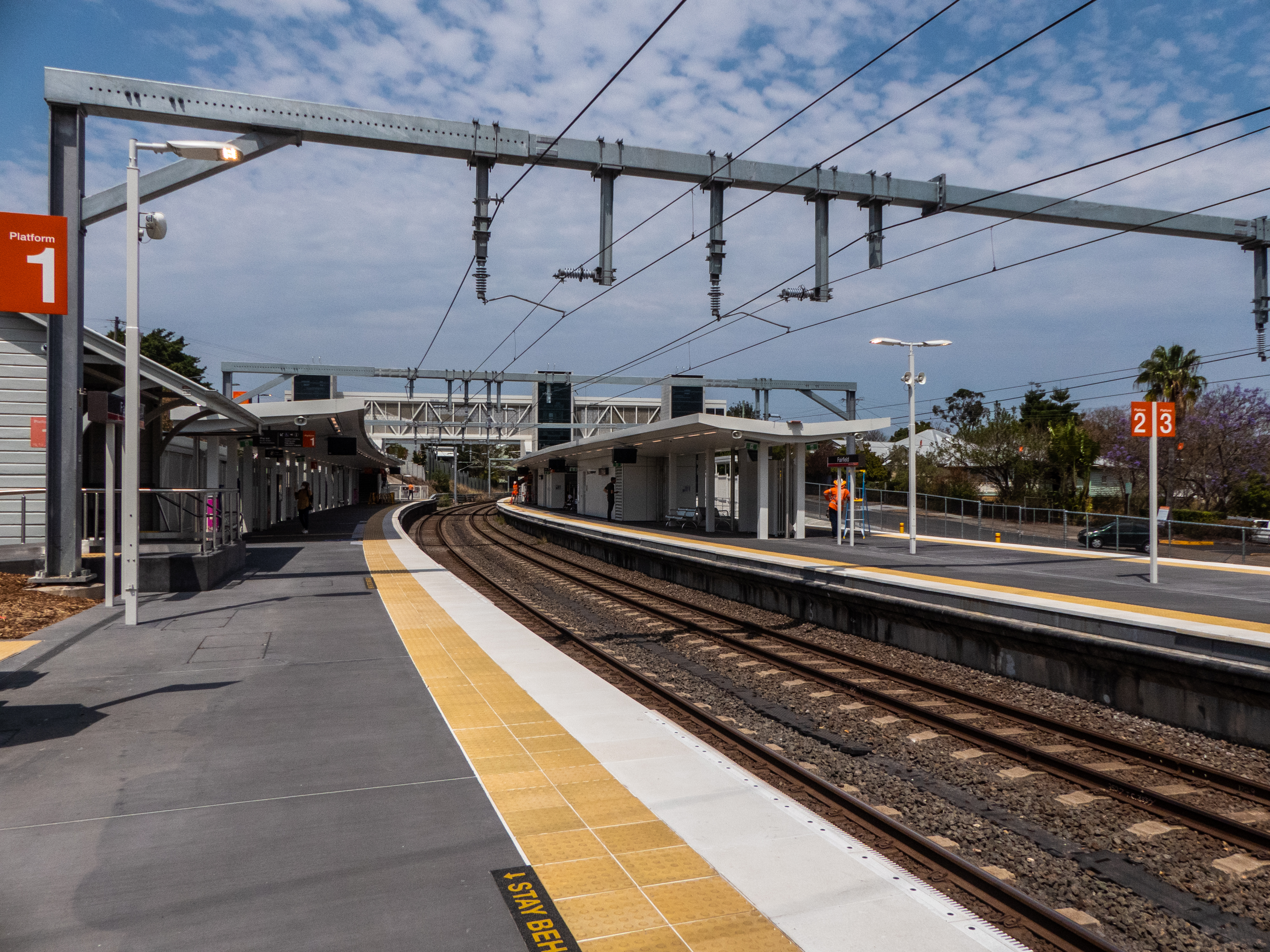
- Southbound view from Platform 1, October 2023

General information
- Location: Mildmay Street, Fairfield
- Coordinates: 27°30′35″S 153°01′40″E
- Owner: Queensland Rail
- Operator: Queensland Rail
- Line: T6 Beenleigh
- Distance: 7.08 kilometres from Central
- Platforms: 3 (1 side, 1 island)
- Tracks: 3

Construction
- Structure type: Ground
- Parking: 4 bays

Other information
- Status: Staffed part-time
- Station code: 600052 (platform 1); 600194 (platform 2)
- Fare zone: Zone 1
- Website: TransLink

History
- Opened: 1885; 141 years ago
- Rebuilt: 1895; 131 years ago, 8 January 2023; 3 years ago

Services
Preceding station	Queensland Rail	Following station
Dutton Park towards Ferny Grove via Roma Street	T6 Beenleigh line	Yeronga towards Beenleigh
Location

Fairfield is a railway station operated by Queensland Rail on the Beenleigh line. It opened in 1885 and serves the Brisbane suburb of Fairfield. It is a ground level station, featuring one island platform with two faces and one side platform.

== History ==
The first Fairfield railway station opened in 1885 and was on the south-east corner of the intersection of Fairfield Road and Victoria Street (approx 27.5063°S 153.0253°E). Following the 1893 Brisbane flood, the Fairfield Deviation resulted in the railway between Dutton Park and Yeronga being rebuilt to the east with the current station opening in 1895.

In September 1930, the standard gauge New South Wales North Coast line opened to the west of the station. In 1995, as part of the construction of the Gold Coast line, the standard gauge line was converted to dual gauge.

From 28 March 2022 until 8 January 2023, Fairfield Station was closed for major upgrade works as part of the Cross River Rail project. The works included a new third platform and new overpass including lifts. The heritage-listed waiting shelter on Platform 1 was to be removed temporarily, but later reinstated later in the project.

== Services ==
Fairfield station is served by all stops Beenleigh line services from Beenleigh, Kuraby and Coopers Plains to Bowen Hills and Ferny Grove.

Until June 2011, Fairfield was also served by services to Corinda via the Yeerongpilly–Corinda line.

== Platforms and services ==
Fairfield platform arrangement
Platform	Line	Destination	Notes
1	T6 Beenleigh	Beenleigh	
2	T6 Beenleigh	Roma Street (to Ferny Grove line)	
3	Not used for regular passenger services		
