= Altandi railway station =

Railway station in Queensland, Australia

Altandi
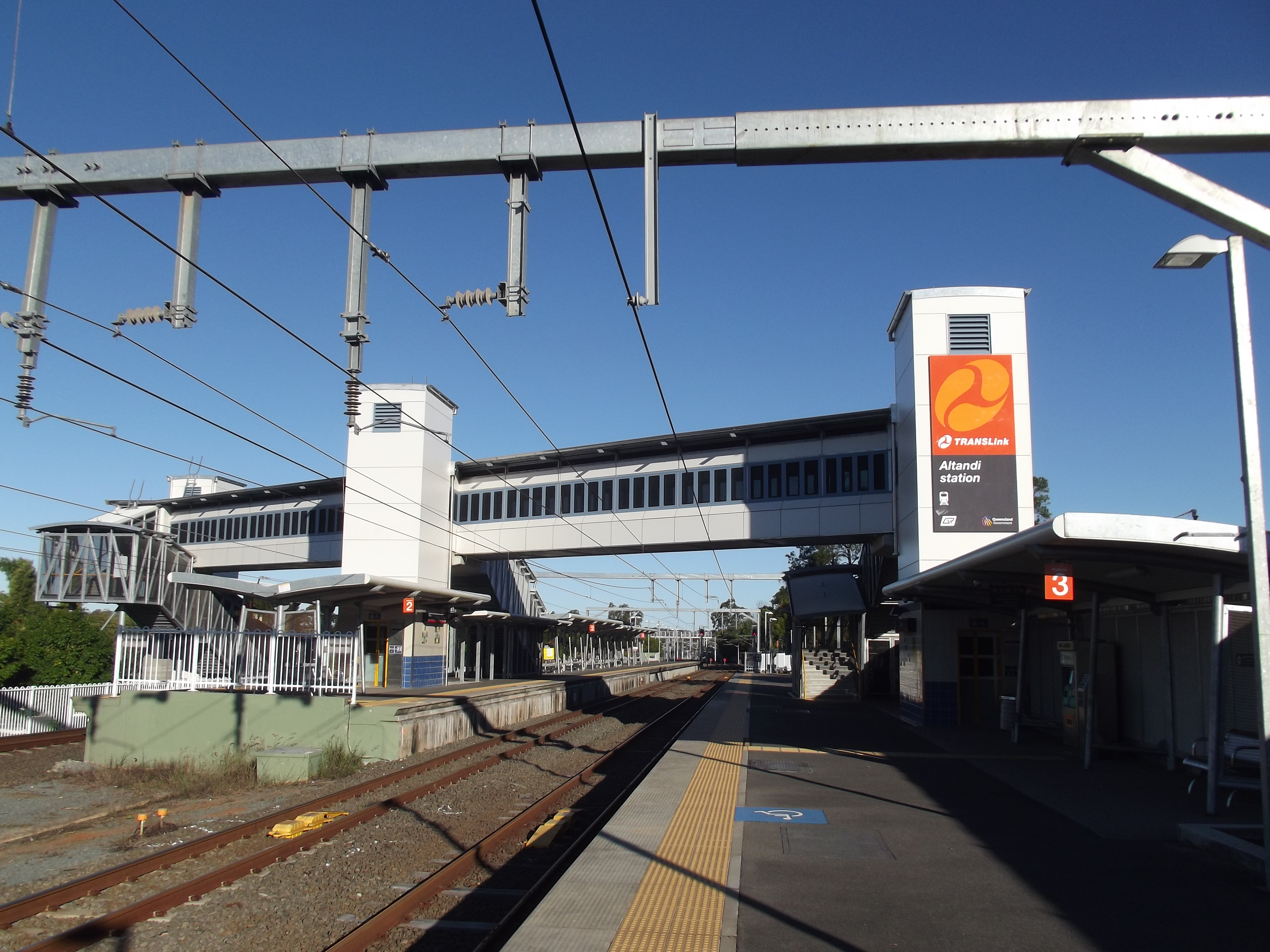
- Southbound view from Platform 3 in July 2012

General information
- Location: Mains Road, Sunnybank
- Coordinates: 27°34′56″S 153°03′48″E
- Owner: Queensland Rail
- Operator: Queensland Rail
- Lines: T6 Beenleigh; T5 Varsity Lakes
- Distance: 18.60 kilometres from Central
- Platforms: 3 (1 side, 1 island)
- Tracks: 3

Construction
- Structure type: Ground
- Parking: 103 bays
- Cycle facilities: Yes
- Accessible: Yes

Other information
- Status: Staffed part time
- Station code: 600212 (platform 1); 600213 (platform 2); 600214 (platform 3)
- Fare zone: Zone 2
- Website: Translink

History
- Opened: 18 July 1933; 93 years ago
- Rebuilt: 2008; 18 years ago

Services
Preceding station	Queensland Rail	Following station
Sunnybank towards Ferny Grove via Roma Street	T6 Beenleigh line	Runcorn towards Beenleigh
Boggo Road towards Domestic Airport via Roma Street	T5 Varsity Lakes line	Loganlea towards Varsity Lakes
Location

Altandi is a railway station in Australia operated by Queensland Rail on the Beenleigh and Varsity Lakes lines. It opened in 1933 and serves the Brisbane suburb of Sunnybank. It is a ground level station, featuring one island platform with two faces and one side platform.

In 2008, an upgrade of the station was completed as part of the Salisbury to Kuraby triplication project. This included converting the eastern platform to an island, and a new footbridge with lifts.

== History ==
A siding was lobbied for in the 1930s by the Runcorn Progress Association. A platform was first built at Altandi in 1933. It was officially named on 13 July 1934. The name was chosen based on an Aboriginal word for gum trees found in the area.

== Services ==
Altandi is served by all stops Beenleigh line services from Beenleigh and Kuraby to Bowen Hills and Ferny Grove. It is also served by limited stops Gold Coast line services from Varsity Lakes to Bowen Hills, Doomben and Brisbane Airport Domestic.

== Platforms and services ==
Altandi platform arrangement
Platform	Line	Destination	Notes
1	T6 Beenleigh	Beenleigh	
1	T5 Varsity Lakes	Varsity Lakes	
2	T6 Beenleigh	Roma Street (to Ferny Grove line); Beenleigh	Peak hours only
2	T5 Varsity Lakes	Varsity Lakes	One peak evening service only
3	T6 Beenleigh	Roma Street (to Ferny Grove line)	
3	T5 Varsity Lakes	Roma Street (to Airport line)	
