= Sunnybank railway station =

Railway station in Queensland, Australia

Sunnybank
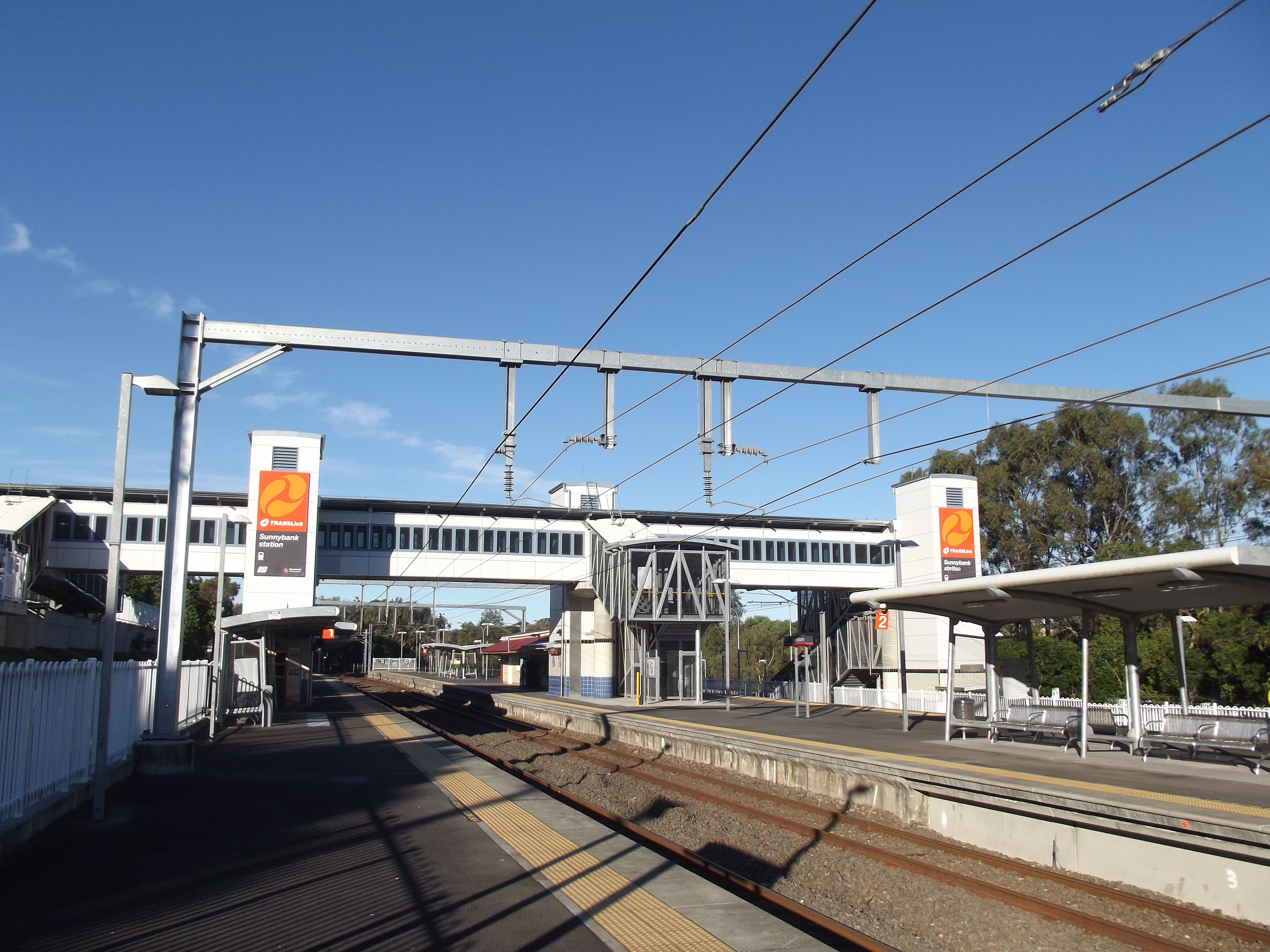
- Southbound view from Platform 1 in July 2012

General information
- Location: Dixon Street, Sunnybank
- Coordinates: 27°34′51″S 153°03′15″E
- Owner: Queensland Rail
- Operator: Queensland Rail
- Line: T6 Beenleigh
- Distance: 17.57 kilometres from Central
- Platforms: 3 (1 side, 1 island)
- Tracks: 3

Construction
- Structure type: Ground
- Parking: 231 bays
- Cycle facilities: Yes
- Accessible: Yes

Other information
- Status: Staffed part-time
- Station code: 600209 (platform 1); 600210 (platform 2); 600211 (platform 3)
- Fare zone: Zone 2
- Website: Translink

History
- Opened: 1885; 141 years ago
- Rebuilt: 2008; 18 years ago

Services
Preceding station	Queensland Rail	Following station
Banoon towards Ferny Grove via Roma Street	T6 Beenleigh line	Altandi towards Beenleigh
Location

Sunnybank is a railway station operated by Queensland Rail on the Beenleigh line. It opened in 1885 and serves the Brisbane suburb of Sunnybank. It is a ground level station, featuring one island platform with two faces and one side platform.

In 2008, an upgrade of the station was completed as part of the Salisbury to Kuraby triplication project. This included converting the western platform to an island, and a new footbridge with lifts.

== Services ==
Sunnybank station is served by all stops Beenleigh line services from Beenleigh and Kuraby to Bowen Hills and Ferny Grove.

== Platforms and services ==
Sunnybank platform arrangement
Platform	Line	Destination	Notes
1	T6 Beenleigh	Beenleigh	
2	T6 Beenleigh	Beenleigh	Peak hours only
2	T6 Beenleigh	Roma Street (to Ferny Grove line)	Peak hours only
3	T6 Beenleigh	Roma Street (to Ferny Grove line)	
