= Runcorn railway station, Brisbane =

Railway station in Queensland, Australia

Runcorn
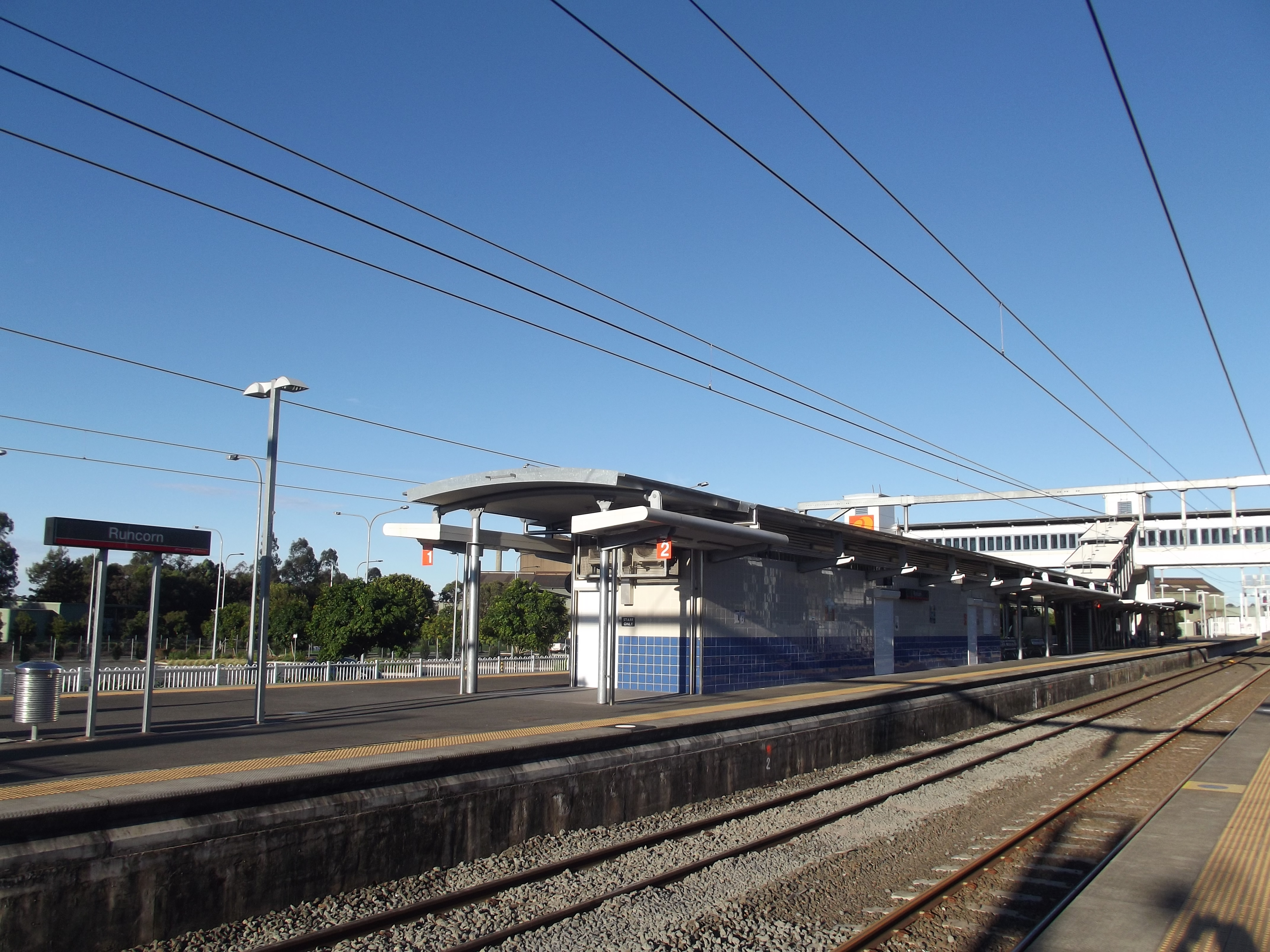
- Southbound view from Platform 3 in July 2012

General information
- Location: Beenleigh Road, Runcorn
- Coordinates: 27°35′33″S 153°04′07″E
- Owner: Queensland Rail
- Operator: Queensland Rail
- Line: T6 Beenleigh
- Distance: 19.79 kilometres from Central
- Platforms: 3 (1 side, 1 island)
- Tracks: 3

Construction
- Structure type: Ground
- Parking: 132 bays
- Cycle facilities: Yes
- Accessible: Yes

Other information
- Status: Staffed part time
- Station code: 600215 (platform 1); 600216 (platform 2); 600217 (platform 3)
- Fare zone: Zone 2
- Website: Translink

History
- Opened: 1885; 141 years ago
- Rebuilt: 2008; 18 years ago

Services
Preceding station	Queensland Rail	Following station
Altandi towards Ferny Grove via Roma Street	T6 Beenleigh line	Fruitgrove towards Beenleigh
Location

Runcorn is a railway station operated by Queensland Rail on the Beenleigh line. It opened in 1885 and serves the Brisbane suburb of Runcorn. It is a ground level station, featuring one island platform with two faces and one side platform.

== History ==
It opened in 1885 as part of the South Coast railway line. In 2008, an upgrade of the station was completed as part of the Salisbury to Kuraby triplication project. This included converting the eastern platform to an island, and a new footbridge with lifts.

== Services ==
Runcorn is served by all stops Beenleigh line services from Beenleigh and Kuraby to Bowen Hills and Ferny Grove.

== Platforms and services ==
Runcorn platform arrangement
Platform	Line	Destination	Notes
1	T6 Beenleigh	Beenleigh	
2	T6 Beenleigh	Beenleigh	Peak hours only
2	T6 Beenleigh	Roma Street (to Ferny Grove line)	Peak hours only
3	T6 Beenleigh	Roma Street (to Ferny Grove line)	
