= Woodridge railway station =

Railway station in Queensland, Australia

Woodridge
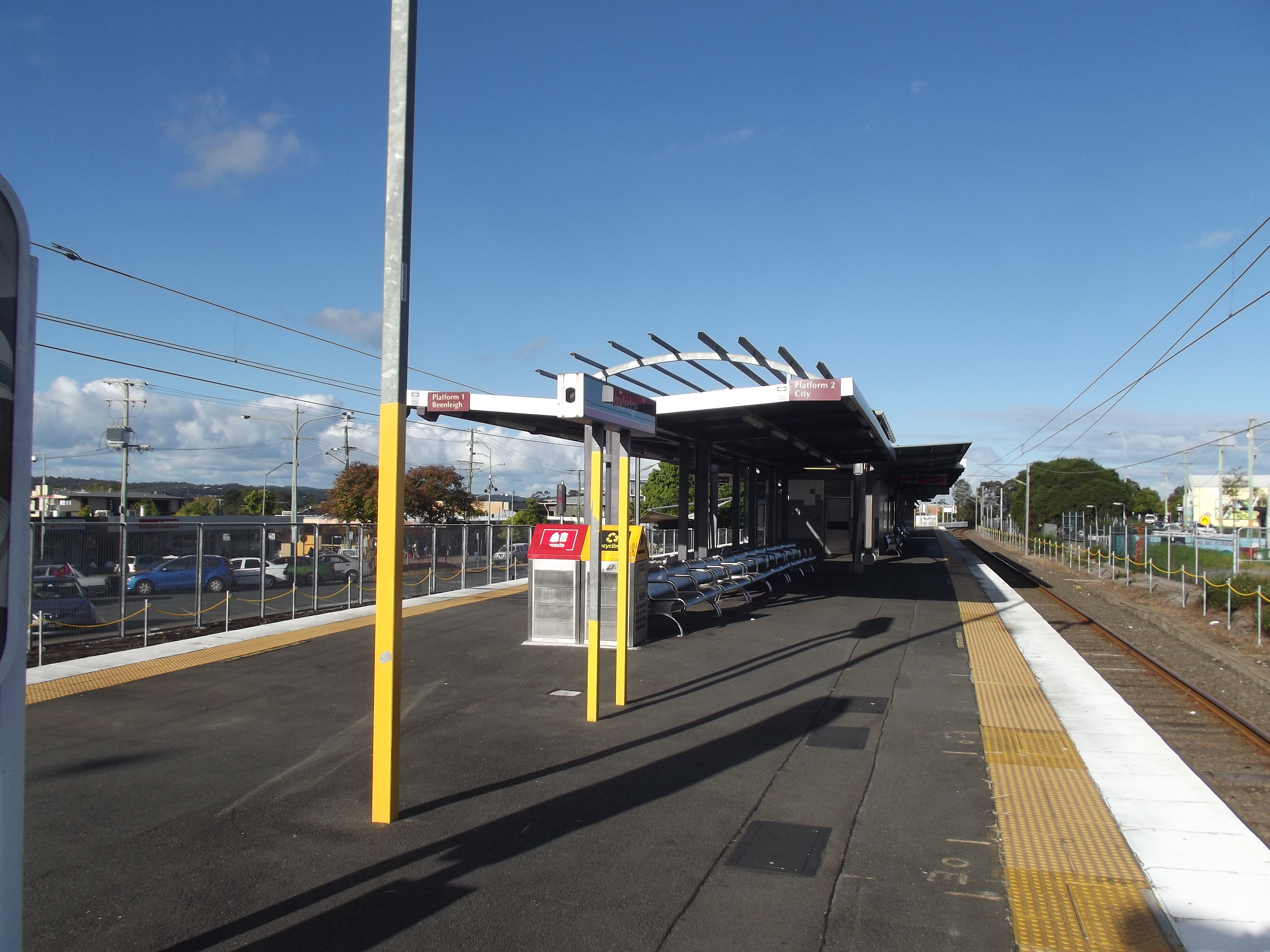
- Westbound view from Platform 2, July 2012

General information
- Location: Station Road, Logan Central
- Coordinates: 27°38′17″S 153°06′14″E
- Owner: Queensland Rail
- Operator: Queensland Rail
- Line: T6 Beenleigh
- Distance: 26.79 kilometres from Central
- Platforms: 1 island
- Tracks: 2

Construction
- Structure type: Ground
- Parking: 167 bays
- Cycle facilities: Yes

Other information
- Status: Staffed
- Station code: 600226 (platform 1); 600227 (platform 2)
- Fare zone: Zone 2
- Website: Translink

History
- Opened: 1885; 141 years ago
- Former names: 15 Mile Siding

Services
Preceding station	Queensland Rail	Following station
Trinder Park towards Ferny Grove via Roma Street	T6 Beenleigh line	Kingston towards Beenleigh
Location

Woodridge is a railway station operated by Queensland Rail on the Beenleigh line. It opened in 1887 and serves the Logan suburb of Woodridge. It is a ground level station, featuring one island platform with two faces.

== History ==
Woodridge station opened in 1885, providing an outlet for sawn timber. Graham's timber siding was opened in 1913, and in the next year another sawmiller subdivided land on the west side of the line and marketed it as the Woodridge estate. Though the Railways Department called it 15 Mile Siding. The siding was named Woodridge in January 1917, when the platform was made accessible to the public. As part of the Logan and Gold Coast Faster Rail project, the station will receive level crossing removals.

== Services ==
Woodridge station is served by all stops Beenleigh line services from Beenleigh to Bowen Hills and Ferny Grove.

== Platforms and services ==
Woodridge platform arrangement
Platform	Line	Destination	Notes
1	T6 Beenleigh	Beenleigh	
2	T6 Beenleigh	Roma Street (to Ferny Grove line)	
