= Edens Landing railway station =

Railway station in Queensland, Australia

Edens Landing
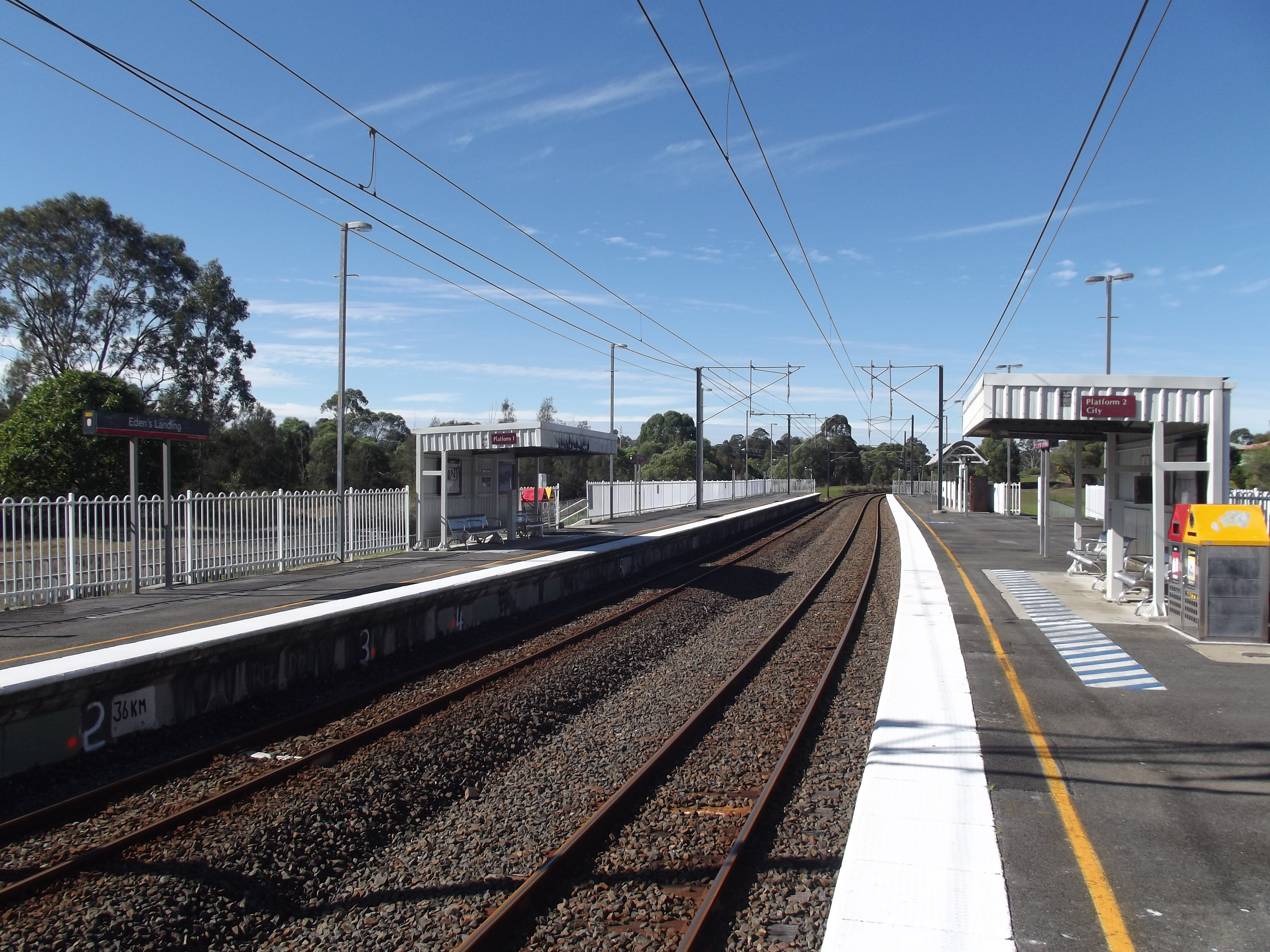
- Southbound view from Platform 2 in July 2012

General information
- Location: Eddy Avenue, Edens Landing
- Coordinates: 27°41′54″S 153°10′15″E
- Owner: Queensland Rail
- Operator: Queensland Rail
- Line: T6 Beenleigh
- Distance: 36.90 kilometres from Central
- Platforms: 2 side
- Tracks: 2

Construction
- Structure type: Ground
- Parking: 22 bays

Other information
- Status: Unstaffed
- Station code: 600235 (platform 1); 600236 (platform 2)
- Fare zone: Zone 3
- Website: Translink

History
- Opened: 1986; 40 years ago

Services
Preceding station	Queensland Rail	Following station
Bethania towards Ferny Grove	Beenleigh line	Holmview towards Beenleigh
Location

Edens Landing is a park and ride suburban railway station in Queensland, Australia, serving the suburb of Edens Landing in Logan City on the Beenleigh line. It is a ground level station, featuring two side platforms and is operated by Queensland Rail. It opened in 1986 and is one of nine stations being upgraded for the Logan and Gold Coast Faster Rail project to support the Brisbane 2032 Olympic Games.

== Description ==
The station is located off Eddy Avenue and consists of two side platforms, which are connected by a tunnel that goes beneath the station.

Platform 1 is located on the northern side, while platform 2 is located on the southern side of the station. Eddy Avenue is located on the southern side, where the car park is located. This side of the station also consists of a drop off zone, a ticket machine, and bike storage for commuters.

Both platforms have sheltered seating and help phones for commuters; the help phones are located in the middle of the platform on both platforms, while the sheltered seating differs between platforms. The sheltered seating on platform 1 is located in the middle of the platform, while platform 2 has sheltered seating towards both ends of the platform.

== History ==
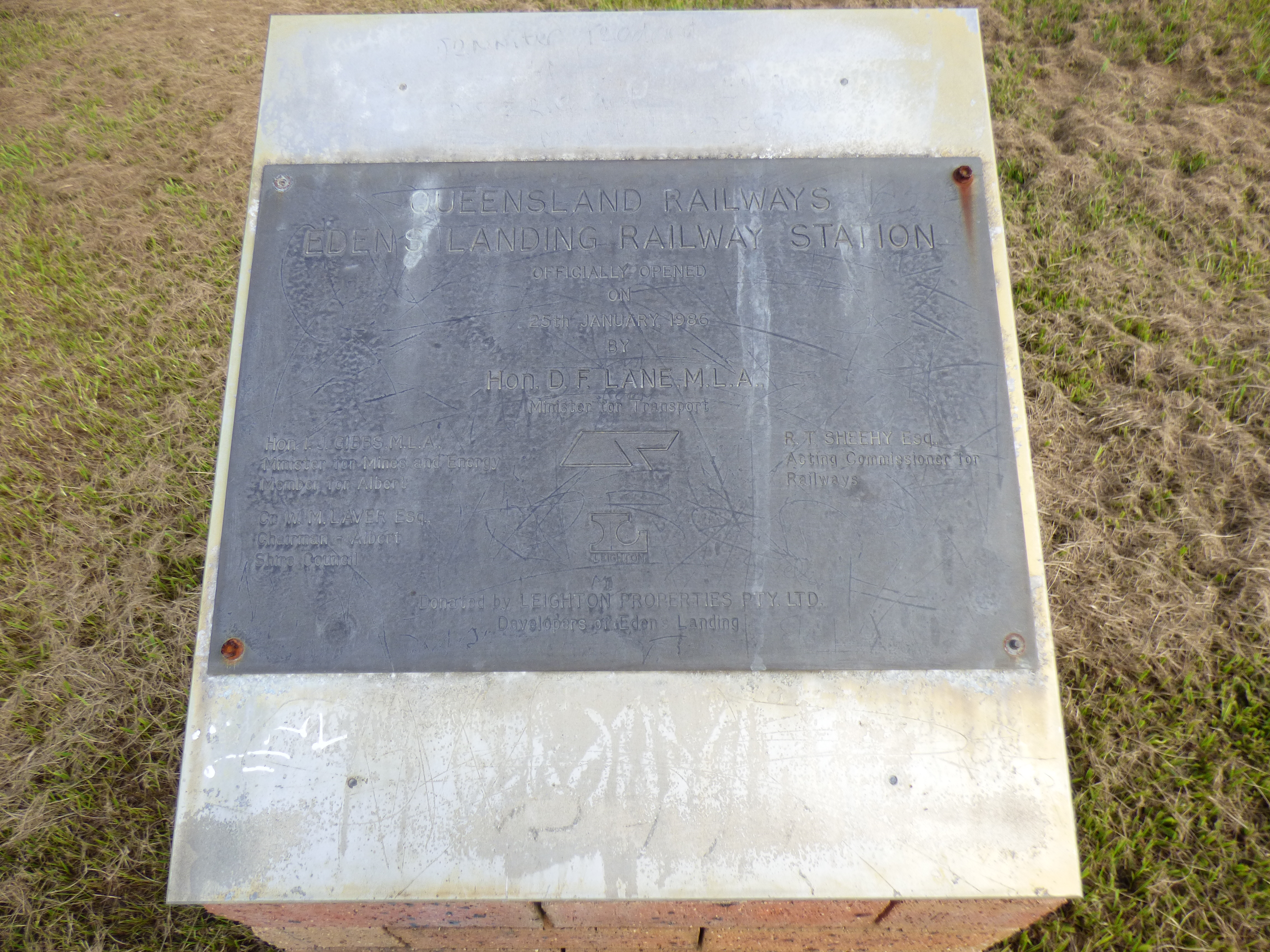
Edens Landing railway station commemorative plaque

The upgrade of the train services in the 1980s led Leighton Developers to pay for a station at Edens Landing. It was installed and named in about 1985, and was officially opened on 25 January 1986 by the Minister of Transport at the time, Don Lane. (Note: Taken from the plaque (pictured).)

On 21 April 1992, a second platform opened as part of the duplication of the line.

In 2011, recycling bins were added to the station's platforms as part of Queensland Rail’s Public Place Recycling program, which was introduced in 2010.

The Queensland Police Service used the station as a lesson for the general public on two separate occasions in 2018. The first occurred during February, when significant rainfall caused flooding in the area, particularly impacting the commute to the station. The police used the situation as a valuable opportunity to remind the public about flood safety, particularly advising motorists to avoid driving through floodwaters and reinforcing the message, 'If it’s flooded, forget it'. The second occurred in April, when the Queensland Police Service once again used the opportunity to educate the public, this time through a 'Lock It or Lose It' campaign. An officer conducted an inspection of the railway station car park, where the officer found one vehicle unlocked and others with valuables left in plain sight, highlighting the importance of securing personal property and the risks of both opportunistic and professional thieves.

== Incidents ==
In early June 2006, a man lost both of his legs at the station, although it was initially reported that he only lost one leg. After exiting a train, he rushed back and proceeded to cling to the exterior of the train and was unable to hold on after the train had begun moving and slipped. Passengers, who were standing on the platform, notified the Queensland Rail's control centre via the platforms help phone. The man was sent to Logan Hospital and then transferred to the Princess Alexandra Hospital. Services were disrupted for three hours and passengers were transferred to buses. A month later, in July, another incident occurred on or around the station, which resulted in the north and south bound services to be disrupted, resulting in stranded passengers being picked up by buses. It is unclear if these incidents were connected.

A man lost his life after being hit by an express train as it was going through the station in 2008.

=== Crime ===
In 2004, a man was assaulted by a group of youths after exiting a train at the station. He was sent to Logan Hospital, while the perpetrators fled the scene. Three years later, a similar incident occurred. In 2007, a man was followed home from the station and assaulted. He was sent to hospital with "life threatening head injuries", while the perpetrators (a 15-year-old and an 18-year-old) were charged with assault.

Between 1 July 2007 and 30 June 2008, Edens Landing station recorded a total of six crimes, including one vehicle-related crime (steal from/enter with intent), one drug offence, one weapons act offence, and three good order offences.

On October 16, 2019, two days after some coin hoppers were removed from a ticketing machine at Ormeau railway station, coin hoppers were removed from the Edens station. $1,095 was stolen with $22,874 being racked up in damage. The culprit was later identified and was sentenced to 12 months in prison with immediate parole.

In the 2021–2022 financial year, the station ranked among the top six locations for trespassing incidents on the Queensland Rail network, with 48 reported incidents.

== Station upgrade ==
The Logan and Gold Coast Faster Rail project will be doubling the number of tracks between Kuraby and Beenleigh, with modernised rail systems, station upgrades, and level crossing removals. The Edens Landing station is one of nine stations being upgraded or relocated due to the project. It is to address the increasing growth within the area and to support the Brisbane 2032 Olympic Games, while also allowing express trains to pass by without the need for all-stop trains being diverted to one side.

In November 2023, an upgraded station had been proposed, with community feedback being sought after. The Department of Transport and Main Roads reviewed the community feedback, which was held between November and December 2023. The findings were meant to be released in early 2024, but were not released until August 2024. The feedback given was to provide more parking spaces (a concept which has been discussed since at least 2010) and "active transport corridor connection points through the area" to be considered. The Department reviewed the project to ensure the balance between the demand for parking with the available land at the station, while "exploring connection points with the active transport corridor." The Department of Transport and Main Roads planned to release the updated station designs for Edens Landing in early 2026 for public feedback, which occurred during March, closing on 22 March 2026.

Contractors were expected to be appointed in late 2024, subject to government approvals, with construction timeframes to be confirmed following the appointment of the contractors. While works were initially expected to commence in 2024, with the completion date set for 2028, the start date for the Logan and Gold Coast Faster Rail project was delayed to mid-2025. It is unknown when construction will begin for the Edens Landing station.

== Services ==
Edens Landing is served by all stops Beenleigh line services from Beenleigh to Bowen Hills and Ferny Grove. The bus stop on Loane Drive (Stop ID 312171) replaces both the inbound and outbound services when the rail is out of commission.

== Platforms and services ==
Edens Landing platform arrangement
Platform	Line	Destination	Notes
1	T6 Beenleigh	Beenleigh	
2	T6 Beenleigh	Roma Street (to Ferny Grove line)	

== See also ==
- History of rail transport in Australia
- Rail transport in Queensland
