= Kingston railway station, Brisbane =

Railway station in Queensland, Australia

Kingston
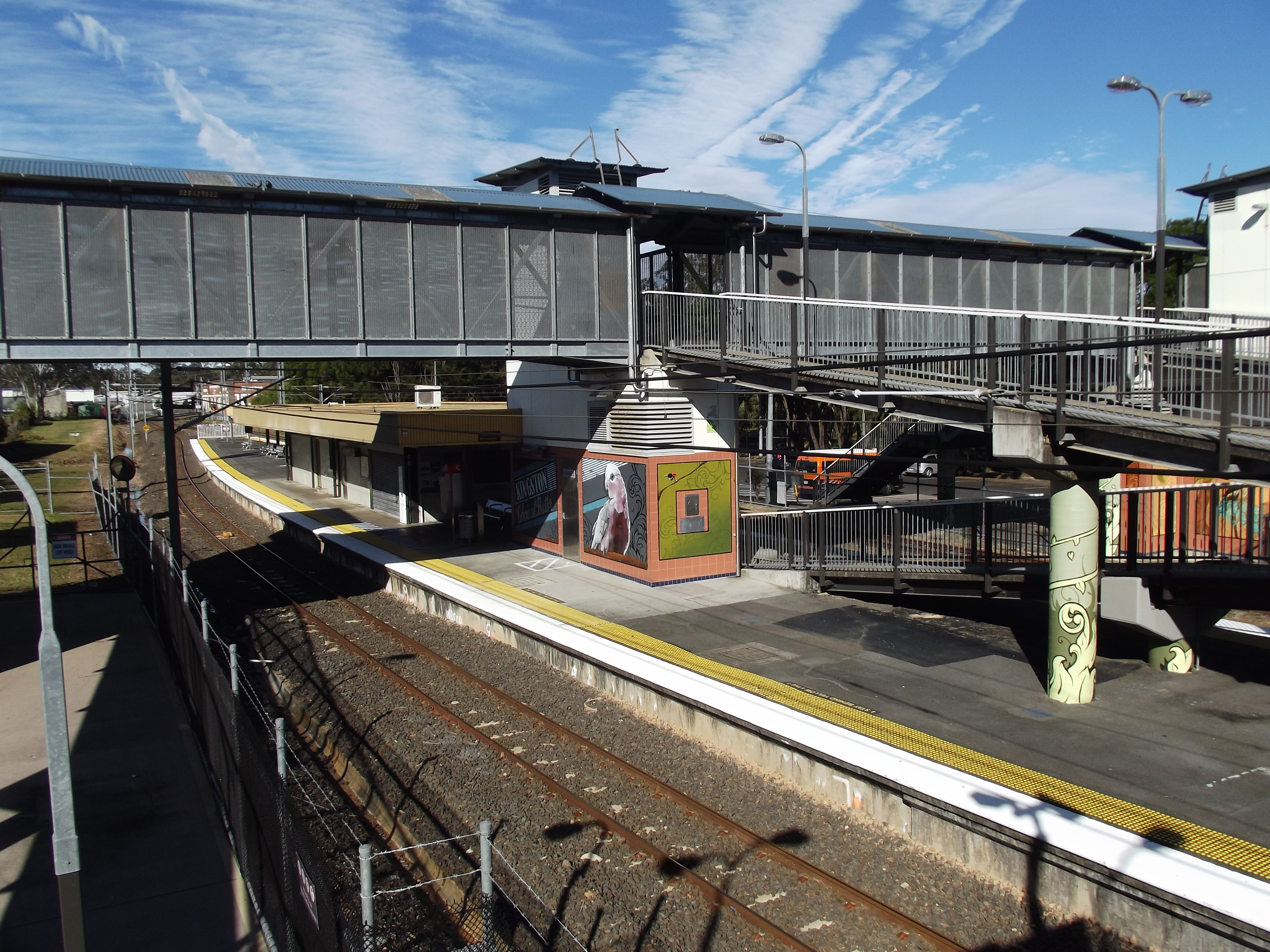
- Eastbound view of Platform 2 in July 2012

General information
- Location: Milky Way Street, Kingston
- Coordinates: 27°39′26″S 153°07′06″E
- Owner: Queensland Rail
- Operator: Queensland Rail
- Line: T6 Beenleigh
- Distance: 29.53 kilometres from Central
- Platforms: 1 island
- Tracks: 2

Construction
- Structure type: Ground
- Parking: 202 bays
- Cycle facilities: Yes

Other information
- Status: Staffed
- Station code: 600228 (platform 1); 600229 (platform 2)
- Fare zone: Zone 2/3
- Website: Translink

History
- Opened: 1885; 141 years ago

Services
Preceding station	Queensland Rail	Following station
Woodridge towards Ferny Grove via Roma Street	T6 Beenleigh line	Loganlea towards Beenleigh
Location

Kingston is a railway station operated by Queensland Rail on the Beenleigh line. It opened in 1885 and serves the Logan suburb of Kingston. It is a ground level station, featuring one island platform with two faces.

== History ==
The railway went through Kingston in 1885, The station was the central point of a town that initially developed about the stop.

== Platforms and services ==
Kingston station is served by all stops Beenleigh line services from Beenleigh to Bowen Hills and Ferny Grove.

Kingston platform arrangement
Platform	Line	Destination	Notes
1	T6 Beenleigh	Beenleigh	
2	T6 Beenleigh	Roma Street (to Ferny Grove line)	
