= Trinder Park railway station =

Railway station in Australia

Trinder Park
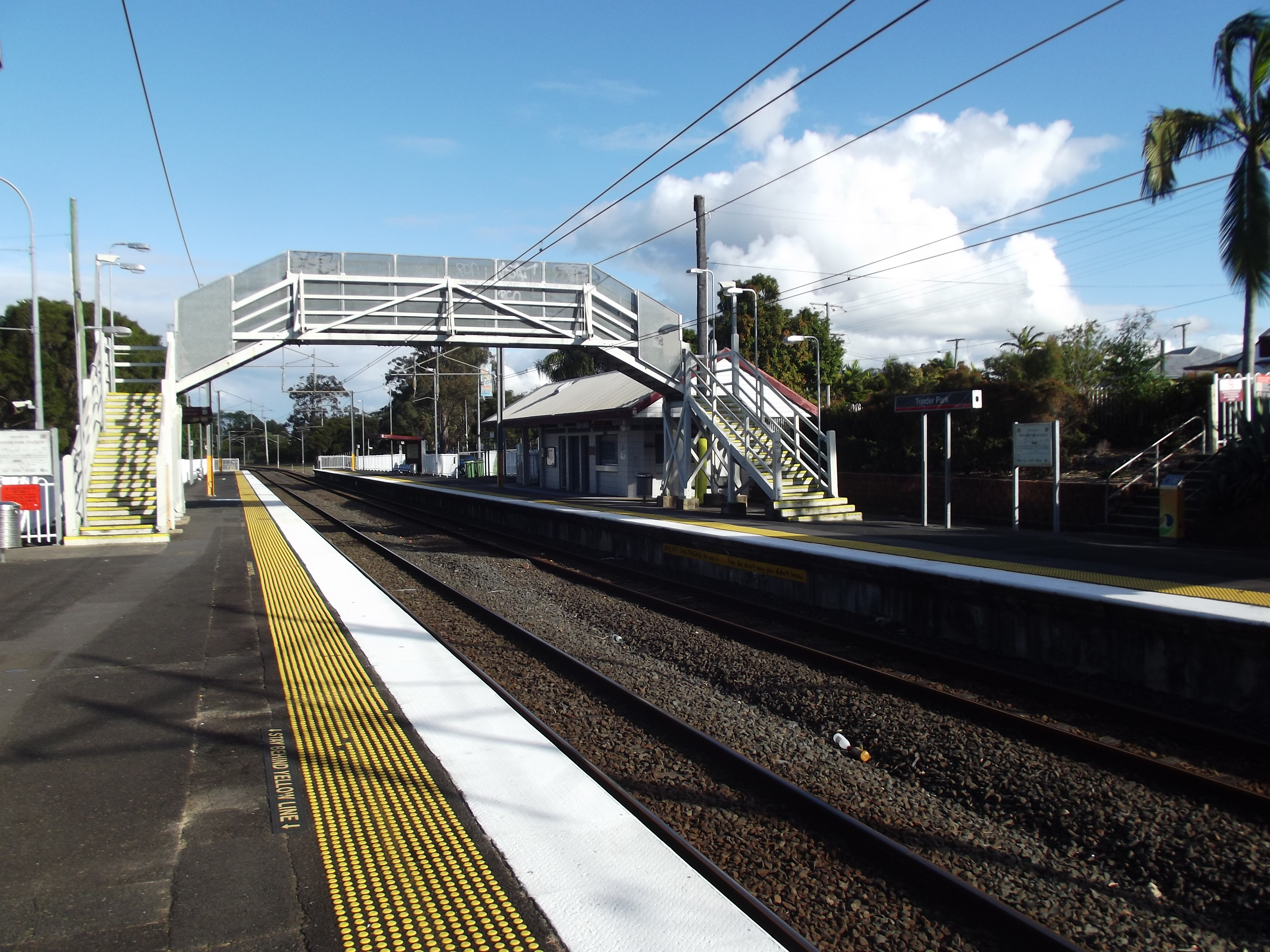
- Southbound view from Platform 1, July 2012

General information
- Location: Railway Parade, Woodridge; Australia
- Coordinates: 27°37′54″S 153°05′52″E
- Owner: Queensland Rail
- Operator: Queensland Rail
- Line: T6 Beenleigh
- Distance: 25.84 kilometres from Central
- Platforms: 2 side
- Tracks: 2

Construction
- Structure type: Ground
- Parking: 104 bays
- Cycle facilities: Yes

Other information
- Status: Staffed
- Station code: 600224 (platform 1); 600225 (platform 2)
- Fare zone: Zone 2
- Website: Translink

History
- Opened: 1868; 158 years ago

Services
Preceding station	Queensland Rail	Following station
Kuraby towards Ferny Grove	Beenleigh line	Woodridge towards Beenleigh
Location

Trinder Park is a railway station operated by Queensland Rail on the Beenleigh line. It opened in 1887 and serves the Logan suburb of Woodridge. It is a ground level station, featuring two side platforms.

== 1985 Trinder Park collision ==
On 23 March 1985, two EMUs collided head-on near Trinder Park. A train driver and a passenger were killed, and 31 others were injured. The units involved were EMU11 and EMU27; both were repaired and were retired in 2019 as part of the retirement and recycling program being undertaken by Queensland Rail.

== Gold Coast Logan Faster Rail ==
In 2021, it was announced the station was being relocated and the railway line be realigned to avoid slow winds in the route. This caused the resumption of numerous homes in Woodridge. The project aims to have rail transport be able to meet capacity during the 2032 Olympic Games by doubling the track capacity from two to four tracks between Kuraby and Beenleigh railway station.

== Services ==
Trinder Park is served by all stops Beenleigh line services from Beenleigh to Bowen Hills and Ferny Grove.

== Platforms and services ==
Trinder Park platform arrangement
Platform	Line	Destination	Notes
1	T6 Beenleigh	Beenleigh	
2	T6 Beenleigh	Roma Street (to Ferny Grove line)	
