= Runcorn, Queensland =

Runcorn
- Suburb
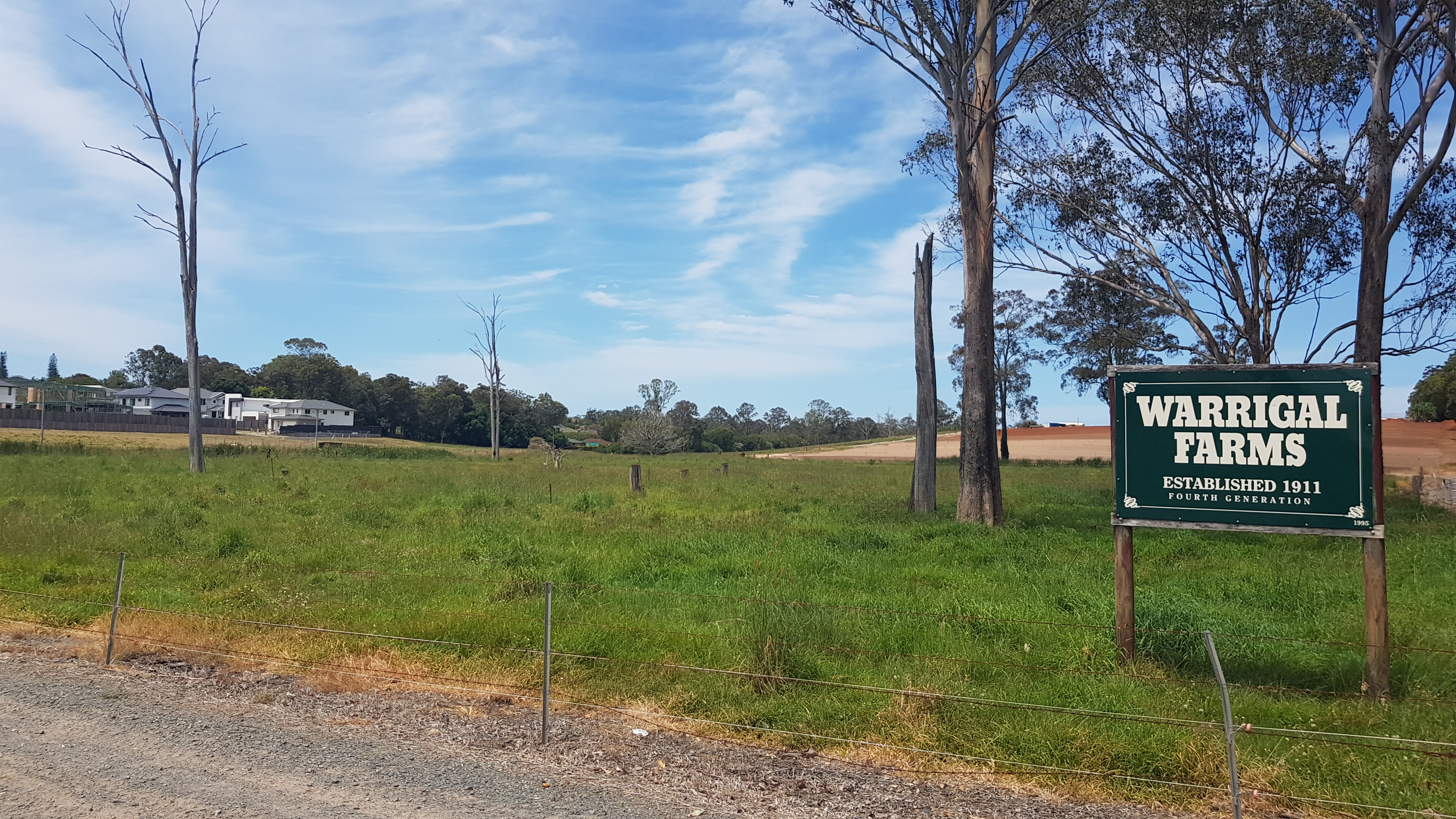
- Warrigal Farms, 2022

- Interactive map of Runcorn
- Coordinates: 27.5980°S 153.0794°E
- Country: Australia
- State: Queensland
- City: Brisbane
- LGA: City of Brisbane (Runcorn Ward)
- Location: 17.2 km (10.7 mi) SSE of Brisbane CBD
- Established: 1868

Government
  - State electorates: Stretton; Toohey
  - Federal division: Moreton

Area
  - Total: 6.5 km^{2} (2.5 sq mi)

Population
  - Total: 14,199 (2021 census)
  - Density: 2,184/km^{2} (5,660/sq mi)
- Time zone: UTC+10:00 (AEST)
- Postcode: 4113
Suburbs around Runcorn
Sunnybank	Eight Mile Plains	Eight Mile Plains
Sunnybank Hills	Runcorn	Kuraby
Calamvale	Stretton	Kuraby

Runcorn is an outer southern suburb in the City of Brisbane, Queensland, Australia. In the 2021 census, Runcorn had a population of 14,199 people.

== Geography ==
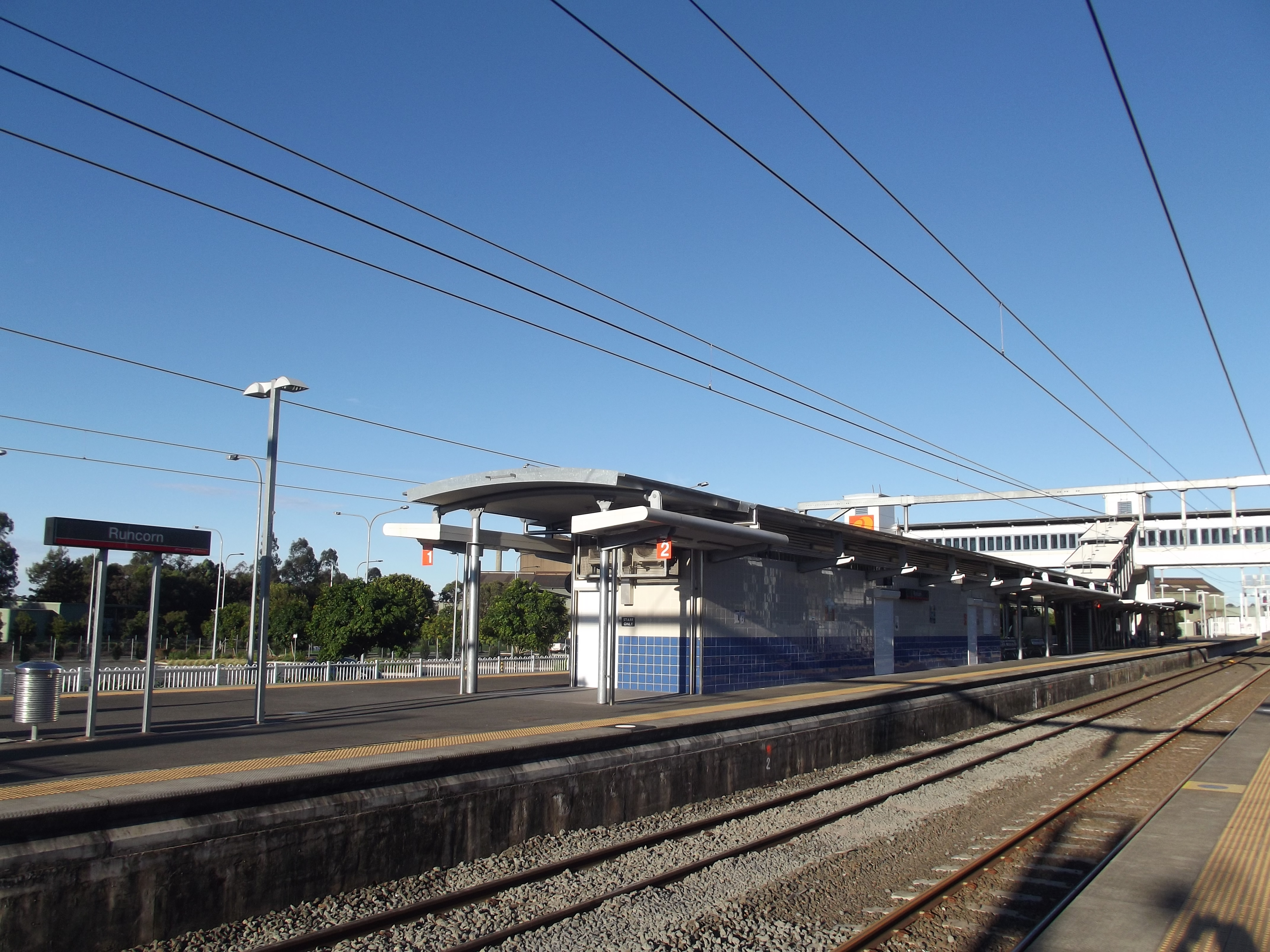
Runcorn Railway Station

Runcorn is 18.6 kilometres (12 mi) by road from Brisbane's central business district. Beenleigh and Warrigal Roads both run through the suburb, and are the primary links towards the Brisbane CBD and beyond. Much of the suburb is bordered by Bulimba Creek, with the secondary source for the creek rising within the suburb.

== History ==
The Jagera Aboriginal people occupied most of the land south of the Brisbane River; Runcorn would have been in the territory of the Chepara clan of Eight Mile Plains, Queensland.

Originally a part of Coopers Plains, the area was designated the Brisbane Agricultural Reserve (later the Eight Mile Plains Agricultural Reserve) . In 1868, the Williams family were the first to settle in the suburb, followed by Reverend J. McLaren a decade later. Rev. McLaren named his farm Runcorn, reportedly after Runcorn, Cheshire, England. Other early settlers include Mrs. Hill and Mr. Story.

Cotton was grown in 1870 which led to the growth of various small crops. The population remained small consisting mainly of fruit and vegetable farmers, the bone mill as well as a couple of chicken and dairy farms.

In May 1880 there was a subdivision called the Runcorn Estate, offering a mix of farm lots and town lots.

The Beenleigh railway line opened in 1885 with Runcorn railway station servicing the area.

In 1886, the Runcorn Bone Mill was started by Messrs Main, Clazy and Smith, with the fertiliser being used by farmers from regions as far away as New Zealand. At this time the local land was primarily used for farming.

Runcorn Bone Mill was started in 1886 by Messrs. Main, Clazy and Smith, and the fertilizer was used by farmers as far away as New Zealand. In 1888, a hundred pleasure seekers from Brisbane caught the train to Runcorn to explore and to visit the bonemill and Mr Williams' Greenhill Nursery. The roof of the mill was blown off by a violent storm in the 1890s. Australian Co-operative Fertilizers bought the mill for $500 in 1918. During the Second World War, the area was used by the United States Army and then by the British Navy. After the war it was converted to a sawmill and it later became the big foundry for Bradford Kendall (Bradken).

In 1890, a suburban estate called Runcorn Station Estate was sold, offering house lots close to the railway station.

Runcorn Provisional School opened on 8 July 1901. On 1 January 1909, it became Runcorn State School. The school's story began when a building committee was formed and requested a school be built in the area. An Inspector from the Department of Public Instruction decided that the applicants had established their claim for a Provisional School on the site selected, and that a school was needed. In 1901, Runcorn Provisional School opened with 26 pupils but no supplies or furniture. Miss Maud Fraser was the first teacher. As the enrolments grew, classes were held on the verandahs until more classrooms could be provided under the original building. In 1909, the department took over the running of the school and it became Runcorn State School. By 1929, there were nearly four hundred children enrolled. The numbers peaked in the mid 1970s to around 1100 students.

In May 1915, a subdivision of farm land was sold under the name of the Fruitgrove Estate.

Runcorn Progress Hall was built by Tom King in 1926. It was built of chamfer board with a galvanized iron roof and stumps provided by Mr Sirett. It has been a focus for the community for many years, with dances and euchre parties as well as many fund raising and social activities held there. The Methodist Church held services there until they acquired their own church. The hall is now owned by Pinelands Lions Club but is still used by a variety of groups.

During the Second World War, the area was used by the United States Army and then by the (British) Royal Navy.

The 1960s saw widespread development of the area and the population boomed over the following two decades.

Runcorn Heights State School opened on 28 January 1975.

Runcorn State High School opened on 28 January 1986.

The Queensland State Archives building at Compton Road was built in 1992 and opened in 1993. A second building, doubling the space, was opened in 2008.

== Demographics ==
In the 2016 census, Runcorn had a population of 14,592 people. Runcorn had the largest Sikh community (911 people; 6.2%) and the largest Indian Australian community (1,395 people; 7.7%) of any suburb in Queensland.

In the 2021 census, Runcorn had a population of 14,199 people, 50.0% female and 50.0% male. The median age of the Runcorn population is 34 years, 4 years below the Australian median of 38. 42.6% of people living in Runcorn were born in Australia, compared to the national average of 66.9%; the next most common countries of birth were China 9.9%, India 9.1%, Korea, Republic of 4.6%, Taiwan 3.8%, New Zealand 3.2%. 59.4% of people spoke only English at home; the next most common languages were 16.0% Mandarin, 8.1% Punjabi, 6.1% Cantonese, 5.3% Korean, 1.9% Vietnamese. The suburb had an unemployment rate of 6.6%. The median household income was $1,742 a week. The main occupations of the residents are vastly different and include professionals (23.3%), technicians and trades workers (13.2%) and clerical and administrative workers (12.0%).

== Education ==
Runcorn Heights State School is a government primary (Prep–6) school for boys and girls at 200 Nemies Road (27.6045°S 153.0696°E). In 2017, the school had an enrolment of 704 students with 48 teachers (44 full-time equivalent) and 33 non-teaching staff (21 full-time equivalent). It includes a special education program.

Runcorn State High School is a government secondary (7–12) school for boys and girls at 132 Hill Road (27.5926°S 153.0780°E). In 2017, the school had an enrolment of 769 students with 75 teachers (73 full-time equivalent) and 46 non-teaching staff (32 full-time equivalent). It includes a special education program.

Despite its name, Runcorn State School is now within the suburb boundaries of Sunnybank. However, Runcorn State School and also Warrigal Road State School in Eight Mile Plains provide schooling for children in the northern part of Runcorn.

== Amenities ==
Runcorn has several shopping centres. It is a very ethnically diverse area, and is also favoured by students due to its proximity to Sunnybank, and its low rental prices (compared to suburbs closer to the city). The suburb also has an electrical substation, operated by Energex, that provides power to approximately 11,000 properties in a variety of surrounding areas.

Warrigal Road Farm (established in 1911) is one of the oldest operating farms in the region with over 100 years of heritage. The Runcorn Horse and Pony Club continually plays an active role in the community offering a range of recreational opportunities.

The Brisbane City Council lists 33 parks maintained in the suburb. These include a range of facilities, varying from park to park and catering for picnics, barbecues, basketball, baseball, cricket and cycling. The city council also operates a public pool service within the suburb.

Runcorn is home to Souths United football club, who play in the Football Queensland Premier League.

Runcorn is also the location of the playing fields of St Laurence's College, which is located in South Brisbane. There are eight fields which are used for various sports including cricket, football and rugby. The Br Ryan Centre is a professional function centre that accompanies this site and offers professional kitchen facilities.

== Public transport ==
The main Brisbane – Gold Coast, Queensland/Beenleigh railway line runs through Runcorn. It is operated by Queensland Rail. Two stations, Runcorn and Fruitgrove, provide access to express and all stop services between Brisbane and Beenleigh. Brisbane–Gold Coast trains do not stop at Runcorn or Fruitgrove stations. These stations recently underwent extensive renovations, including line triplication.

The area is also serviced by Translink's 150 bus route, which runs approximately every 15 minutes between 6:00 am and 11:00 pm. (Other variations of this main bus route – including the 152, 153, 156, and P157 services – also pass through Runcorn but run less frequently.)

== Notable residents ==
Alfred Williams became the first settler in Runcorn in 1868. The family cleared the ironbarks and eucalypts and a dam was built on the east of what became known as Williams Park. The first house was built at the top of the rise, but this was subsequently sold and moved and a second house was built further down the slope. The Williams family established a nursery, Green Hill which specialised in rose and fruit trees. Alfred was a member of the Yeerongpilly Divisional Board for several years at the beginning of the twentieth century, and he donated many items to the museum. Mrs. Williams was the midwife for the village.

Lily Hair migrated from Belvedere, in England, to Brisbane in 1920. She married Bob Hair, a carpenter and timber cutter. She had met him when he was a soldier in England during the First World War. They settled in Beenleigh Road, Runcorn, and built a small house from timber they had milled themselves. They were founding members of the Progress Association and Lily walked the streets campaigning for electricity, while Bob raised funds for the RSL by running dance and euchre parties. Lily played the piano at the Progress Association hall. Lily began negotiating for a Post Office in the Runcorn area in 1927. In 1957, they finally got approval and they opened a small office in the front of their house. Lily continued to operate the post office until 1971. After their retirement they maintained their support of the Progress Association. Their daughter Beryl managed the Post Office after they left. Lily Hair died in 1988.

Gordon Olive studied at Brisbane Grammar, the University of Queensland and the RAAF College at Point Cook. He was a fighter pilot in England from 1937 to 1949 and rose to the rank of Wing Commander. In 1942 he became the chief instructor at the RAF College in Grangemouth before transferring back to the RAAF and active service. He retired in 1946. At that time he bought a small crops farm in Daw Road. He became a sales and marketing executive with Rheem and married in 1948. He was actively involved in Outward Bound and the Duke of Edinburgh Scheme, as well as raising horses and painting scenes from the Battle of Britain.
