= Beenleigh line =

Suburban railway line in Brisbane, Australia

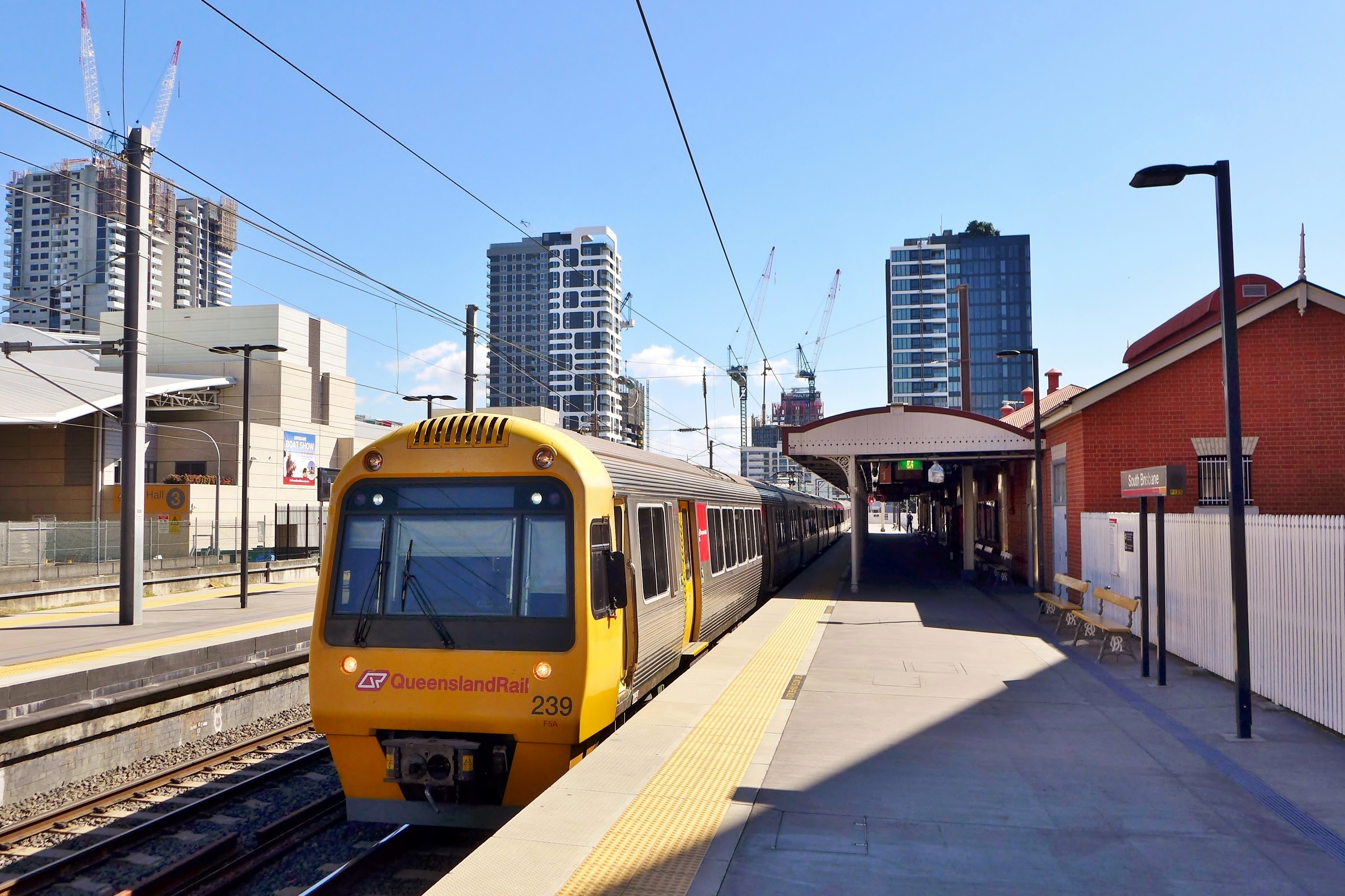
- Beenleigh-bound SMU at South Brisbane

Overview
- Status: Operational
- Owner: Queensland Rail
- Termini: Boggo Road; Beenleigh
- Stations: 22
- Website: queenslandrail.com.au

Service
- Type: Commuter rail
- Services: 8
- Route number: BDVL; BNBD; BRBN; BRVL; DBBN; FGBN; VLBR; VLDB
- Operator: Queensland Rail

Technical
- Line length: 41.595 km (25.846 mi)
- Track length: 41.595 km (25.846 mi)
- Number of tracks: Triple to Kuraby, double to Beenleigh.
- Track gauge: 1,067 mm (3 ft 6 in)
- Electrification: 1982–1984

The T6 Beenleigh line is a suburban commuter railway line in Brisbane, Queensland. Operated by Queensland Rail, the line runs for 40.9 kilometres (25 miles) from Beenleigh to Roma Street, where services continue on the Ferny Grove line.

== History ==
Originally known as the Logan railway line, the line opened to Loganlea in April 1885 being the first section of the South Coast line which was opened beyond Beenleigh to Southport in 1889.

The original city terminus of the line was Stanley Street, South Brisbane until a dual track line was constructed from Dutton Park to South Brisbane opposite the Victoria Bridge opening in 1891.

The railway originally approximately paralleled Fairfield Road between Dutton Park and Yeronga. Following the 1893 Brisbane flood, the Fairfield Deviation realigned the route above the flood level onto the current alignment. The line from Dutton Park to Yeerongpilly was duplicated at the same time.

The standard gauge line from Sydney which opened in 1930 was built parallel to the line from Salisbury to South Brisbane.

The section from Yeerongpilly to Kuraby was duplicated between 1950 and 1952.

With increasing popularity of the motor car, the South Coast line was closed beyond Beenleigh in 1964.

The opening of the Merivale Bridge in 1978 connected the Beenleigh (and Cleveland) line to the Brisbane CBD, and the line was electrified in 1982. The Merivale Bridge was converted to dual gauge in 1986 and standard gauge passenger trains now terminate at Roma St.

The Gold Coast line was progressively rebuilt on a new alignment south of Beenleigh from 1996. The section from Kuraby to Beenleigh was duplicated in association with the re-establishment of the Gold Coast line in 1995. The standard gauge line was converted to dual gauge and electrified at the same time, creating a third track as far as Salisbury. The third track was later extended from Salisbury to Kuraby in 2008.

On 10 August 2026, the Beenleigh line was numbered T6 (along with the Ferny Grove line) by Translink.

== Network and operations ==
=== Services ===
Most services stop at all stations to Roma Street railway station. The typical travel time between Beenleigh and Brisbane City is approximately 59 minutes (to Central). The line will use Cross River Rail once the project is completed, stopping at three new stations in Brisbane's inner city.

Passengers for/from the Gold Coast line change at either South Bank, Altandi, Loganlea or Beenleigh; Cleveland line change at Boggo Road; Ipswich and Rosewood lines at Roma Street; and all other lines at Central.

=== Stations ===
List of T6 Beenleigh line stations
T6 Beenleigh line
Station	Image	Suburb	Opened	Terrain	Connections	Time (Note: Travel time in minutes from Roma Street.)
	Continues from T6 Ferny Grove line					
Roma Street		Brisbane CBD	14 June 1875	Ground	Sunshine Coast line, Queensland Redcliffe Peninsula line Doomben Shorncliffe line Airport line, Brisbane Brisbane Metro Bus transport in Queensland	0
South Brisbane		South Brisbane	1884	Elevated	Cleveland line Gold Coast line Brisbane Metro Bus transport in Queensland	5
South Bank		South Brisbane	21 December 1893	Elevated	Cleveland line Gold Coast line Brisbane Metro Bus transport in Queensland	7
Boggo Road		Dutton Park	21 December 1891	Ground	Cleveland line Gold Coast line Brisbane Metro Bus transport in Queensland	10
Dutton Park		Dutton Park	1884	Ground	none	12
Fairfield		Fairfield	1885	Ground	none	14
Yeronga		Yeronga	1885	Ground	none	16
Yeerongpilly		Yeerongpilly	1884	Ground	none	18
Moorooka		Moorooka	1887	Ground	none	20 (Note: Moorooka has been closed since 2 March 2026 and is expected to reopen in late 2027.)
Rocklea		Rocklea	1885	Ground	none	22
Salisbury		Salisbury	1885	Ground	none	24
Coopers Plains		Coopers Plains	1885	Ground	none	27
Banoon		Sunnybank	1950	Ground	none	29
Sunnybank		Sunnybank	1885	Ground	none	31
Altandi		Sunnybank	1885	Ground	Gold Coast line	34
Runcorn		Runcorn	1885	Ground	none	36
Fruitgrove		Runcorn	1935	Ground	none	37
Kuraby		Kuraby	1935	Ground	none	39
Trinder Park		Woodridge	1968	Ground	none	44
Woodridge		Woodridge	1885	Ground	none	46
Kingston		Kingston	1885	Ground	none	50
Loganlea		Loganlea	1885	Ground	Gold Coast line	52
Bethania		Bethania	1885	Ground	none	56
Edens Landing		Edens Landing	25 January 1986	Ground	none	58
Holmview		Beenleigh	1885	Ground	none	61
Beenleigh		Beenleigh	27 July 1885	Elevated	Gold Coast line	64
