= Holmview railway station =

Railway station in Queensland, Australia

Holmview
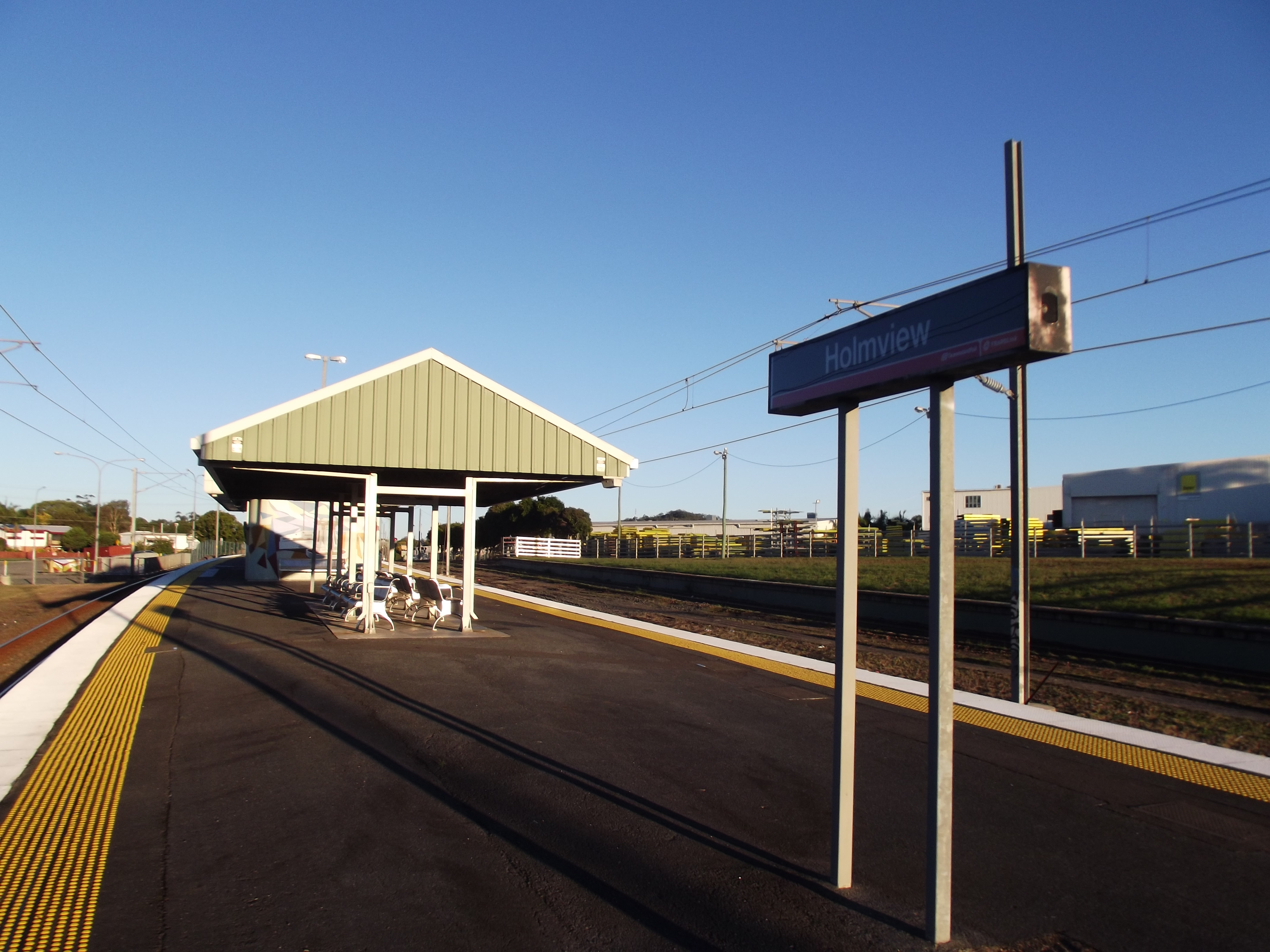
- Southbound view from Platform 2, July 2012

General information
- Location: Spanns Road, Beenleigh
- Coordinates: 27°42′34″S 153°11′15″E
- Owner: Queensland Rail
- Operator: Queensland Rail
- Line: T6 Beenleigh
- Distance: 39.09 kilometres from Central
- Platforms: 2 (1 island)
- Tracks: 2

Construction
- Structure type: Ground
- Parking: 66 bays
- Cycle facilities: Yes

Other information
- Status: Staffed morning peak
- Station code: 600237 (platform 1); 600238 (platform 2)
- Fare zone: Zone 3
- Website: Queensland Rail

History
- Opened: 1885; 141 years ago
- Former names: Holme View

Services
Preceding station	Queensland Rail	Following station
Eden's Landing towards Ferny Grove via Roma Street	T6 Beenleigh line	Beenleigh Terminus
Location

Homview is a railway station operated by Queensland Rail on the Beenleigh line. It opened in 1887 and serves the Logan suburb of Beenleigh. It is a ground level station, featuring one island platform with two faces.

== History ==
Holmview station opened in 1885 as Holme View. It was named Holme View because it had a view of the Loganholme area. The station was renamed Holmview shortly afterwards. In March 1987, the station was relocated to its current location. It served as the terminus of the Beenleigh line for the next year until the new Beenleigh station opened in March 1988. On 21 April 1992, a second platform opened as part of the duplication of the line.

== Services ==
Holmview station is served by all stops Beenleigh line services from Beenleigh to Bowen Hills and Ferny Grove.

== Platforms and services ==
Holmview platform arrangement
Platform	Line	Destination	Notes
1	T6 Beenleigh	Beenleigh	
2	T6 Beenleigh	Roma Street (to Ferny Grove line)	
