= Varsity Lakes line =

Passenger rail service in Queensland, Australia

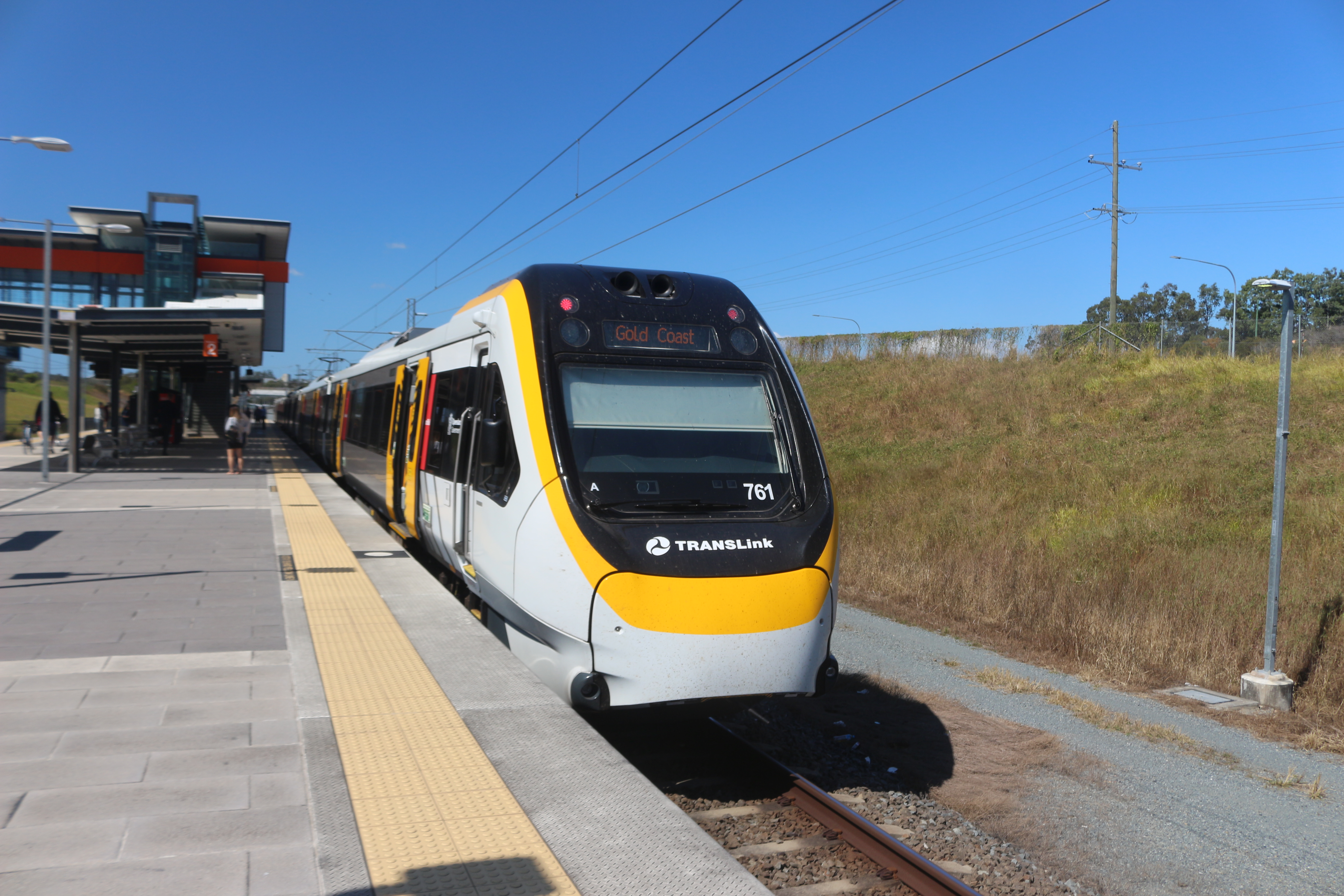
- NGR 761 arriving at Varsity Lakes in 2019

Overview
- Status: Operational
- Owner: Queensland Rail
- Locale: Gold Coast
- Termini: Roma Street; Varsity Lakes
- Stations: 19

Service
- Type: Commuter rail
- Operator: Queensland Rail
- Rolling stock: NGR

History
- Opened: 26 February 1996; 30 years ago

Technical
- Number of tracks: 2 (Roma Street–South Brisbane); 3 (South Brisbane–Kuraby); 2 (Kuraby–Varsity Lakes)
- Track gauge: 1,067 mm (3 ft 6 in)
- Electrification: 25 kV 50 Hz AC overhead lines, installed from 1996–2009

The T5 Varsity Lakes line is an interurban commuter railway line in South East Queensland. Operated by Queensland Rail, the line runs for 88.5 kilometres (55 miles) from Varsity Lakes to Roma Street, where services continue on the Brisbane Airport line.

The line was opened in February 1996, running from Beenleigh to Helensvale. It was extended twice in the late 1990s before a further extension in 2009 to its current terminus of Varsity Lakes. Since December 2017, the G:link light rail system has been connected to the railway at Helensvale.

== History ==
=== Background ===
The Beenleigh railway line opened in 1885 and was extended to Southport in 1889 as the South Coast line. A branch line to Tweed Heads in New South Wales was opened on 10 August 1903, with the first regular passenger train making the journey from Brisbane one month later. Because of the increasing popularity of the motor car, the Tweed Heads branch closed in 1961 and the line from Beenleigh to Southport closed in 1964.

=== New line ===
The new Gold Coast railway line opened on 26 February 1996, running from Brisbane to Helensvale. It was built as an extension of the Beenleigh line, running on a different alignment than the South Coast line. It was extended to Nerang in 1997 and to Robina in 1998.

In 2009, the line was further extended to Varsity Lakes. Before an upgrade in 2010, many passengers had to stand for much of the journey during peak-hour services.

Duplication works commenced in stages throughout the 2000s and 2010s. The final section to be duplicated was between Coomera and Helensvale, with work completed in late 2017 and the new track operational in 2018.

As part of the Cross River Rail project, three new stations were added to the line: Pimpama (opened in October 2025), Hope Island (opened in May 2026) and Merrimac (scheduled to open in 2026).

On 10 August 2026, the Gold Coast line was numbered T5 (along with the Brisbane Airport line) and renamed the Varsity Lakes line.

== Proposed extensions ==
A proposal to extend the line to the Gold Coast Airport terminal has existed in the airport's master plans since 2001. It was included in the South East Queensland Infrastructure Plan and Program of the Bligh Labor government, which was released in 2011. The airport's 2024 master plan stated that "the extension of heavy rail to Gold Coast Airport would provide further stimulus for promoting travel to and from the precinct via public transport".

In addition to Gold Coast Airport, three additional stations are planned at Tallebudgera, Elanora and Tugun, as part of a proposal to extend the line from Varsity Lakes.

== Network and operations ==
=== Services ===
Typical service frequency on the Varsity Lakes line is two trains per hour, with additional services running in peak hours. The timetabled travel time between Varsity Lakes and Roma Street station in Brisbane is approximately 83 minutes.

=== Route ===
Trains travel express between Boggo Road and Beenleigh, with stops at Altandi and Loganlea on the Beenleigh line. Most trains from the Gold Coast run through to Brisbane Airport as the Airtrain service, stopping at the International and Domestic terminals.

Prior to 20 January 2014, services on the line travelled express between South Bank and Beenleigh, stopping only at Boggo Road, Coopers Plains and Loganlea during off-peak hours.

The line will use Cross River Rail once the project is completed, stopping at three new stations in Brisbane's inner city.

=== Stations ===
List of T5 Varsity Lakes line stations
T5 Varsity Lakes line
Station	Image	Suburb	Opened	Terrain	Connections	Time (Note: Travel time in minutes from Roma Street.)
	Continues from T5 Brisbane Airport line					
Roma Street		Brisbane CBD	14 June 1875	Ground	Sunshine Coast line, Queensland Redcliffe Peninsula line Doomben Shorncliffe line Ferny Grove line Brisbane Metro Bus transport in Queensland	0
South Brisbane		South Brisbane	1884	Elevated	Cleveland line Beenleigh line Brisbane Metro Bus transport in Queensland	5
South Bank		South Brisbane	21 December 1893	Elevated	Cleveland line Beenleigh line Brisbane Metro Bus transport in Queensland	7
Boggo Road		Dutton Park	21 December 1891	Ground	Cleveland line Beenleigh line Brisbane Metro Bus transport in Queensland	10
Altandi		Sunnybank	18 July 1933	Ground	Beenleigh line	25
Loganlea		Loganlea	9 April 1885	Ground	Beenleigh line	38
Beenleigh		Beenleigh	27 July 1885	Elevated	Beenleigh line	48
Ormeau		Pimpama	29 February 1996	Sunken	none	55
Pimpama		Pimpama	20 October 2025	Ground	none	58
Coomera		Coomera	25 February 1996	Elevated	none	62
Hope Island		Helensvale	18 May 2026	Elevated	none	64
Helensvale		Helensvale	25 February 1996	Sunken		69
Nerang		Nerang	16 December 1997	Elevated	none	73
Merrimac		Merrimac	2026 (scheduled)	Ground	none	
Robina		Robina	31 May 1998	Sunken	none	79
Varsity Lakes		Varsity Lakes	13 December 2009	Sunken	none	83

== See also ==
- Beenleigh railway line
- G:link
