= Sunnybank, Queensland =

Sunnybank
- Suburb
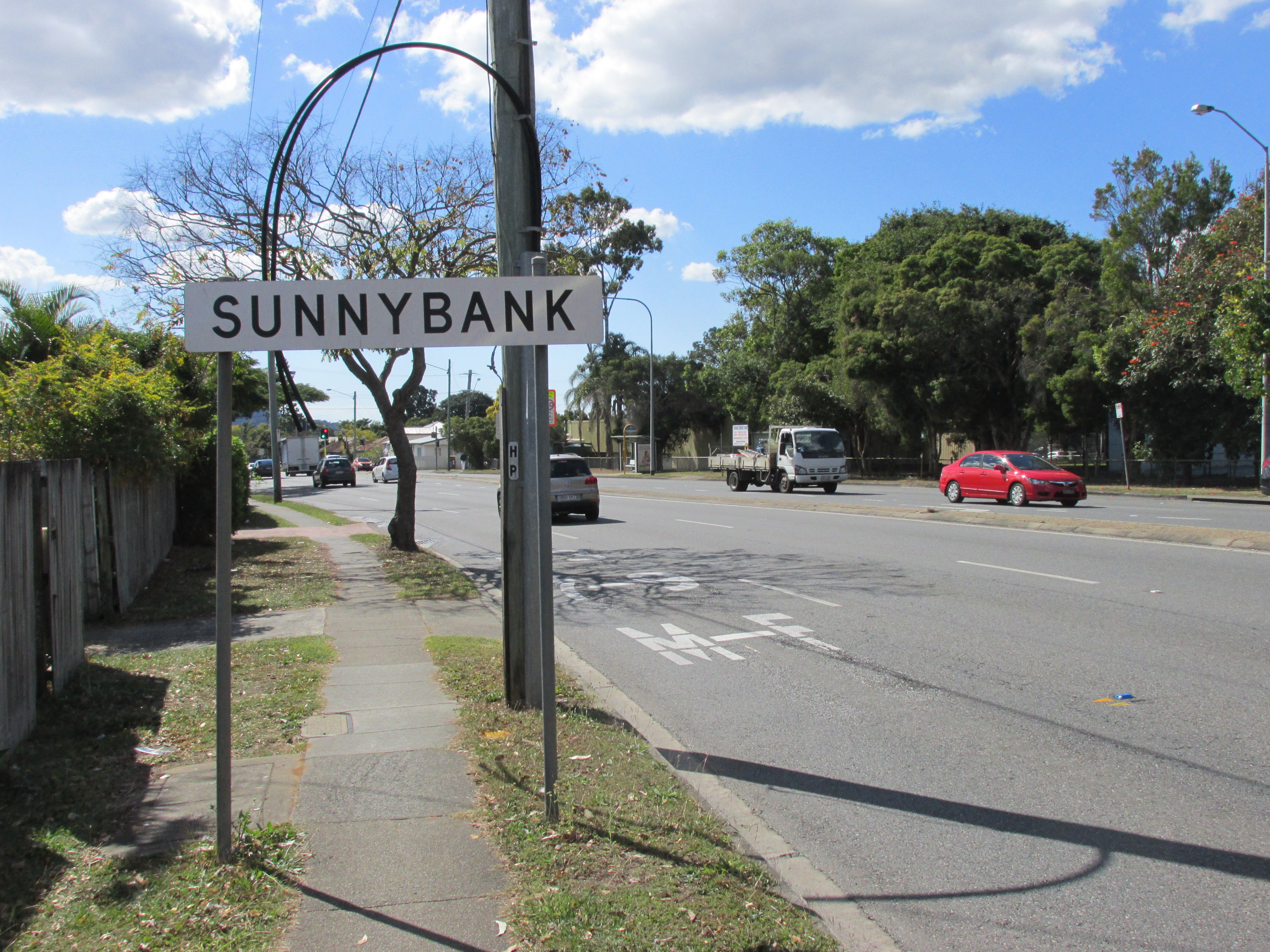
- Mains Road, Sunnybank, 2018

- Interactive map of Sunnybank
- Coordinates: 27.5819°S 153.0555°E
- Country: Australia
- State: Queensland
- City: Brisbane
- LGA: City of Brisbane (Runcorn Ward)
- Location: 10 km (6.2 mi) NW of Logan Central; 16 km (9.9 mi) SE of Brisbane CBD

Government
  - State electorates: Toohey; Stretton
  - Federal division: Moreton

Area
  - Total: 4.4 km^{2} (1.7 sq mi)
- Elevation: 73 m (240 ft)

Population
  - Total: 8,892 (2021 census)
  - Density: 2,021/km^{2} (5,230/sq mi)
- Postcode: 4109
Suburbs around Sunnybank
Coopers Plains	Robertson	MacGregor
Coopers Plains	Sunnybank	Eight Mile Plains
Acacia Ridge	Sunnybank Hills	Runcorn

Sunnybank is a suburb in the City of Brisbane, Queensland, Australia. It is known for its many Asian shops and restaurants. In the 2021 census, Sunnybank had a population of 8,892.

== History ==
The Jagera Indigenous people were the first to inhabit the area well over 20,000 years ago.

In 1885, the railway line was extended from Yeerongpilly, and names had to be given to the railway stations along the line. The name came from a property called Sunny Brae Estate owned by the Gillespie family, Sunnybank got its name when 2 acres (8,100 m^{2}) of land were taken over for the railway. Brae is Scottish for the English word bank, so the area was named Sunnybank. The Town of Sunnybank was surveyed in 1886, with 50 town and suburban land parcels offered for sale in 1887. It was within the local government area of Yeerongpilly Division (later the Shire of Yeerongpilly), then outside the City of Brisbane, until parts of the Shire (including Sunnybank) were amalgamated into the present City of Brisbane in 1925.

=== Development ===
On 21 June 1914 a group of adherents of the Church of Christ began holding services in private homes. The group purchased a block of land and cleared it. The congregation was formally established in April 1915 with 18 foundation members. The first church was erected in 1918 and moved to a more central location in 1922. By 1975 the church relocated to its present chapel and hall at 105 Station Road (27.5756°S 153.0552°E).

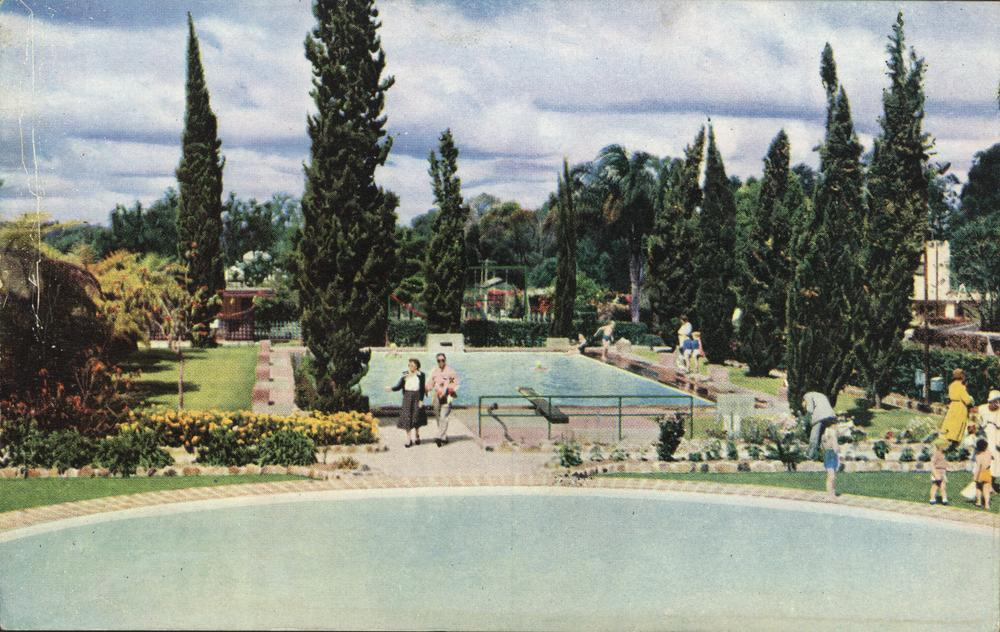
Oasis gardens and pools

Opening in 1938, The Oasis, with lush gardens, swimming pools and a mini zoo became Brisbane's most popular tourist attraction. The tropical gardens themselves attracted national and international attention. The Oasis's popularity really took off in 1942 when, during the Second World War, thousands of American military personnel stationed in Brisbane used the Oasis as a rest and recreation venue. It closed in 1989 due to declining patronage. The Oasis was located at 141 Station Road (27.5736°S 153.0563°E).

=== Asian influence on culture ===
Today, Sunnybank is a thriving multicultural community, with strong Asian influences in architecture, food, and culture.

== Demographics ==
In the 2021 census, Sunnybank had a population of 8,892 with 35% describing their ancestry as Chinese. This is followed by 18% describing their ancestry as English, and 13% as Australian. The ethnic Chinese community is extremely diverse with migrants born in Mainland China, Taiwan, Hong Kong as well as second and third generation Australians of Chinese descent. 39.3% of Sunnybank residents were born in Australia, followed by 17% in Mainland China and 7.5% in Taiwan, and 67% of residents had both of their parents born overseas. 38.2% spoke only English at home followed by the next most common languages: 26.7% Mandarin, 6.8% Cantonese, 3.1% Korean. The high use of Cantonese with Hong Kong not reflected in place of birth indicates that most residents of Hong Kong descent are second and third generation Australians.

In the 2016 census, Sunnybank had a population of 8,697, with 31.0% (the largest group) describing their ancestry as Chinese, 19.0% being born in China, 9.3% in Taiwan, and 2.6% in Hong Kong.

In the 2011 census, Sunnybank had a population of 8,091, 50.3% female and 49.7% male. The median age was 34 years, 3 years below the Australian median. 44.1% of people living in Sunnybank were born in Australia, compared to the national average of 69.8%; the next most common countries of birth were China 15.1%, Taiwan 7.1%, India 3.5%, New Zealand 2.8%, Vietnam 2.3%. 48% of people spoke only English at home; the next most common languages were 20.4% Mandarin, 7.4% Cantonese, 2% Vietnamese, 1.7% Korean, 1.6% Punjabi.

== Education ==
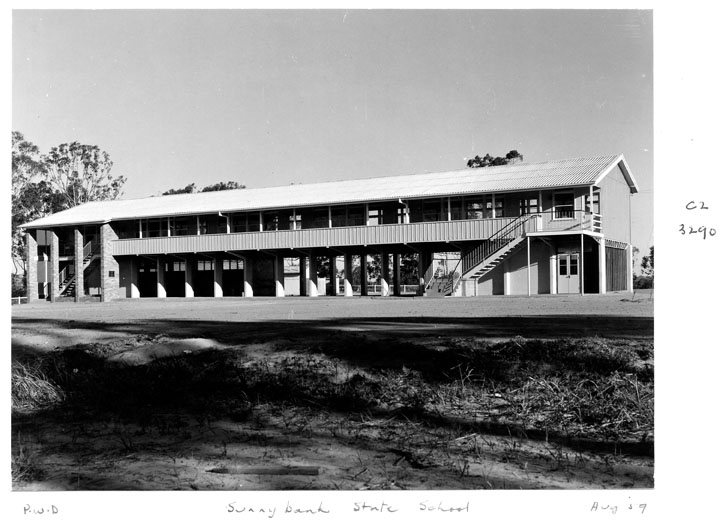
Sunnybank State School, 1959

Sunnybank State School is a government primary (Prep–6) school for boys and girls at 50 Eddington Street (27.5756°S 153.0514°E). It includes a Special Education Program. In 2017, the school had an enrolment of 340 students with 27 teachers (22 full-time equivalent) and 19 non-teaching staff (11 full-time equivalent).

Despite its name, Runcorn State School is a government primary (Prep–6) school for boys and girls at 646 Beenleigh Road in Sunnybank (27.5881°S 153.0621°E). It includes a Special Education Program and a Special Education Unit. In 2017, the school had an enrolment of 437 students with 33 teachers (27 full-time equivalent) and 19 non-teaching staff (12 full-time equivalent).

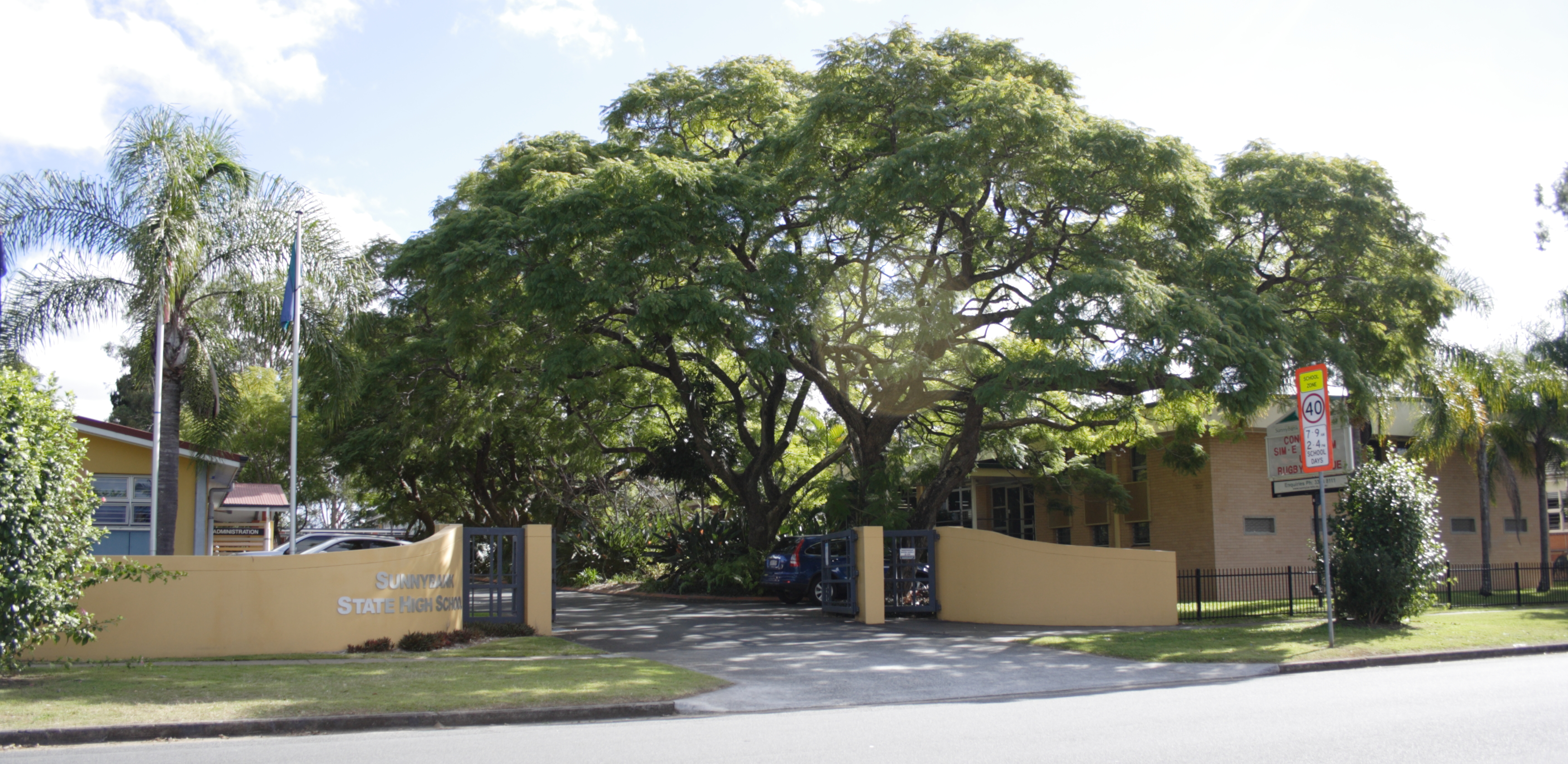
Boorman Street entrance, Sunnybank State High School, 2012

Sunnybank State High School is a government secondary (7–12) school for boys and girls at Boorman Street (27.5762°S 153.0597°E). It includes the Sunnybank Special Education Unit. In 2017, the school had an enrolment of 664 students with 67 teachers (63 full-time equivalent) and 42 non-teaching staff (32 full-time equivalent).

Sunnybank Special School is a special primary and secondary (Early Childhood–12) school for boys and girls at 79 Troughton Road (27.5721°S 153.0483°E). It includes an Early Childhood Development Program. In 2017, the school had an enrolment of 38 students with 14 teachers (11 full-time equivalent) and 17 non-teaching staff (10 full-time equivalent).

Our Lady of Lourdes Primary School is a Catholic primary (Prep–6) school for boys and girls at Shearwin Street (27.5816°S 153.0619°E). In 2017, the school had an enrolment of 509 students with 37 teachers (31 full-time equivalent) and 15 non-teaching staff (10 full-time equivalent).

St Thomas More College is a Catholic secondary (7–12) school for boys and girls at the corner of Troughton Road & Turton Street (27.5737°S 153.0489°E). In 2017, the school had an enrolment of 1012 students with 75 teachers (74 full-time equivalent) and 34 non-teaching staff (27 full-time equivalent).

Carinity Education is a private secondary (7–12) school for girls at 153 Lister Street (27.5778°S 153.0547°E). The school provides a supportive individual learning environment for girls who have difficulties with mainstream schooling. In 2017, the school had an enrolment of 114 students with 10 teachers (8 full-time equivalent) and 18 non-teaching staff (14 full-time equivalent).

== Amenities ==
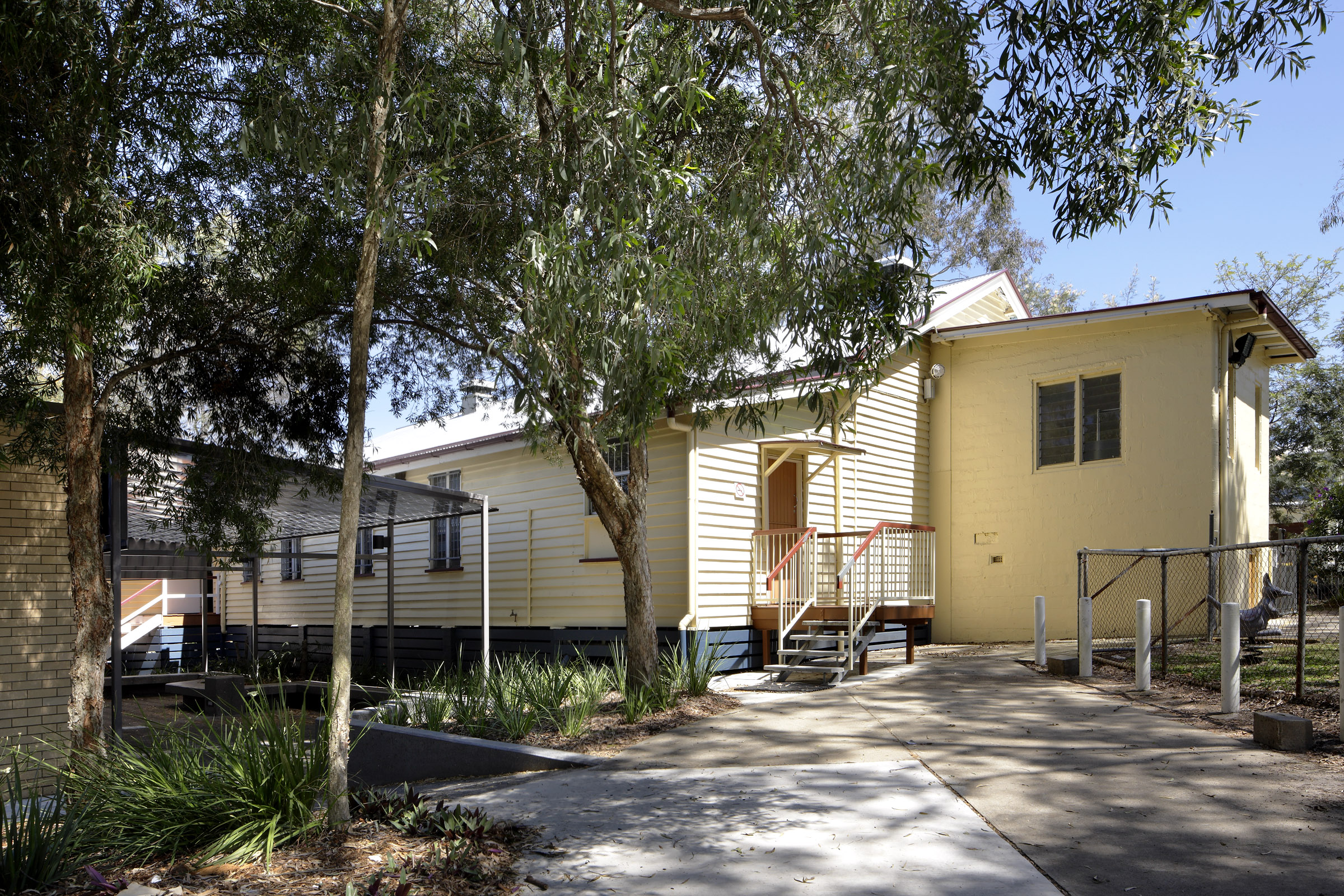
Sunnybank Hall, 2011

The Sunnybank Coopers Plains branch of the Queensland Country Women's Association meets at the St. Barnabas Anglican Church Hall at 189 Lister Street.

=== Medical ===
Near the main shopping precincts, the Sunnybank Private Hospital is a modern for-profit hospital, and accompanying annexes with specialist consultants.

=== Retail areas ===
Sunnybank includes shopping centres along Mains Road, such as Sunnybank Plaza. Market Square, located across from this centre, is a community-based centre that is Asian-focused, featuring numerous Asian shops and restaurants. Other shopping centres that are nearby to Sunnybank include Centro Pinelands, Oasis Shopping Village, Westfield Garden City, Sunnybank Hills Shoppingtown and Calamvale Central.

=== Places of worship ===
Sunnybank neighbourhood has many spiritual sites, including Anglican, Assemblies of God, Baptist, Catholic, Chinese Methodists, Christian and Missionary Alliance, Churches of Christ, Lutheran, Mormon/The Church of Jesus Christ of Latter-Day Saints, Presbyterian, Runcorn Christian, Southside International Church, The Great Commission and Uniting churches, Chung Tian Temple, Masjid Al Farooq (Kuraby Mosque), and The Brisbane Synagogue.

Sunnybank Church of Christ is at 105 Station Road (27.5756°S 153.0552°E).

Sunnybank Wesleyan Methodist Church meets at the Church of Christ. It is part of the Wesleyan Methodist Church of Australia.

=== Sport ===
Sunnybank is home of the Souths Sunnybank Rugby League Football Club, the second oldest rugby league club in Brisbane, and the Sunnybank Dragons Rugby Union Club.

== Transport ==
Sunnybank is a busy area, and there have been ever-growing traffic problems in the area. Mains Road can become gridlocked around peak-hour, packed with cars and buses, as commuters make the slow ride home, although construction has widened and improved the Mains Road bridge which crosses the train line at Altandi. Sunnybank plaza has a small bus stop, which serves as one of the major stops on most bus routes in the area.

Banoon railway station, Sunnybank railway station and Altandi railway station provides access to regular Queensland Rail City network services to Brisbane and Beenleigh.

== Climate ==
Climate data for Sunnybank
Month	Jan	Feb	Mar	Apr	May	Jun	Jul	Aug	Sep	Oct	Nov	Dec	Year
Average precipitation mm (inches)	119.3 (4.70)	108.5 (4.27)	111.4 (4.39)	66.3 (2.61)	53.2 (2.09)	43.6 (1.72)	31.2 (1.23)	31.6 (1.24)	34.3 (1.35)	63.9 (2.52)	76.7 (3.02)	106.4 (4.19)	1,073.8 (42.28)
Source: Bureau of Meteorology

Climate data for Archerfield Airport
Month	Jan	Feb	Mar	Apr	May	Jun	Jul	Aug	Sep	Oct	Nov	Dec	Year
Mean daily maximum °C (°F)	30.3 (86.5)	29.7 (85.5)	28.6 (83.5)	26.4 (79.5)	23.8 (74.8)	21.3 (70.3)	21.1 (70.0)	22.5 (72.5)	25.1 (77.2)	26.9 (80.4)	28.3 (82.9)	29.4 (84.9)	26.1 (79.0)
Mean daily minimum °C (°F)	20.2 (68.4)	18.7 (65.7)	18.3 (64.9)	15.1 (59.2)	11.8 (53.2)	9.2 (48.6)	7.5 (45.5)	8.0 (46.4)	11.0 (51.8)	14.3 (57.7)	17.1 (62.8)	19.0 (66.2)	14.3 (57.7)
Source 1: Bureau of Meteorology
Source 2: Bureau of Meteorology

== Notable residents ==
- Mark Coyne, Queensland Maroons, Australia, St George Dragons player.
- Ben Cutting, Australian cricketer, born in Sunnybank
- Luke Feldman, Australian cricketer, born in Sunnybank
- Ken Ham, President of Answers in Genesis
- Katrina Gorry, soccer player for Australia
- Samantha Reid, member of Australian Olympic team, synchronized swimmer.
- Johnathan Thurston, Queensland Maroons, Australia,Canterbury Bulldogs, and North Queensland Cowboys player.
- Lote Tuqiri, dual code rugby international
- Daniel Vidot, Samoan professional wrestler, and former rugby league player
