= Kuraby railway station =

Railway station in Brisbane, Australia

Kuraby
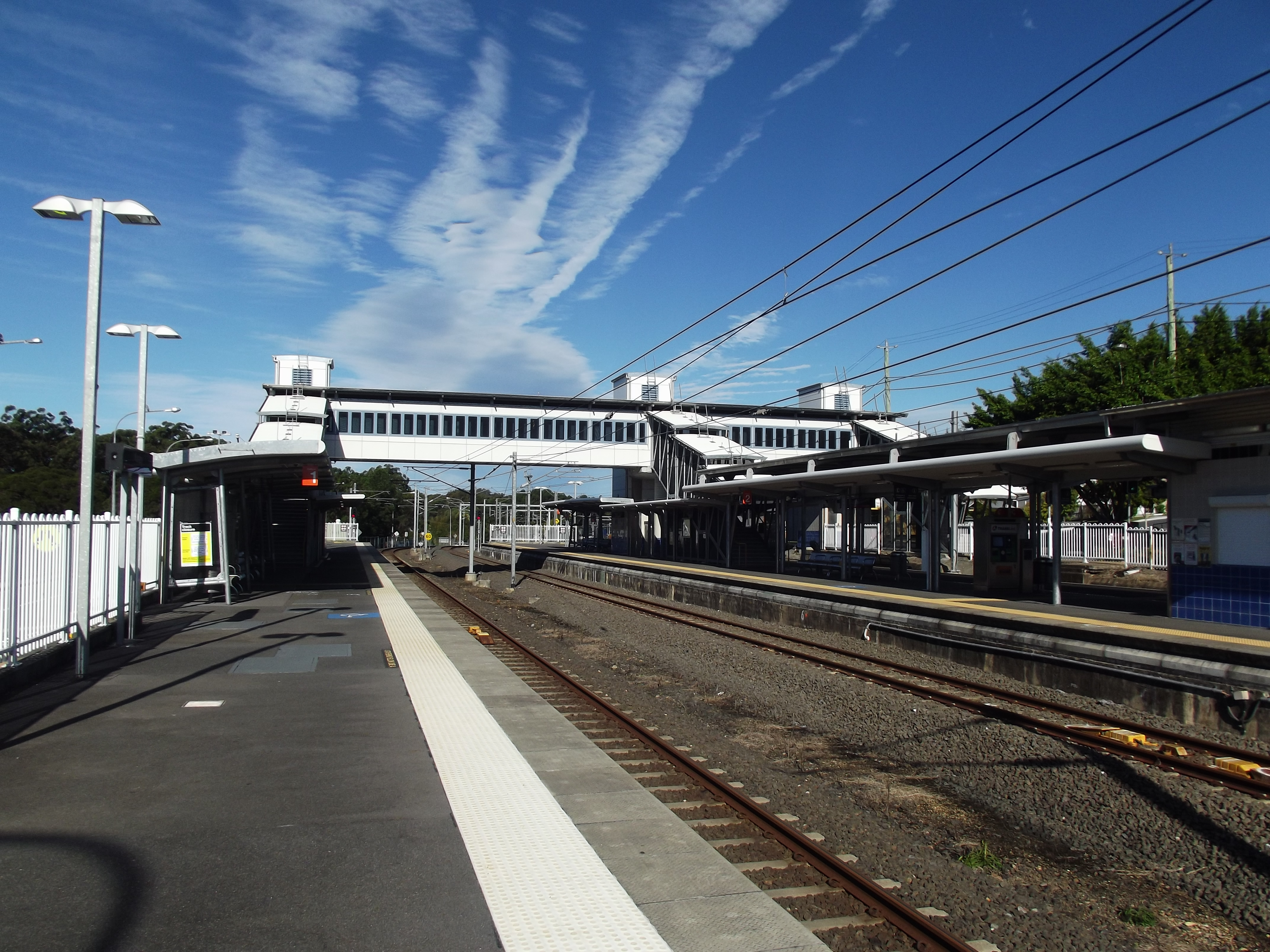
- Southbound view from Platform 1, July 2012

General information
- Location: Beenleigh Road, Kuraby
- Coordinates: 27°36′17″S 153°05′28″E
- Owner: Queensland Rail
- Operator: Queensland Rail
- Line: T6 Beenleigh
- Distance: 22.49 kilometres from Central
- Platforms: 3 (1 side, 1 island)
- Tracks: 3

Construction
- Structure type: Ground
- Parking: 161 bays
- Cycle facilities: Yes
- Accessible: Yes

Other information
- Status: Staffed
- Station code: 600221 (platform 1); 600222 (platform 2); 600223 (platform 3)
- Fare zone: Zone 2
- Website: Translink

History
- Opened: 1885; 141 years ago
- Rebuilt: 2008; 18 years ago
- Former names: Spring Creek

Services
Preceding station	Queensland Rail	Following station
Fruitgrove towards Ferny Grove	Beenleigh line	Trinder Park towards Beenleigh
Location

Kuraby is a railway station operated by Queensland Rail on the Beenleigh line. It opened in 1887 and serves the Brisbane suburb of Kuraby. It is a ground level station, featuring one island platform with two faces and one side platform.

== History ==
Kuraby station opened in 1885 as Spring Creek being renamed Kuraby in 1889. In 1998 work commenced on a third platform to allow Gold Coast line services to overtake Beenleigh line services. In 2008, an upgrade of the station was completed as part of the Salisbury to Kuraby triplication project. The upgrade included a new footbridge with lifts. As part of the Logan and Gold Coast Faster Rail project, the station will receive level crossing removals.

== Services ==
Kuraby station is served by all stops Beenleigh line services from Beenleigh to Bowen Hills and Ferny Grove. Two evening peak hours trains services from Brisbane terminate at Kuraby. While Kuraby has two services that begin in the morning peak hour and run into Bowen Hills.

== Platforms and services ==
Kuraby platform arrangement
Platform	Line	Destination	Notes
1	T6 Beenleigh	Beenleigh	
2	T6 Beenleigh	Beenleigh	Peak hours only
2	T6 Beenleigh	Roma Street (to Ferny Grove line)	Peak hours only
3	T6 Beenleigh	Roma Street (to Ferny Grove line)	
