= Beenleigh railway station =

Railway station in Queensland, Australia

Beenleigh
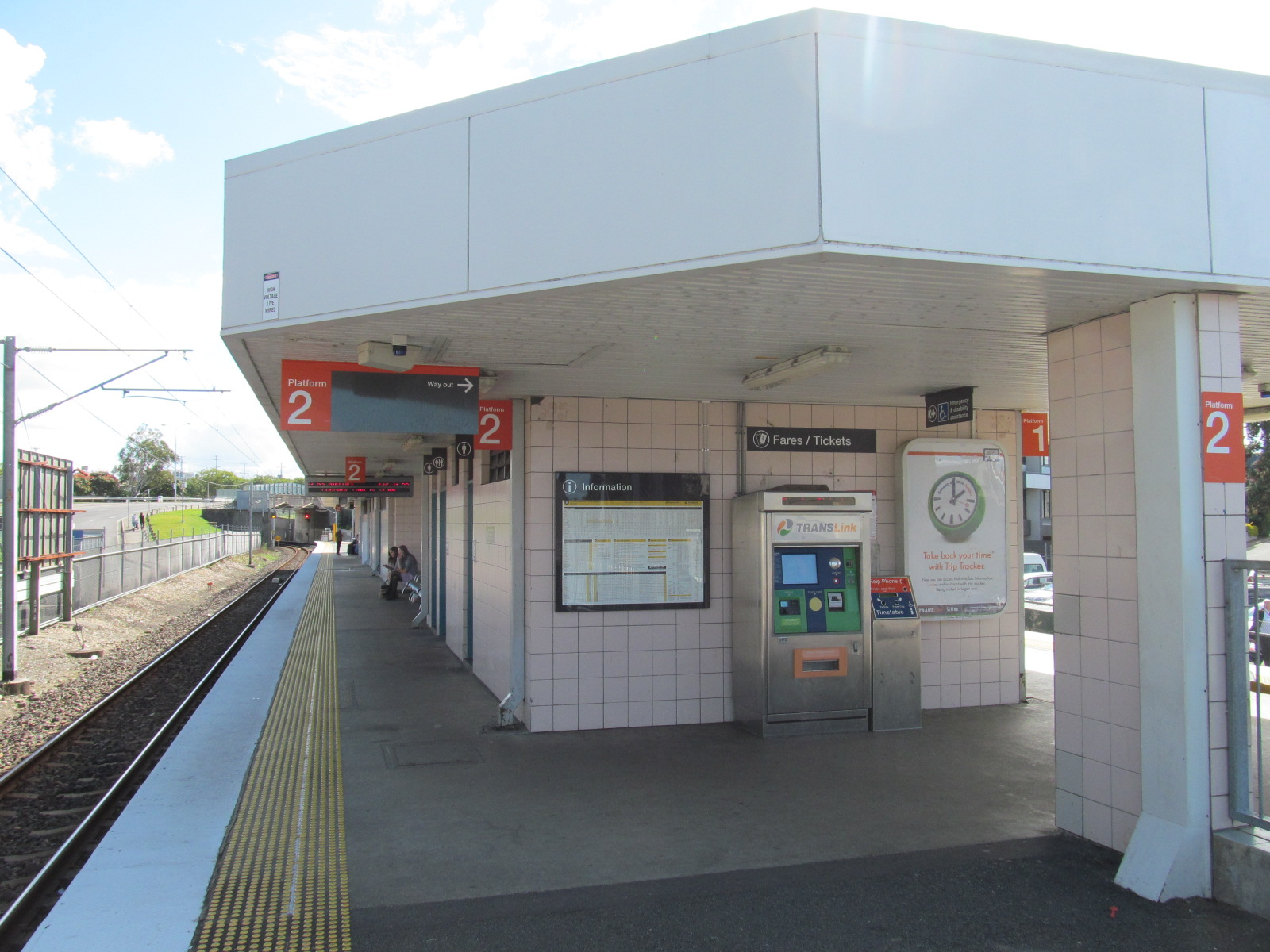
- Northbound view from Platform 2 in July 2013

General information
- Location: Alamein Street, Beenleigh
- Coordinates: 27°43′2.76″S 153°12′15.98″E
- Owner: Queensland Rail
- Operator: Queensland Rail
- Lines: T6 Beenleigh; T5 Varsity Lakes
- Distance: 40.05 kilometres from Central
- Platforms: 2 (1 island)
- Tracks: 2

Construction
- Structure type: Elevated
- Parking: 437 bays
- Cycle facilities: Yes
- Accessible: Yes

Other information
- Status: Staffed
- Station code: 600239 (platform 1); 600240 (platform 2)
- Fare zone: Zone 3
- Website: Queensland Rail

History
- Opened: 27 July 1885; 141 years ago
- Rebuilt: 12 March 1988; 38 years ago

Services
Preceding station	Queensland Rail	Following station
Holmview towards Ferny Grove	Beenleigh line	Terminus
Loganlea towards Domestic Airport	Varsity Lakes line	Ormeau towards Varsity Lakes
Location

Beenleigh is a railway station operated by Queensland Rail on the Beenleigh and Varsity Lakes lines. It opened in 1885 and serves the Logan suburb of Beenleigh. It is an elevated station, featuring one island platform with two faces.

== History ==
Beenleigh station opened in 1885 at its original location at the same time as the opening of the line. It served as the terminus of the line until the South Coast line opened to Southport on 25 January 1889. It became the terminus of the line again when the South Coast line closed on 30 June 1964.

The station was reopened at its current location on 12 March 1988 in time for World Expo 88. The original 1885 station building was relocated to the Beenleigh Historical Village. On 25 February 1996, the line was again extended south when the Gold Coast line opened to Helensvale.

During the 2013/14 financial year, the station was rated as the worst for fare evasion with 1,048 tickets dispensed. South of the station lies a Citytrain network stabling yard.

The station access is prone to flooding during severe weather events as its only commuter access is via an underpass.

Flooding warning signs are posted in the nearby parking areas. Queensland Rail’s Twitter post shows significant high flood levels from the March 2017 Floods.

In November 2023, it was announced that Beenleigh railway station will be relocated approximately 650m north of its current site to its original location between Soudan and Victoria Streets, near the Town Square and Magistrates Court. This change is occurring as part of the Logan and Gold Coast Faster Rail project. The new station will feature a number of upgrades, including accessibility improvements and increased proximity to the town centre and local amenities.

== Platforms and services ==
Beenleigh is the terminus for all stops Beenleigh line services. It is also served by limited stops Varsity Lakes line services.

Beenleigh platform arrangement
Platform	Line	Destination	Notes
1	T6 Beenleigh	Roma Street (to Ferny Grove line)	Morning peak only
1	T5 Varsity Lakes	Varsity Lakes	
2	T6 Beenleigh	Roma Street (to Ferny Grove line	
2	T5 Varsity Lakes	Roma Street (to Airport line)	

== Transport links ==
Logan City Bus Service operate seven bus services from stop A:

- 553: to Trinder Park, Woodridge
- 562: to Loganholme via Loganlea
- 563: Loganholme to Bethania
- 564: Loganholme bus loop; operates Sundays only
- 565: Windaroo to Loganholme
- 567: Beenleigh-Holmview bus loop
- 568: Loganholme bus loop; operates Sundays only

Kinetic Gold Coast operate two bus routes from stop B:

- 728: to Ormeau station via Jacobs Ridge
- 729: to Ormeau station via Norfolk Park

Translink, in partnership with the company TransitCare, operates the Mount Tamborine demand responsive transport (DRT) service between the Beenleigh transit centre and Mount Tamborine, North Tamborine and Eagle Heights. The service operates Monday to Friday, departing from Beenleigh station at 6:20pm and arriving at Tamborine Mountain at 7:30pm. Customers who wish to utilise this service are required to call TransitCare and make a booking. All bookings must be made at least one hour before departure.

Beenleigh station is a stop for certain long-distance coach services, and has a taxi rank, in addition to pick-up and drop-off areas for private cars. There are also two car parks on either side of the tracks, connected via an underpass.
