= Parkwood =

Parkwood or Park Wood may refer to:

== Places ==
=== Australia ===
- Parkwood, Western Australia, a suburb of Perth
- Parkwood, Queensland
- Parkwood, New South Wales, a proposed NSW/Australian Capital Territory suburb

=== Canada ===
- Parkwood, Ontario, a community in Valley East, Greater Sudbury

=== England ===
- Park Wood, Bedford, a local nature reserve
- Park Wood, Cambridgeshire, a Site of Special Scientific Interest
- Park Wood, Chilham, Kent, a Site of Special Scientific Interest
- Park Wood, Maidstone, Kent
- Park Wood, Medway, a suburban area of Rainham, Kent
- Park Wood and Goulding's Wood, a local nature reserve near Maidenhead, Berkshire
- Parkwood, Kent, a woodland wildlife and recreation area near Tenterden

=== Ireland ===
- Parkwood, County Offaly, a townland in Kilcumreragh civil parish, barony of Kilcoursey

=== South Africa ===
- Parkwood, Johannesburg

=== United States ===
- Parkwood, California, a census-designated place in Madera County
- Parkwood, Washington, a census-designated place in Kitsap County
- Parkwood (Decatur), a neighborhood in Decatur, Georgia
- Parkwood, Louisville, a neighborhood in Louisville, Kentucky
- Parkwood, Philadelphia, a neighborhood in Philadelphia, Pennsylvania
- Parkwood Formation, a geologic formation in Alabama

== Education ==
- Parkwood E-ACT Academy, Sheffield, England
- Parkwood Elementary School (disambiguation)
- Parkwood High School, Monroe, North Carolina, US
- Parkwood Secondary College, Ringwood North, Victoria, Australia
- Parkwood University, a University Degree Program diploma mill
- Park Wood, a student village and college at the University of Kent, UK

== Transport ==
- Parkwood light rail station, Parkwood, Queensland, Australia
- Parkwood station, Charlotte, North Carolina, US
- Chevrolet Parkwood, a station wagon manufactured from 1959 to 1961

== Other uses ==
- Parkwood Entertainment, a management and entertainment company founded by Beyoncé
- Parkwood Estate, a historic house in Oshawa, Ontario
- Parkwood Greyhound Stadium, a defunct greyhound racing and football stadium in Keighley, West Yorkshire, UK
- Parkwood Stable, a 1930s–1950 Thoroughbred racing stable near Oshawa, Ontario, Canada
- Parkwood (bandy club), a United States bandy champion

== See also ==
- Parkwoods, a neighbourhood in Toronto, Ontario, Canada
