= Molendinar railway station =

Railway station in Queensland, Australia

Molendinar
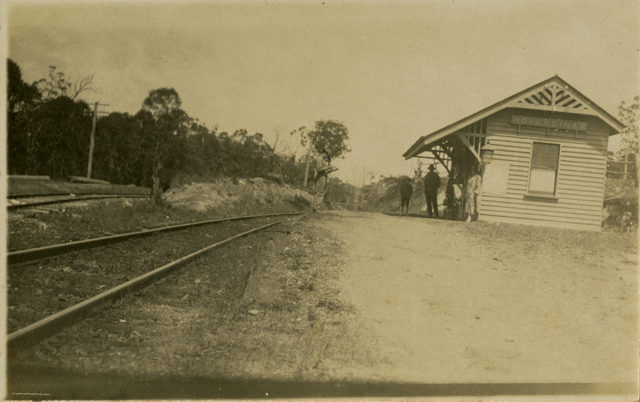

General information
- Location: Molendinar, Queensland; Australia

Services
Preceding station	Queensland Rail	Following station
Former service
Ernest Junction towards South Brisbane	South Coast line	Nerang towards Tweed Heads

Molendinar railway station was a railway station in Molendinar, Queensland, Australia. The station was known as Benowa until being renamed in October 1889. The station building was damaged by fire in July 1927.
