= South Coast railway line, Queensland =

Former railway line in Queensland, Australia

South Coast line
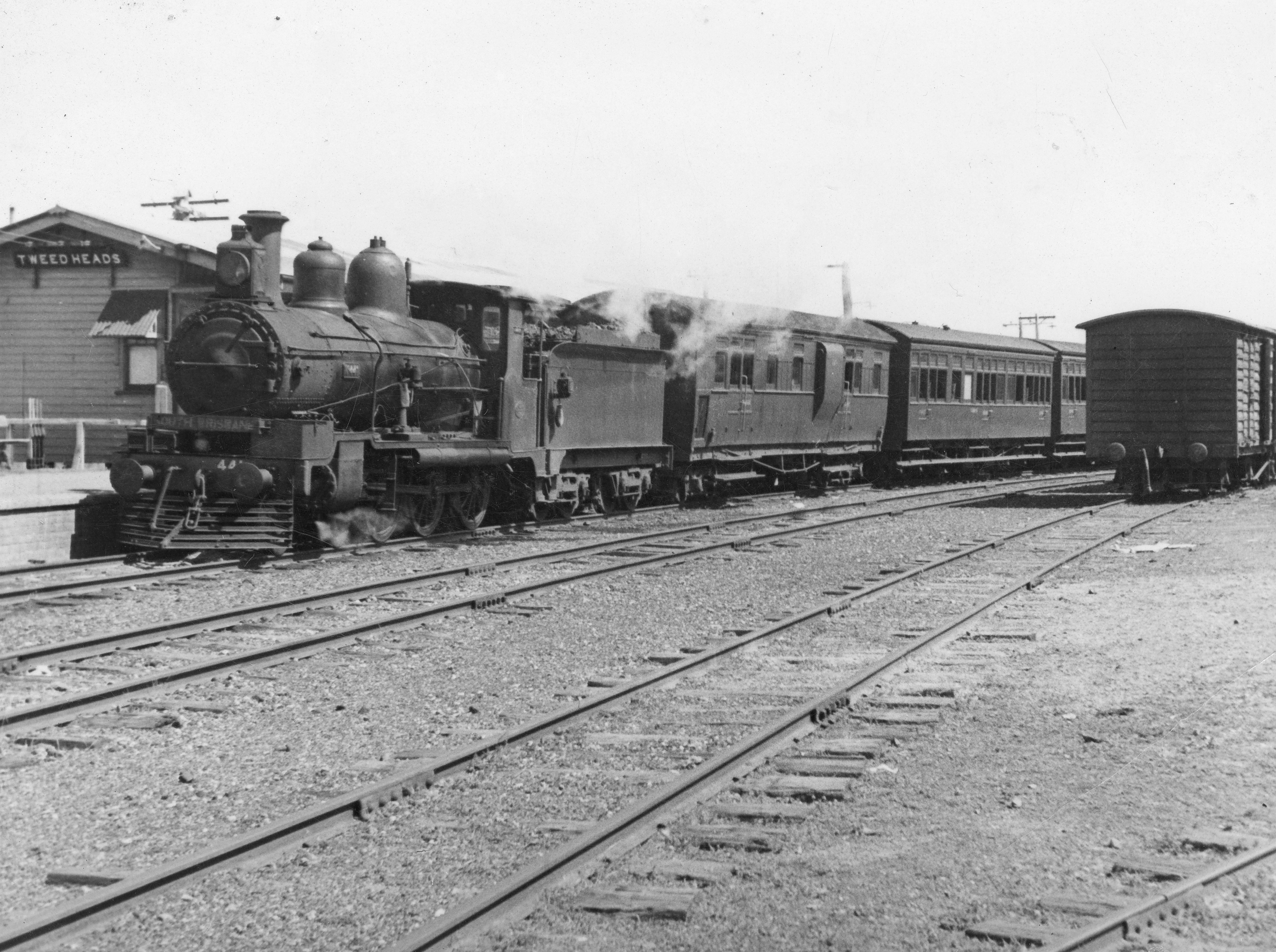
- Train at Tweed Heads in 1940

Overview
- Owner: Queensland Railways

Service
- Operator: Queensland Railways

History
- Opened: 25 January 1889 (to Southport); 10 August 1903 (to Tweed Heads)
- Closed: 1 July 1961 (to Tweed Heads); 30 June 1964 (to Southport)

Technical
- Line length: 73 kilometres
- Track gauge: 3 ft 6 in (1,067 mm)

The South Coast line was an interurban commuter railway line in South East Queensland. Operated by Queensland Railways, the line opened in 1889 and was later extended to the border with New South Wales. At its peak, the line ran for 111.7 kilometres (69 miles) from South Brisbane to Tweed Heads, serving the South Coast (now known as the Gold Coast). The Tweed Heads branch closed in 1961 and the line from Beenleigh to Southport closed in 1964.

In 1996, the Gold Coast line opened, running on a modified alignment in the north and a new route in the south. Since 2009, it has terminated at Varsity Lakes. There have been proposals to extend the present-day line to the Gold Coast Airport, which would result in three new stations in suburbs that were previously served by the South Coast line.

== History ==
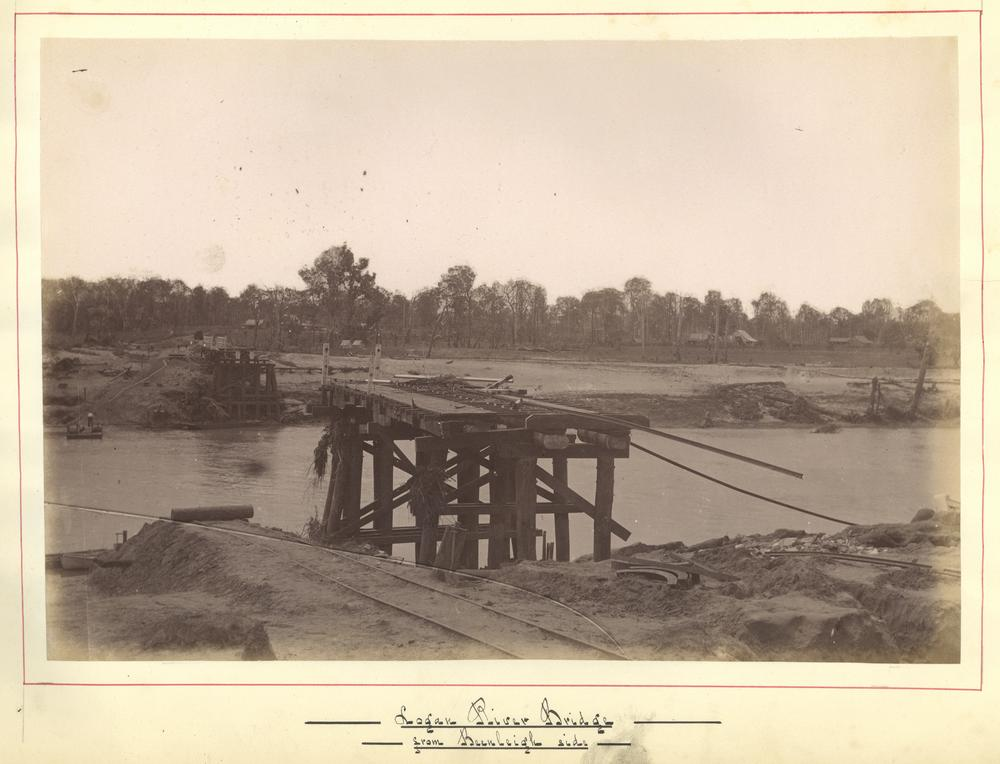
Flood damaged Logan River crossing, 1887

The Beenleigh railway line opened in 1885 before being extended 26 miles (42 km) from Beenleigh railway station to Southport in 1889. The firm of J. W. Sutton and Company of Kangaroo Point in Brisbane provided materials and aided in bridge construction for the railway line.

A branch line running 22 miles (35 km) from Southport Junction (later renamed Ernest Junction) to Tweed Heads opened on 10 August 1903.

It had been hoped that the New South Wales Government would extend its Casino to Murwillumbah line a further 30 kilometres from Murwillumbah to Tweed Heads, but this did not occur due to cost of resuming the land and the expenses associated with the tunnel and bridge that would be required.

Due to the increasing popularity of the motor car, and political interests in road transport, the Tweed Heads branch closed on 1 July 1961, followed by the Beenleigh to Southport line on 30 June 1964, despite fierce local outcry in the case of the line to Southport.

== Stations ==
The initial South Coast line officially opened on 24 January 1889. It included a number of cuts, river crossings, long grades and a tunnel at Ernest Junction that remains in situ (and is now heritage-listed). The second branch of the South Coast line, known as the Nerang-Tweed Heads extension, opened 14 September 1903 and stretched from Ernest Junction to the Queensland-New South Wales border.

Station	Image	Suburbs	Opened	Closed	Coordinates	Notes
Yatala		Yatala	24 January 1889	1891		Closed in 1891.
Stapylton		Stapylton	24 January 1889	30 June 1964	27.739149°S 153.230014°E	
Ormeau		Ormeau	24 January 1889	30 June 1964	27.792725°S 153.265299°E	
Pimpama	Former rail station	Pimpama	24 January 1889	30 June 1964	27.8152°S 153.2921°E	
Coomera	Former rail station	Coomera	24 January 1889	30 June 1964	27.872830°S 153.312883°E	
Oxenford	Former rail station	Oxenford	24 January 1889	30 June 1964	27.8855°S 153.3154°E	Originally known as 39 Mile Platform.
Helensvale		Helensvale	24 January 1889	30 June 1964	27.898255°S 153.328348°E	
Coombabah		Coombabah	24 January 1889	1891	27.950143°S 153.346100°E	Closed in 1891.
Ernest Junction	Former rail station	Molendinar	24 January 1889	30 June 1964	27.970056°S 153.358775°E	
Unnamed		Southport	24 January 1889		27.966329°S 153.386194°E	
Unnamed		Southport	24 January 1889		27.967255°S 153.399823°E	
Southport	Former rail station	Southport	24 January 1889	30 June 1964	27.9637°S 153.4110°E	
Molendinar	Former rail station	Molendinar	24 January 1889	1 July 1961	27.9855°S 153.3560°E	Renamed from Benowa in October 1889.
Nerang	Former rail station	Nerang	14 September 1903	1 July 1961	27.9953°S 153.3401°E	
Worongary	Former rail station	Worongary	14 September 1903	1 July 1961		
Mudgeeraba	Former rail station	Mudgeeraba	14 September 1903	1 July 1961		
Reedy Creek		Reedy Creek	14 September 1903	1 July 1961		
West Burleigh	Former rail station	Burleigh Heads	14 September 1903	1 July 1961	28.1147°S 153.4416°E	On the western bank of Tallebudgera Creek roughly where the Pacific Highway crosses the creek today. Renamed from Booningba in 1914.
Elanora	Former rail station	Elanora	14 September 1903	1 July 1961	28.1245°S 153.4644°E	At the intersection of Palm Beach Avenue and the Pacific Highway
Currumbin	Former rail station	Currumbin	14 September 1903	1 July 1961	28.1378°S 153.4731°E	On the eastern bank of Currumbin Creek. The current pedestrian bridge is the former railway bridge.
Tugun	Former rail station	Tugun	14 September 1903	1 July 1961	28.1435°S 153.49434°E	Roughly on the intersection of the Gold Coast Highway and Toolana Street.
Bilinga	Former rail station	Bilinga	14 September 1903	1 July 1961	28.1601°S 153.5110°E	Roughly on the intersection of the Gold Coast Highway and George Street.
Kirra		Kirra	14 September 1903	1 July 1961	28.1698°S 153.5262°E	Roughly at the intersection of Coolangatta Road and Haig Street.
Coolangatta	Former rail station	Coolangatta	14 September 1903	1 July 1961	28.1685°S 153.5367°E	Griffith Street.
Tweed Heads	Former rail station	Tweed Heads	14 September 1903	1 July 1961	28.1720°S 153.5405°E	

== Route ==
From Beenleigh, coast-bound trains crossed the Old Pacific Highway three times between there and Yatala. In between these was the impressive Albert River crossing, made of three steel lattice girder spans. After passing Stapylton, the alignment was straight and of good standard, before reaching Ormeau. The alignment began to curve here, eventually reaching the Pimpama River and Pimpama Station. Coomera station was next, and a short distance later, the line crossed the Coomera River on a large bridge, similar to the Albert River bridge but with four spans instead of three. The southern floodplain of the river was crossed on timber trestles, leading to Oxenford. Passing Saltwater Creek, the line went through Helensvale, which had a small halt with little else but a nameboard signalling the station. After climbing nearly two miles, the railway passed through the curved Ernest Junction Tunnel. The station was just past here. The Southport branch continued on to Southport, but the Tweed Heads line continued onwards. Passing the small station of Molendinar, the line passed under the Southport-Nerang Road. The Nerang River bridge was next. Then came Nerang and Mudgeeraba stations, today covered by the busy Pacific Motorway. A tunnel was reached at West Burleigh, before arriving at the station of that name. After crossing Tallebudgera Creek bridge (now also demolished and replaced by the Pacific Motorway) travellers reached Elanora, then came the still extant Currumbin Creek bridge. From here, the route followed today's Stewart Street between Currumbin and Tugun, the Gold Coast Highway between Tugun and Kirra, Coolangatta Road between Kirra and Coolangatta, and Griffith Street over the border to Tweed Heads.

== Services ==
Passenger trains ran from South Brisbane to Southport with connecting trains from Ernest Junction or Southport to Tweed Heads. Picnic and excursion trains ran through from South Brisbane to Tweed Heads on Sundays.

From opening until around 1910, A12 and B13 class locos were the main motive power. From there until the 1950s, services were operated exclusively by PB15 class locomotives, the largest locomotive permitted to cross the Logan River. Diesel rail cars of the 1800 and 2000 classes operated some passenger services from the 1950s until closure in the 1960s.

== Remains ==
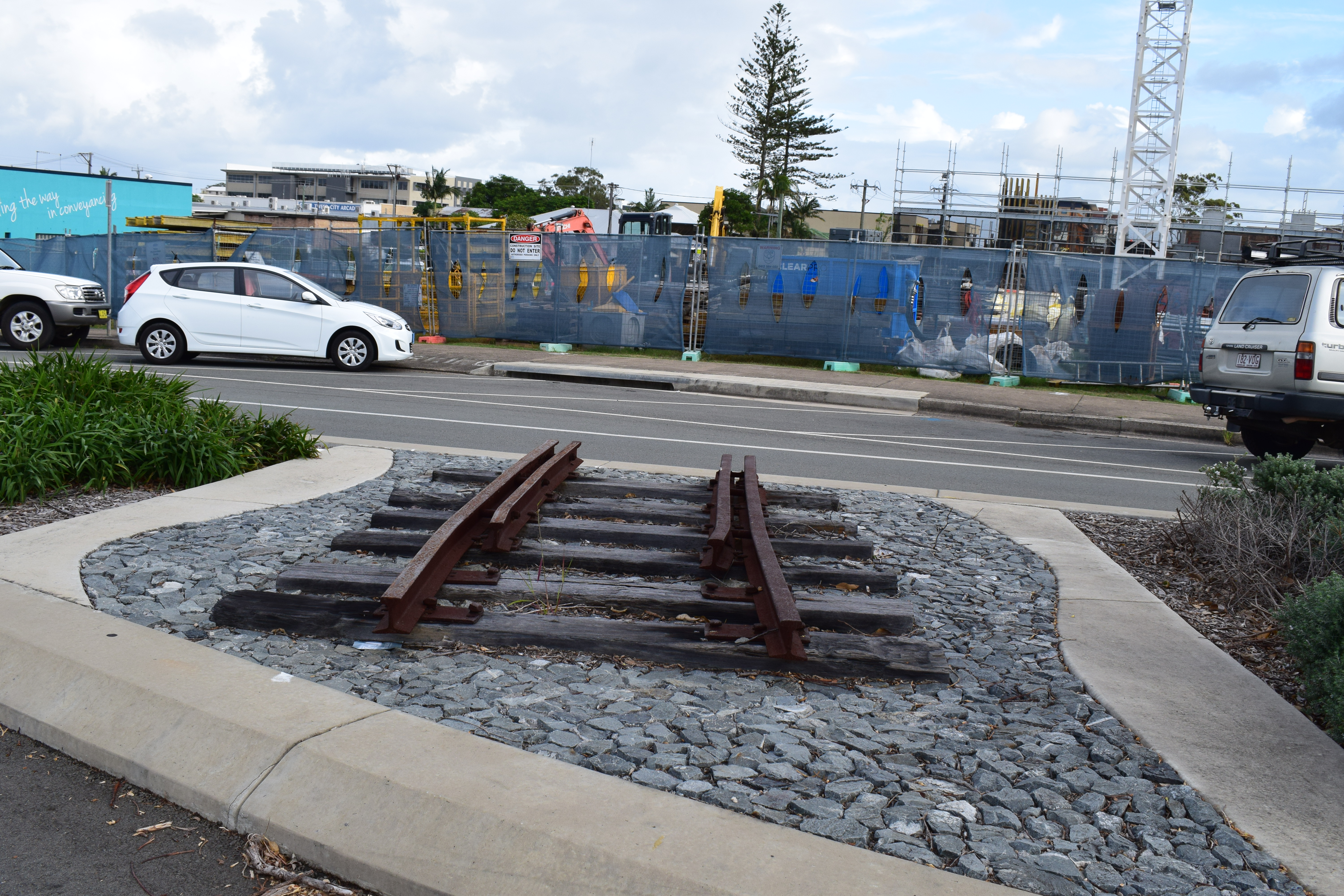
A preserved piece of railway, where the route crossed Bay Street at Tweed Heads

- The Beenleigh railway line is still in use.
- The Gold Coast railway line follows most of the original alignment as far as Coomera.
- The track bed between Ernest Junction and Southport, and between Tugun and Coolangatta, is still visible.
- The original Nerang station still exists at the Gold Coast Hinterland Heritage Museum at Mudgeeraba.
- The railway bridge over Currumbin Creek was converted to a footbridge. This footbridge was rebuilt in 2016 to renew and widen the deck. Post-rebuild, the pylons are the only part of the original bridge.
- Prior to 1995 the Tallebudgera bridge carried water pipes across the creek. That bridge has since been demolished to make way for widening of the Pacific Motorway.
- Short sections of the route at Currumbin, Coolangatta and Southport have been reused as a pedestrian/bicycle paths.
- The Southport tunnel still exists, but the West Burleigh tunnel doesn't, it was demolished to make way for the Pacific Motorway.
- The Coolangatta station area is now located between Chalk St and Griffith Street.
- The site of Southport railway station is now a local club.

== See also ==
- Construction of Queensland railways
- Rail transport in South East Queensland

== Bibliography ==
- Alan Arundell (2011). The South Coast Railway: A history of Growth and Transport on the Gold Coast. Water Street Productions. ISBN 978-0646555287.
- Kerr, John; Armstrong, John (1978). Destination Sth Brisbane: an illustrated history of the southside railways of Brisbane. Australian Railway Historical Society.
