= Oxenford railway station =

Railway station in Queensland, Australia

Oxenford
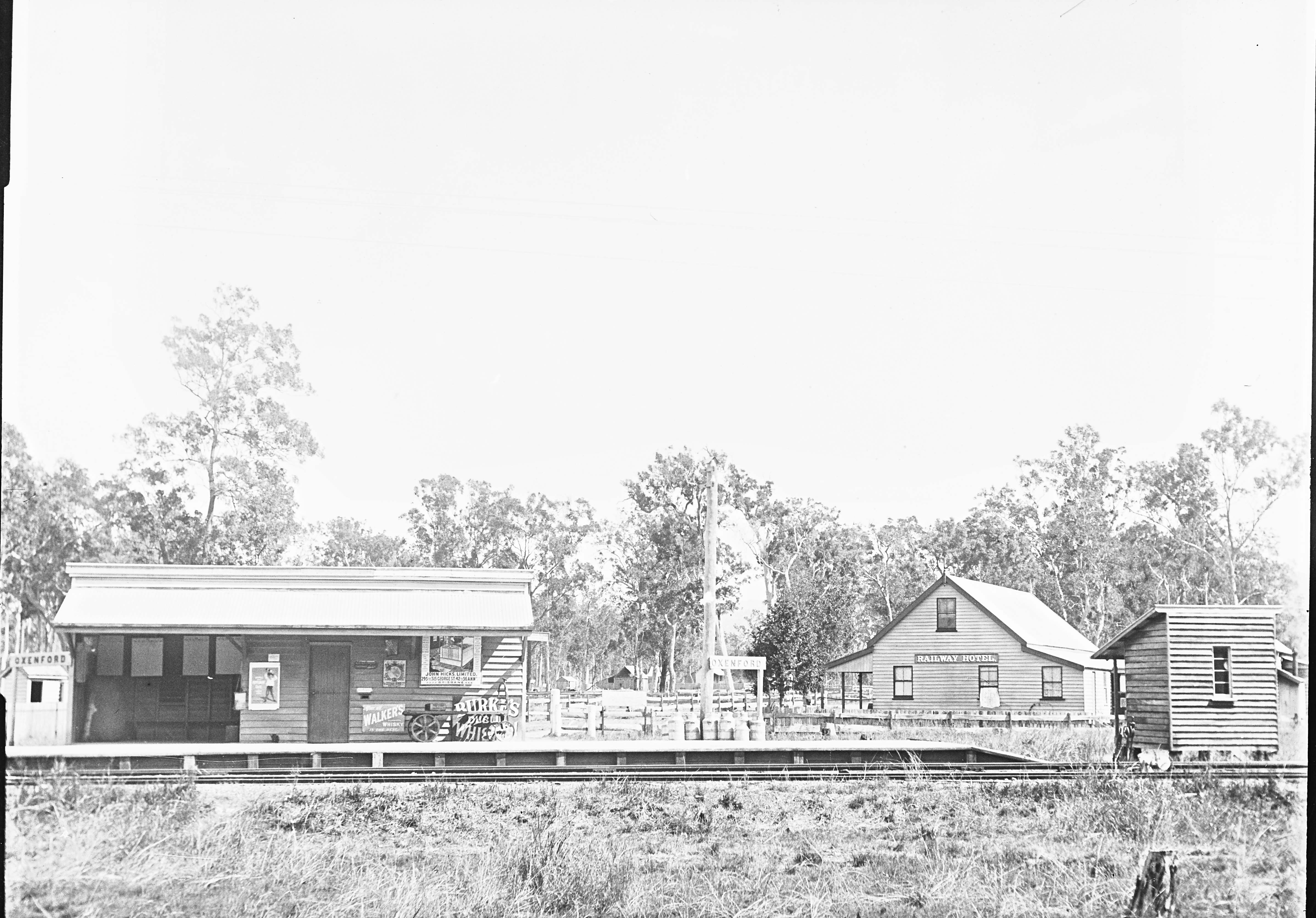
- Oxenford Railway Station and Oxenford Railway Hotel

General information
- Location: Oxenford, Queensland; Australia

Services
Preceding station	Queensland Rail	Following station
Former service
South Brisbane Terminus	South Coast line	Tweed Heads Terminus

Oxenford railway station was a railway station in Oxenford, Queensland, Australia.

== History ==
In January 1904, a horse broke free near the station and was killed after being carried by the engine over the railway bridge.

After a request for a weigh bridge by the Coomera Progress Association in 1907, one was promised by the Commissioner for Railways in 1922.

The Goods shed was damaged by fire in August 1922.

The safe was stolen in August 1937, before being found submerged in a creek at Kingston. A 25 year old labourer was charged and later sentenced to three years imprisonment with hard labour.
