= Brisbane railway station =

Brisbane railway station may refer to these railway stations in Brisbane, Australia:

- Central railway station, Brisbane, main suburban station
- Roma Street railway station, main station for long distance services
- South Brisbane railway station, former interstate terminal until 1986
