= Tugun railway station =

Former railway station in Tugun, Australia

Tugun
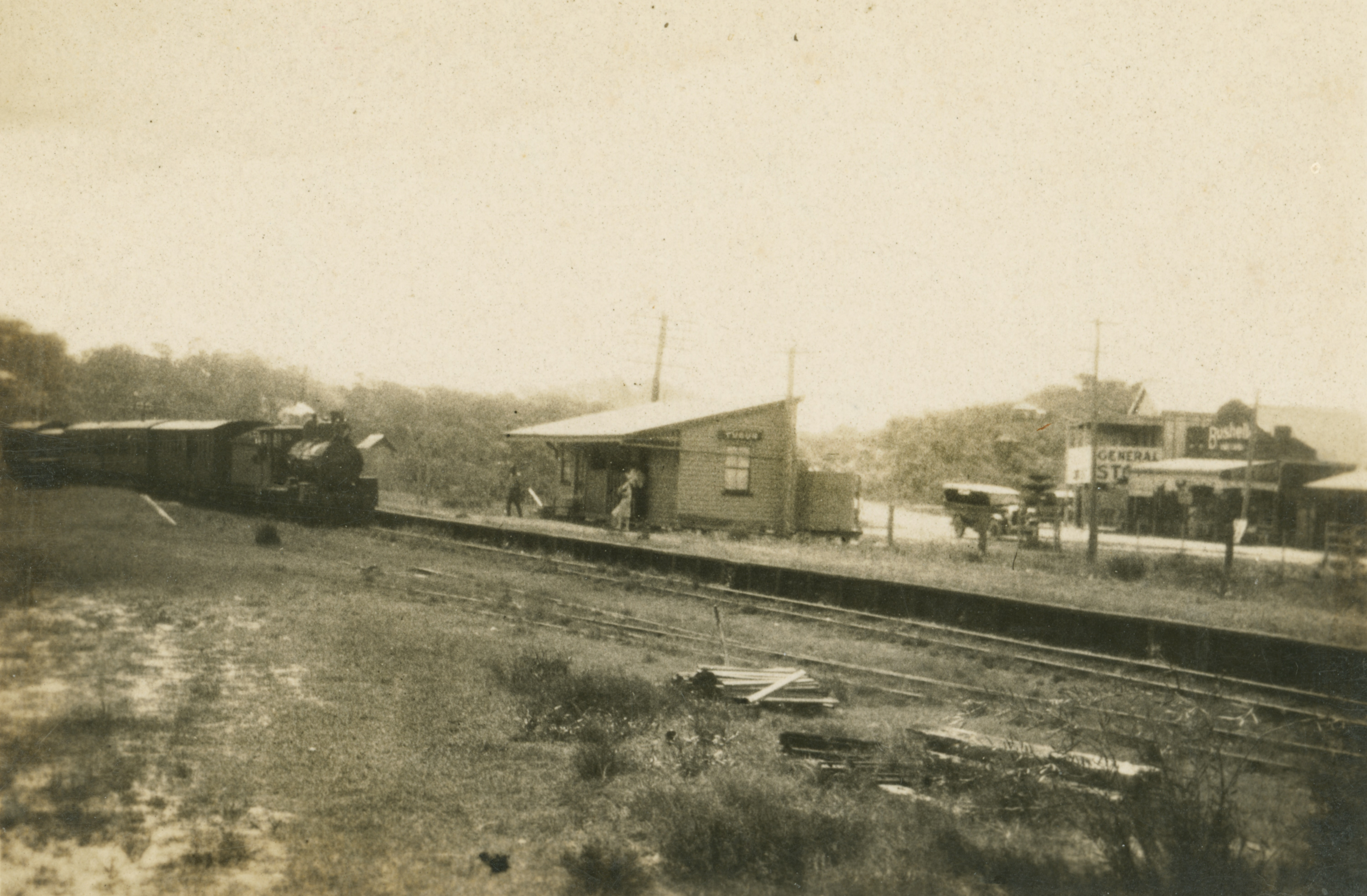
- 1931

General information
- Location: Tugun, Queensland; Australia
- Operator: Queensland Railways
- Distance: 65 miles 46 chains (105.5 km) from South Brisbane

Services
Preceding station	Queensland Rail	Following station
Former service
Currumbin towards South Brisbane	South Coast line	Bilinga towards Tweed Heads

Tugun railway station was a railway station in Tugun, Queensland, Australia.

== History ==
The station name Tugan, meaning "sea waves" was approved in October 1910. A request for a good siding was made in July 1912. Further requests for a platform and station supervision in February 1922. By July 1924, platform had been raised and station master dwelling and office erected.

At 1am on 18 December 1930, a guard was killed and heavily mutilated while being dragged 20 yards (18 m) after falling under a wagon during shunting operations at the station.

The station was broken into in September 1955.

In December 1947, a passenger was injured after being dragged while attempting to alight from a train.
