= Brickhill =

Civil parish in Bedfordshire, England

Coordinates: 52.15725°N 0.46078°W

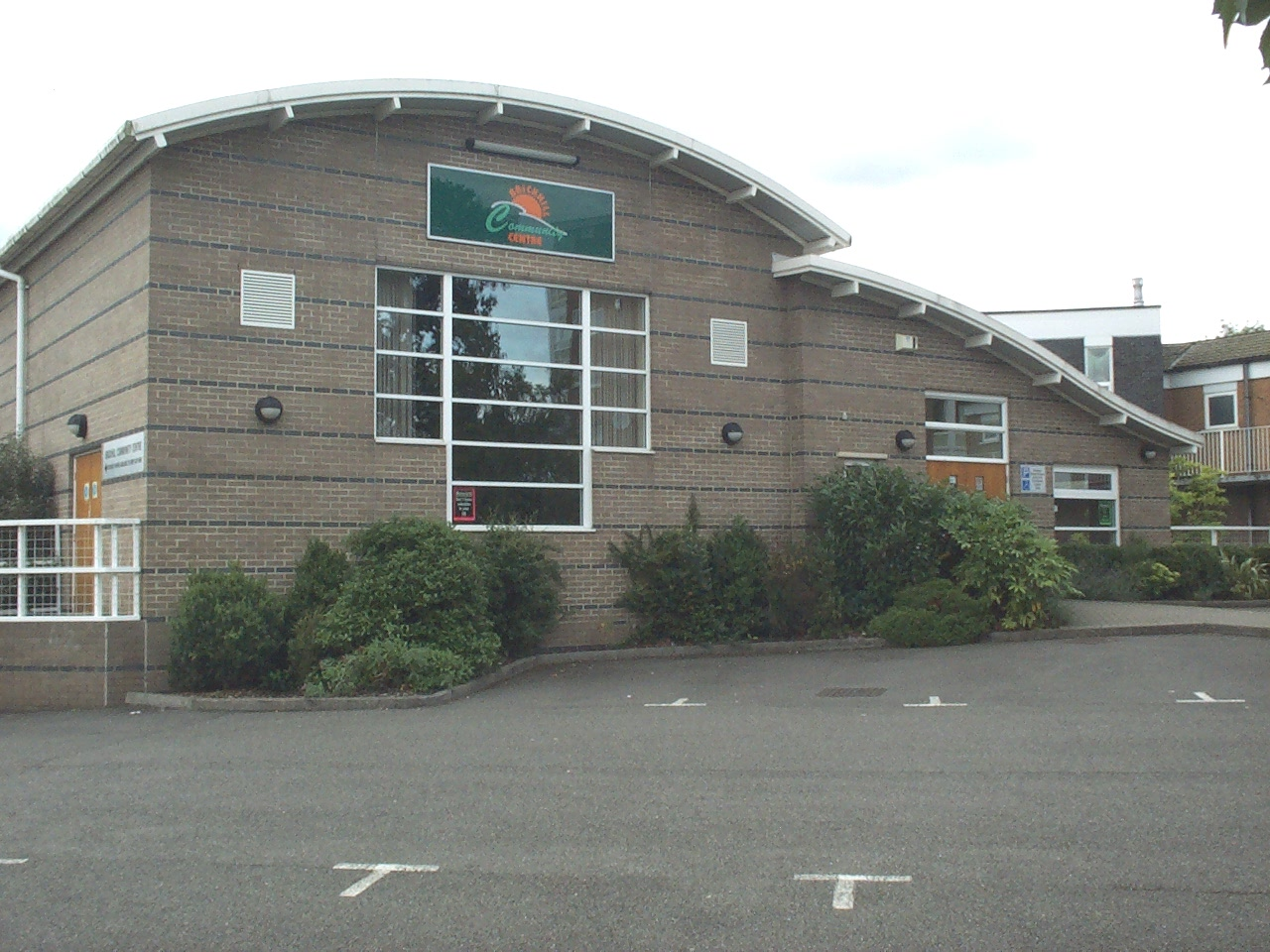
- Brickhill Community Centre

- Location within Bedfordshire
- Population: 8,678; 8,153 {2011 Census. Ward & Parish}
- OS grid reference: TL053521
- Unitary authority: Bedford
- Ceremonial county: Bedfordshire
- Region: East
- Country: England
- Sovereign state: United Kingdom
- Post town: BEDFORD
- Postcode district: MK41
- Dialling code: 01234
- Police: Bedfordshire
- Fire: Bedfordshire
- Ambulance: East of England
- UK Parliament: Bedford

Brickhill is a civil parish and electoral ward within northern Bedford in Bedfordshire, England.

The boundaries of Brickhill are approximately Kimbolton Road to the east, Bedford Park and the old Bedford cemetery to the south, with Cemetery Hill and the Manton Heights Industrial Estate to the west. The Woodlands Park housing estate (off Tyne Crescent) became part of Brickhill parish in 2015.

== History ==
The name 'Brickhill' derives from 'Brickhill Farm' which occupied the land before the area was developed. 'Brickhill' may have been a reference to brick-making in the area, as the neighbourhood has a high clay content in its soils. Brick-making used to be a major industry in Bedfordshire (See Stewartby). The name may also derive from a compound of Brythonic and Anglo Saxon origins, which is a common occurrence in this part of the country. The Brythonic breg means 'hill', and the Anglo Saxon hyll also means 'hill'.

Brickhill Farm was the location of Brickhill House, a 17th-century makeover of a much older manor house. The residence was the seat of the Foster family, and it was in its heyday in the 1820s, when the famous American author, Washington Irving, came to pay court to the daughter of the house, Emily Foster (she turned him down). The house was eventually destroyed by fire in 1946.

Following World War II momentum grew in Bedford to plan the re-development of the town from its population of 58,000 to 75,000. This required the provision of a substantial area of land for housing development. At the time, Bedfordshire County Council (who were the planning authority) attempted to pursue Bedford Borough Council to consider development on areas of clay sub-soil around northern Bedford, and in particular across Brickhill. There initially appeared to be great resistance to this. Traditionally buildings in Bedford had been founded on areas of River Terrace gravels, and it was thought in 1949 that the cost of the foundations excavated into the Boulder Clay/Blue Oxford Clay would add approximately £70 to the cost of constructing a house. Since no viable alternative could be found by the Borough they eventually accepted the county's proposals for development of the Brickhill area.

Houses in South Brickhill were constructed from 1959. This neighbourhood became the Birds area, with all the streets named after birds (e.g. Linnet Way, Hawk Drive, Dove Road). North Brickhill was developed from 1966, and became the Rivers area, with all the streets named after rivers (e.g. Avon Drive, Waveney Avenue, Tyne Crescent).

'Pilgrim Selective Secondary School' was established on Brickhill Drive in 1962. Originally a grammar school, it became a comprehensive upper school in the early 1970s and was renamed 'Pilgrims Upper School'. The school was merged with John Howard Upper School in 1986 to form Biddenham Upper School, with the Pilgrim site closing in 1988. The old school site has since been converted to a business park called 'The Pilgrim Centre'.

Previously an unparished area, Brickhill was served by an urban community council from 1993, but since 1 April 2004 it has been a civil parish, with its own parish council. Brickhill is currently the only area of Bedford town that has its own parish council.

The Charles Wells pub called the Bird in Hand which was located on Brickhill Drive closed in 2011. Charles Wells sold the pub building to Tesco who redeveloped it into a Tesco Express store. The opening of the store attracted considerable opposition from local residents and business owners.

Woodlands Park is a housing estate that was constructed from the late 2000s, and located directly to the north of Brickhill. Initially the estate was not formally part of the Brickhill parish, but was instead part of the nearby village of Ravensden. Woodlands Park formally became part of Brickhill parish in 2015, but remains part of Great Barford ward (which includes Ravensden) for elections to Bedford Borough Council.

== Governance ==
Brickhill Parish Council is made up of 15 elected councillors with cross party representation. Brickhill also elect two borough councillors to Bedford Borough Council and another two specifically for Woodlands Park which, pending a boundary review, currently comes under Great Barford ward.

== Economy ==
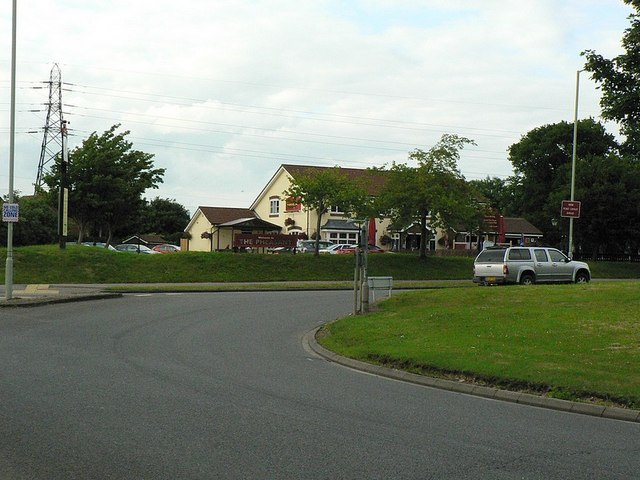
The Pheasant pub in Brickhill

There are two parades of shops in the area at which most local businesses are located. The first is found on Brickhill Drive which has a newsagent, a cafe, a small Nisa supermarket, a Lloyds Pharmacy, a beauty salon, a garage & car wash, a betting shop and a barber's shop.

The second shopping precinct is located on Avon Drive and consists of a small One Stop supermarket, a newsagent & post office, a fish & chip shop, a florists, a Coral betting shop, a garage, a pub called The Tiger Moth, and an Elderly Persons Home called 'Highfield'.

Further along Brickhill Drive is The Pilgrim Centre. This small business park houses a number of offices and businesses, including the administrative headquarters of the Harpur Trust.

There are a few other smaller businesses and facilities located in Brickhill, most notably a veterinary clinic, located on Linnet Way and the Charles Wells pub called The Pheasant, located on Avon Drive.

The Woodlands Park housing estate is currently an entirely residential development, though plans for a shop were included in the planning brief for the area. The older persons residential schemes 'Anjulita Court' and 'Ladyslaude Court' are located on Bramley Way in the area.

== Education ==
Brickhill's School Catchment Area includes three state schools - Brickhill Primary School which is on Dove Road, and Scott Primary School which is located on Hawk Drive. St Thomas More Catholic School is a Roman Catholic secondary school located on Tyne Crescent. For secondary school education, most of Brickhill is in the catchment of Biddenham International School, the remainder is in the catchment of Mark Rutherford School. St Thomas More School does not have a catchment area as it is a Roman Catholic school.

Pilgrims Pre-Preparatory School is an independent school located on Brickhill Drive. This school belongs to the Harpur Trust.

== Religious sites ==
- All Nations Church (formerly Brickhill Baptist Church) is located on Brickhill Drive
- St Phillip & St James Roman Catholic Church, located on Severn Way
- St Mark's Church of England and Methodist Church, located on Calder Rise, just off Avon Drive
- Noah's Ark Church hold Sunday services at Brickhill Community Centre

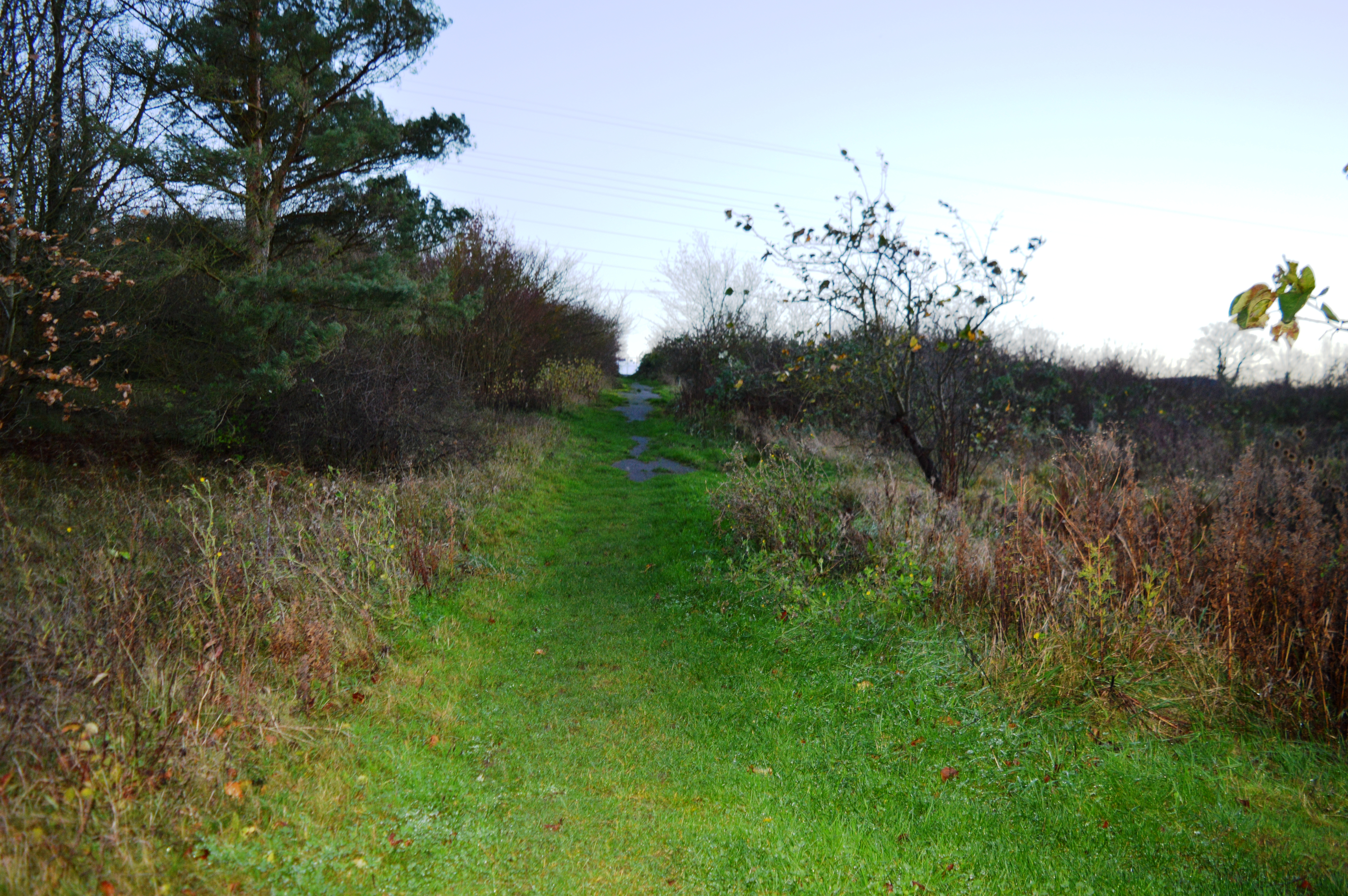
Park Wood nature reserve

== Community facilities ==
Brickhill's community centre is located at the Avon Drive shopping parade, as well as a recycling point. There is another recycling point on Brickhill Drive. There are a number of post boxes and telephone boxes throughout the area and a main bus route into Bedford town centre runs through Brickhill.

Brickhill has a comparatively high number of open spaces and children's play-parks, including Waveney Green (situated between Waveney Avenue, Linnet Way and Avon Drive). There is also a large area of allotments as well as Park Wood local nature reserve located off Brickhill Drive. In the Woodlands Park area there is also playing fields and sports changing facilities.
