= Ernest Junction railway tunnel =

Ernest Junction Railway Tunnel
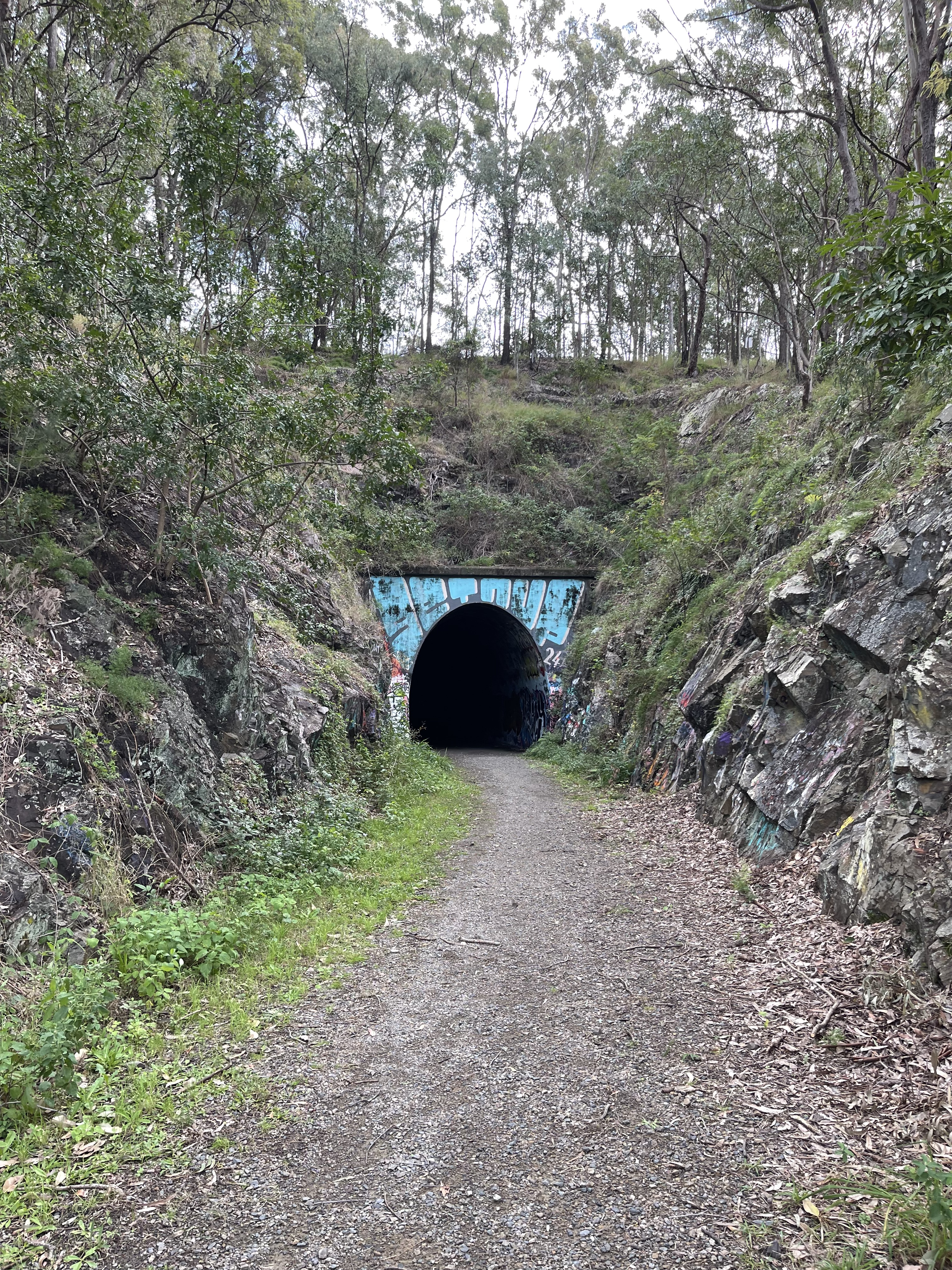
- Eastern portal, 2026

- Location within Queensland
- 27.9654°S 153.3558°E
- Location: 797 Ashmore Road, Molendinar, Gold Coast City, Queensland, Australia

History
- Design period: 1870s-1890s Late 19th century
- Built: 1885–1889,1885–1889

Queensland Heritage Register
- Official name: Ernest Junction Railway Tunnel; Ernest Junction Tunnel
- Type: state heritage
- Designated: 3 May 2019
- Reference no.: 650228
- Type: Transport-rail: Railway embankment/formation/cutting; Transport-rail: Rail tunnel
- Theme: Developing secondary and tertiary industries: Feeding Queenslanders; Developing secondary and tertiary industries: Catering for tourists; Moving goods, people and information: Using rail
- Builders: Queensland Railway Department (1887-1932), Railways Department

Ernest Junction railway tunnel is a heritage-listed former railway tunnel at 797 Ashmore Road, Molendinar, Gold Coast City, Queensland, Australia. It was built from 1885 to 1889 by the Queensland Railway Department. It was added to the Queensland Heritage Register on 3 May 2019.

== History ==
The Ernest Junction railway tunnel, in the Gold Coast suburb of Molendinar, situated approximately 6 kilometres (3.7 mi) west of Southport, was constructed in 1889. Built as part of the South Coast railway line which ultimately connected Brisbane to Tweed Heads, it is one of the last remnants of this important railway infrastructure on the South Coast (now known as the Gold Coast), and the only extant tunnel from a decommissioned line which was essential to the South Coast's agricultural and tourism industries. The line was closed in 1964 and the rail tracks were removed from the tunnel.

The Gold Coast district forms part of the traditional land of the Yugambeh people. European settlement began in the South Coast in 1840s with a fledgling timber industry, which utilised large rivers such as the Nerang River and the Tweed River to carry logs downstream to the coast to be shipped to Brisbane or Sydney. By the 1870s sugarcane had become the predominant crop, as selectors established farms throughout the Nerang district. A small township emerged and from 1871 Cobb and Co. coaches arrived regularly. Nerang Creek Heads, as Southport was known at this time, soon became a holiday destination for some of the colony's elite, with several large houses built overlooking the sea. By the end of the 1870s numerous stores, a hotel and a jetty had been established and visitors could either travel from Brisbane by coach or along the coast by boat.

In the 1880s the popularity of Southport as a seaside holiday destination surged and it was soon the principal seaside resort in Queensland. The construction of major schools, banks, guesthouses and more hotels stimulated Southport's growth as a fashionable 19th century resort, as did the presence of the Governor of Queensland's residence in the 1890s.

In 1885 a rail line to Loganlea from Yeerongpilly was opened, and soon after reached Beenleigh. Subsequent requests were made to the government for the extension of the line to the South Coast. A detailed survey was carried out by the Department of Railways, and in 1885 Queensland Parliament authorised the construction of this railway line extension. The line would divide in two, with a branch to Southport and another to Nerang. Although the provision of transport for passengers to the holiday destination was an important factor, the foremost consideration was to provide efficient transportation for farm produce.

The line between Beenleigh and Southport/Nerang was named the South Coast Railway Line. The construction of the 30-mile (48 km) line was contracted to experienced railway builder, George Bashford in 1886. Despite a good start, floods in January 1887 delayed the work, which resulted in Bashford becoming insolvent and disappearing. The Queensland National Bank then took over the project. Along the line, 10 stations were constructed (with Yatala and Coombabah closing in 1891), as well as three substantial bridges over the Albert River, Coomera River, and Nerang River.

Only one tunnel was planned along this line. Initially known as the Southport Junction tunnel, it cut through a large hill between Coombabah and Southport Junction stations. The tunnel was concrete, 114 metres (374 ft)long and located at a depth of 23 metres (75 ft) from the crest of the hill. It curved to the right just after its western entrance, providing no straight view through the tunnel. Construction had begun by April 1887 when it was reported that:

"a top heading has been driven from each end, and a shaft has been sunk midway from the crown. The tunnel consists of very hard rock and entails heavy work".

On 1 July 1887, a tragic accident occurred when three of the men constructing the tunnel, McDuffy, O'Brien and Christidon, were buried by 3 feet (0.91 m) of debris following an explosion from the dynamite they were using to blast the rock. The three men "were attempting a second time to fire off a dynamite blast, it unexpectedly exploded". O'Brien and Christidon survived the accident. McDuffy was killed.

In December 1888, further progress was outlined in The Telegraph which stated that the "tunnel is six chains long and is carried through hard blue rock. It is lined with concrete, the height being 15 feet above railway level. The hill, through which the tunnel is taken, is about 68 feet above rail level". The tunnel was completed by January 1889.

The replacement of brick or stone with concrete for tunnel linings was a recent technical development in Queensland. The 1880s was an important period for the adoption of concrete for the construction of Queensland Railway infrastructure. Concrete was first used during the extension of the Southern railway line from Warwick to Stanthorpe (constructed 1878–1881) due to the influence of civil engineer Charles Lambert Depree. Resident engineer on the extension from 1875 to 1878, Depree is attributed with the design of concrete culverts, the Gorge Dam retaining wall and the Cherry Gully Tunnel on the line. The Cherry Gully tunnel was the first tunnel in Queensland to use concrete; however, it was partially constructed with brick. Henry Charles Stanley, Chief Engineer of the Railway Department, reported in 1880 that the use of concrete, instead of bricks, for the tunnel provided a considerable saving for the department. Another saving gained by using concrete was the ability to utilise cheaper, unskilled labour to carry out the work, rather than skilled brick-layers. The 1882 Normanby Tunnel (no longer extant) on the Brisbane exhibition loop was wholly constructed of concrete, followed by the Woolloongabba Branch Tunnel in 1884 (no longer extant). The construction of the Ernest Junction Tunnel occurred at the same time as the fifteen built for the ascent of the coastal range for the Cairns-to-Kuranda railway line, although the South Coast line opened earlier.

By the time the Ernest Junction Tunnel was constructed, standardised drawings were used, with variations made to suit each individual tunnel. For example, at Ernest Junction the tunnel's dimensions and semi-elliptical portals were standard; however, the length and curve and gradient in the track differed from other tunnels. Other examples of the early use of concrete lining in tunnels are the Dularcha railway tunnel (1890); the Yimbun railway tunnel (1910); and the Muntapa Tunnel (1913).

On 25 January 1889 the line to Southport was officially opened. Dignitaries travelled from Brisbane to Southport railway station where they were greeted by several hundred people celebrating the occasion. Six months later, in July 1890, the branch to Nerang railway station was opened with considerably less fanfare. Southport Junction Station was at the divide of the line, with the two separate branches, Southport (to the east of the station) and Nerang (to the south of the station), leaving from there. In 1890, the Southport Junction station's name was changed to Ernest Junction Station, to honour the respected local Member of Parliament at the time, Ernest James Stevens. The name of the tunnel was also changed to the Ernest Junction tunnel. Initially, all trains travelled to Southport from Ernest Junction. A separate branch shuttle was provided to take passengers to Nerang from Ernest Junction.

Not long after the opening of the Southport/Nerang line, representatives from the district requested the South Coast line be extended to Coolangatta and Tweed Heads. A coach service had been taking passengers from the Nerang station to the increasingly popular holiday destinations at Coolangatta and Tweed Heads. It was believed that a line extension would also benefit the farming communities along the requested railway line. In December 1900 Queensland Parliament approved the rail extension, which was completed by September 1903. The opening was reported in The Telegraph which stated that the "railway to the Tweed Heads will be opened today without ceremony". It was intended that the Tweed Heads line would eventually link up to the New South Wales rail network from Murwillumbah; however, this did not eventuate.

The new rail extension increased Ernest Junction Station's importance. As the terminus for the three lines (Ernest Junction to Brisbane, Ernest Junction to Southport and Ernest Junction to Nerang and Tweed Heads) its new role was to divide trains arriving from South Brisbane, to provide separate services to and from Southport and Tweed Heads. A train from South Brisbane with carriages separately assigned for Southport and Tweed Heads passengers would arrive at Ernest Junction Station. The Tweed Heads bound passenger carriages were detached and reattached to another engine, which travelled south to Coolangatta and Tweed Heads, via Nerang. The original train with passengers destined for Southport would continue east. Conversely, trains arriving separately from Southport and Tweed Heads would be combined to form a South Brisbane-bound train.

With the extension of the line to Tweed Heads, another concrete tunnel was constructed at West Burleigh in 1900. This tunnel was slightly shorter than Ernest Junction, being 87 metres (285 ft). It has since been demolished to make way for road construction.

At the time the line was extended to Tweed Heads, surf bathing was becoming increasingly popular. Younger holiday-goers were choosing the more exciting and challenging surf beaches, rather than still-water resorts such as Southport. Due to the rail extension, Coolangatta attracted thousands of visitors, eager to visit the fashionable seaside destination. In 1903 just under 7000 passengers arrived at Tweed Heads railway station and ten years later this had risen to 16,522 passengers. Guest houses and hotels were rapidly established at Coolangatta and over the border in Tweed Heads. Photographs taken at the time depict crowds of visitors disembarking at Tweed Heads railway station for a weekend at the beach. The extension of the line also provided farmers in areas such as Currumbin and Tallebudgera with an efficient means of despatching produce to Brisbane markets, or of sending milk and cream to butter factories in the region.

Southport, Coolangatta and Tweed Heads continued to be popular seaside destinations throughout the interwar period. During World War II the South Coast railway line provided transportation to American troops on Rest and Recreation Leave, with several large camps established at Coolangatta.

The motor car became more affordable and war-time petrol rationing ceased in the 1950s. The new trend for holiday makers was to drive to the coast, rather than take the train. From 1925 the Jubilee Bridge crossed the mouth of the Nerang River to the surf beaches later known as Main Beach, Surfers Paradise and Broadbeach, with the road extending down the coast to Tweed Heads. Regular bus services between Brisbane and the South Coast, which had been established in the 1920s, were greatly improved in the 1950s.

Residential development transformed the South Coast in the 1950s and early 60s, with developments including the canal estates at Surfers Paradise, as well as tourist-based facilities such as hotels and motels, all conveniently accessed by car. By the 1960s the South Coast was increasingly called the Gold Coast. The rail-line was situated at a considerable distance inland from these surf beaches and holiday centres. As a result, rail travel to the South Coast declined and the Queensland Government decided to close the South Coast line for economic reasons.

Although the Coolangatta railway station was situated walking distance to the beach, unlike Surfers Paradise, the line from Nerang to Tweed Heads was closed on 30 June 1961. The Ernest Junction to Nerang line was closed in May 1964. The Beenleigh to Southport line, despite considerable community protests, was closed on 1 July 1964.

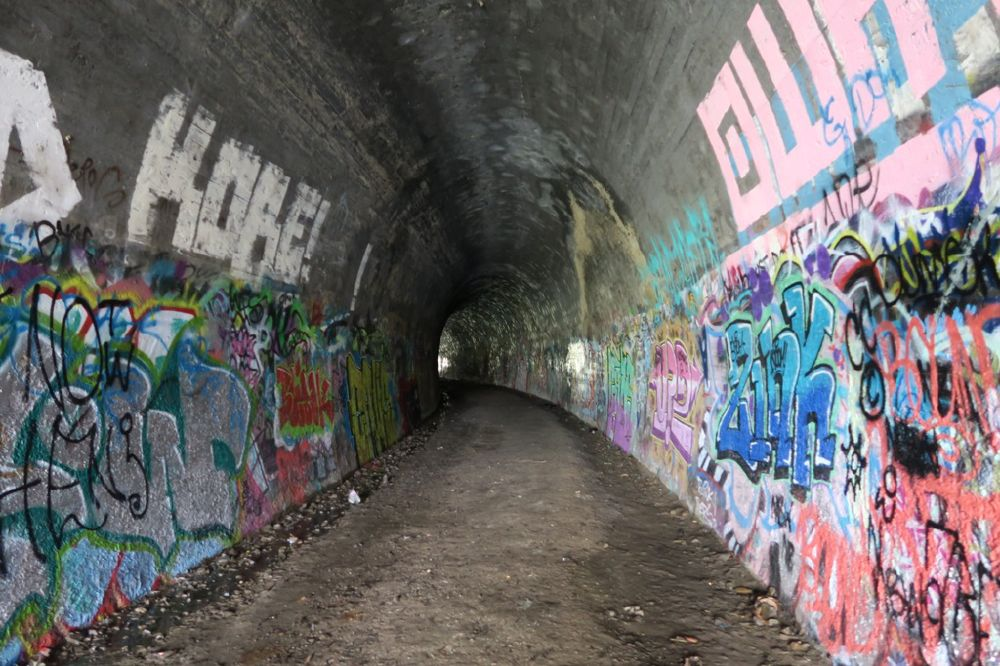
Looking west from east portal, 2019

After its closure and the removal of the tracks, the Ernest Junction tunnel was open for vehicular access until gates were placed on the eastern entrance. For several years the tunnel was leased by a business who used it to grow mushrooms commercially. In the late 1990s large boulders were placed at both tunnel entrances. The Ernest Junction Tunnel Friends group was established in 2014. It carried out extensive clearing of overgrowth, removed rubbish from the tunnel and installed interpretive signage at the site. Following the tunnel's clearing, it has become a hub for artists, photographers, history and railway enthusiasts, film students, and community and activity groups.

The majority of the former South Coast line's infrastructure has been removed since its closure. The Ernest Junction tunnel is the only extant tunnel and one of only three railway remnants of the line; the others are the Currumbin Creek Railway Bridge and the Nerang railway station which has been moved to the Gold Coast Hinterland Heritage Museum at Mudgeeraba. In 2019 the tunnel is part of a bushland reserve with walking tracks leading to the tunnel from the eastern approach.

== Description ==
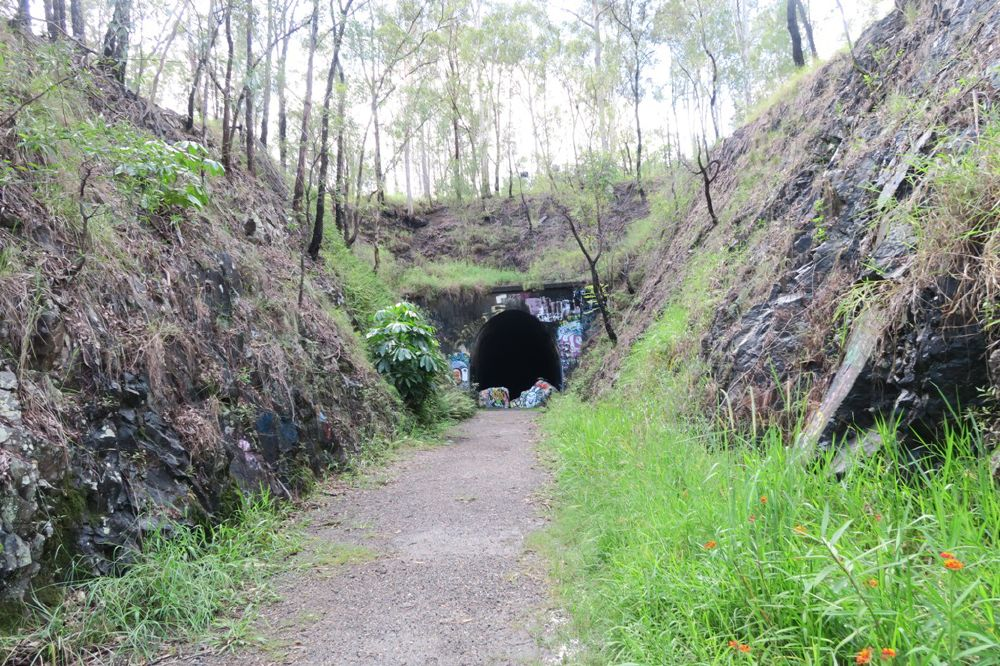
Western portal and approach cuttings, 2019

The Ernest Junction railway tunnel is located approximately six kilometres west of the centre of Southport on the Gold Coast. The surrounding suburb of Molendinar is a mixed industrial and residential area, bounded by the Pacific Motorway to the west and Smith Street Motorway to the north. The tunnel passes beneath Ashmore Road, just south of the intersection with Zane Street.

No longer functioning as part of a railway line, the tunnel runs in an approximately east–west direction with a curve to the south in the eastern half. The tunnel is approached on both sides by cuttings with steeply sloping sides through densely vegetated bushland. In 2019, the western approach to the tunnel is a rail reserve and the eastern approach is a conservation estate known as Activity Crescent Reserve. The western tunnel portal can be accessed from Ashmore Road via a dirt track. The eastern tunnel portal can be accessed from the Activity Crescent Reserve.

=== Railway tunnel (1885-89) ===
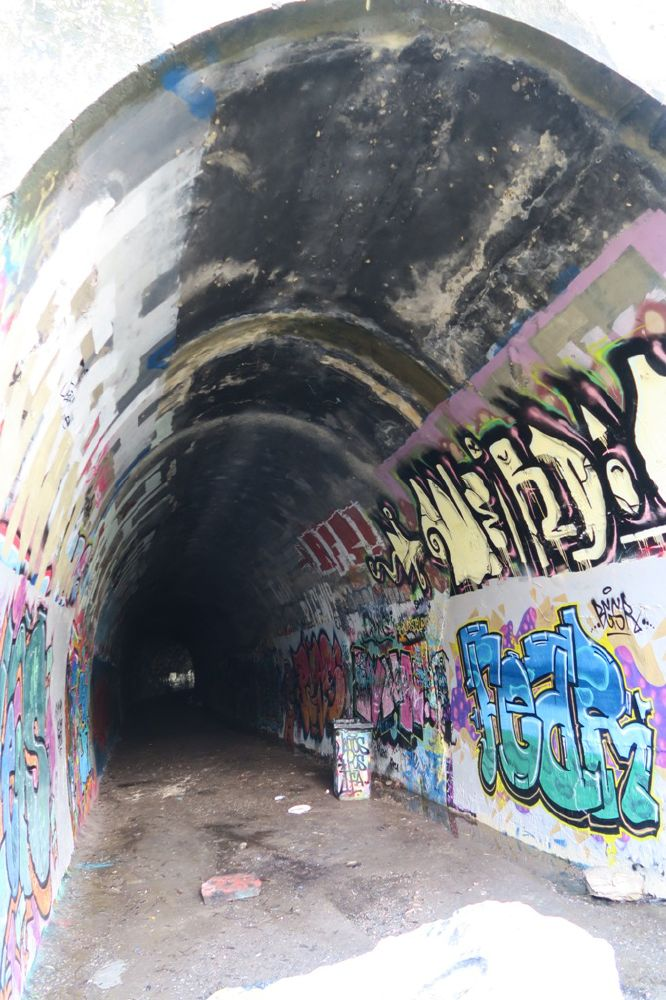
Soot and smoke staining, 2019

The Ernest Junction railway tunnel is a 114 metres (374 ft) long, semi-elliptical, concrete-lined tunnel with a curvature to the south at the east end. It has a base width of 4.4 metres (14 ft), a girth width of 4.6 metres (15 ft), a crown height at its apex of 4.9 metres, and a 1:66 gradient against north-bound traffic. The tracks and sleepers have been removed and the floor is earth.

The rock cuttings that lead to each portal have a rough finish that is evidence of the dynamite blasting used to construct the tunnel. A section of stabilising stone coursing is located on the south side of the cutting at the western portal just outside the tunnel entrance.

The concrete portals are faced with a smooth concrete render surmounted by a shallow projecting ledge. The stucco finish continues inside the tunnel at each end. There is evidence of soot and smoke staining on the tunnel roof.

=== Setting and views ===
The track approach to the western portal is dirt with added gravel, while the approach to the eastern portal leading from the end of the concrete pathway is grassed, passing through an open area containing interpretive signage. The landscape and heavily wooded surrounds limit views of the tunnel to the immediate approaches to the rock cuttings and portals.
