= Molendinar, Queensland =

Molendinar
- Suburb
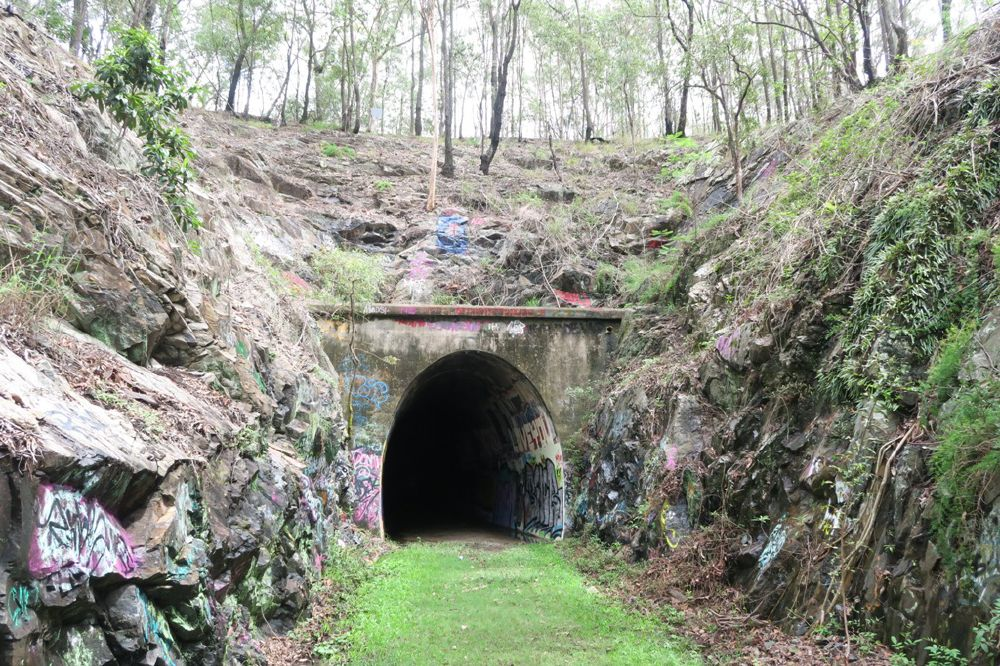
- Ernest Junction railway tunnel, eastern portal, 2019

- Interactive map of Molendinar
- Coordinates: 27.9736°S 153.3613°E
- Country: Australia
- State: Queensland
- City: Gold Coast
- LGA: City of Gold Coast
- Location: 5.7 km (3.5 mi) W of Southport; 8.0 km (5.0 mi) NW of Surfers Paradise; 72.5 km (45.0 mi) SE of Brisbane CBD

Government
  - State electorate: Southport
  - Federal division: Moncrieff

Area
  - Total: 7.7 km^{2} (3.0 sq mi)

Population
  - Total: 6,450 (2021 census)
  - Density: 838/km^{2} (2,170/sq mi)
- Time zone: UTC+10:00 (AEST)
- Postcode: 4214
Suburbs around Molendinar
Arundel	Parkwood	Southport
Gaven	Molendinar	Southport
Nerang	Ashmore	Ashmore

Molendinar (/ˌmɒlənˈdaɪnər/ MOL-ən-DY-nər) is a mixed-use suburb in the City of Gold Coast, Queensland, Australia. In the 2021 census, Molendinar had a population of 6,450 people.

== Geography ==
The suburb is bounded by Smith Street Motorway to the north, Olsen Avenue to the east, the Southport Nerang Road to the south and Pacific Motorway to the west.

The land use is a mixture of residential areas and industrial areas.

== History ==
Jerringan is the Aboriginal name for the area meaning stringybark tree.

The suburb takes its name from the former Molendinar railway station (27.9855°S 153.3560°E) on the South Coast railway line (opened in 1889 and closed in 1964). The railway station in turn was named after a farm selected by George Hope named after Molendinar Burn, a stream which once flowed through central Glasgow in Scotland. Ernest Junction railway station (27.9701°S 153.3588°E) was another former railway station on the South Coast line in the north of the present-day suburb.

The area was known as Silver Bridle in the 1960s. Molendinar incorporated a previous suburb known as Ernest on its northern range until 1989 when the suburb got renamed to Parkwood but however Molendinar’s Industrial Estate & part of Smith Street Motorway were known as Ernest until 2003.

The Molendinar Industrial Estate was a Queensland Government project supported by the Gold Coast City Council which commenced development beginning in 1969.

Trinity Lutheran Primary School opened at Cotlew Street, Ashmore, on 27 January 1981.

Trinity Lutheran College (a secondary school) opened on 28 January 1987 on Ashmore Road in Molendinar.

In 2002 the two Lutheran schools merged to form Trinity Lutheran College (a primary and secondary school) operating on two campuses at Cotlew Street in Ashmore and Ashmore Road in Molendinar.

On 2 April 2012, an official dedication of the Lynne Richardson Community Centre was held by the Gold Coast City Council.

== Demographics ==
In the 2011 census, Molendinar had a population of 6,375 people.

In the 2016 census, Molendinar had a population of 6,375 people. The median age of people in Molendinar was 36 years.

In the 2021 census, Molendinar had a population of 6,450 people.

== Heritage listings ==
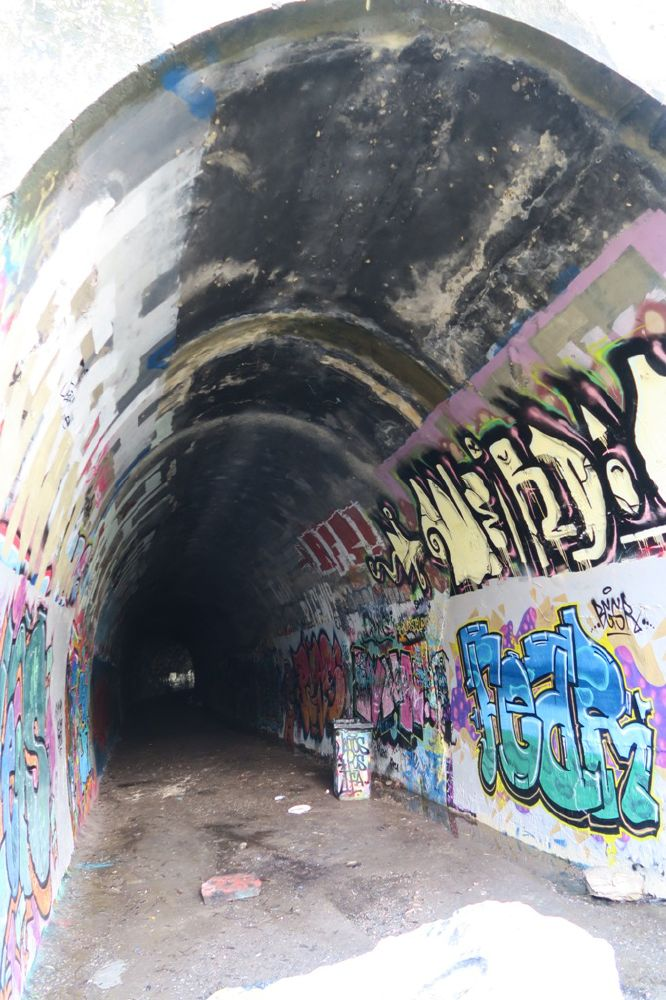
Ernest Junction Railway Tunnel, west entrance, 2019

There are a number of heritage sites in Molendinar, including at 797 Ashmore Road (27.9654°S 153.3558°E): Ernest Junction Railway Tunnel The tunnel is another remnant of the South Coast line. The tunnel has a length of 110 metres.

== Education ==
Trinity Lutheran College is a private primary and secondary school for boys and girls which operates its primary (Prep-5) campus at 641 Ashmore Road (27.9792°S 153.36354°E). In 2017, the school (both campuses combined) had an enrolment of 1,050 students with 85 teachers (76 full-time equivalent) and 62 non-teaching staff (35 full-time equivalent).

There are no government schools in Molendinar. The nearest government primary schools are Ashmore State School in neighbouring Ashmore and Nerang State School in Nerang. The nearest government secondary schools are Keebra Park State High School in Southport and Nerang State High School in Nerang.

== Amenities ==
Lynne Richardson Community Centre is at 2A Gidgee Court (27.9782°S 153.3723°E).
