= Park Wood, Bedford =

Nature reserve in Bedford, England

Coordinates: 52.156819°N 0.471679°W

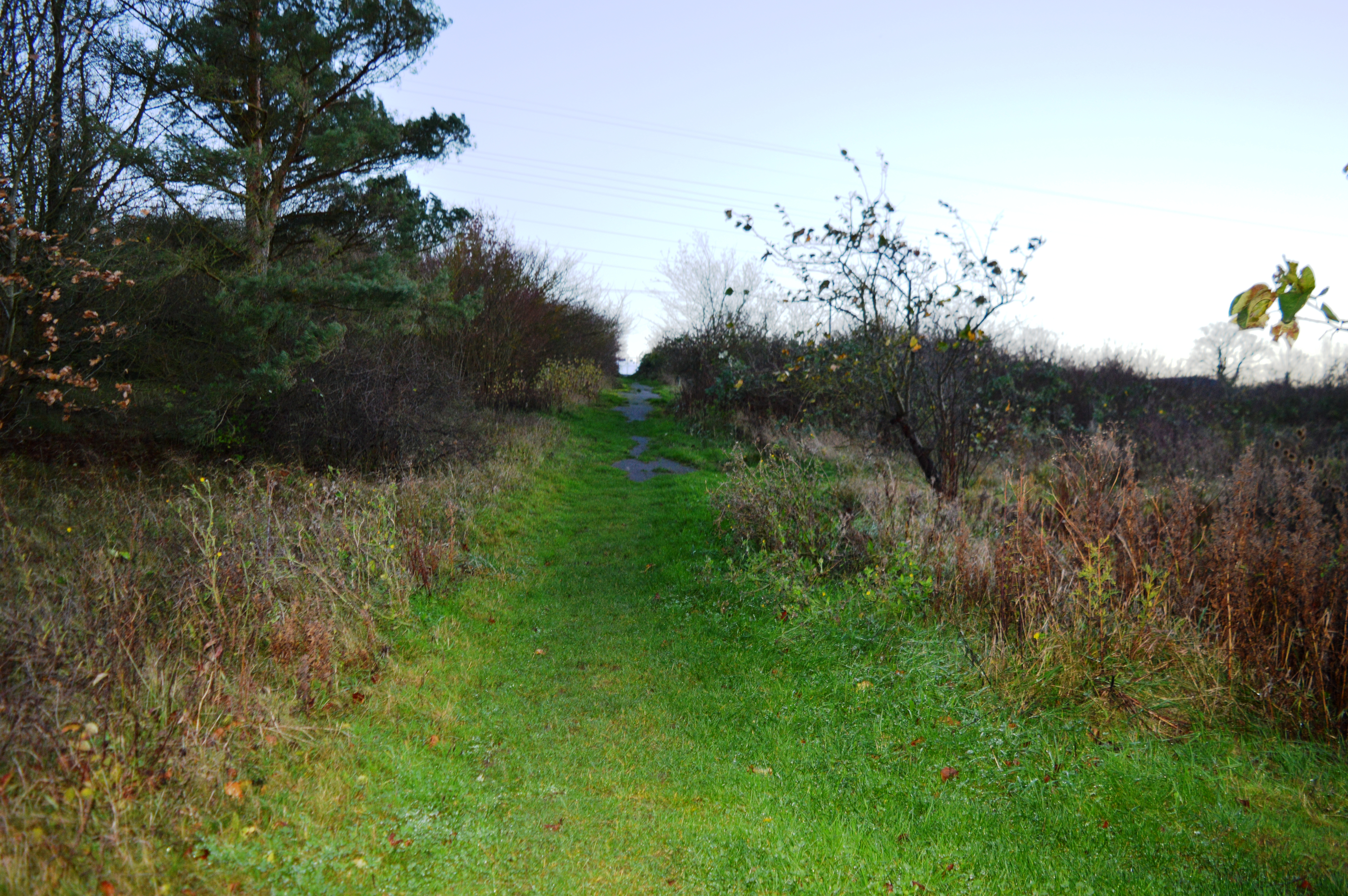

Park Wood is a 5.2 hectare Local Nature Reserve located in the Brickhill area of Bedford. It is owned by Bedford Borough Council and managed by the council with the assistance of the Friends of Park Wood.

The site has diverse habitats with mature trees, grassland, scrub and ponds. Flowers include bee and pyramidal orchids. An orchard has been planted with traditional fruit trees.

There is access by a footpath from Brickhill Drive opposite Eagle Gardens.
