= Park Wood, Chilham =

Site of Special Scientific Interest in Kent, England

Coordinates: 51.236°N 0.925°E

- Site of Special Scientific Interest
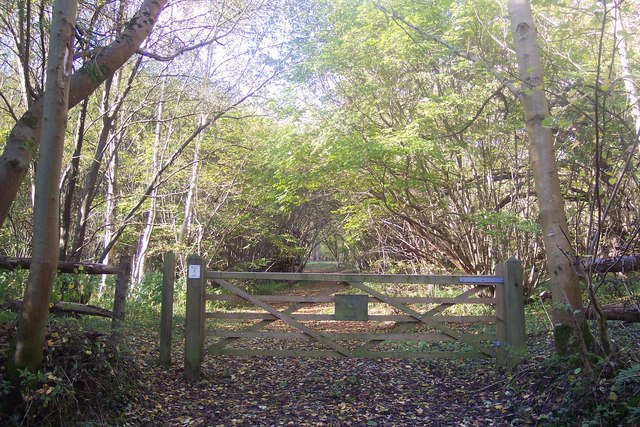
- Location of Park Wood, Chilham.
- Area of search: Kent
- Grid reference: TR 043 526
- Interest: Biological
- Area: 31.1 hectares (77 acres)
- Notification date: 1985
- Location map: Magic Map

Park Wood is a 31.1-hectare (77-acre) biological Site of Special Scientific Interest west of Chilham in Kent.

This wood is mainly hazel and hornbeam coppice with oak standards, and diverse shrub and ground layers. There are many breeding birds and invertebrates, including two which are rare, the wasp Crossocerus distinguendus and the soldier fly Stratiomys potamida.

There is access from the A252 road.

== See also ==
- Down Bank SSSI across the valley
- Wye and Crundale Downs
