= Park Wood, Cambridgeshire =

Protected area in Cambridgeshire, England

Coordinates: 52.165°N 0.396°E

Park Wood
- Site of Special Scientific Interest
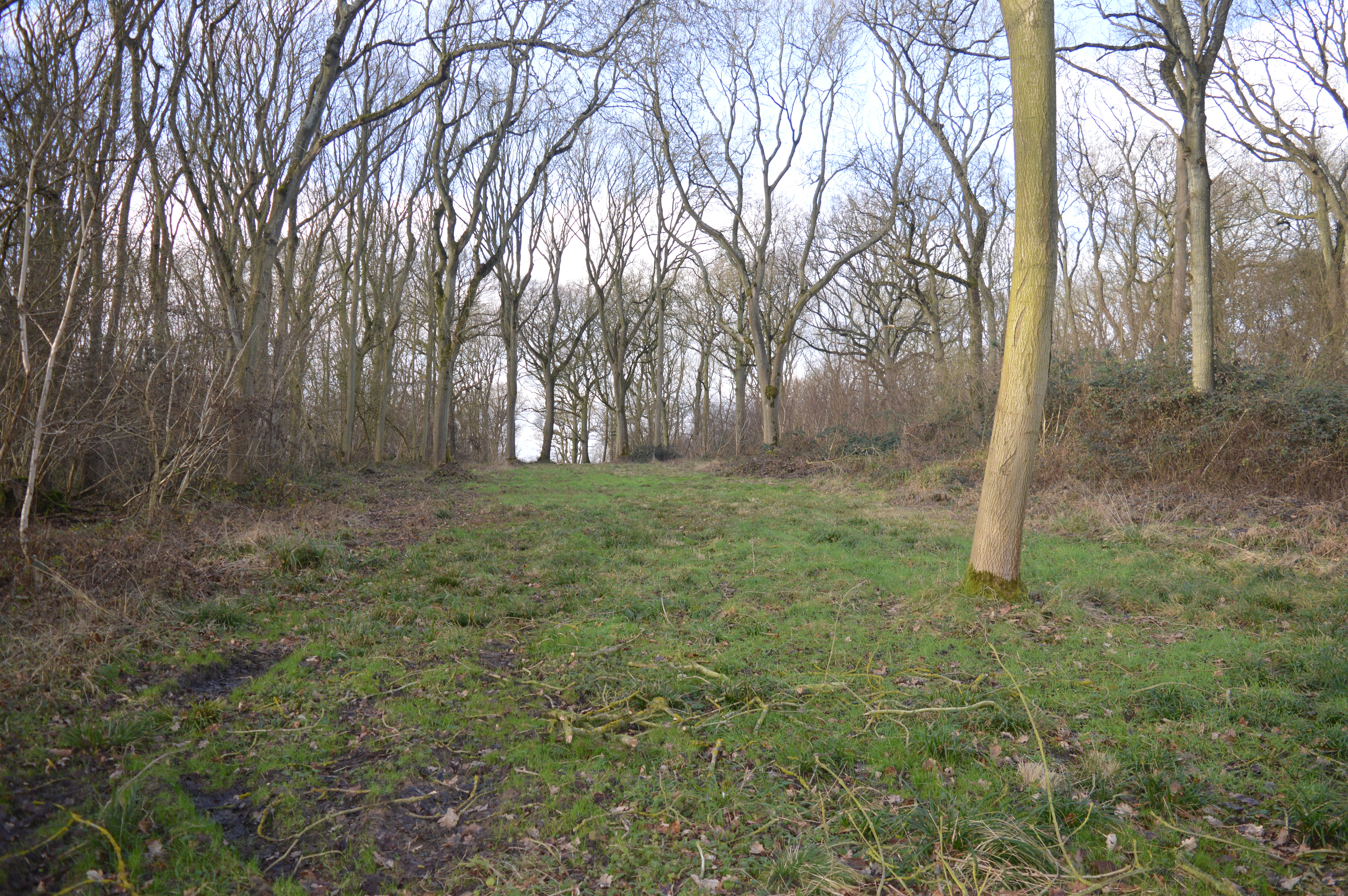
- Location of Park Wood.
- Area of search: Cambridgeshire
- Grid reference: TL 640 546
- Interest: Biological
- Area: 8.1 hectares
- Notification date: 1984
- Location map: Magic Map

Park Wood is an 8.1-hectare (20-acre) biological Site of Special Scientific Interest east of Brinkley in Cambridgeshire.

This is woodland of the wet ash/maple type, a scarce and declining habitat. Ground flora include bluebell, dog’s mercury and oxlip, and there are indicators of ancient woodland such as herb-paris and butterfly-orchid.

The site is private land with no public access.
