= Parkwood Elementary School =

Parkwood Elementary School may refer to:

- Parkwood Elementary School, a school in the Beavercreek City School District
- Parkwood Heights Elementary School
