= South Brisbane railway station =

Railway station in Queensland, Australia

South Brisbane
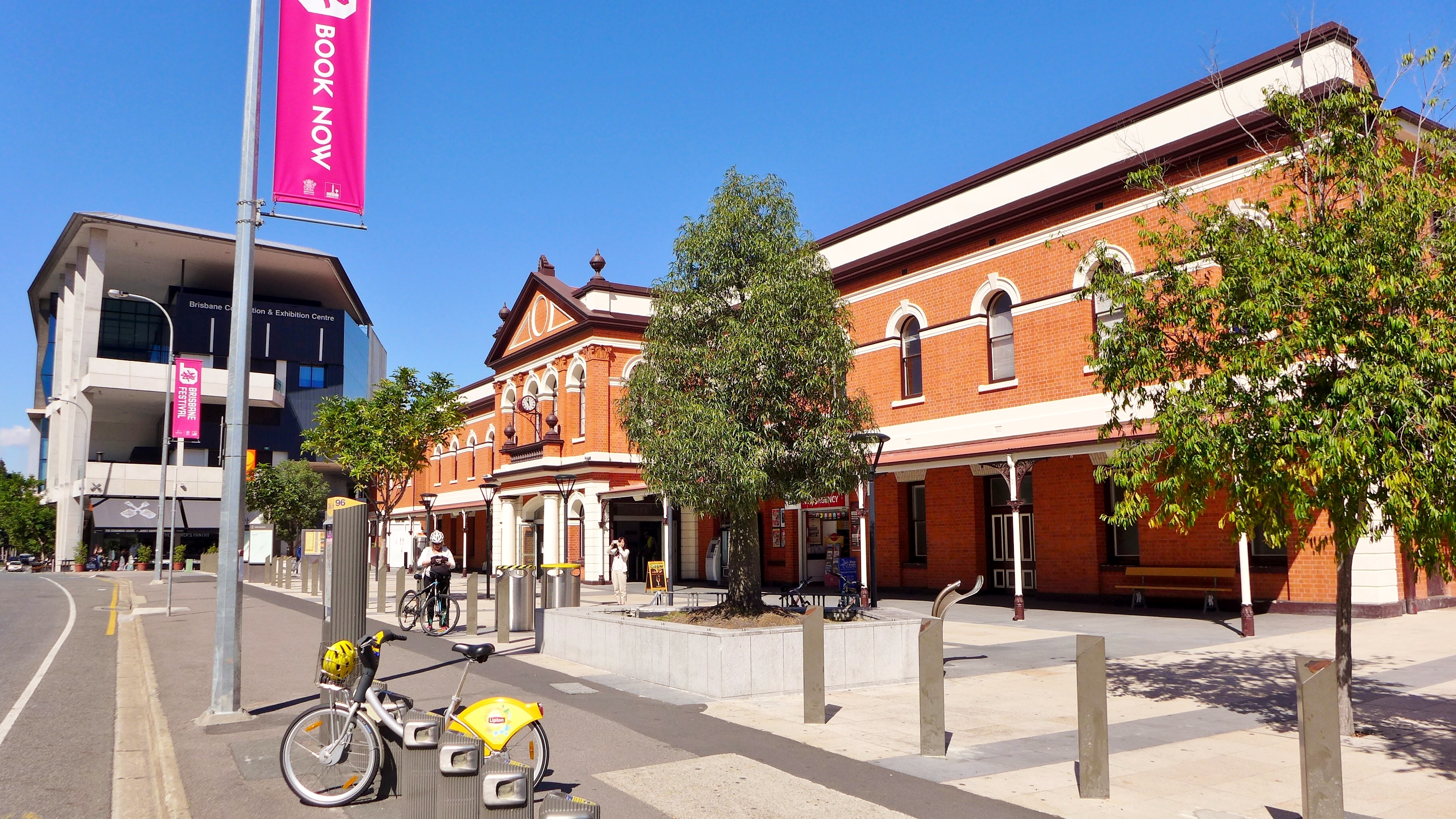
- Station building and entrance in August 2017

General information
- Location: Grey Street, South Brisbane
- Coordinates: 27°28′30″S 153°01′07″E
- Elevation: 9 metres (30 ft)
- Owner: Queensland Rail
- Operator: Queensland Rail
- Lines: T6 Beenleigh; T4 Cleveland; T5 Varsity Lakes
- Distance: 2.63 kilometres (1.63 mi) from Central
- Platforms: 3 (1 side, 1 island)
- Tracks: 4
- Connections: Cultural Centre busway station

Construction
- Structure type: Elevated
- Accessible: Yes

Other information
- Station code: 600012 (platform 1); 600186 (platform 2); 600187 (platform 3)
- Fare zone: Zone 1
- Website: Queensland Rail

History
- Opened: 1884; 142 years ago
- Rebuilt: 1891; 135 years ago, 1978; 48 years ago
- Former names: Melbourne Street

Services
Preceding station	Queensland Rail	Following station
Roma Street towards Ferny Grove	Beenleigh line	South Bank towards Beenleigh
Roma Street towards Shorncliffe	Cleveland line	South Bank towards Cleveland
Roma Street towards Domestic Airport	Varsity Lakes line	South Bank towards Varsity Lakes
Location

South Brisbane is a railway station operated by Queensland Rail on the Beenleigh, Cleveland and Gold Coast lines. It opened in 1884 as Melbourne Street and serves the South Brisbane area. It is an elevated station, featuring one island platform with two faces and one side platform.

It is the second oldest-railway station in central Brisbane and was added to the Queensland Heritage Register on 21 October 1992.

== History ==
The first station was constructed in 1884 on the corner of Melbourne and Grey Streets and opened as Melbourne Street railway station.

The second and current building was constructed on higher ground in 1891 as the terminus for the new rail extension from Boggo Junction (now Dutton Park railway station). This line bypassed the Woolloongabba railyards and made redundant the Stanley Street railway station that existed from 1882 to 1884. The £77,585 contract was let to Murphy & Company on 2 April 1890, and the line was completed by them on 7 December 1891.

A £5,658 contract for erecting the new passenger station, to be known as South Brisbane railway station, was let to Henry Pears on 22 June 1891. It was the second masonry station to be erected in Brisbane after Roma Street railway station (opening 1875) and pre-dating Central railway station (opening in 1901) by a decade.

Passenger services commenced on 21 December 1891, although the station building had not been completed. For this reason there was no accompanying opening ceremony. When the building opened shortly afterwards it included a temperance refreshment room, and served commuters on the South Coast, Cleveland and Beaudesert lines.

South Brisbane station was intended as a temporary terminus, pending an extension of the line across the river, so only two platforms were constructed. However, after the 1893 flood washed away the Albert Bridge over the Brisbane River at Indooroopilly, the South Brisbane station served as the principal terminus for all southern and western rail services for the next two and a half years.

The Victoria Bridge was also partially washed away, together with telephone wires to the north side of the river. South Brisbane Railway Station was one of only five or six places that remained connected with the north side by telephone. In the adjoining Melbourne-street post and telegraph office the water rose to a height of 56 inches (1.4 m) on the upper floor. The Railway Commissioners granted PMG the use of a suitable room in the South Brisbane Railway Station until repairs were carried out.

A 1912–1913 proposal to expand South Brisbane station to a six platform station reflected the increasing importance of the southern rail network, both as a passenger service and as a goods line. This work was undertaken between 1914 and 1918. To handle the increased traffic a 40-foot (12 m) turntable was constructed in 1916, which was expanded to 60 feet (18 m) in 1925. This was removed with the change-over to diesel engines in 1968.

In September 1930, the Southern Brisbane Interstate station opened to the west of the existing station on the site of the present Brisbane Convention & Exhibition Centre, when the standard gauge New South Wales North Coast line was extended from Kyogle. It was the terminus for the Brisbane Limited.

On 18 November 1978, the narrow-gauge line was extended, via the Merivale Bridge from South Brisbane station into Roma Street station on the opposite side of the Brisbane River. As the interstate station at South Brisbane was to be demolished to make way for the World Expo 88 site, the standard gauge services were extended to the Brisbane Transit Centre, an extension of Roma Street station, on 21 June 1986, making the Transit Centre the interstate terminal.

Since two of the c. 1918 island platforms at South Brisbane were removed to accommodate the cross-river line, the South Brisbane station was reduced to its two original two platforms. However, in 1995, as part of the construction of the Gold Coast line, the standard gauge line was converted to dual gauge and Platform 3 which had been out of use since November 1978, was recommissioned.

From 31 October 2011, the station was closed for seven weeks for major structural works and raising the platforms. Trains still travelled through South Brisbane during that period but did not stop.

== Description ==
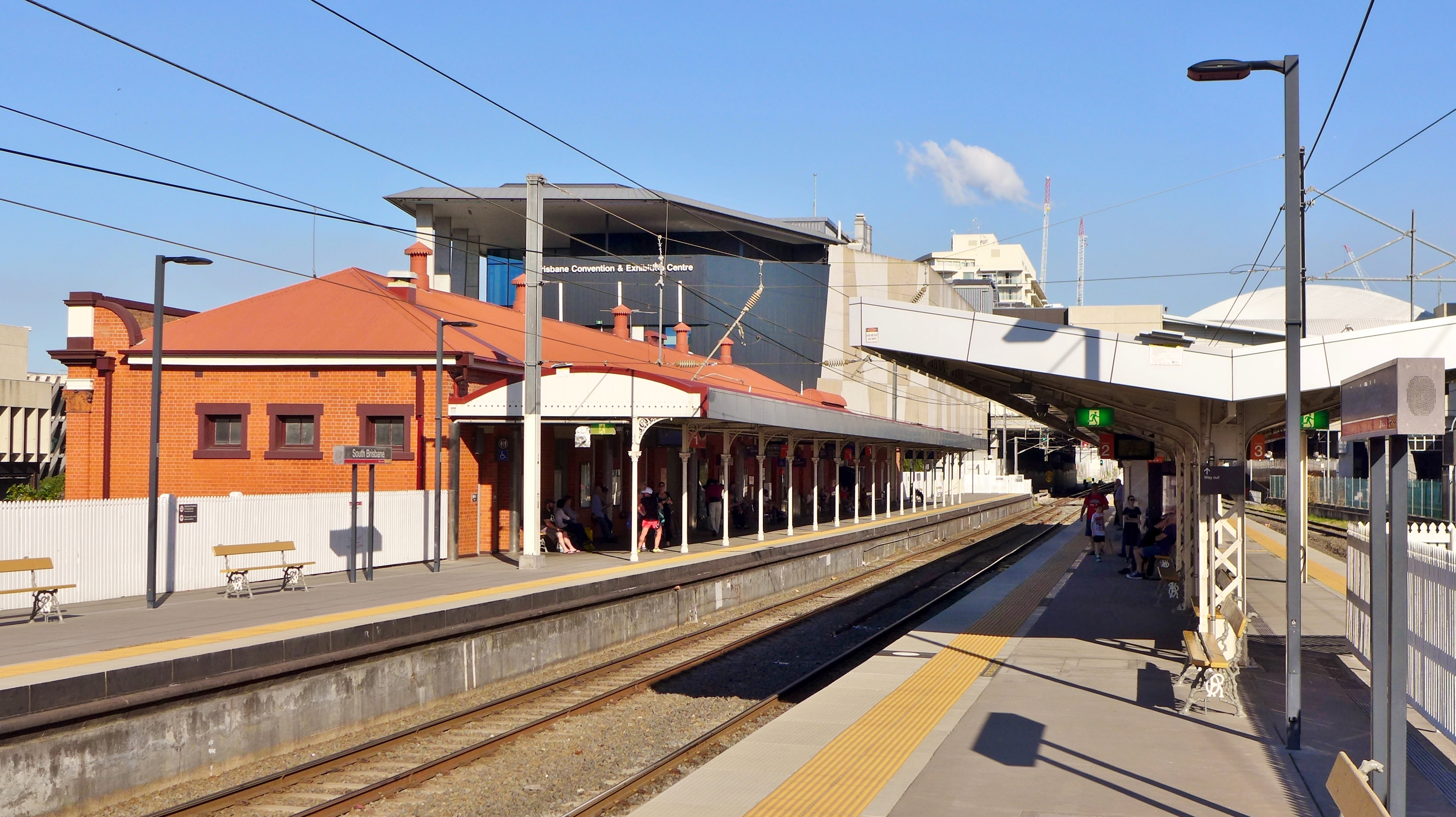
The station platforms in August 2017

The station is a long, two-storeyed brick building with a hipped corrugated-iron roof. The Grey Street frontage is dominated by a central projecting pedimented entrance. Either side of the entrance are sloping corrugated-iron street awnings, which are supported by cast-iron columns with Corinthian capitals and large brackets.

Other Renaissance stylistic elements to the street facade include: Romanesque windows on the upper floor, rendered string courses and window mouldings, pilasters with Corinthian capitals, and a solid rendered parapet.

A former garden park in front of the Grey Street entrance is now a car park/loading bay.

At the rear of the station building are the platforms, which were constructed level with the upper floor of the main building, in anticipation of the river extension. The awning to No 1 platform retains a tank roof on a steel frame, with cast-iron columns and brackets and a decorative timber frieze (1891). No 2 platform has a cantilevered butterfly roof (bullnosed until recent re-roofing), which is supported by lattice iron girders (c. 1918.

On both platforms the furniture consists of a considerable number of early cast-iron framed seats which incorporate the QR logo. Many of these were collected from other Brisbane metropolitan stations for the Expo '88 refurbishment, and have remained.

As preparation for Expo '88 the external brickwork and cast iron was restored, the roof was replaced, and all the exterior brickwork except for the upper level front facade was painted an uncharacteristic pink or peach. Interior renovations included false ceilings, a new staircase for office staff, and repainting.

The main building at the South Brisbane Railway Station remains substantially intact, despite interior alteration, but the turntable, two island platforms, and the front park and garden have been removed.

== Platforms and services ==
South Brisbane platform arrangement
Platform	Line	Destination	Notes
1	Beenleigh	Beenleigh	
1	Cleveland	Cleveland	
1	Gold Coast	Varsity Lakes	
2	Beenleigh	Roma Street (to Ferny Grove line)	
2	Cleveland	Roma Street (to Shorncliffe line	
2	Cleveland	Roma Street (to Doomben line	Morning peak only
2	Gold Coast	Roma Street (to Airport line)	
3	Gold Coast	Roma Street (to Airport line)	Peak hours only
3	Gold Coast	Roma Street (To Doomben line)	Morning peak only

== Transport links ==
Adjacent to the station lies the Cultural Centre busway station that is served by Transport for Brisbane bus services.

== Adjacent attractions ==
The station is very convenient to the Queensland Cultural Centre, including the Queensland Museum, the Queensland Performing Arts Centre, and the State Library.

The station is also very conveniently located to the Queensland Conservatorium and Suncorp Piazza, which are both situated within the South Bank Parklands.
