= Marsden, Queensland =

Marsden
- Suburb
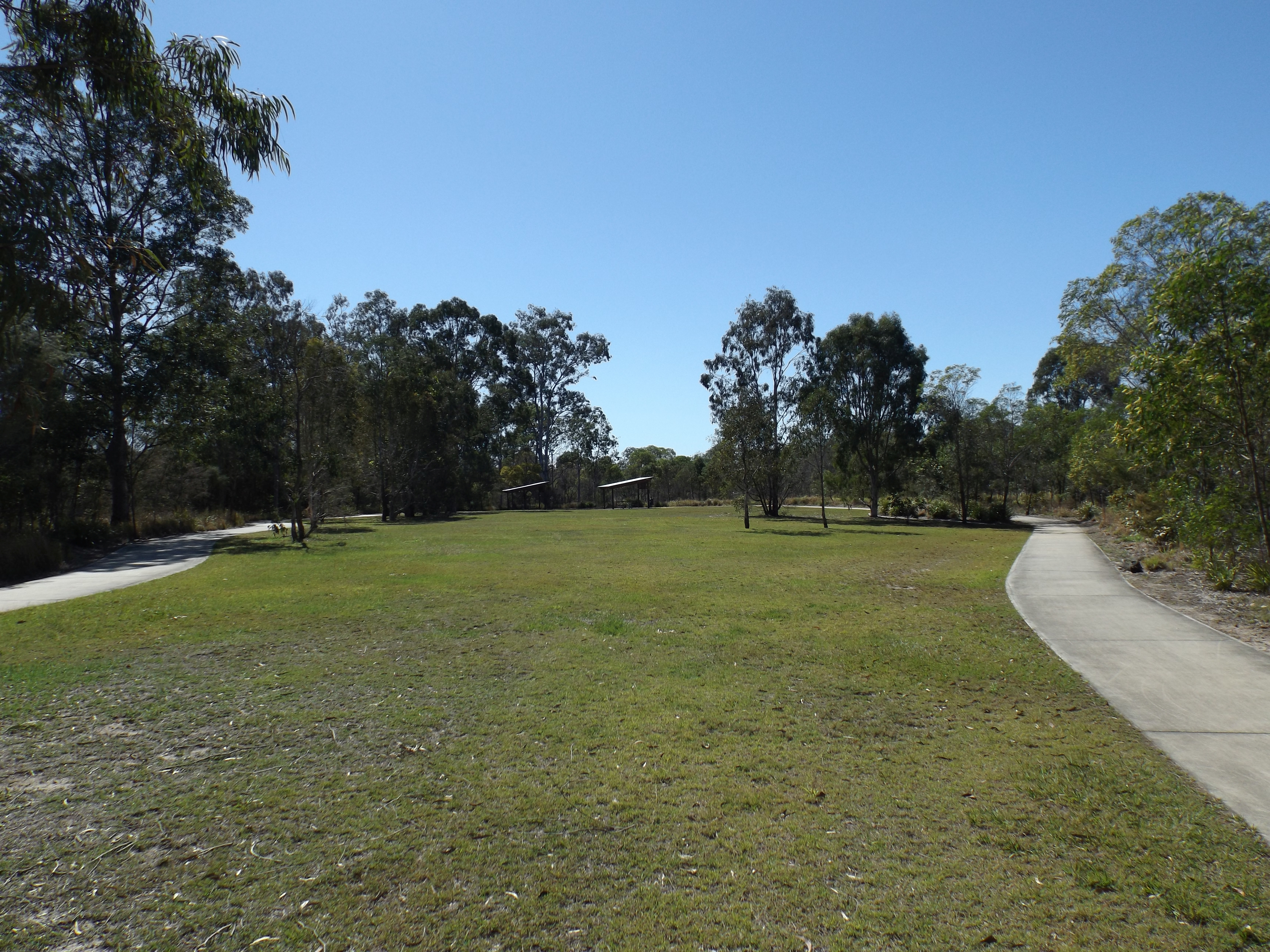
- Berrinba Wetlands, 2014

- Interactive map of Marsden
- Coordinates: 27.6736°S 153.0988°E
- Country: Australia
- State: Queensland
- City: Logan City
- LGA: Logan City
- Location: 4.8 km (3.0 mi) S of Logan Central; 32.2 km (20.0 mi) S of Brisbane CBD

Government
  - State electorate: Woodridge
  - Federal division: Rankin

Area
  - Total: 6.1 km^{2} (2.4 sq mi)

Population
  - Total: 14,795 (2021 census)
  - Density: 2,425/km^{2} (6,280/sq mi)
- Time zone: UTC+10:00 (AEST)
- Postcode: 4132
Suburbs around Marsden
Berrinba	Kingston	Kingston
Berrinba	Marsden	Kingston
Crestmead	Crestmead	Waterford West

Marsden is a suburb in the City of Logan, Queensland, Australia. In the 2021 census, Marsden had a population of 14,795 people.

== Geography ==
Located 4 km south of Logan Central and 24 km south of central Brisbane, most of the area has been developed into housing estates. Prior 1980, Marsden was divided between the Albert and Beaudesert Shires along Browns Plains Road, however, after the abolishment of Albert Shire in 1979; Marsden became entirely within Logan City. The suburb of Crestmead is the adjoining suburb to the south. The northern boundary of the suburb roughly runs parallel to the Logan Motorway. The industrial estate of Marsden is in the south-west of the suburb.

== History ==
Marsden was originally part of Kingston, known as the Kingston Park Estate, until 1 May 1976, when the Council started to use the name Marsden.

The suburb was named after Violet Marsden, a member of a pioneer family, associated with the Kingston Park and Districts Progress Association.

Between the 1870s and the 1930s, the land was transferred, sold, and subdivided. The first house on the property was built in the 1930s by blacksmith and former Shire Chairman Martin Schneider, where the Marsden Park shopping centre is now located.

In 1944, part of Marsden was again subdivided, but into small farms; known as Kingston Park. These small farms were offered to ex-servicemen and post-war immigrants. By this time amenities in the suburb were extremely limited, with no cleared roads, no reticulated water system, and electricity was not supplied. Telephone and electricity services were installed in the late 1940s and retuclated water in the 1970s.

In January 1956, solicitors sought advice to the exact locations of planned roads for the suburb; a survey of the land was not issued until April 1956.

In 1967, the Kingston Park Progress Association transported an old shed from Sunnybank to Marsden Park and renovated it for a progress hall.

Marsden State School opened on 23 January 1978.

In 1981, the Marsden Industrial Estate opened.

The Marsden Park Shopping Centre opened in 1985. The library was added to it in 1992 and the shopping centre was renovated and expanded in 2006.

Marsden State High School opened on 27 January 1987. The school is now within the boundaries of neighbouring Waterford West.

Burrowes State School opened on 27 January 1987.

St Francis' College opened on 8 February 1988. The school is now with the boundaries of neighbouring Crestmead.

In 1992, the Crestmead Community Centre opened.

1998 saw the opening of the Maximilian Kolbe Catholic Church on Macarthy Road, along with the Islamic Mosque on Third Avenue.

The Cambodian Buddhist Temple was completed in 2005, after 14 years in construction.

The new Marsden Library was constructed and opened in 2006 with a major refurbishment in 2015.

== Demographics ==
In the 2011 census, Marsden recorded a population of 11,278 people, 50.1% female and 49.9% male. The median age of the Marsden population was 27 years, 10 years below the national median of 37. 65.2% of people living in Marsden were born in Australia. The other top responses for country of birth were New Zealand 10.8%, England 2.7%, Samoa 2.1%, Cambodia 1%, Fiji 1%. 76% of people spoke only English at home; the next most common languages were 4.3% Samoan, 1.8% Khmer, 1% Hindi, 0.6% Romanian, 0.5% Spanish.

In the 2016 census, Marsden had a population of 14,071 people, 51.0% female and 49.0% male. The median age of the Marsden population was 28 years, 10 years below the national median of 38. 57.0% of people living in Marsden were born in Australia. The other top responses for country of birth were New Zealand 11.8%, Samoa 2.6%, England 1.9%, Fiji 1.2% and the Philippines 1.1%. 65.7% of people spoke only English at home; the next most common languages were 5.4% Samoan, 1.7% Khmer, 1.7% Arabic, 1.4% Hindi and 0.7% Maori (New Zealand).

In the 2021 census, Marsden had a population of 14,795 people, 50.7% female and 49.3% male. The median age of the Marsden population was 28 years, 10 years below the national median of 38. 55.3% of people living in Marsden were born in Australia. The other top responses for country of birth were New Zealand 9.7%, Myanmar 2.4%, Afghanistan 2.3%, Samoa 2.1%, and England 1.5%. 59.5% of people spoke only English at home; the next most common languages were 4.5% Samoan, 2.3% Arabic, 2.0% Hazaraghi, 1.7% Khmer, and 1.3% Urdu.

== Education ==
Marsden State School is a government primary (Prep–6) school for boys and girls at Hickory Street (27.6846°S 153.1040°E). In 2018, the school had an enrolment of 1,048 students with 70 teachers (66 full-time equivalent) and 39 non-teaching staff (30 full-time equivalent). It includes a special education program.

Burrowes State School is a government primary (Prep–6) school for boys and girls at Third Avenue (27.6762°S 153.0898°E). In 2018, the school had an enrolment of 786 students with 61 teachers (57 full-time equivalent) and 32 non-teaching staff (23 full-time equivalent). It includes a special education program.

There are no secondary schools in Marsden. The nearest government secondary schools are Marsden State High School in neighbouring Waterford West to the south-east and Woodridge State High School in Logan Central to the north-east.

== Amenities ==
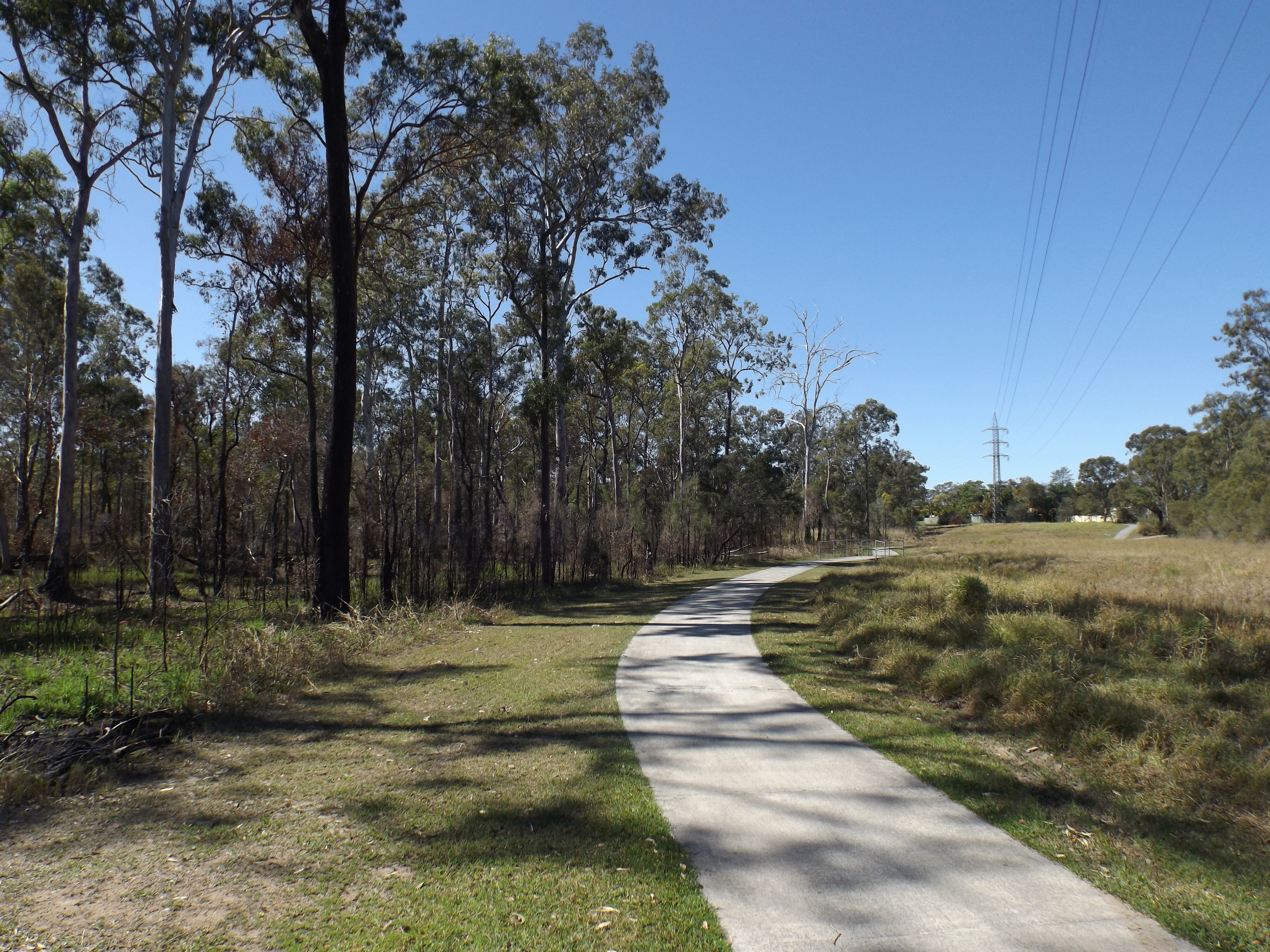
East West Bikeway, 2014

Marsden is also home to Scrubby Creek, which passes along the northern extent of the suburb. Along the creek, from near Third Avenue, through to Marsden Park Shopping Centre area is a series of parks, bike paths and walkways.

The Logan City Council operate a public library at 35 Chambers Flat Road.

== Notable people ==
- Israel Folau
- Chris Sandow
- Cameron Smith
- Joe Tomane
- Antonio Winterstein
