= Division of Moreton =

Australian federal electoral division

Coordinates: 27.564°S 153.031°E

Moreton Australian House of Representatives Division
- Interactive map of boundaries since the 2019 federal election
- Created: 1901
- MP: Julie-Ann Campbell
- Party: Labor
- Namesake: Moreton Bay
- Electors: 109,284 (2025)
- Area: 109 km^{2} (42.1 sq mi)
- Demographic: Inner metropolitan
Electorates around Moreton:
Ryan	Griffith	Griffith
Oxley	Moreton	Bonner
Oxley	Rankin	Rankin

The Division of Moreton is an Australian Electoral Division in Queensland. The current MP is Julie-Ann Campbell of the Australian Labor Party (ALP).

== History ==
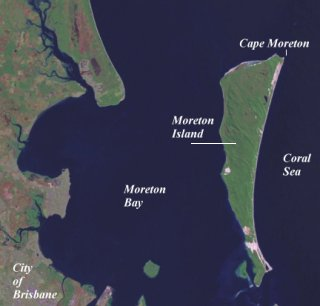
Moreton Bay, the division's namesake

The division was one of the original 65 divisions contested at the first federal election. It is named after Moreton Bay, and originally stretched from southern Brisbane all the way to the Gold Coast. While successive redistributions have left the seat completely landlocked, it has nonetheless retained the name of Moreton, mainly because the Australian Electoral Commission's guidelines on electoral redistributions require it to preserve the names of original electorates where possible.

The seat was in the hands of the Liberal Party and its predecessors from 1906 to 1990, though the Liberals' hold on the seat was usually tenuous from the 1950s onward. Labor regained it in 1990, and then until 2013 it was a bellwether seat held by the party of government. Labor narrowly retained the seat in 2013 even as it lost government, marking the first time in over a century that the non-Labor parties had been in government without holding Moreton.

The seat is known for having decided the 1961 federal election. The Liberals only won the seat by 130 votes to give the Coalition a bare one-seat majority; had 93 Communist preferences gone the other way, it would have resulted in a hung parliament.

On its current boundaries, the seat is very multicultural, with significant Asian, South Eastern European, Arab and African population in the southern part of the electorate particularly in the suburbs of Sunnybank, Acacia Ridge, Kuraby and Moorooka.

== Boundaries ==
Since 1984, federal electoral division boundaries in Australia have been determined at redistributions by a redistribution committee appointed by the Australian Electoral Commission. Redistributions occur for the boundaries of divisions in a particular state, and they occur every seven years, or sooner if a state's representation entitlement changes or when divisions of a state are malapportioned.

Moreton is located in south east Queensland, and is based in the southern suburbs of the City of Brisbane. The division includes Acacia Ridge, Archerfield, Chelmer, Fairfield, Graceville, Karawatha, Kuraby, MacGregor, Moorooka, Nathan, Oxley, Robertson, Rocklea, Runcorn, Salisbury, Stretton, Sunnybank, Sunnybank Hills, Tennyson, Yeronga, and Yeerongpilly, and parts of Algester, Berrinba, Calamvale, Coopers Plains, Corinda, Drewvale, Eight Mile Plains, Parkinson, Sherwood and Tarragindi.

== Members ==
Image	Member	Party	Term	Notes
	James Wilkinson (1854–1915)	Independent Labour	30 March 1901 – 1904	Previously held the Legislative Assembly of Queensland seat of Ipswich. Lost seat
	James Wilkinson (1854–1915)	Labour	1904 – 12 December 1906	Previously held the Legislative Assembly of Queensland seat of Ipswich. Lost seat
	Hugh Sinclair (1864–1926)	Anti-Socialist	12 December 1906 – 26 May 1909	Retired
	Hugh Sinclair (1864–1926)	Liberal	26 May 1909 – 17 February 1917	Retired
	Hugh Sinclair (1864–1926)	Nationalist	17 February 1917 – 3 November 1919	Retired
	Arnold Wienholt (1877–1940)	Nationalist	13 December 1919 – 6 November 1922	Previously held the Legislative Assembly of Queensland seat of Fassifern. Retired. Later elected to the Legislative Assembly of Queensland seat of Fassifern in 1930
	Josiah Francis (1890–1964)	Nationalist	16 December 1922 – 7 May 1931	Served as minister under Lyons and Menzies. Retired
	Josiah Francis (1890–1964)	United Australia	7 May 1931 – 21 February 1945	Served as minister under Lyons and Menzies. Retired
	Josiah Francis (1890–1964)	Liberal	21 February 1945 – 4 November 1955	Served as minister under Lyons and Menzies. Retired
	Sir James Killen (1925–2007)	Liberal	10 December 1955 – 15 August 1983	Served as minister under Gorton, McMahon and Fraser. Resigned to retire from politics
	Don Cameron (1940–)	Liberal	5 November 1983 – 24 March 1990	Previously held the Division of Fadden. Lost seat
	Garrie Gibson (1954-)	Labor	24 March 1990 – 2 March 1996	Lost seat
	Gary Hardgrave (1960–)	Liberal	2 March 1996 – 24 November 2007	Served as minister under Howard. Lost seat
	Graham Perrett (1966–)	Labor	24 November 2007 – 28 March 2025	Retired
	Julie-Ann Campbell (1986–)	Labor	3 May 2025 – present	Incumbent

== Election results ==
2025 Australian federal election: Moreton
Party	Candidate	Votes	%	±%
Labor	Julie-Ann Campbell	39,697	42.31	+4.89
Liberal National	Henry Swindon	24,132	25.72	−7.53
Greens	Remah Naji	20,332	21.67	+0.87
One Nation	Grant Spork	2,686	2.86	−0.77
Trumpet of Patriots	Christian Julius	2,328	2.48	+0.89
People First	Natarsha Billing	2,243	2.39	+2.39
Family First	Melinda Keller	1,682	1.79	+1.79
Citizens	Max Hooper	731	0.78	+0.78
Total formal votes		93,831	95.68	−1.56
Informal votes		4,232	4.32	+1.56
Turnout		98,063	89.75	+0.89
Two-party-preferred result
Labor	Julie-Ann Campbell	62,014	66.09	+7.00
Liberal National	Henry Swindon	31,817	33.91	−7.00
Labor hold		Swing	+7.00	
