= Woodridge, Queensland =

Woodridge
- Town
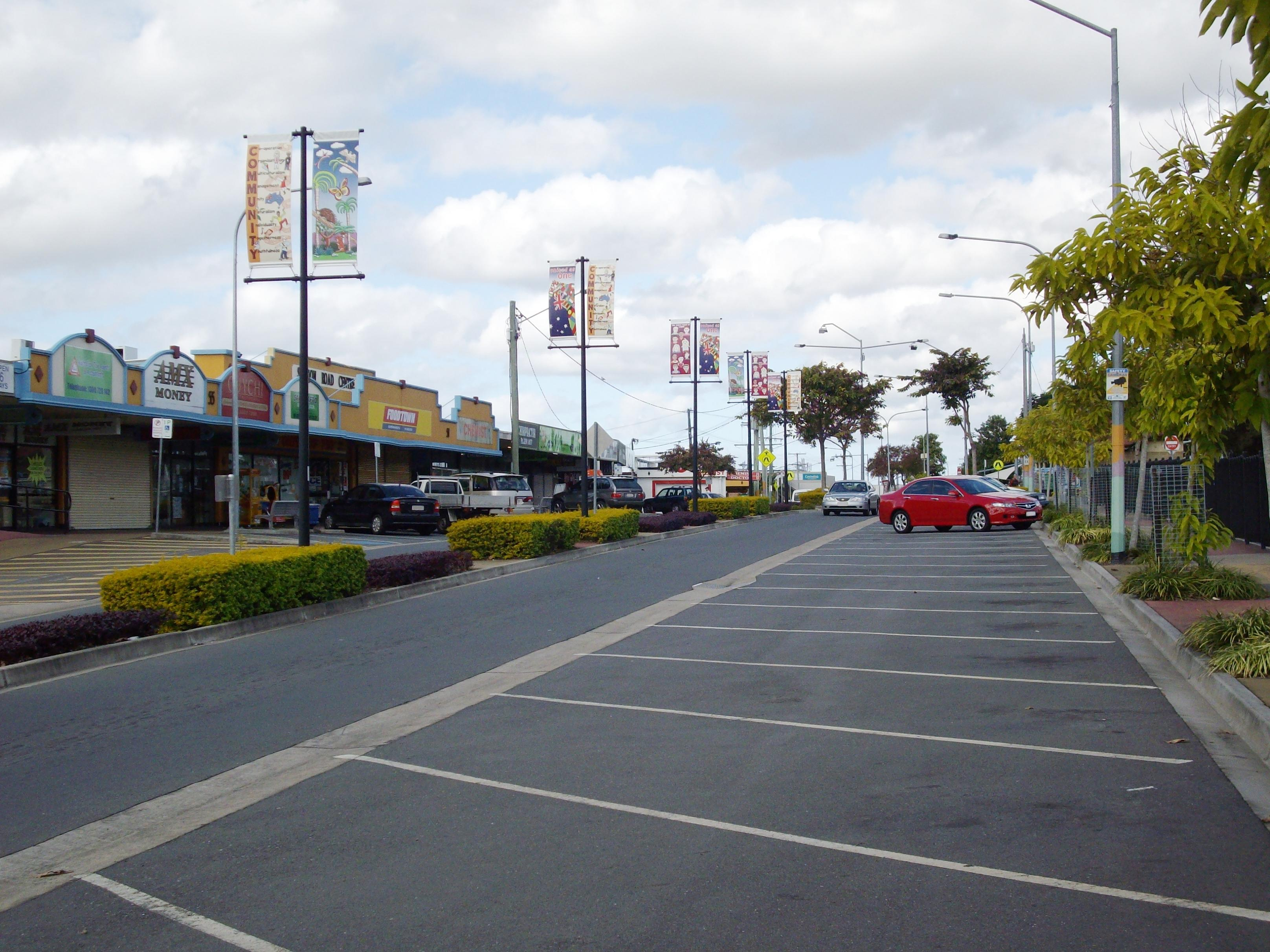
- Station Road, Woodridge

- Interactive map of Woodridge
- Coordinates: 27.6316°S 153.1094°E
- Country: Australia
- State: Queensland
- City: Logan City
- LGA: Logan City
- Location: 1.3 km (0.81 mi) N of Logan Central; 22.2 km (13.8 mi) S of Brisbane CBD; 57.1 km (35.5 mi) NNW of Surfers Paradise

Government
  - State electorate: Woodridge
  - Federal division: Rankin

Area
  - Total: 4.7 km^{2} (1.8 sq mi)

Population
  - Total: 12,982 (2021 census)
  - Density: 2,762/km^{2} (7,150/sq mi)
- Time zone: UTC+10:00 (AEST)
- Postcode: 4114
Localities around Woodridge
Kuraby	Underwood	Underwood
Karawatha	Woodridge	Slacks Creek
Karawatha	Logan Central	Slacks Creek

Woodridge is a town and suburb in the City of Logan, Queensland, Australia. In the 2021 census, the suburb of Woodridge had a population of 12,982 people.

== Geography ==
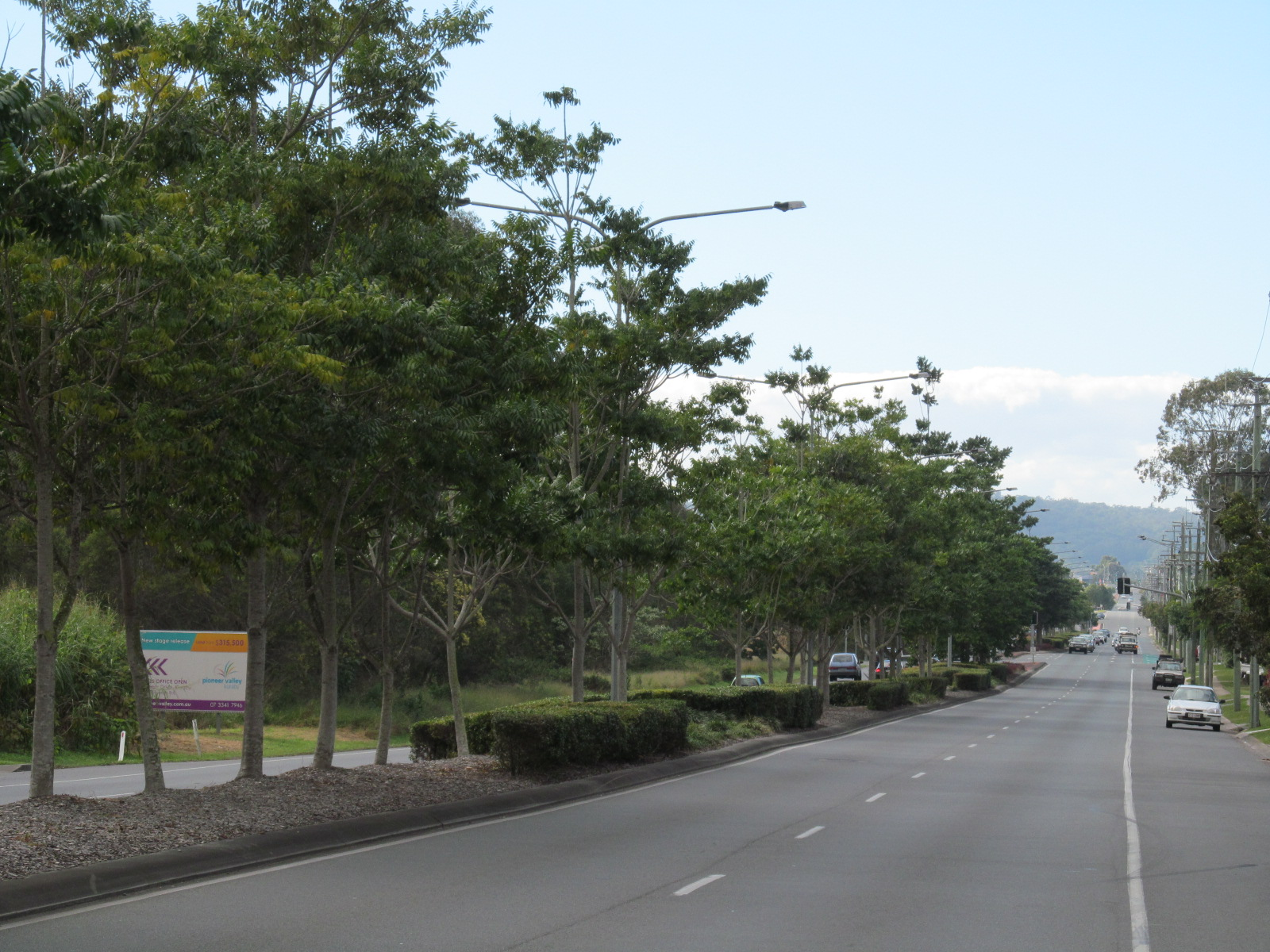
Compton Road, 2014

The suburb is immediately north of Logan Central and is 20 km south-east of central Brisbane.

Booran is a neighbourhood with the suburb (27.6279°S 153.1018°E). It was the site of the historic town of Booran, which was bounded by the (then) South Coast railway line (now the Gold Coast railway line) to the west, Victoria Street to the north, North Street to the east and Bruce Street to the south.

== History ==
In 1888, a town of Booran was surveyed following the construction of the South Coast railway line. The name Booran comes from the Yugarabul language group word 'buran' (or 'booran') meaning 'wind' (or 'wind from the south'). On 7 March 1889 the Queensland Government auctioned 30 building allotments in the new town. There were more land sales in Booran in December 1889.

After timber getter Dugald Graham was given permission to erect a siding, the township became known as Graham's Siding in 1913.

The name Woodridge is derived from an informal name given to a property owned by Octavius Stubbs. When the Queensland Railways Department opened a platform to the public in early 1917 they selected Woodridge for the station name and later that year the name was recognised by the post office.

In the early 1870's, Woodridge was home to a major timber reserve.

Like a number of other Logan City suburbs Woodridge was once part of the Shire of Tingalpa.

Woodridge Provisional School opened on 20 May 1924 with 21 students and Miss Dorothy Tuke as the first teacher. In 1932 it relocated to the current site and became Woodridge State School. This school is now within the suburb of Logan Central.

St James' Anglican Church opened circa 1954 at 1 Charles Avenue (27.6385°S 153.1034°E). It closed on 1 March 2002.

St Paul's Catholic School opened in January 1969.

Woodridge North State School opened on 28 January 1969.

Woodridge Opportunity School opened on 1 January 1972 and was renamed Logan City Special School circa 1997. This school is now within the suburb of .Logan Central.

Woodridge State High School opened on 1 February 1972. This school is now within the suburb of .Logan Central.

Harris Fields State School opened on 1 January 1975.

In 1985, the suburb of Logan Central was created, consisted only of the "Logan City Council Administration Centre and contiguous Council properties", but it was subsequently enlarged with land taken away from both Woodridge and Kingston.

In 2021, it was announced that homes in Woodridge would be demolished for the Gold Coast Logan Faster Rail project. The project includes increasing the rail corridor from two to four tracks and straightening a section in preparation for the 2032 Olympic Games.

== Demographics ==
In the 2011 census, the suburb of Woodridge had a population of 12,787, 50.5% female and 49.5% male. The median age of the Woodridge population was 30 years, 7 years below the Australian median. 54% of people living in Woodridge were born in Australia. The other top responses for country of birth were New Zealand 9.1%, England 2.6%, Samoa 2.1%, Burma 1.6%, India 1.5%. 62.8% of people spoke only English at home; the next most common languages were 4.3% Samoan, 1.7% Arabic, 1.2% Hindi, 1.1% Karen, 1.1% Tongan.

In the 2016 census, the suburb of Woodridge had a population of 12,579 people, 49.5% female and 50.5% male. The median age of the Woodridge population was 32 years, 6 years below the national median of 38. 49.2% of people living in Woodridge were born in Australia. The other top responses for country of birth were New Zealand 7.2%, Myanmar 3.5%, Afghanistan 3.0%, India 2.1% and Samoa 1.9%. 55.0% of people spoke only English at home; the next most common languages were 3.8% Samoan, 2.9% Arabic, 2.4% Hazaraghi, 1.4% Dari and 1.4% Burmese and Related Languages, nec.

In the 2021 census, the suburb of Woodridge had a population of 12,982 people, 49.5% female and 50.5% male. The median age of the Woodridge population was 33 years, 5 years below the national median of 38. 49.9% of people living in Woodridge were born in Australia. The other top responses for country of birth were New Zealand 6.9%, Myanmar 3.9%, Afghanistan 2.2%, England 1.7%, and Samoa 1.7%. 54.2% of people spoke only English at home; the next most common languages were 3.0% Samoan, 2.3% Hazaraghi, 1.8% Arabic, 1.7% Zomi, and 1.6% Urdu.

== Education ==
Woodridge North State School is a government primary (Prep–6) school for boys and girls at Arthur Street (27.6264°S 153.1062°E). In 2018, the school had an enrolment of 538 students with 42 teachers (39 full-time equivalent) and 31 non-teaching staff (20 full-time equivalent). It includes a special education program.

Harris Fields State School is a government primary (Prep–6) school for boys and girls at Oct-38 Smith Road (27.6299°S 153.1156°E). In 2018, the school had an enrolment of 543 students with 40 teachers (36 full-time equivalent) and 29 non-teaching staff (20 full-time equivalent). It includes a special education program.

St Paul's School is a Catholic primary (Prep–6) school for boys and girls at 3 St Paul's Drive (27.6356°S 153.1107°E). In 2018, the school had an enrolment of 310 students with 32 teachers (26 full-time equivalent) and 28 non-teaching staff (14 full-time equivalent).

Due to changes in suburb boundaries, Woodridge State School, Logan City Special School and Woodridge State High School are now within the neighbouring suburb of Logan Central to the south.

There are no secondary schools in Woodridge. The nearest government secondary schools are Woodridge State High School in neighbouring Logan Central to the south and Mabel Park State High School in neighbouring Slacks Creek to the south-east.

== Amenities ==
Woodridge Scout Group is at 18–20 Elizabeth Street (27.63229°S 153.09594°E).

Woodridge Skate Bowl is at Woodridge Adventure Park at 173–193 Kingston Road (27.6320°S 153.1181°E).

There are a number of parks in the suburb:

- Acacia Forest Park (27.6242°S 153.0961°E)
- Booran Park (27.6229°S 153.1135°E)
- Elkhorn Street Park (27.6345°S 153.1003°E)
- Ewing Park (27.6333°S 153.1119°E)
- Fairdale Street Park (27.6225°S 153.1075°E)
- Jean Park (27.6359°S 153.1125°E)
- Karawatha Forest Park (27.6359°S 153.0828°E)
- Morgan Park (27.6381°S 153.1018°E)
- Oates Park with a skateboard bowl (27.6354°S 153.0970°E)
- Rainbow Park (27.6362°S 153.1084°E)
- Wagawn Park (27.6353°S 153.1143°E)
- Willow Park (27.6236°S 153.1059°E)

== Facilities ==
There are a number of emergency services in the suburb:

- Logan Central SES Facility (27.6384°S 153.1020°E)
- Woodridge Fire Station (27.6268°S 153.1168°E)
- Woodridge Ambulance Station (27.6315°S 153.1100°E)

== Transport ==
The Woodridge railway station is part of the Queensland Rail City network and located within the connecting Logan Central business district. It is in Zone 2 of the Translink integrated public transport system. Trinder Park railway station also provides access to regular Queensland Rail City network services to Brisbane and Beenleigh.
