= Daisy Hill, Queensland =

Daisy Hill
- Suburb
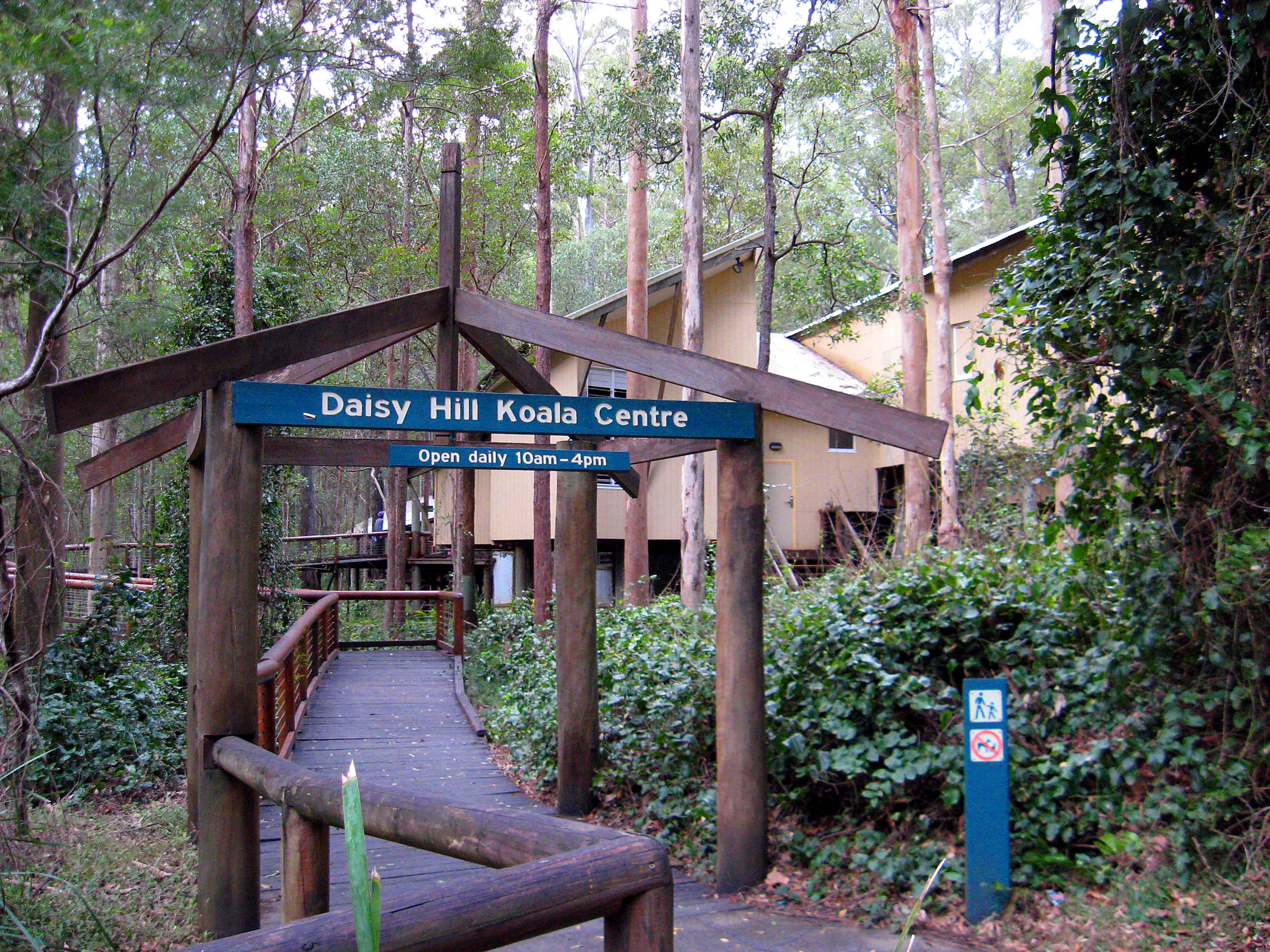
- Daisy Hill Koala Centre, 2013

- Interactive map of Daisy Hill
- Coordinates: 27.6286°S 153.1602°E
- Country: Australia
- State: Queensland
- City: Logan City
- LGA: Logan City
- Location: 5.6 km (3.5 mi) E of Logan Central; 24.9 km (15.5 mi) SSE of Brisbane CBD

Government
  - State electorate: Springwood
  - Federal division: Rankin

Area
  - Total: 9.0 km^{2} (3.5 sq mi)

Population
  - Total: 6,925 (2021 census)
  - Density: 769/km^{2} (1,993/sq mi)
- Time zone: UTC+10:00 (AEST)
- Postcode: 4127
Suburbs around Daisy Hill
Priestdale	Priestdale	Priestdale
Springwood	Daisy Hill	Mount Cotton
Slacks Creek	Slacks Creek	Shailer Park

Daisy Hill is a suburb in the City of Logan, Queensland, Australia. In the 2021 census, Daisy Hill had a population of 6,925 people.

== Geography ==
Located 4 km east of Logan central and 22 km south-east of central Brisbane. The suburb's southern boundary is the Pacific Motorway, A large proportion of Daisy Hill is protected by the Daisy Hill Conservation Park.

== History ==
The Dennis family were first Europeans to settle at Daisy Hill. James Dennis immigrated in 1864 on the ship Flying Cloud. In 1867, he married Mary Ann Markwell. Around 1870 they began selecting land in the now Daisy Hill area, eventually acquiring over 320 hectares (800 acres). They named the property Daisy Hill, because their daughters saw Olearia nernstii growing in proliferation on the hill.

Slacks Creek Provisional School opened on 19 May 1873 in the original Wesleyan Church located on Markwell property on Loganlea Road. In July 1879 it relocated to a new site on Loganlea Road. Due to flooding at that site, it was moved in 1893 to Logan Road near the intersection with Daisy Hill Road. On 1 January 1909 it became Slacks Creek State School. In 1964, due to the increasingly heavy traffic on Logan Road, the school was relocated to its current site. On 14 October 2016 it was renamed Daisy Hill State School as changes to the suburban boundaries had resulted in the school no longer being within Slacks Creek but was within Daisy Hill.

The Daisy Hill State Forest was declared a timber reserve in 1874. In 1917 it was declared a State Forest and in 1986 a State Forest Park. The forest was used for timber gathering, honey making, gold mining and grazing. In 2006, it was gazetted as Daisy Hill Conservation Park to be used for habitat conservation and recreation; it contains the Daisy Hill Koala Centre which was opened in May 1995. In June 2017, the Queensland State Government allocated Daisy Hill Koala Centre $3.3 million to upgrade the premises, in the lead up to the 2018 Gold Coast Commonwealth Games.

A Reserve for Rifle Range was gazetted in 1901 from part of the west side of the original timber reserve. It was proposed for use by the Forest Rangers Rifle Club of Slacks Creek with a recommendation from the Queensland Defence Force. Initially the range consisted of 10 ha (25 acres), 1,010 by 100 metres (1,100 by 110 yards), with the line of fire terminated by a natural rise. The range was re-gazetted as reserve R.799 in 1902 with an increase in area towards and behind the targets for safety, forming a total area of around 50 ha (123 acres). In 1908, the military officer supervising rifle clubs in Queensland reported that the range was not then in use due to destruction of mantlets and targets by bush fire. The land was reinstated as part of the State Forest in 1952.

Other early pioneers were the Usher family, who grew grapes and made and sold wine.

Daisy Hill was once part of the Shire of Tingalpa.

The first Catholic Church of St Edward the Confessor was opened circa May 1978. It burned down on 11 January 1988. On 26 August 1988, the new Catholic Church of St Edward the Confessor was officially opened by Archbishop Francis Rush.

St Edward the Confessor Catholic School opened in 1978.

John Paul College opened on 26 January 1982.

== Demographics ==
In the 2011 census, Daisy Hill had a population of 6,255 people, 49.7% female and 50.3% male. The median age of the Daisy Hill population was 35 years, 2 years below the national median of 37. 65.5% of people living in Daisy Hill were born in Australia. The other top responses for country of birth were New Zealand 7.7%, England 6%, South Africa 1.5%, Scotland 1.1%, Republic of Korea 1.1%. 84.5% of people spoke only English at home; the next most common language was 1.1% Korean.

In the 2016 census, Daisy Hill had a population of 6,660 people, 49.6% female and 50.4% male. The median age of the Daisy Hill population was 36, 2 years below the national median of 38. 64.8% of people living in Daisy Hill were born in Australia. The other top responses were New Zealand 6.5%, England 5.4%, China 1.5%, India 1.4%, Republic of Korea 1.3%. 79.0% of people only spoke English at home; the next most common language was Mandarin at 2.0%.

In the 2021 census, Daisy Hill had a population of 6,925 people, 48.9% female and 51.1% male. The median age of the Daisy Hill population was 38, on par with the national median of 38. 64.1% of people living in Daisy Hill were born in Australia. The other top responses for country of birth were New Zealand 6.1%, England 5.0%, India 2.1%, China 1.9%, Republic of Korea 1.6%. 76.3% of people only spoke English at home; the next most common language was Mandarin at 2.4%.

== Heritage listings ==
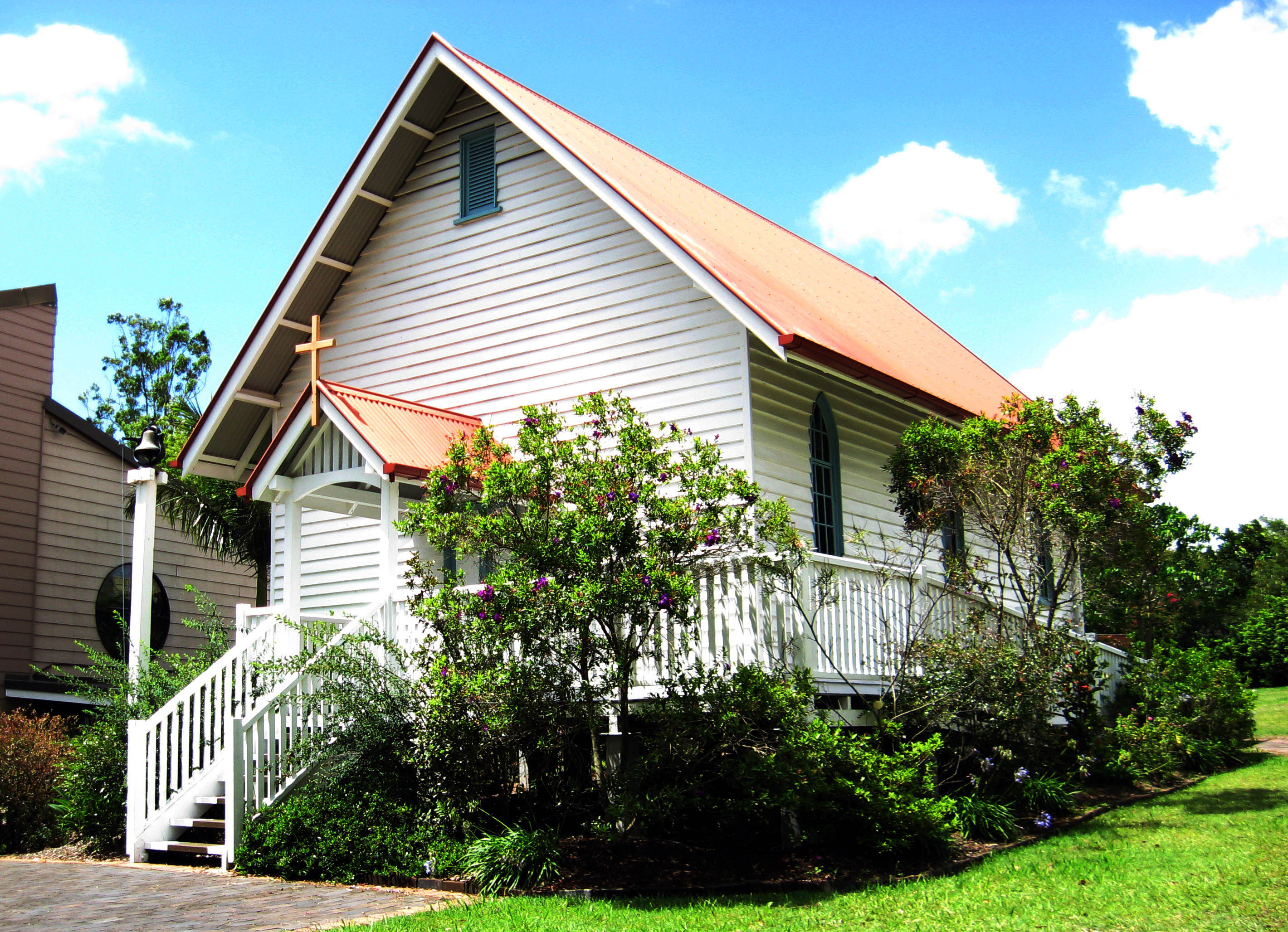
Old St Mark's Anglican Church

Daisy Hill has a number of heritage-listed sites, including:

- Old St Mark's Anglican Church, 2 Boronia Drive

== Education ==
Daisy Hill State School is a government primary (Prep–6) school for boys and girls at 20–50 Daisy Hill Road (27.6432°S 153.1534°E). In 2018, the school had an enrolment of 271 students with 22 teachers (17 full-time equivalent) and 22 non-teaching staff (11 full-time equivalent). It includes a special education program.

St Edward the Confessor School is a Catholic primary (Prep–6) school for boys and girls at 104 Chatswood Road (27.6348°S 153.1469°E). In 2018, the school had an enrolment of 547 students with 35 teachers (30 full-time equivalent) and 21 non-teaching staff (13 full-time equivalent).

John Paul College is a private primary and secondary (Prep–12) school for boys and girls at John Paul Drive (27.6336°S 153.1484°E). In 2018, the school had an enrolment of 1,712 students with 157 teachers (141 full-time equivalent) and 113 non-teaching staff (92 full-time equivalent).

There are no government secondary schools in Daisy Hill. The nearest government secondary schools are Mabel Park State High School in neighbouring Slacks Creek to the south-west and Springwood State High School in neighbouring Springwood to the west.

== Amenities ==
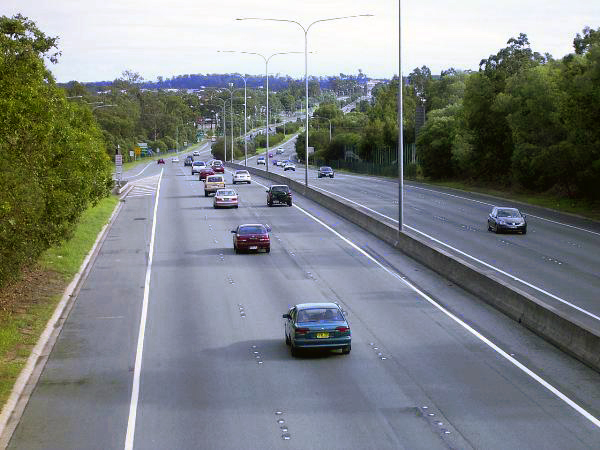
Pacific Motorway at Daisy Hill, 2007

Daisy Hill State Forest is considered to be one of the best mountain bike riding areas in Australia.

St Mark's Anglican Church is at 41A Winnetts Road (27.6438°S 153.1488°E).

The Catholic Church of St Edward the Confessor is at 104 Chatswood Road (27.6345°S 153.1469°E).
