= Old St Mark's Anglican Church, Slacks Creek =

Old St Mark's Anglican Church
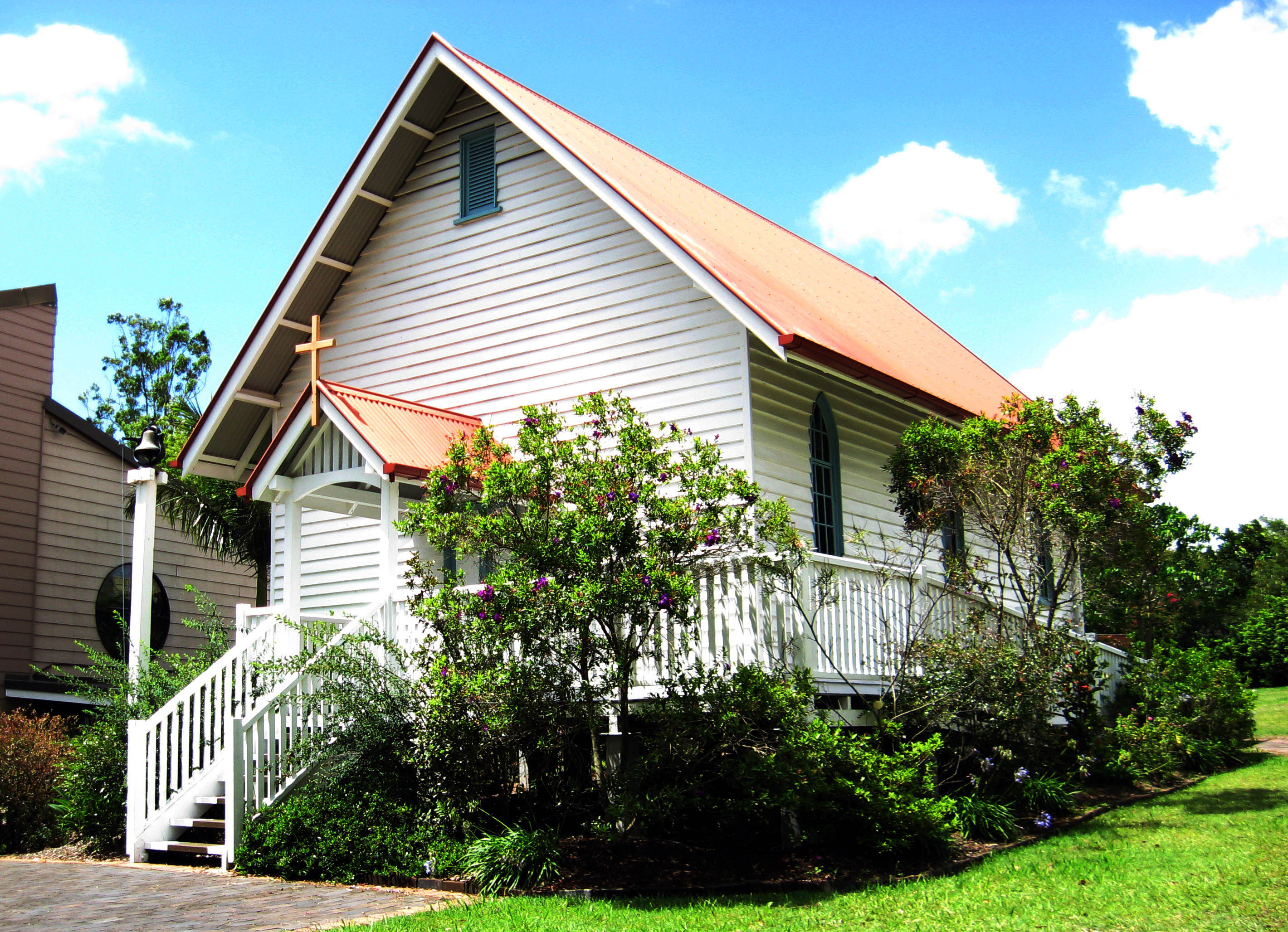
- Old St Mark's Anglican Church, 2010

- Location within Queensland Location within Australia
- 27.6439°S 153.1488°E
- Location: 2 Boronia Drive and 41A Winnetts Road, Daisy Hill, City of Logan, Queensland, Australia

History
- Design period: Early 20th century
- Built: 1901

Site notes
- Architectural style: Gothic

Queensland Heritage Register
- Official name: Old St Mark's Anglican Church, St Mark's Anglican Church
- Type: state heritage (landscape, built)
- Designated: 30 March 2001
- Reference no.: 602201
- Significant period: 1880s–1900s (historical) ongoing (social)
- Significant components: headstone, grave surrounds/railings, grave marker, cemetery, church, views to
- Builders: W Anthony

Old St Mark's Anglican Church is a heritage-listed former church and current church hall at 2 Boronia Drive and 41A Winnetts Road, Daisy Hill, City of Logan, Queensland, Australia. It was built in 1901 by W Anthony. It was known as St Mark's Anglican Church. It was added to the Queensland Heritage Register on 30 March 2001.

== History ==
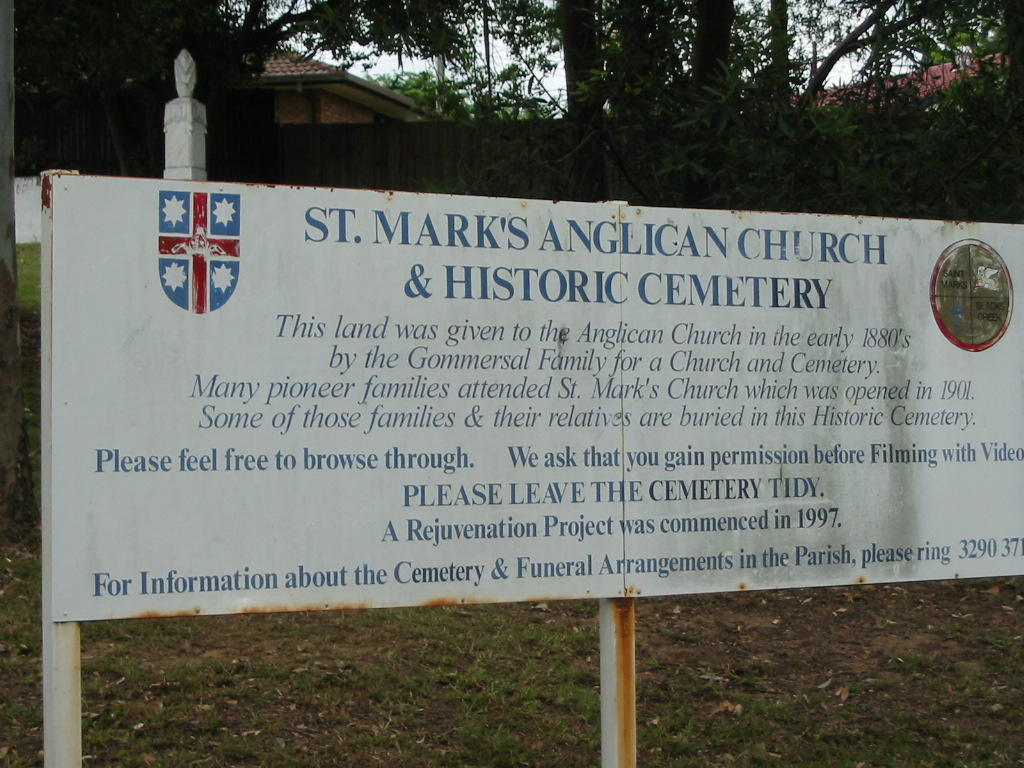
Information board, 2006

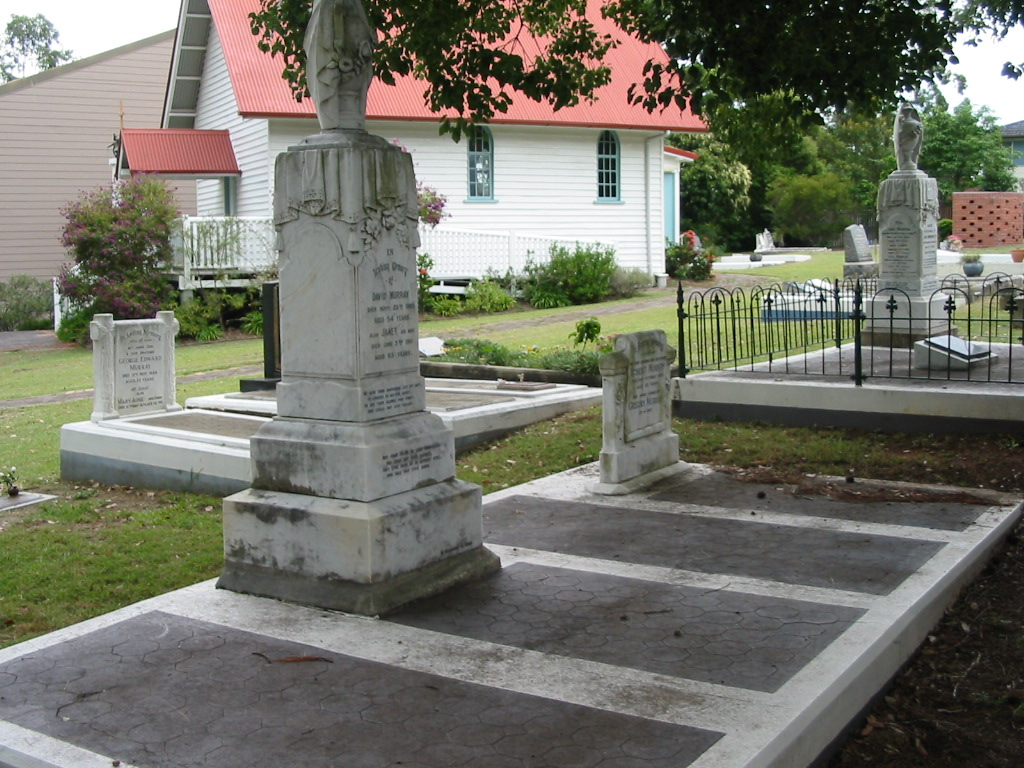
Cemetery with Old St Mark's Anglican Church in the background, 2006

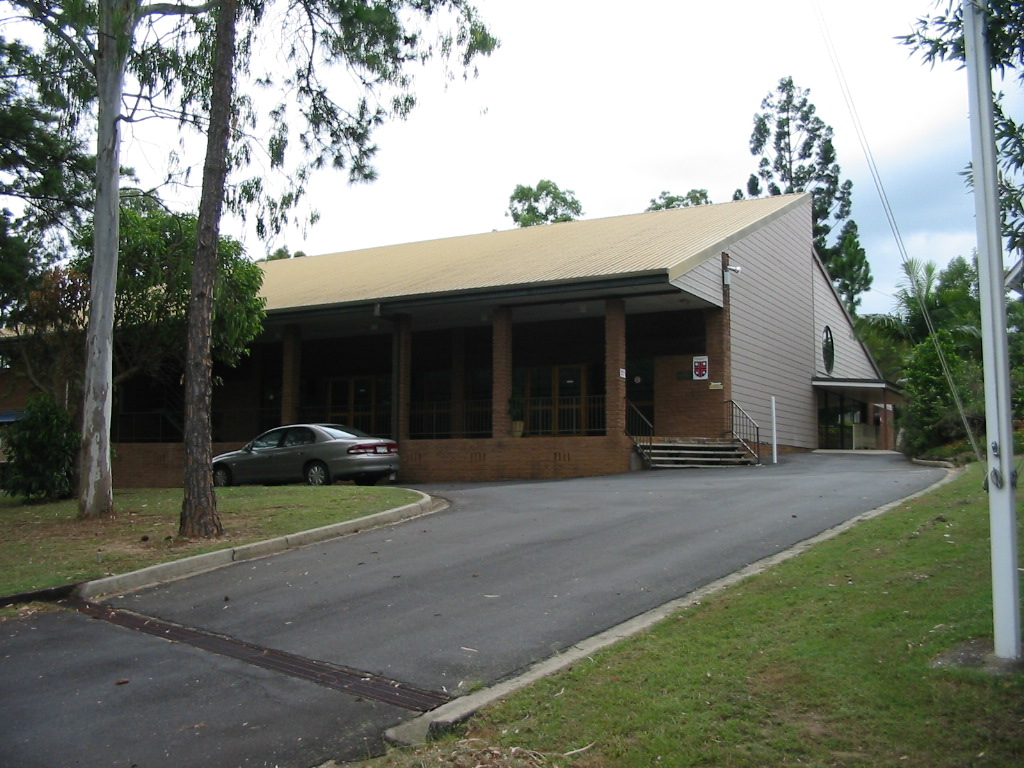
The present day St Mark's Anglican Church, 2006

The Winnetts Road property on which St Mark's Anglican church is sited was donated in 1880 by the Gommersall family for use as a community burial ground. Mrs and Mrs Gommersall were the first to be buried in the cemetery and their graves are dated 1883.

On Friday 9 March 1900, a committee formed by local families met in the local school building to plan for the building of a church in Slacks Creek and it was agreed to build the church within the site originally set aside for burials. At its meeting on 10 September 1900, the committee decided to call tenders for a church of plain weatherboard, 20 by 20 feet (6.1 by 6.1 m), also a porch to same, 6 by 6 feet (1.8 by 1.8 m) which was to accommodate 24 worshippers.

Only one tender for a church at Slacks Creek was submitted, and builder W Anthony's price of eight-five pounds and ten shillings was accepted in January 1901.

The church of St Mark was dedicated on 21 April 1901 by Bishop William Webber. Later additions to the original building include a vestry added at the north-eastern end and the lining of the ceiling and walls internal walls.

Surrounding the church, the cemetery contains the graves of several of the original parish council members who were instrumental in the planning and construction of old St Mark's. The 1901 parish council included Thomas White, Thomas Usher, Robert Gommersall, Frederick Armstrong and William Winnett. The Winnett family graves are located near the rear of the church. There are also other well known local families and settlers in the cemetery such as the Ushers, Murrays, Morrows and Shailers.

In 1977 when St Marks, Slacks Creek was formed as a separate parish the rectory was built at No 4 Boronia Avenue. By 1978 the church could no longer accommodate the growth in population and from that time services were held in the rectory garage until the second church was built adjacent to the original church. The 1901 church was converted for use as a hall by the parish and the community. To celebrate the church's centenary in conjunction with the Centenary of Federation celebrations, the church was recommissioned on 30 March 2001. As part of this celebration, the church was restored, its early furniture and fittings returned and disabled access provided.

== Description ==
St Mark's Anglican Church is located on a south-west facing slope on 6,212 square metres (66,870 sq ft) overlooking Winnetts Road at Slacks Creek. Located in the grounds of an earlier cemetery, the church is a simple timber building with a steeply pitched painted roof of corrugated iron. It is lowset on concrete stumps and is clad with painted weatherboards. The gabled roof porch at its south-western end has a valance of simple detailing, the vestry is attached at the north-eastern end of the building and has a skillion roof. The roof space is ventilated with timber louvred vents at each end.

The original porch roof that extended over a narrow landing and stairs survives but the flooring has been replaced. The recently constructed landing and disabled access ramp replace a later set of stairs and landing.

The walls of the interior of the nave are lined vertically with silky oak v-jointed tongue and groove boards and the boards to the ceiling are laid along its length. From the wall the ceiling follows the line of the rafters, then the pitch is reduced up to a central section of flat ceiling. A pair of iron tie rods provide structural stability.

All of the joinery is of silky oak and includes a belt rail, pair of doors and six lancet shaped windows, three to each side wall with a nine pane central pivoting sash beneath a fixed sash of six. panes. The whole of the interior of the nave is unpainted and is clear finished. The vestry is unlined and unpainted.

Whilst the church is orientated so that it faces the road, the graves within the cemetery are orientated east west with headstones facing east up the hill and away from the church. There are 32 marked graves and 20 unmarked graves with 2 reserved and 15 vacant plots.

== Heritage listing ==
Old St Mark's Anglican Church was listed on the Queensland Heritage Register on 30 March 2001 having satisfied the following criteria.

The place is important in demonstrating the evolution or pattern of Queensland's history.

St Mark's Anglican Church and its cemetery, an early community burial ground donated by a local resident, is a strong focus of the community of Logan City and provides evidence of the efforts of the early pioneers within the locality and the development of the Anglican Church within it.

The place demonstrates rare, uncommon or endangered aspects of Queensland's cultural heritage.

The siting of St Mark's church within a graveyard is of particular interest as it provides evidence of an uncommon aspect of our cultural heritage. This practice has a long history and is one which has been largely discontinued. The collection of memorials and gravestones in the graveyard at St Mark's Anglican Church records unique documentary information that is of interest to historians, genealogists and relatives of the deceased providing evidence of early settlers and those closely associated with the founding of the church in the local area.

Through its unpainted interior linings and its retention of early fixtures and fittings, St Mark's Anglican Church also demonstrates an uncommon example of an intact interior in a timber church.

The place has a strong or special association with a particular community or cultural group for social, cultural or spiritual reasons.

St Mark's Anglican Church and its cemetery, an early community burial ground donated by a local resident, is a strong focus of the community of Logan City and provides evidence of the efforts of the early pioneers within the locality and the development of the Anglican Church within it.
