= Drewvale =

- Suburb
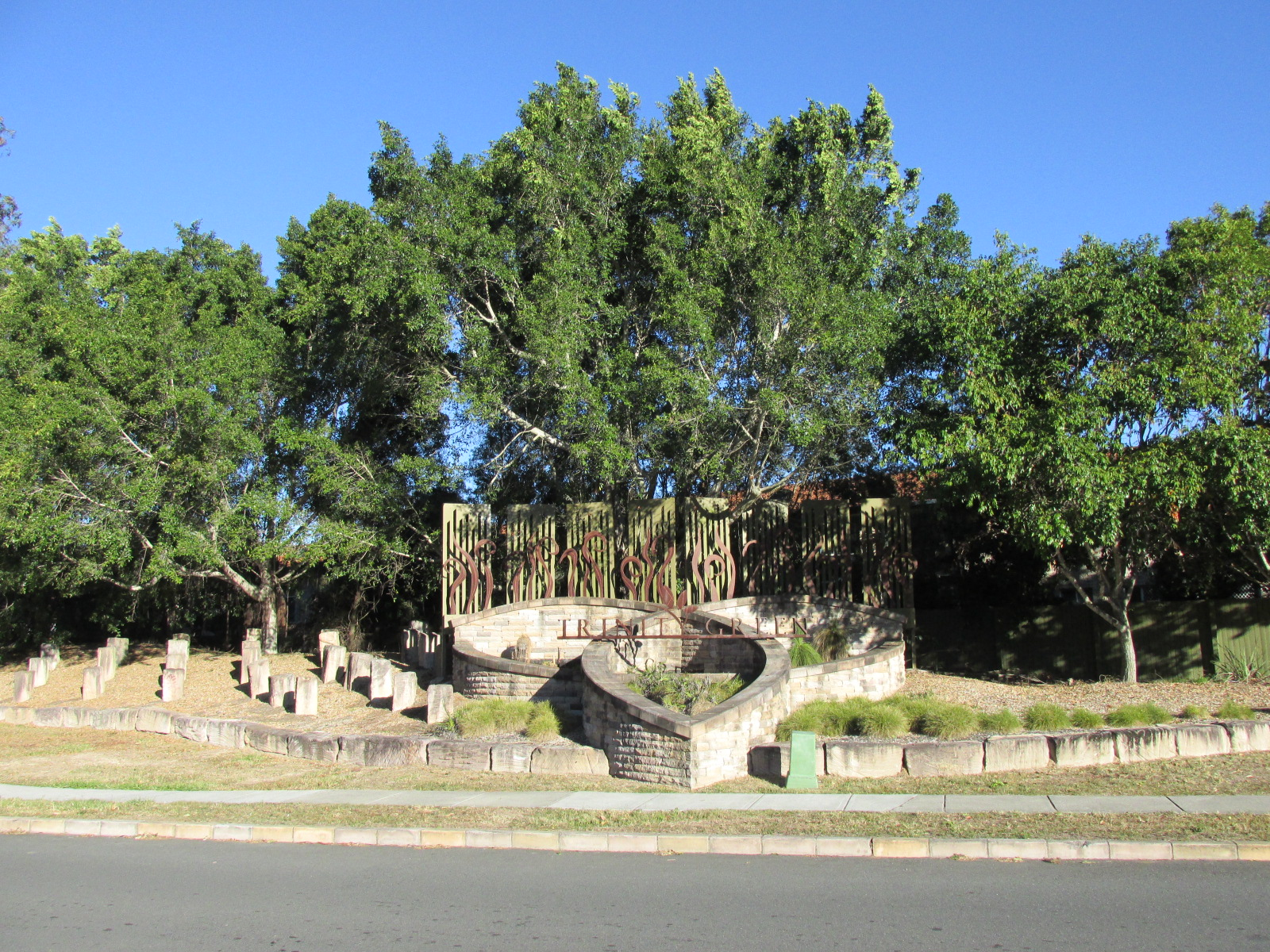
- Entrance to the Trinity Green housing estate, 2014

- Interactive map of Drewvale
- Coordinates: 27.6486°S 153.0547°E
- Country: Australia
- State: Queensland
- City: Brisbane
- LGA: City of Brisbane (Calamvale Ward)
- Location: 26.5 km (16.5 mi) S of Brisbane CBD

Government
  - State electorate: Stretton
  - Federal division: Rankin

Area
  - Total: 4.4 km^{2} (1.7 sq mi)

Population
  - Total: 4,779 (2021 census)
  - Density: 1,086/km^{2} (2,810/sq mi)
- Time zone: UTC+10:00 (AEST)
- Postcode: 4116
Suburbs around Drewvale
Calamvale	Stretton	Karawatha
Parkinson	Drewvale	Berrinba
Parkinson	Browns Plains	Browns Plains

Drewvale is an outer suburb of the City of Brisbane, Queensland, Australia. In the 2021 census, Drewvale had a population of 4,779 people.

== Geography ==
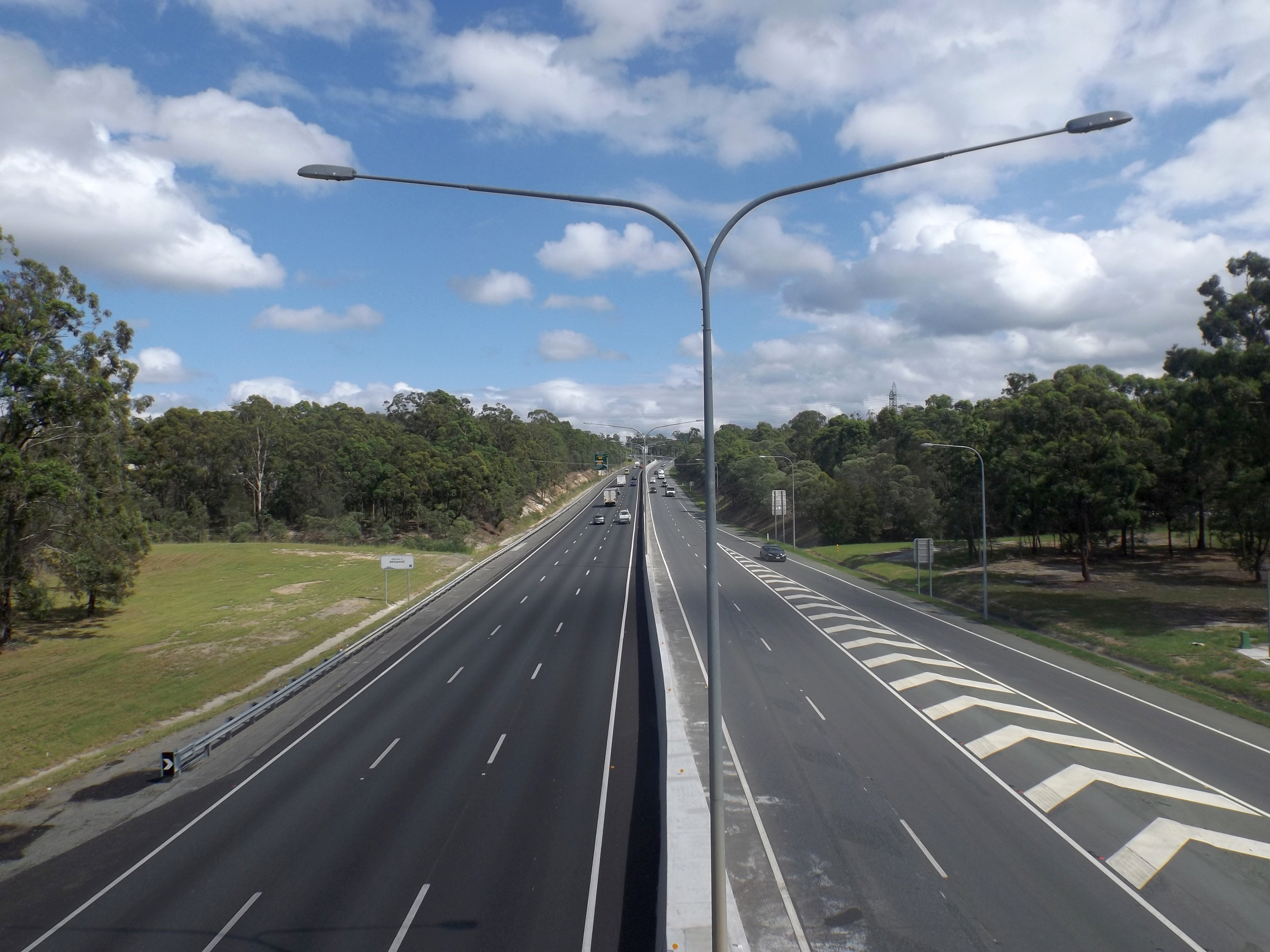
A small section of the suburb extends to Wembley Road.

Drewvale is 26.1 kilometres (16 mi) south of the Brisbane CBD and borders with Logan City. Drewvale is located at the interchange of the Gateway Motorway and the Logan Motorway. It is the fourth most southern suburb of Brisbane, after Parkinson, Larapinta and Heathwood. However, Drewvale contains the southernmost residential properties in Brisbane, as the southern extents of Parkinson, Heathwood and Larapinta contain only industrial and commercial development.

== History ==
The area was farmed by the Drew family from the 1870s. The locality was unofficially known as Drewvale for nearly a century, but was officially named Drewvale by the Queensland Place Names Board on 1 November 1971.

== Demographics ==
Historical population
Year	Pop.	±%
2006	2,580	—
2011	3,943	+52.8%
2016	4,476	+13.5%
2021	4,779	+6.8%

In the 2016 census, Drewvale had a population of 4,476 people.

In the 2021 census, Drewvale had a population of 4,779 people, 51.5% female and 48.5% male. The median age of the Drewvale population was 35 years of age, 3 years below the Australian median of 38. 49.2% of people living in Drewvale were born in Australia, compared to the national average of 66.9%; the next most common countries of birth were India 9.7%, New Zealand 6.4%, China 6.3%, England 2.1%, South Korea 1.9%. 47.0% of people spoke only English at home; the next most popular languages were 10.2% Mandarin, 5.0% Malayalam, 4.2% Punjabi, 3.3% Cantonese, 3.1% Hindi.

== Education ==
There are no schools in Drewvale. The nearest government primary and secondary school is the Stretton State College in neighbouring Stretton. The closest higher education institution is Griffith University located in Meadowbrook.
