= Berrinba, Queensland =

Berrinba
- Suburb
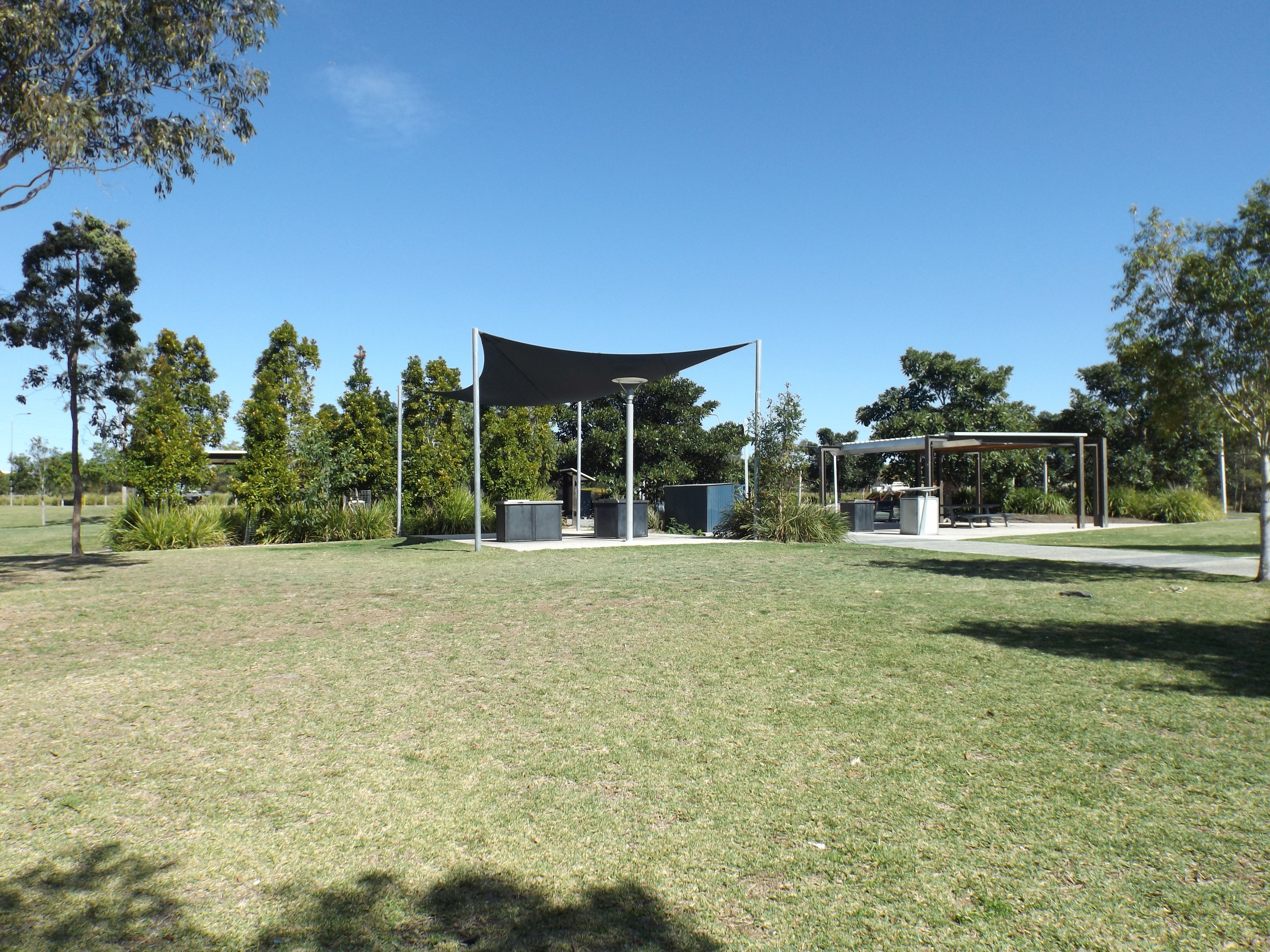
- Berrinba Wetlands picnic area, 2014

- Interactive map of Berrinba
- Coordinates: 27.6588°S 153.0761°E
- Country: Australia
- State: Queensland
- City: Logan City
- LGA: Logan City
- Location: 5.4 km (3.4 mi) SW of Logan Central; 28.5 km (17.7 mi) S of Brisbane CBD
- Established: 1971

Government
  - State electorate: Woodridge
  - Federal division: Rankin

Area
  - Total: 5.9 km^{2} (2.3 sq mi)

Population
  - Total: 2,615 (2021 census)
  - Density: 443/km^{2} (1,148/sq mi)
- Time zone: UTC+10:00 (AEST)
- Postcode: 4117
Suburbs around Berrinba
Drewvale	Karawatha	Logan Central
Browns Plains	Berrinba	Kingston
Heritage Park	Crestmead	Marsden

Berrinba is a northern mixed-use suburb in Logan City, Queensland, Australia. In the 2021 census, Berrinba had a population of 2,615 people.

== Geography ==
Berrinba is bounded to the north by Wembley Road and to the south by Browns Plain Road.

The Logan Motorway enters the locality from the north-west (Drewvale) and exits to the east (Kingston).

The land to the north of the motorway is occupied by industrial parks, while the land to the immediate south is residential. The land in the south of the locality is also occupied by industrial parks.

The land in the west of the locality is currently unused, but it is reserved for the Park Ridge Connector, a proposed road to run through this area, linking the Logan Motorway to Park Ridge, Flagstone and Yarrabilba.

== History ==
Berrinba was named as a suburb within the City of Brisbane on 1 November 1971 by the Queensland Place Names Board. The name Berrinba is an Aboriginal word meaning towards the south.

Berrinba East State School opened on 24 January 1977.

In 1979, Logan City Council and Brisbane City Council agreed to transfer Berrinba to Logan City in 1979, but it was not implemented until January 1997.

Logan Central Multicultural Uniting Church opened in 1990.

== Demographics ==
In the 2011 census, Berrinba had a population of 1,382 people. The population was 51.7% female and 48.3% male. The median age of the Berrinba population was 30 years of age, 7 years below the Australian median. 59.6% of people living in Berrinba were born in Australia, compared to the national average of 69.8%; the next most common countries of birth were New Zealand 6.5%, England 2.7%, India 2%, South Africa 1.8%, Fiji 1.7%. 67.5% of people spoke only English at home; the next most popular languages were 3% Mandarin, 2.2% Cantonese, 2.2% Hindi, 2.2% Arabic, 2.2% Samoan.

In the 2016 census, Berrinba had a population of 1,345 people.

In the 2021 census, the population had grown to 2,615 (50.6% female and 49.4% male), with a median age of 27, 11 years below the Australian median of 38. 52.3% of people living in Berrinba were born in Australia, compared to the national average of 66.9%; the next most common countries of birth were New Zealand 10.6%, India 3.9%, Afghanistan 3.0%, Fiji 2.3% and the Philippines 2.1%. 52.9% of people spoke only English at home; the next most popular languages were 4.1% Punjabi, 4.0% Arabic, 2.6% both Hindi and Samoan and 2.3% Hazaraghi. 27.8% of people did not have a religious affiliation. Most common religions were Islam (19.7%), Catholic (13.8%) and Christian not further defined (4.4%)

== Education ==
Berrinba East State School is a government primary (Prep-6) school for boys and girls at 165 Bardon Road (27.6521°S 153.0977°E). In 2018, the school had an enrolment of 456 students with 35 teachers (33 full-time equivalent) and 21 non-teaching staff (15 full-time equivalent). It includes a special education program.

There are no secondary schools in Berrinba. The nearest government secondary school is Woodridge State High School in neighbouring Logan Central to the north-east.

In October 2020, approval was given to Al-Madinah Cultural, Educational and Welfare Institute Limited to establish the IQRA College of Brisbane at 97-109 Bardon Road (27.6499°S 153.0982°E). The school will be a co-education primary school (Prep-6) and expects to open on 24 January 2022. However, as at 2026, this school has not commenced operation.

== Amenities ==
Logan Central Multicultural Uniting Church is at 119 Bardon Road (27.6515°S 153.0983°E). It holds services in English, Samoan, and Tongan.

== Wetlands ==
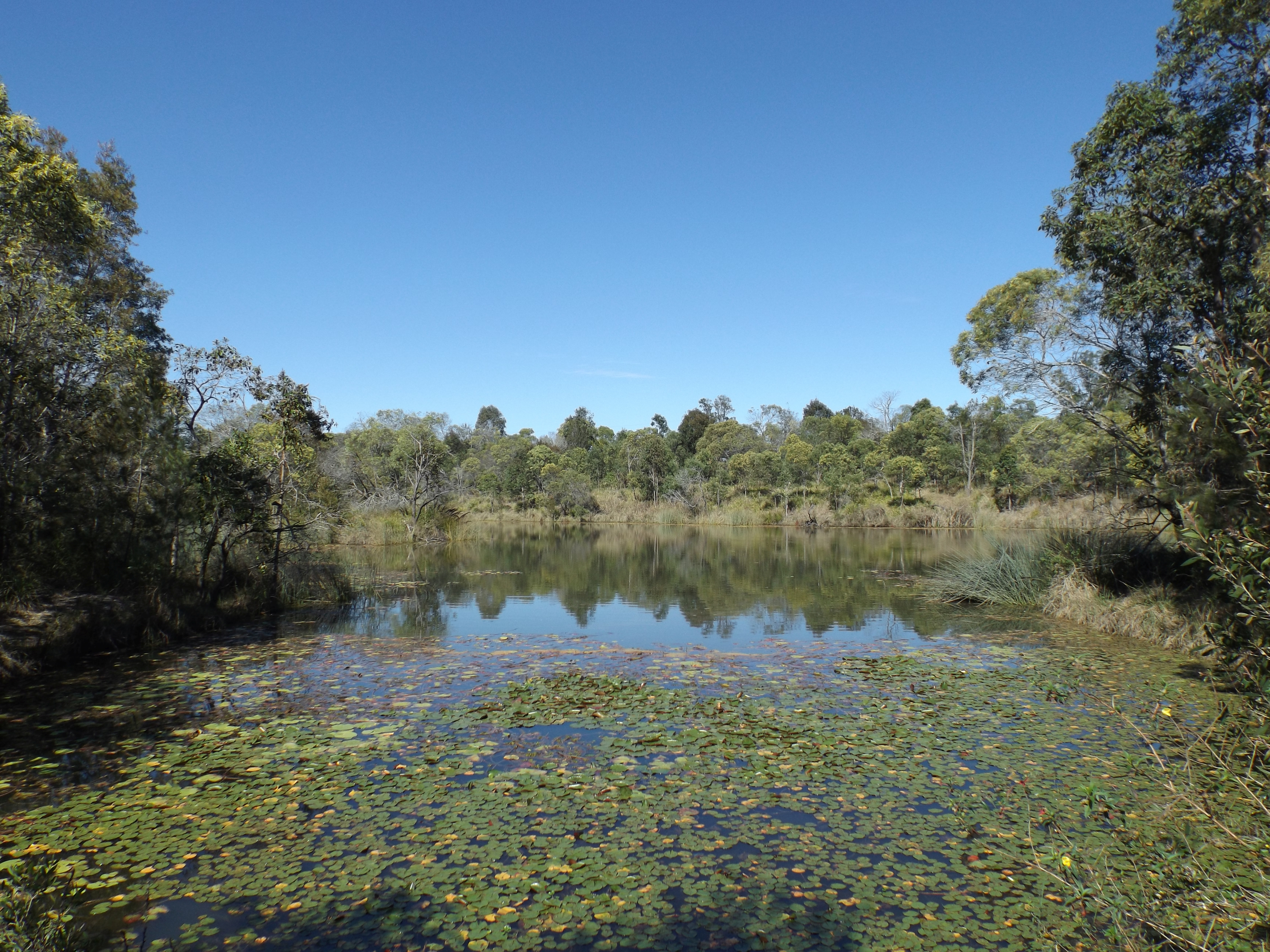
Billabong at Berrinba Wetlands, 2014

Berrinba Wetlands is a man-made recreational park covering 120 hectares (300 acres) along Scrubby Creek. Scrubby Creek joins Slacks Creek which enters the Logan River. The park contains 8.5 kilometres (5.3 mi) of walkways and bike tracks, nesting boxes and substantial bridges with rails designed to collapse during flooding if required. Non-native trees have been removed and more than 400,000 native plants were planted.
