= Mabel Park State School =

Location
- Cnr Aldrin St and Borman St; Slacks Creek, Queensland, 4127; Australia; 27°38′35.08″S 153°7′35.55″E

Information
- Type: Primary school
- Motto: Truth Conquers All
- Established: 1974
- Principal: Glenn Chippendale
- Grades: Prep to Year 6
- Enrolment: 722 (2023)
- Campuses: Two
- Colour: Maroon
- Website: mabelparkss.eq.edu.au

Mabel Park State School is a public, co-educational, primary school, located in the Logan City suburb of Slacks Creek, in Queensland, Australia. It is administered by the Department of Education, with an enrolment of 722 students and a teaching staff of 53, as of 2023. The school serves students from Prep to Year 6.

== History ==
The school opened on 29 January 1974.

In 2011, the prime minister of the time, Julia Gillard, visited the school to comfort the students involved in a major Slacks Creek house fire.

During February 2015, the school was sent into lockdown after it was believed that a murder suspect, who was on the run, was trying to contact his kids, who were attending the school at the time. The lockdown was lifted after the school grounds were searched and there was no sign of the suspect.

A fire destroyed two of the school's classrooms and caused the evacuation of its students in 2015, five students were treated for minor smoke inhalation.

== See also ==
- Education in Australia
- List of schools in Greater Brisbane
