= Stretton State College =

School in Queensland, Australia

Location
- 990 Gowan Road & 226 Illaweena Street; Stretton, Queensland; Australia; 27.638°S 153.058°E

Information
- Type: Public, college
- Motto: With purpose and spirit
- Established: 2006
- Principal: Jan Maresca
- Grades: P–12
- Enrolment: 4000+ (2022)
- Colours: Maroon, purple, navy blue and taupe

Stretton State College is an independent public, co-educational, P-12 school located in the Brisbane suburb of Stretton, Queensland, Australia. It is administered by the Queensland Department of Education, with an enrolment of 3,491 students and a teaching staff of 256 as of 2024. The school serves students from Prep to Year 12 across two campuses (a primary campus referred to as Gowan and a secondary campus referred to as Illaweena). It opened in 2006.

== Excellence programs ==
Stretton State College offers the following three Excellence Programs to students across both campuses:

- Lighthouse Academic Excellence Program
- Karawatha Cluster High Achievers Program
- Sports Academy Excellence Program

== Vocational Education & Training ==
Vocational Education & Training (VET) courses available to students in Years 11 and 12 include:

- Certificate I in Construction (CPC10111)
- Certificate II in Engineering Pathways (MEM20413)
- Certificate II in Hospitality (SIT20316)
- Certificate III in Business (BSB30115)
- Certificate III in Fitness (SIS30315)

== House system ==
Today, the school has 4 houses which include:

- Paterson Panthers
- Hollow Hawks
- Cowan Crocs
- Bradman Bulls

== Extracurricular ==
=== Clubs and activities ===
- Happy Snappers
- Science Club

=== Music ===
- Instrumental Music Program
- Musical activities (school choirs and productions)

=== Other activities ===
- Borrow-a-bot
- Brain Bee (Neuroscience)
- Chess
- Griffith Biology (an opportunity for Years 11 and 12 students studying Biology to complete a university course)

== Notable alumni ==
There is no Alumni lists on the Names Database, however, the school has a section of past students on its website. As for notable alumni, Henry Taefu attended the school.

== See also ==
- Education in Queensland
- List of schools in Greater Brisbane
