= Slacks Creek =

- Suburb
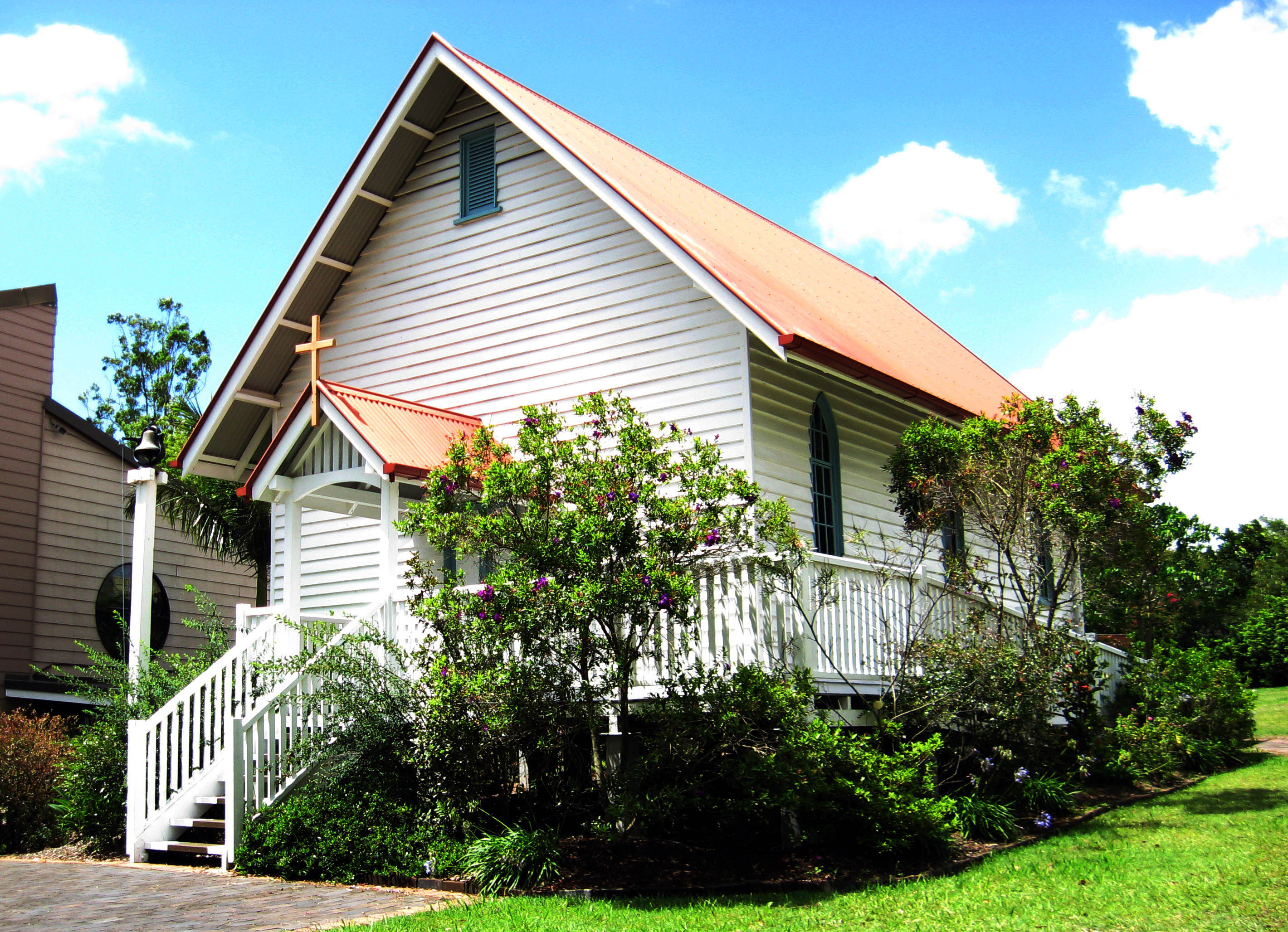
- St Mark's Anglican Church, 2010

- Interactive map of Slacks Creek
- Coordinates: 27.6444°S 153.1347°E
- Country: Australia
- State: Queensland
- City: Logan City
- LGA: Logan City
- Location: 2.9 km (1.8 mi) E of Logan Central; 25.2 km (15.7 mi) SSE of Brisbane CBD; 57 km (35 mi) NNW of Surfers Paradise
- Established: 1971

Government
  - State electorate: Waterford
  - Federal division: Rankin

Area
  - Total: 8.6 km^{2} (3.3 sq mi)
- Elevation: 20 m (66 ft)

Population
  - Total: 10,408 (2021 census)
  - Density: 1,210/km^{2} (3,134/sq mi)
- Time zone: UTC+10:00 (AEST)
- Postcode: 4127
Suburbs around Slacks Creek
Underwood	Springwood	Springwood
Woodridge; Logan Central	Slacks Creek	Daisy Hill
Kingston	Meadowbrook	Shailer Park; Tanah Merah

Slacks Creek is a suburb in the City of Logan, Queensland, Australia. In the 2021 census, Slacks Creek had a population of 10,408.

== Geography ==
The Pacific Motorway forms most of the eastern boundary of the suburb.

The creek that gave its name to the district is part of the Logan River catchment and was named after the Slack family who had a cattle run there before the days of closer settlement. The Aboriginal name for it was Mungaree, place of fishes, which is the name they gave to their property. In September 2006 Queensland's first IKEA store moved from its original home in the nearby suburb Rochedale South to its new location in Slacks Creek.

== History ==
Like a number of other Logan City suburbs Slacks Creek was once part of the Shire of Tingalpa. It was first officially named by Queensland Place Names Board on 1 April 1971. It was bounded as a locality by on 31 March 1979 and redesignated as a suburb on 31 August 1991.

Slacks Creek Provisional School opened on 19 May 1873 in the original Wesleyan Church located in Centenary Road. In July 1879 it relocated to a new site on Loganlea Road. Due to flooding at that site, it was moved in 1893 to Logan Road near the intersection with Daisy Hill Road. On 1 January 1909 it became Slacks Creek State School. In 1964, due to the increasingly heavy traffic on Logan Road, the school was relocated to its current site. On 14 October 2016 it was renamed Daisy Hill State School as changes to the suburban boundaries had resulted in the school falling within the neighbouring suburb of Daisy Hill.

Mabel Park State School opened on 29 January 1974. On 23 January 1978, a separate Mabel Park State Infants School was split off from the main school. The infants school closed on 12 December 1997 and was reintegrated with the main school.

== Demographics ==
In the 2021 census, Slacks Creek had a population of 10,408, 49.8% female and 50.2% male. The median age of the Slacks Creek population was 35 years, 3 years below the national median. 61.4% of people living in Slacks Creek were born in Australia. The other top responses for country of birth were New Zealand 7.8%, England 2.5%, Samoa 1.4%, Philippines 1.2%, and India 1.1%. 70.5% of people spoke only English at home; the next most common languages were 2.2% Samoan, 1.1% Arabic and Mandarin, and Hazaraghi and Korean 0.9%.

In the 2016 census, Slacks Creek had a population of 10,432, 50.9% female and 49.1% male. The median age of the Slacks Creek population was 34 years, 4 years below the national median. 61.3% of people living in Slacks Creek were born in Australia. The other top responses for country of birth were New Zealand 8.9%, England 3%, Samoa and Afghanistan 1.4%, and India 1.3%. 71% of people spoke only English at home; the next most common languages were 2.8% Samoan, 1.2% Arabic, 1% Khmer, and 0.9% Hazaraghi and Tongan.

In the 2011 census, Slacks Creek recorded a population of 10,435, 50.7% female and 49.3% male. The median age of the Slacks Creek population was 32 years, 5 years below the national median. 62.9% of people living in Slacks Creek were born in Australia. The other top responses for country of birth were New Zealand 9.9%, England 3.3%, Samoa 1.5%, Philippines 0.9%, and Fiji 0.8%. 75.9% of people spoke only English at home; the next most common languages were 3% Samoan, 1% Hindi, 0.6% Khmer, 0.6% Arabic, 0.6% Romanian.

== Education ==
Mabel Park State School is a government primary (Prep–6) school for boys and girls at Borman Street (27.6431°S 153.1264°E). In 2018, the school had an enrolment of 730 students with 54 teachers (53 full-time equivalent) and 41 non-teaching staff (29 full-time equivalent). It includes a special education program.

Mabel Park State High School is a government secondary (7–12) school for boys and girls at 72-116 Paradise Road (27.6396°S 153.1288°E). In 2018, the school had an enrolment of 906 students with 88 teachers (82 full-time equivalent) and 47 non-teaching staff (35 full-time equivalent). It includes a special education program.

== Notable residents ==
- Singer and songwriter Darren Hayes who rose to fame in the late 90s as the lead vocalist for Savage Garden.
