= Karawatha Forest =

Forest in Karawatha and Stretton, Brisbane, Australia

Coordinates: 27.63°S 153.08°E

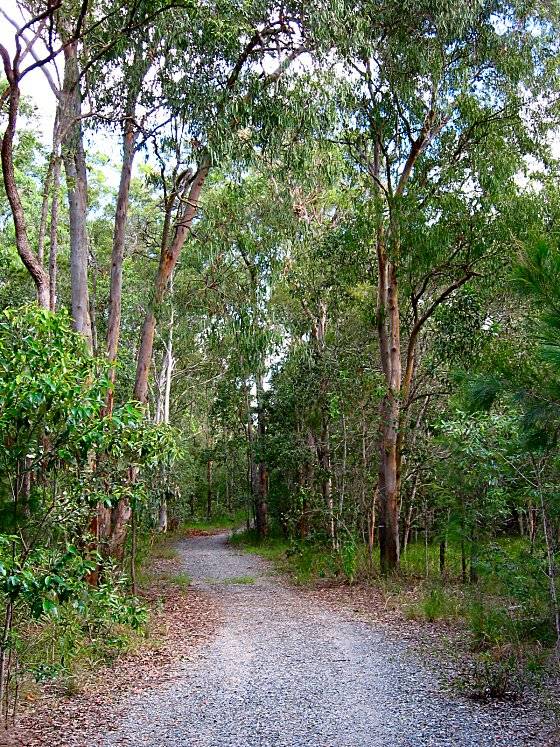
- Forest track
- Interactive map of Karawatha Forest
- Type: Nature reserve
- Nearest city: Brisbane, Queensland, Australia
- Operator: Brisbane City Council
- Open: Open all year

Karawatha Forest or Karawatha nature reserve is approximately 900 hectares of bushland in the Brisbane suburbs of Karawatha and Stretton, Australia. It is one of the largest areas of remnant bushland within Brisbane. The predominant vegetation types in the forest are dry eucalypt forest and woodland with native heath understories. The Karawatha Forest Protection Society was formed to ensure that the bushland was protected from development and is owned and managed by the Brisbane City Council (BCC). Funds raised from the BCC's Bushland Preservation Levy have enabled the acquisition of land for preservation of Karawatha Forest.

The subtropical bushland reserve contains an important wetland area along Scrubby Creek and an unnamed creek, both of which flow into Slacks Creek, tributary of the Logan River. Significant landmarks within the forest include Poet's Rock, the Old Quarry, Curtisii (formerly Paratz) Lookout, "the Rocks," Frog Hollow and the Illaweena Lagoon system. Along the western edge of the forest is the Gateway Motorway.

The reserve was first declared in 1906.

== Fauna ==
The wetlands provides habitat for a number of threatened and endangered species including the powerful owl, glossy black cockatoo and the green thighed frog. Also found within the park are the red-necked wallaby, swamp wallaby and eastern grey kangaroo. While not threatened or endangered the reserve is home to greater gliders, squirrel gliders and sugar gliders.

=== Wildlife movement corridor ===
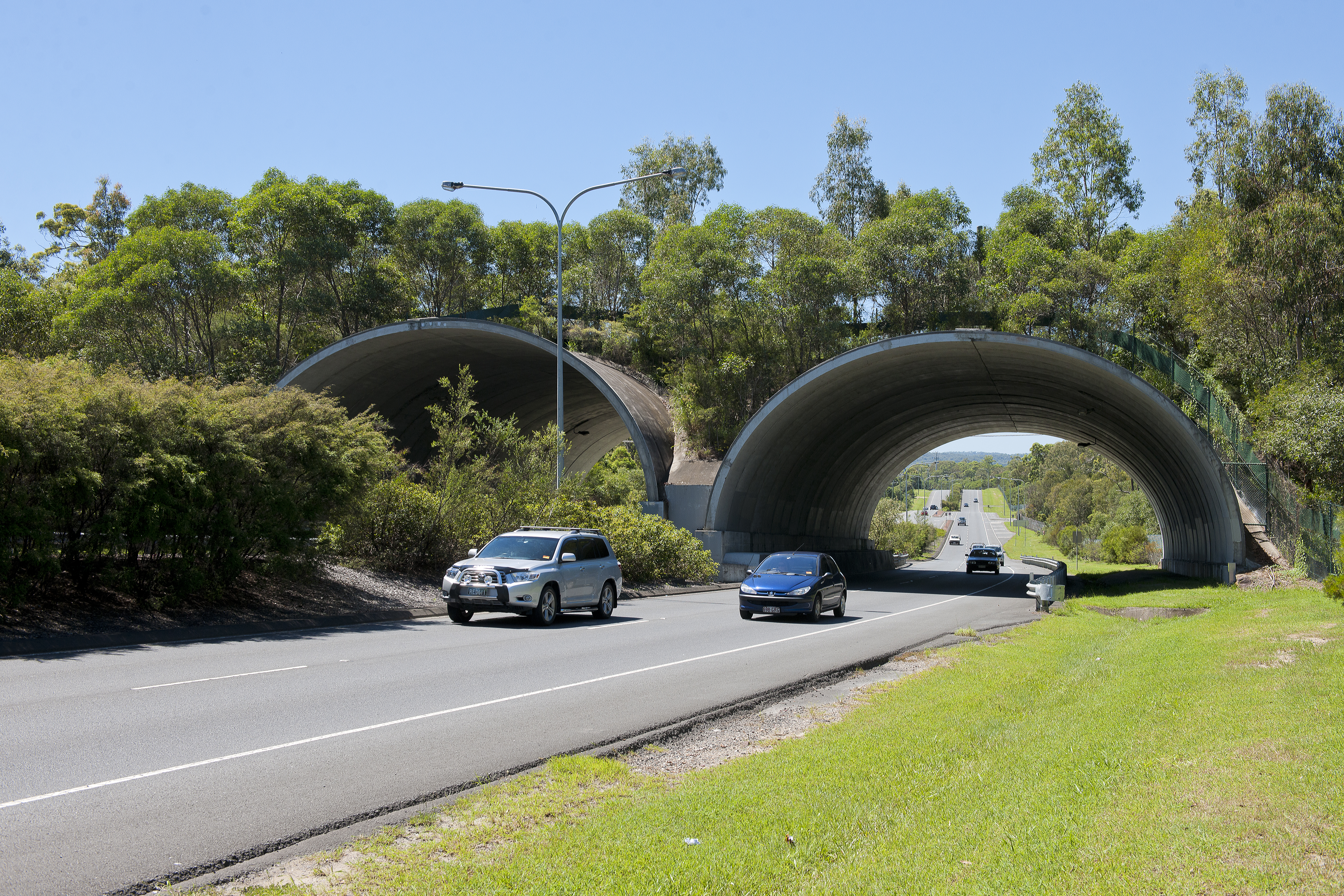
Compton Road land-bridge

In the south of the reserve wildlife movement infrastructure consisting of a land-bridge over Compton Road has been a success. The Compton Road fauna overpass is the most intensively studied in the country. It links the forest to the northern Kuraby bushland. The corridor also included two fauna underpasses, three rope ladders and a line of glider poles.

== Research ==
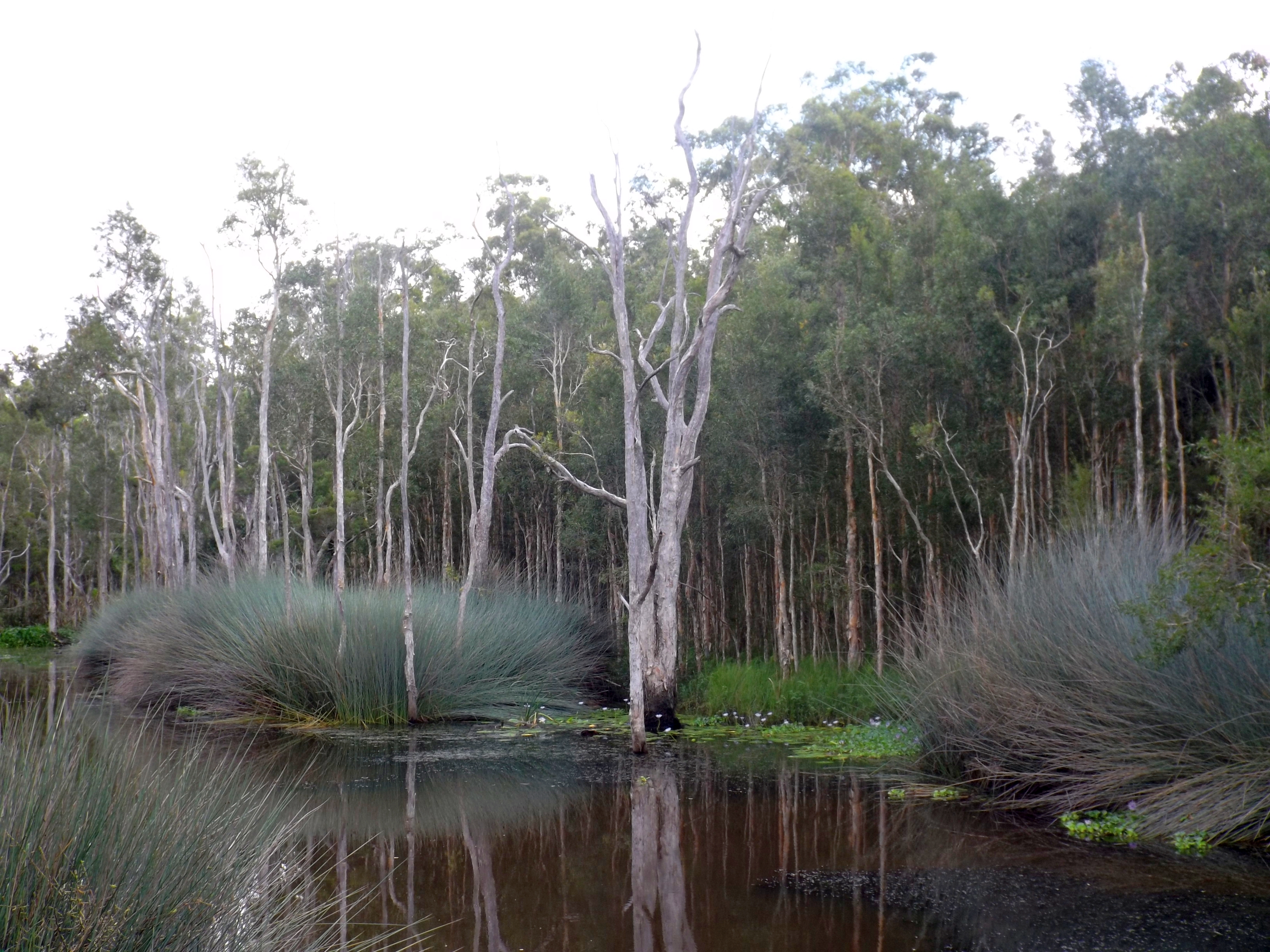
Illaweena Lagoon, 2015

Karawatha forest was one of two sites in Australia at which a PPBio Research Grid was established and completed. The project was undertake from 1 July 2009 to 31 December 2013.

== Recreation ==
The Karawatha Forest Discovery Centre provides interactive displays, wildlife exhibits and sustainability-themed activities. Its facilities include a nature play space and an interactive display area.

The reserve has more than 42 kilometres (26 mi) of walking and shared-use tracks, including 30 graded walking tracks. Mountain biking is permitted on designated tracks. Camping requires council consent, horse riding is restricted to designated areas or otherwise requires consent, and motorbike riding is prohibited. Two picnic areas, located near the Discovery Centre on Acacia Road and at Illaweena Street, provide sheltered seating and drinking water taps. Electric barbecues are available at the Discovery Centre picnic area. The park is open daily from 6 am to 6 pm.

The reserve also contains a disused, water-filled quarry. In 2014, the Karawatha Forest Protection Society reported that Brisbane City Council had committed to improving fencing around the quarry to restrict access. The quarry is fenced off, and swimming is prohibited. In February 2016, the Karawatha Forest Protection Society reported that Brisbane City Council officers and Queensland Police had conducted enforcement patrols targeting illegal swimming and other activities in the forest, including the quarry area.

== See also ==
- Flora of Brisbane
- Forests of Australia
