= Karawatha =

- Suburb
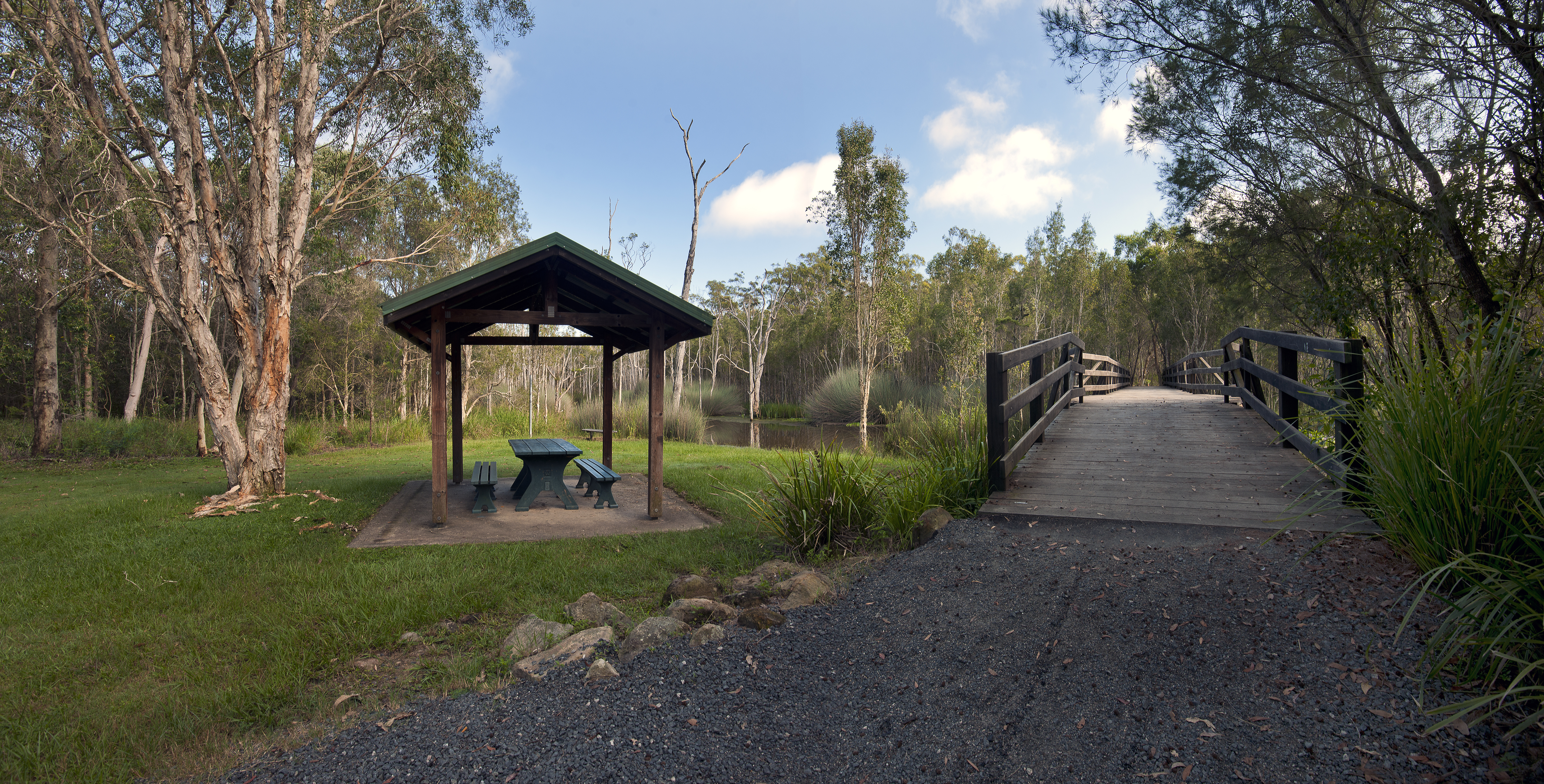
- Karawatha Forest, 2012

- Interactive map of Karawatha
- Coordinates: 27.6322°S 153.0830°E
- Country: Australia
- State: Queensland
- City: Brisbane
- LGA: City of Brisbane (Calamvale Ward)
- Location: 25.4 km (15.8 mi) SSE of Brisbane CBD

Government
  - State electorate: Stretton
  - Federal division: Moreton

Area
  - Total: 8.6 km^{2} (3.3 sq mi)

Population
  - Total: 337 (2021 census)
  - Density: 39.19/km^{2} (101.5/sq mi)
- Time zone: UTC+10:00 (AEST)
- Postcode: 4117
Suburbs around Karawatha
Stretton	Kuraby	Woodridge
Stretton	Karawatha	Woodridge
Drewvale	Berrinba	Logan Central

Karawatha is an outer southern suburb in the City of Brisbane, Queensland, Australia. In the 2021 census, Karawatha had a population of 337 people.

== Geography ==
Karawatha is 22 kilometres (14 mi) south-east of the Brisbane CBD.

Karawatha is a sparsely populated suburb with few structures and the majority of the land used as undeveloped park land, known as Karawatha Forest.

== History ==
The naming of the suburb Karawatha originates from an Aboriginal word meaning a place with pine trees.

It was formerly known as Berrinba, but now Berrinba is the name of the suburb to the south within Logan City.

== Demographics ==
In the 2016 census, Karawatha had a population of 19 people.

In the 2021 census, Karawatha had a population of 337 people.

== See also ==
- List of Brisbane suburbs
