= Marsden State School =

Location
- Logan City, Queensland; Australia; 27°41′5.22″S 153°6′13.33″E

Information
- Type: Co-education, primary, public
- Motto: Merit is Ours
- Established: 1978
- Principal: Kevin Leathwaite
- Grades: Preparatory to Year 6
- Enrolment: 1,375 (2023)
- Colours: Green and gold
- Website: marsdenss.eq.edu.au

Marsden State School is a public co-educational primary school located in the Logan City suburb of Marsden, Queensland, Australia. It is administered by the Queensland Department of Education, with an enrolment of 1,375 students and a teaching staff of 101, as of 2023. The school serves students from Prep to Year 6.

== History ==
The school opened on 23 January 1978.

== See also ==
- List of schools in Greater Brisbane
