= Henry Taefu =

Samoa international rugby union player

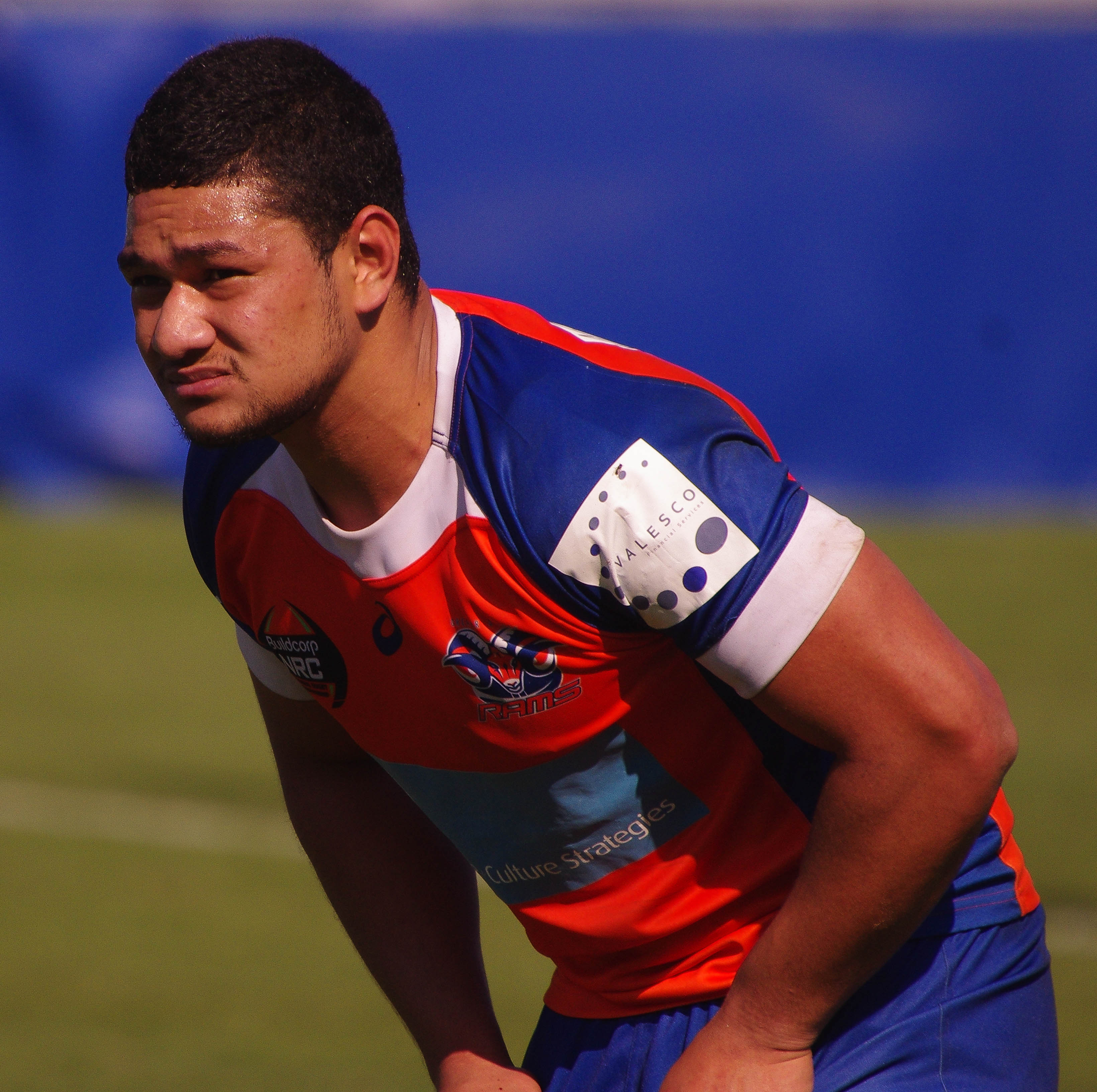
- Taefu during a match representing the Greater Sydney Rams, October 2014
- Full name: Leo Henry Taefu
- Born: 2 April 1993 (age 33) Apia, Samoa
- Height: 183 cm (6 ft 0 in)
- Weight: 100 kg (220 lb; 15 st 10 lb)
- School: Stretton State College

Rugby union career
- Position: Centre
- Current team: Red Hurricanes Osaka
Senior career
Years	Team	Apps	(Points)
2014	Greater Sydney Rams	6	(15)
2015–2017	Brisbane City	12	(12)
2016	Reds	4	(11)
2017–2018	Colomiers	20	(20)
2018–2021	Force	27	(10)
2021-2023	North Harbour	2	(0)
2022–2024	Moana Pasifika	8	(0)
2024–	Red Hurricanes Osaka	25	(0)
- Correct as of 20 July 2022
International career
Years	Team	Apps	(Points)
2013	Australia U20	2	(0)
2017–	Samoa	12	(63)
- Correct as of 20 July 2022

Henry Taefu (born 2 April 1993) is a Samoan professional Rugby Union player. He currently plays for North Harbour in the Bunnings NPC and Moana Pasifika in the Super Rugby Pacific, having previously played for the Western Force in Australia's Super Rugby AU. His playing position is inside centre.

== Early / provincial career ==
Taefu was born in Apia, the capital city of Samoa, but moved to New Zealand with his family at age 9, then to Brisbane in Australia aged 12. He attended school at the famed Anglican Church Grammar School in Brisbane and upon graduation joined the Parramatta Eels, a rugby league club based in the suburbs of Sydney. However, in 2012 he moved back to Queensland and joined Queensland Premier Rugby side Sunnybank. He helped the Dragons reach the grand final of the competition in 2014 and was the team's 5th highest point scorer in 2015. His form at this level earned selection for the Greater Sydney Rams ahead of the inaugural National Rugby Championship in 2014. He was on the move again in 2015, heading back north to Brisbane to join Brisbane City.

== Super Rugby career ==
Taefu's performances over 2 seasons in the National Rugby Championship saw Super Rugby franchise, the Queensland Reds, come calling in 2016. He debuted in the derby match against the Waratahs on 27 February and went on to make 4 appearances during the season, netting 4 conversions and one penalty. On 17 October 2021, it was announced that Henry signed with the new Super Rugby franchise, Moana Pasifika

== International ==
Taefu was selected as a member of the Australia Under-20 squad which competed in the 2013 IRB Junior World Championship in France. He played 2 matches before succumbing to a shoulder injury which required surgery that in turn uncovered an undiagnosed adrenal gland tumour. He has played for the Manu Samoa since 2017 and played in their 2019 Rugby World Cup Squad. He scored all 19 points in the third pool game against Japan. In 2021, he started both 2023 World Cup Qualifiers against Tonga.

== Super Rugby statistics ==
As of 17 August 2016

Season	Team	Games	Starts	Sub	Mins	Tries	Cons	Pens	Drops	Points	Yel	Red
2016	Reds	4	4	0	207	0	4	1	0	11	0	0
Total		4	4	0	207	0	4	1	0	11	0	0
