= Stretton, Queensland =

Stretton
- Suburb
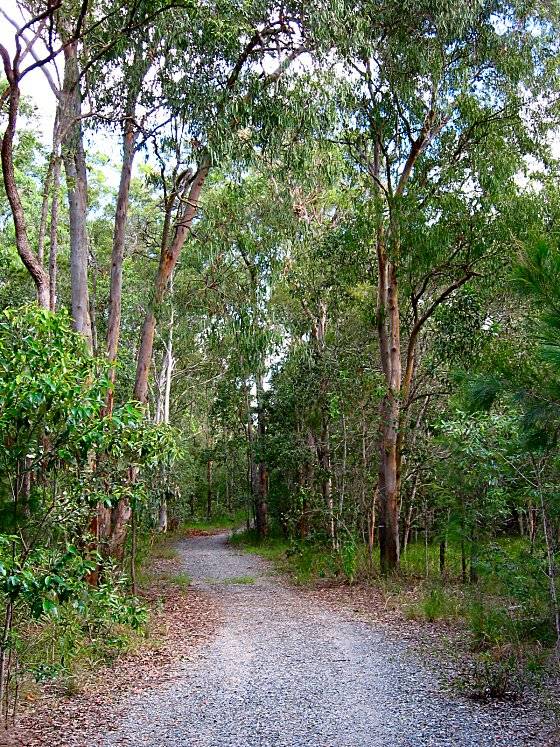
- Track into Karawatha Forest at Stretton

- Interactive map of Stretton
- Coordinates: 27.6236°S 153.0680°E
- Country: Australia
- State: Queensland
- City: Brisbane
- LGA: City of Brisbane (Calamvale Ward)
- Location: 22 km (14 mi) S of Brisbane GPO

Government
  - State electorate: Stretton
  - Federal division: Rankin

Area
  - Total: 4.5 km^{2} (1.7 sq mi)

Population
  - Total: 4,686 (2021 census)
  - Density: 1,041/km^{2} (2,697/sq mi)
- Time zone: UTC+10:00 (AEST)
- Postcode: 4116
Suburbs around Stretton
Sunnybank Hills	Runcorn	Kuraby
Calamvale	Stretton	Karawatha
Drewvale	Drewvale	Karawatha

Stretton is a southern suburb in the City of Brisbane, Queensland, Australia. In the 2021 census, Stretton had a population of 4,686 people.

== Geography ==
Stretton is 17 kilometres (11 mi) from the Brisbane Central Business District, and borders the suburbs of Calamvale, Sunnybank Hills, Karawatha, Kuraby, and Drewvale.

The northern part of Stretton includes several hills, but the land flattens out towards the south. The southern part has more vegetation, as it joins Karawatha Forest to the south-east and the Calamvale Creek wetlands on the south-west.

== History ==
In the early 19th century, the area and many of today's suburbs around the Sunnybank area were part of a vast area known as Coopers Plains. In 1861, Governor Bowen declared a wide area that included Eight Mile Plains to Stretton as a Brisbane Agricultural Reserve. This agricultural reserve was originally used as a source of timber, but when it was found to be good farming land, settlers quickly turned it into farms that produced sought-after fruit, vegetables, and poultry.

A military map from 1922 shows only four houses in the area that is now Stretton.

Stretton was gazetted as a suburb of Brisbane in 1972, and was named after George Stretton, a settler, postmaster and hotelier at Browns Plains in the 1870s.

In 1989, there was controversy regarding the sale of land to Asian investors.

Stretton State College opened on 1 January 2006.

== Demographics ==
In the 2011 census, Stretton had a population of 4,067 people, 51.5% female and 48.5% male. The median age was 36 years, 1 year below the Australian median. 41.6% were born in Australia, compared to the national average of 69.8%. The next most common countries of birth were China 7.1%, Taiwan 7%, New Zealand 4.1%, Hong Kong 4% and India 3.1%. 41.4% of people spoke only English at home. The next most popular languages were 16.2% Mandarin, 11.3% Cantonese, 3.3% Vietnamese, 2.9% Hindi and 2.4% Korean. The weekly median household income in Stretton was $1,843, compared to the national median of $1,234. This difference is also reflected in real estate, with the median mortgage payment being $2,400 per month, compared to the national median of $1,800.

In the 2016 census, Stretton had a population of 4,334.

In the 2021 census, Stretton had a population of 4,686 people. 39.1% were born in Australia, compared to the national average of 66.9%. The next most common countries of birth were Mainland China 14.7%, Taiwan 6.4%, New Zealand 4.0%, India 3.8% and Hong Kong 3.7%. 34.6% of people spoke only English at home. The next most popular languages were 24.5% Mandarin, 9.9% Cantonese, 3.0% Vietnamese, 2.5% Hindi and 2.1% Korean. The main ancestral backgrounds of residents were Chinese 38%, English 12.1%, Australian 11.4%, Indian 10.3% and Vietnamese 3.5%. The main religions were No religion, so described 37%, Catholic 13%, Islam 11.2%, Buddhism 7.9% and Hinduism 5.7%.

== Education ==
Stretton State College is a government primary and secondary (Prep-12) school for boys and girls at 226 Illaweena Street (27.6395°S 153.0537°E). In 2018, the school had an enrolment of 2,590 students with 196 teachers (180 full-time equivalent) and 101 non-teaching staff (71 full-time equivalent). It includes a special education program.

== Facilities ==
Stretton is home to Hope Christian Assembly, a multicultural Pentecostal Church affiliated with Australian Christian Churches which holds services at Stretton State College.

In addition to small local shops, Calamvale Village on Kameruka Street and Sunnybank Hills Shopping Town on Compton Road provide basic shopping. Westfield Garden City at Upper Mount Gravatt is a larger shopping centre nearby.
