= Logan Central =

- Suburb
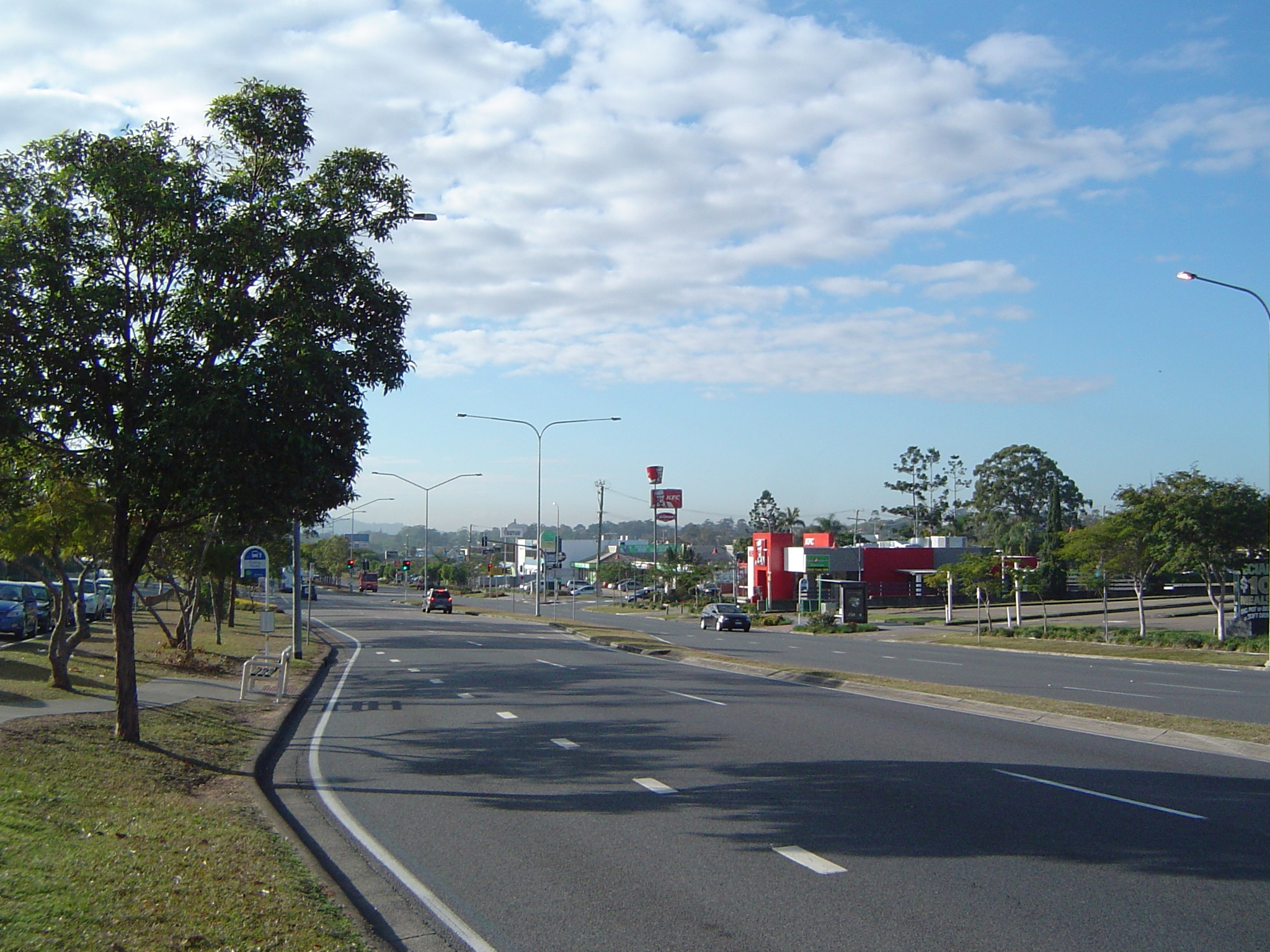
- Wembley Road, 2014

- Interactive map of Logan Central
- Coordinates: 27.6436°S 153.1075°E
- Country: Australia
- State: Queensland
- City: Logan City
- LGA: Logan City
- Location: 24.5 km (15.2 mi) SSE of Brisbane CBD; 59 km (37 mi) NNW of Surfers Paradise
- Established: 1986

Government
  - State electorate: Woodridge
  - Federal division: Rankin

Area
  - Total: 2.9 km^{2} (1.1 sq mi)
- Elevation: 25 m (82 ft)

Population
  - Total: 6,210 (2021 census)
  - Density: 2,140/km^{2} (5,550/sq mi)
- Time zone: UTC+10:00 (AEST)
- Postcode: 4114
Suburbs around Logan Central
Woodridge	Woodridge	Slacks Creek
Karawatha	Logan Central	Slacks Creek
Berrinba	Kingston	Kingston

Logan Central is a mixed-use suburb that serves as the central business district and administrative centre of the City of Logan, Queensland, Australia. In the 2021 census, Logan Central had a population of 6,210 people.

== Geography ==
Once forming part of Woodridge, Logan Central is the official central business district of Logan City and is a major activity centre, with many shops and local businesses operating in the area, mostly along the Wembley Road corridor.

Woodridge railway station is located in Logan Central. It is also well-serviced by a number of bus routes.

=== Climate ===
Logan Central experiences a humid subtropical climate (Köppen: Cfa), with hot, muggy summers and mild, relatively dry winters.

Climate data for Logan City (27º40'48"S, 153º12'OO"E, 10 m AMSL) (1992–2024 normals and extremes)
Month	Jan	Feb	Mar	Apr	May	Jun	Jul	Aug	Sep	Oct	Nov	Dec	Year
Record high °C (°F)	41.9 (107.4)	41.0 (105.8)	38.9 (102.0)	33.8 (92.8)	31.1 (88.0)	29.3 (84.7)	29.3 (84.7)	34.3 (93.7)	38.4 (101.1)	37.7 (99.9)	40.7 (105.3)	40.3 (104.5)	41.9 (107.4)
Mean daily maximum °C (°F)	29.9 (85.8)	29.5 (85.1)	28.6 (83.5)	26.5 (79.7)	24.0 (75.2)	21.7 (71.1)	21.6 (70.9)	22.9 (73.2)	25.2 (77.4)	26.6 (79.9)	28.0 (82.4)	29.1 (84.4)	26.1 (79.1)
Mean daily minimum °C (°F)	20.7 (69.3)	20.6 (69.1)	19.3 (66.7)	16.2 (61.2)	12.7 (54.9)	10.1 (50.2)	9.0 (48.2)	9.6 (49.3)	12.6 (54.7)	15.1 (59.2)	17.5 (63.5)	19.3 (66.7)	15.2 (59.4)
Record low °C (°F)	13.4 (56.1)	15.0 (59.0)	12.4 (54.3)	7.8 (46.0)	2.5 (36.5)	2.0 (35.6)	−0.5 (31.1)	0.8 (33.4)	4.4 (39.9)	7.8 (46.0)	8.5 (47.3)	11.8 (53.2)	−0.5 (31.1)
Average precipitation mm (inches)	121.9 (4.80)	174.4 (6.87)	138.2 (5.44)	78.0 (3.07)	101.9 (4.01)	66.6 (2.62)	36.8 (1.45)	40.6 (1.60)	40.2 (1.58)	72.3 (2.85)	100.1 (3.94)	122.2 (4.81)	1,090 (42.91)
Average precipitation days (≥ 1.0 mm)	9.4	11.0	10.8	7.9	7.5	5.9	5.4	4.1	4.9	6.9	8.5	9.5	91.8
Average afternoon relative humidity (%)	64	65	63	61	59	57	53	52	52	57	61	61	59
Average dew point °C (°F)	20.3 (68.5)	20.2 (68.4)	18.6 (65.5)	16.3 (61.3)	13.4 (56.1)	11.0 (51.8)	9.7 (49.5)	10.3 (50.5)	12.3 (54.1)	14.8 (58.6)	17.1 (62.8)	18.7 (65.7)	15.2 (59.4)
Source: Bureau of Meteorology (1992–2024 normals and extremes)

== History ==
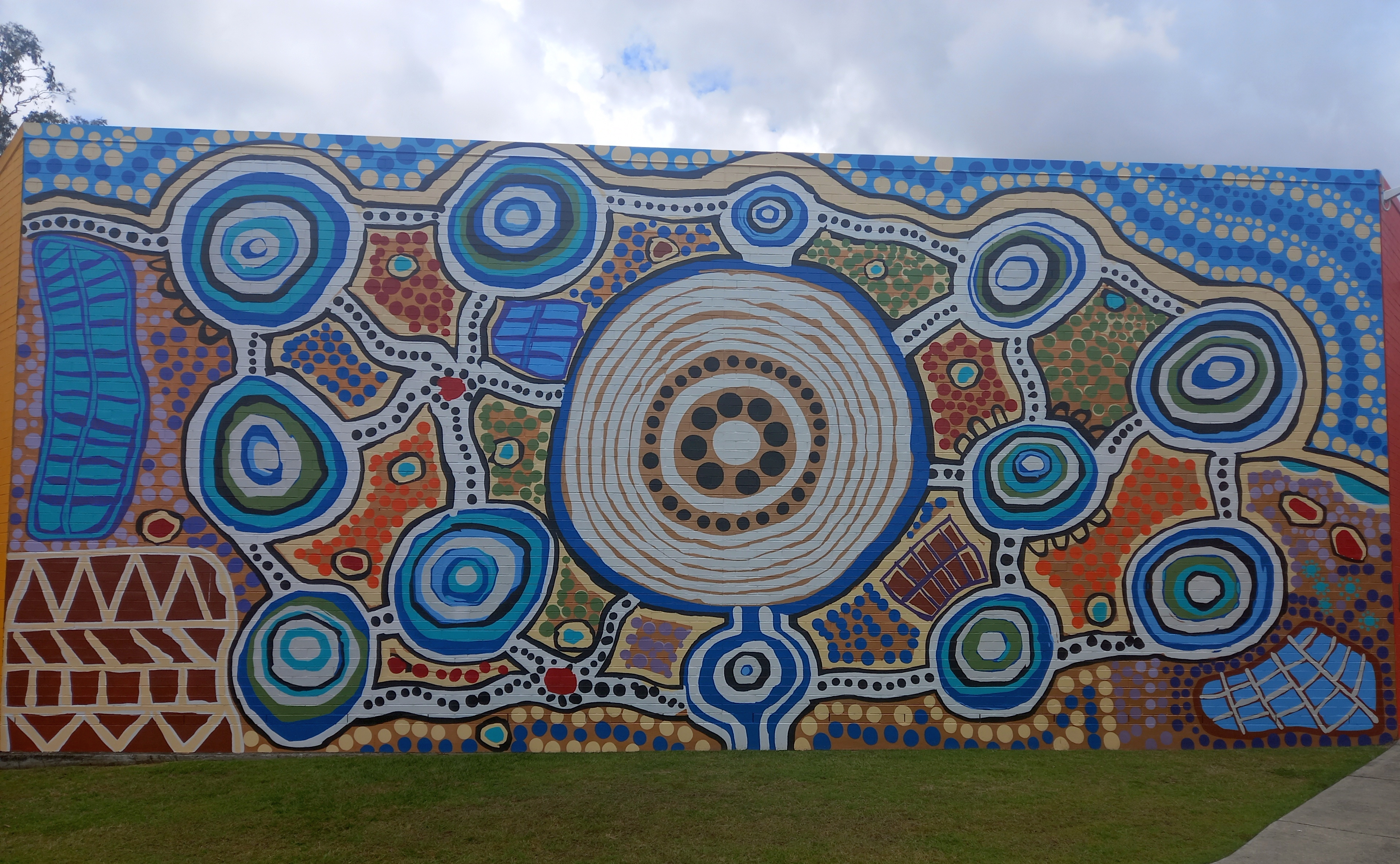
Mural at the Logan City Council Art Gallery, 2021

Woodridge Provisional School opened on 20 May 1924 with 21 students and Miss Dorothy Tuke as the first teacher. In 1932 it relocated to the current site and became Woodridge State School.

Woodridge State School opened on 20 May 1924.

Woodridge Opportunity School opened on 1 January 1972. Circa 1997 it was renamed Logan City Special School.

Woodridge State High School opened on 1 February 1972.

In 1985 the intention was that Logan Central would consist only of the "Logan City Council Administration Centre and contiguous Council properties", but it was subsequently enlarged with land excised from both Woodridge and Kingston.

== Demographics ==
In the 2011 census, Logan Central had a population of 6,172 people, 49.6% female and 50.4% male. Most of the housing in the suburb is detached homes with around one quarter of residents living in a unit or apartment with more than half of the households renting. The median age of the Logan Central population was 32 years, 5 years below the national median of 37. 50.3% of people living in Logan Central were born in Australia. The other top responses for country of birth were New Zealand 9.6%, Burma 3.2%, England 2.5%, Samoa 2.5%, Philippines 1.5%. 59.7% of people spoke only English at home; the next most common languages were 5.4% Samoan, 1.6% Karen, 1.3% Kirundi (Rundi), 1.3% Burmese, 1.3% Arabic.

In the 2016 census, Logan Central had a population of 5,945 people.

In the 2021 census, Logan Central had a population of 6,210 people.

== Education ==
Woodridge State School is a government primary (Prep–6) school for boys and girls at 113–131 Wembley Road (corner of Railway Parade, 27.6415°S 153.1048°E). In 2018, the school had an enrolment of 751 students with 78 teachers (69 full-time equivalent) and 52 non-teaching staff (35 full-time equivalent). It includes a special education program and an intensive England language program.

Logan City Special School is a special primary and secondary (Early Childhood to Year 12) school for boys and girls at 133 Wembley Road (27.6423°S 153.1024°E). In 2018, the school had an enrolment of 171 students with 43 teachers (40 full-time equivalent) and 45 non-teaching staff (30 full-time equivalent).PLACE Positive Learning Centre is a specific-purpose primary and secondary (5–10) school at Wembley Road (27.6433°S 153.0991°E). A Positive Learning Centre accepts students who require intervention not possible in a conventional classroom and works towards reintegrating the students into a conventional classroom or towards vocational pathways.

Woodridge State High School is a government secondary (7–12) school for boys and girls at Wembley Road (27.6433°S 153.0991°E). In 2018, the school had an enrolment of 1,327 students with 130 teachers (126 full-time equivalent) and 58 non-teaching staff (46 full-time equivalent). It includes a special education program.

== Amenities ==
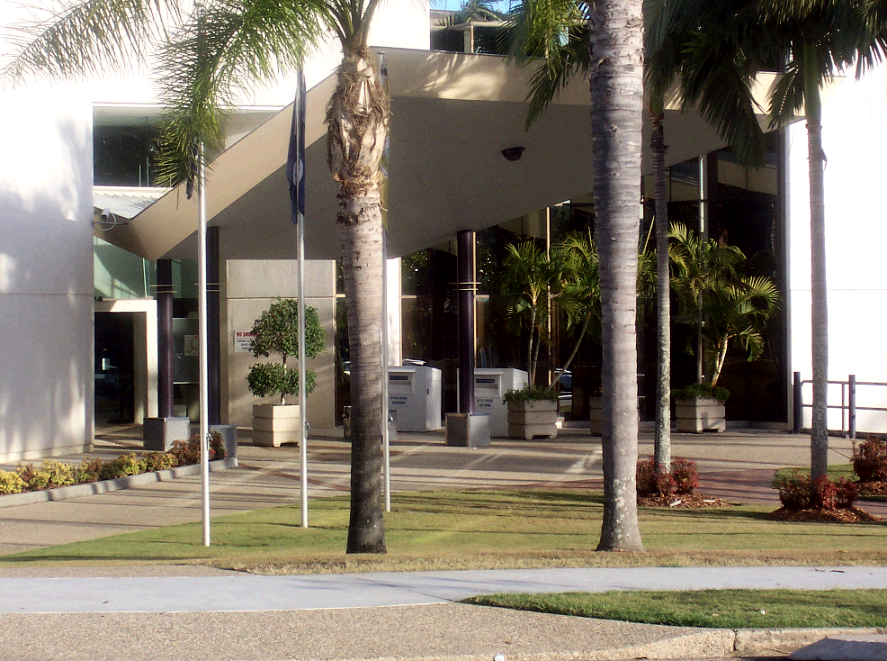
Logan City Council offices

The suburb is also home to the Logan City Council offices, Logan Art Gallery, a public library, police station and the Logan Brothers Rugby League Football Club. The art gallery opened in 1995.

The Logan City Council operate the Logan Central Library at 26 Wilbur Street. The library opened in 2011.

Logan Gardens was built in 1980s and fifteen and a half hectares of land was procured from the Queensland Housing Commission in 1987 for further development of the green area. It has amenities, like car parking, children's playground and pathways. The Garden was utilised for hosting the Olympic Torch Relay's lighting of the cauldron in the year 2000.
