= Woodridge State High School =

Coordinates: 27.6426°S 153.0989°E

- Logan Central, Queensland; Australia

Information
- Type: Public, co-educational, secondary
- Motto: Faith, Knowledge, Understanding.
- Established: 1972
- Principal: Kathleen Janecek
- Enrolment: 1200 (as of May 2016)
- Colours: Dark blue and white
- Website: https://woodridgeshs.eq.edu.au

Woodridge State High School is a co-educational, state secondary school in Logan Central, a suburb of Logan City, Queensland, Australia. The school opened in 1972. As of 2025, it has an enrolment of approximately 1400 students. The current principal is Kathleen Janecek.

== History ==
Woodridge State High School opened in 1972 during a period of rapid increase in primary school enrolment in the Woodridge area. The school built its community hall in 1976. In 2017, Woodridge State High School celebrated its 45th anniversary of educating students since its opening in 1972.

== Sport ==
As with many Queensland state schools, Woodridge State High runs annual swimming, athletics and cross country carnivals, giving students the opportunity to become Age Champion to progress to district carnivals In addition, the school participates in an inter-school sports program, where schools in the district are pitted against each other. Winners may progress to the district premiers, and then to the Metropolitan finals. In adherence with the seasons, different sports are played during the Summer and Winter months.

== Cultural ==
The school claims it hosts students from over 60 cultural backgrounds. The school hosted a talk by 2016 Australian of the Year David Morrison in line with its Harmony Day events.

== See also ==
- Lists of schools in Queensland
- Education in Australia
