= Division of Rankin =

Australian federal electoral division

Coordinates: 27.642°S 153.094°E

Rankin Australian House of Representatives Division
- Interactive map of boundaries since the 2019 federal election
- Created: 1984
- MP: Jim Chalmers
- Party: Labor
- Namesake: Dame Annabelle Rankin
- Electors: 114,981 (2025)
- Area: 131 km^{2} (50.6 sq mi)
- Demographic: Outer metropolitan
Electorates around Rankin:
Moreton	Moreton	Bonner
Oxley	Rankin	Bowman
Wright	Forde	Forde

The Division of Rankin is an Australian electoral division in the state of Queensland. It is to the southeast of Brisbane, comprising parts of the City of Brisbane and City of Logan.

The Australian Labor Party (ALP) has continuously held the seat since its establishment in 1984. Since 2013 its MP has been Jim Chalmers, who has been Treasurer of Australia under Prime Minister Anthony Albanese since 2022.

== Geography ==
Since 1984, federal electoral division boundaries in Australia have been determined at redistributions by determined by a redistribution made up of statutory appointments. Redistributions occur for the boundaries of divisions in a particular state, and they occur every seven years, or sooner if a state's representation entitlement changes or when divisions of a state are malapportioned.

Today Rankin is based on the outer southern suburbs of the City of Brisbane, in addition to portions of the City of Logan.

== History ==
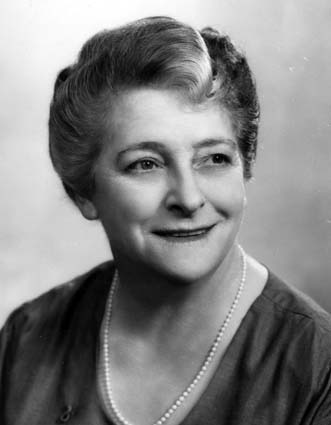
Dame Annabelle Rankin, the division's namesake

The division was created in 1984 and is named after Dame Annabelle Rankin, the first Queensland woman elected to the Senate. Rankin served as a government minister under four successive prime ministers in the 1960s and 1970s, before she was appointed High Commissioner of Australia to New Zealand, becoming the first woman to head an Australian mission overseas.

In its original form, Rankin covered the Gold Coast hinterland including Lamington National Park and the major town of Beaudesert as well as some outer metropolitan areas of Brisbane. In this situation it was a marginal seat held by the Labor Party. However, with the transfer of the rural hinterland to Forde, Rankin became a much safer Labor seat, being one of only two Queensland seats the ALP retained in the 1996 election.

== Members ==
Image	Member	Party	Term	Notes
	David Beddall (1948–)	Labor	1 December 1984 – 31 August 1998	Previously held the Division of Fadden. Served as minister under Hawke and Keating. Retired
	Craig Emerson (1954–)	Labor	3 October 1998 – 5 August 2013	Served as minister under Rudd and Gillard. Retired
	Jim Chalmers (1978–)	Labor	7 September 2013 – present	Incumbent. Currently a minister under Albanese

== Election results ==
2025 Australian federal election: Rankin
Party	Candidate	Votes	%	±%
Labor	Jim Chalmers	45,303	49.42	+5.47
Liberal National	Paul Darwen	18,101	19.75	−9.26
Greens	Joshua Riethmuller	10,032	10.94	+0.24
One Nation	Kyle Lentz	6,021	6.57	−1.41
Family First	Carol Ordish	3,862	4.21	+4.21
People First	Lana Hudson	3,416	3.73	+3.73
Trumpet of Patriots	Janet Lindbom	3,300	3.60	+3.60
Socialist Alliance	Alex Bainbridge	1,634	1.78	+1.78
Total formal votes		91,669	93.57	−2.54
Informal votes		6,304	6.43	+2.54
Turnout		97,973	85.23	+0.67
Two-party-preferred result
Labor	Jim Chalmers	60,092	65.55	+6.46
Liberal National	Paul Darwen	31,577	34.45	−6.46
Labor hold		Swing	+6.46	
