= Logan Road =

Road in Brisbane, Australia

Coordinates: 27°30′18.44″S 153°02′54.36″E

Logan Road Queensland
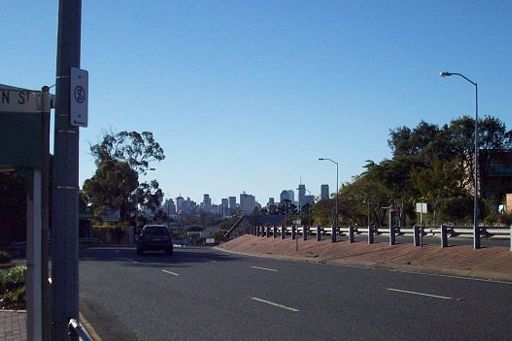
- View along Logan Road at Greenslopes

General information
- Type: Road
- Length: 18 km (11 mi)
- Route number(s): State Route 95 (Woolloongabba to Underwood); State Route 30 (Underwood to Pacific Motorway)

Major junctions
- North end: Wellington Road (State Route 95), Woolloongabba
- Old Cleveland Road (State Route 22); Marshall Road / Holland Road (State Route 10); Creek Road (State Route 20); Kessels Road / Mount Gravatt Capalaba Road (Metroad 2); Newnham Road (State Route 41); Pacific Motorway ((M3); Padstow Road / Miles Platting Road (State Route 56); Gateway Motorway ((M2); Beenleigh Road (State Route 57); Kingston Road (State Route 95); Compton Road (State Route 30); Pacific Motorway ((M3)
- South end: Rochedale Road (State Route 30), Springwood

Location(s)
- Major suburbs: Greenslopes, Holland Park, Mount Gravatt, Underwood

Logan Road, allocated state routes 95 and 30, is a major road in Brisbane, Queensland. It runs 18 kilometres (11 mi) from Springwood in Logan City to Woolloongabba in Brisbane, with most of the route signed as state route 95. The route was formerly the main route to the Gold Coast from Brisbane, until the South East Freeway (now Pacific Motorway) was built.

The road runs close to the Gabba and Greenslopes Private Hospital, Mount Gravatt, past Westfield Garden City and the Upper Mount Gravatt busway station. Logan Road provides the quickest access to Mount Gravatt from the south, as well as being the main access road for the Westfield Garden City Shopping Centre. At the road's southern extent it is crossed by both the Pacific Motorway and Gateway Motorway. At Underwood Kingston Road splits off to become a major road into central Logan City.

== History ==
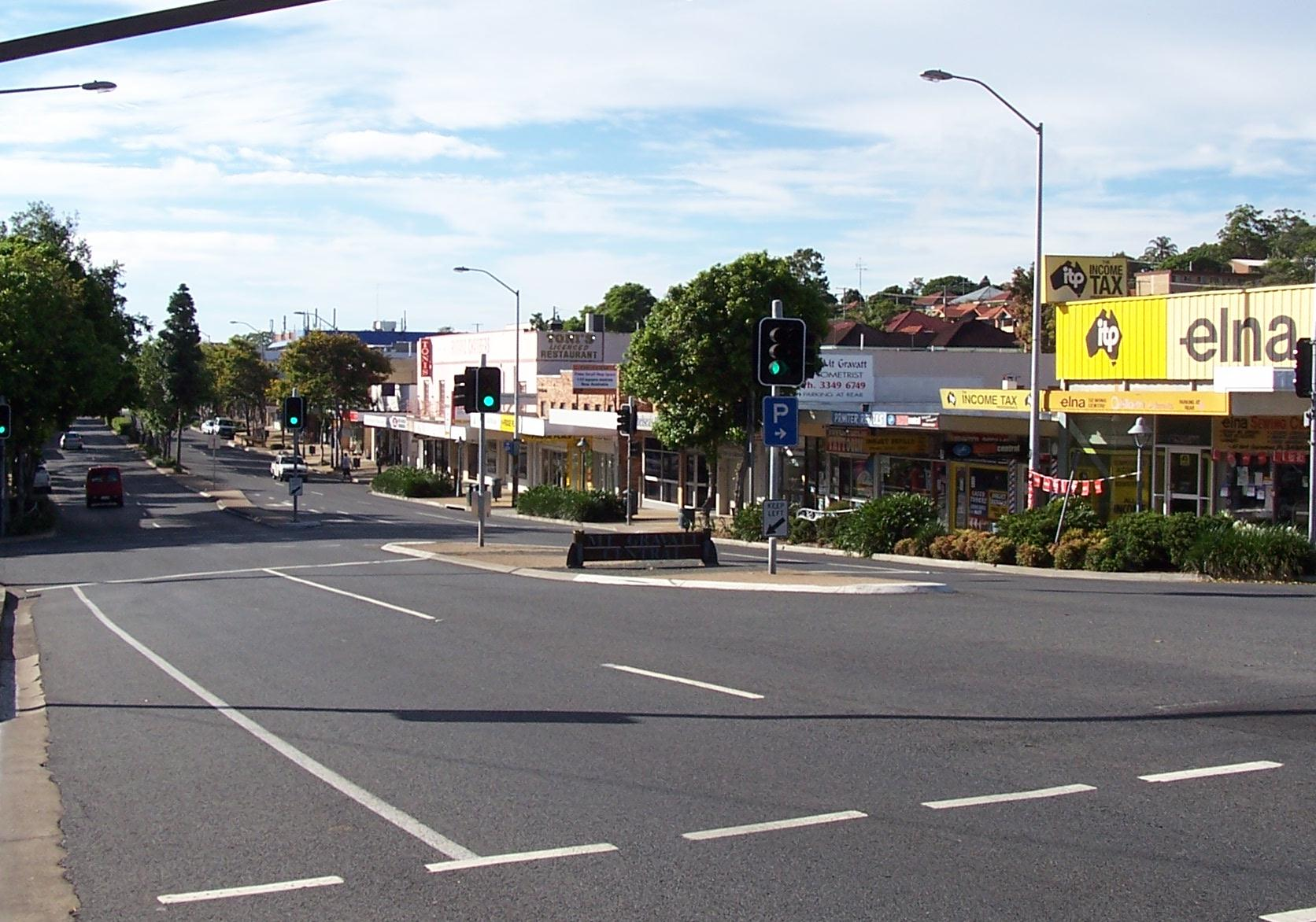
Logan Road at Mount Gravatt Central.

William Slack, a local cattle grazier, took his stock along a possible Aboriginal track which became known to the locals as Slacks Track. Later the track became a road and then highway.

The route takes its name from Captain Patrick Logan, one of the founders of the Moreton Bay convict settlement. Its route is similar to that of the Pacific Motorway and can be accessed directly via exit numbers 20 and 14 as well as by the Gateway Motorway.

The first electric trams travelled along the road in 1897. The service ran into the city to its terminus at the southern side of the Victoria Bridge. Between 1953 and 1969, electric trams ran along Logan Road between Woolloongabba and Mount Gravatt.

At the northern end of Logan Road is the Woolloongabba Fiveways. This intersection was one of the busiest in the city, requiring a policeman to coordinate rail and road traffic.

Logan Road initially ended at the Brisbane City boundary, where it became the Pacific Highway. Following the opening of the final section of the South-East Freeway (now Pacific Motorway) in 1985, it was extended to meet it at Springwood.

== Major intersections ==
The road is in the Brisbane local government area, except the last 3.3 kilometres, which are in Logan City.

Location	km	mi	Destinations	Notes
Woolloongabba	0	0.0	Dead end – no adjoining roads or streets	North–west end of Logan Road (no route number); No vehicle access between Logan Road and the Main Street / Ipswich Road / Stanley Street intersection at this location.
Woolloongabba	0.5	0.31	Wellington Road (State Route 95) – north – East Brisbane; Balaclava Street – west – Ipswich Road	Southbound traffic on Logan Road meets Wellington Road at a T junction, with no right turn towards the continuation of Logan Road. Thus traffic wishing to continue south on Logan Road must approach this intersection from one of the side streets. Logan Road continues south as State Route 95.
Woolloongabba / Greenslopes boundary	1.4	0.87	Okeefe Street – west – Ipswich Road	North-western concurrency terminus with State Route 22. Logan Road continues south-east as State Route 95, concurrent with State Route 22.
Greenslopes	1.7	1.1	Old Cleveland Road (State Route 22) – east – Coorparoo	Logan Road continues south–east with no route number. State Route 95 continues east on Old Cleveland Road, and then south on Montague Street to rejoin Logan Road.
Greenslopes	1.7	1.1		South–eastern concurrency terminus with State Route 22.
Greenslopes	2.0	1.2	Montague Street (State Route 95) – north – Old Cleveland Road	Logan Road continues south-east as State Route 95.
Holland Park / Holland Park West boundary	4.9	3.0	Marshall Road (State Route 10) – south–west – Holland Park West; Holland Road (State Route 10) – north–east – Holland Park	
Mount Gravatt / Mount Gravatt East boundary	7.5	4.7	Creek Road (State Route 20) – north–east – Mount Gravatt East	
Upper Mount Gravatt	10.0	6.2	Kessels Road (Metroad 2) – south–west – MacGregor; Mount Gravatt Capalaba Road (Metroad 2) – north–east – Wishart	
Upper Mount Gravatt / Wishart boundary	11.0	6.8	Newnham Road (State Route 41) – north – Wishart	
Eight Mile Plains	11.4	7.1	Pacific Motorway (M3) – north–west – MacGregor / south–east – Eight Mile Plains	
Eight Mile Plains	12.1	7.5	Padstow Road (State Route 56) – west – Sunnybank / Miles Platting Road (State Route 56) – east – Rochedale	
Eight Mile Plains	13.4	8.3	Gateway Motorway (M2) – south–west – Runcorn, Kuraby / north–east – Mackenzie	No exit to Gateway Motorway northbound (see next intersection)
Eight Mile Plains	13.7	8.5	Levington Road – south–west – Kuraby / north–east – Gateway Motorway	Provides an exit to Gateway Motorway northbound
Eight Mile Plains / Underwood border	14.7	9.1	Underwood Road – west – Runcorn / east – Rochedale South	Underwood Road is the boundary between the City of Brisbane and Logan City local government areas at this point. Logan Road (State Route 95) continues south into Logan City. Underwood, Rochedale South, Slacks Creek, Woodridge, and Springwood (mentioned in this and/or subsequent intersections) are in Logan City.
Underwood	16.1	10.0	Beenleigh Road (State Route 57) – west – Kuraby	
Underwood	16.4	10.2	Kingston Road (State Route 95) – south – Slacks Creek, Woodridge	Logan Road continues south–east with no route number
Underwood / Slacks Creek boundary	17.6	10.9	Compton Road (State Route 30) – south–west – Woodridge	Logan Road continues south–east as State Route 30
Underwood / Slacks Creek / Springwood boundary	17.9	11.1	Pacific Motorway (M3) – north – Underwood, Rochedale South / south – Springwood, Slacks Creek	
Springwood	18.0	11.2	Rochedale Road (State Route 30) – north – Rochedale South / Pacific Highway Service Road – south – Springwood / Fitzgerald Avenue – north–east – Springwood	South–east end of Logan Road.
1.000 mi = 1.609 km; 1.000 km = 0.621 mi: Concurrency terminus; Incomplete access; Route transition

== See also ==
- Ipswich Road
- Old Cleveland Road
- Road transport in Brisbane
