= Hughesville, Eight Mile Plains =

Hughesville
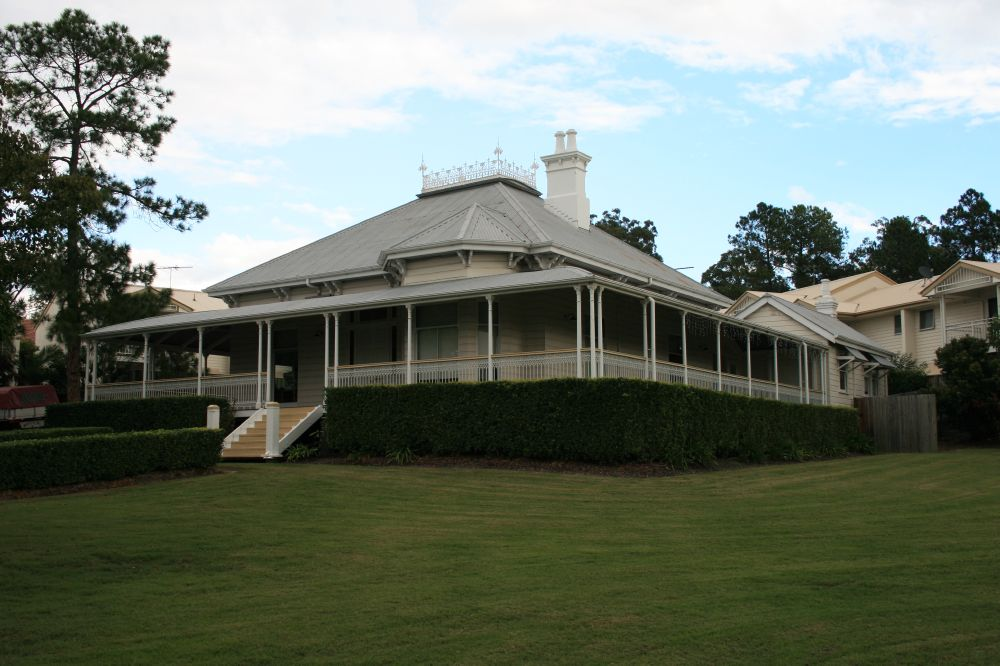
- Hughesville, 2009

- Location within Queensland Location within Australia
- 27.5763°S 153.092°E
- Location: 2497 Logan Road, Eight Mile Plains, City of Brisbane, Queensland, Australia

History
- Design period: 1870s–1890s (late 19th century)
- Built: 1892–1893

Site notes
- Architect: George Thornhill Campbell-Wilson

Queensland Heritage Register
- Official name: Hughesville
- Type: state heritage (landscape, built)
- Designated: 21 October 1992
- Reference no.: 600191
- Significant period: 1890s (fabric); 1890s–1910s (historical); 1890s– (social)
- Significant components: residential accommodation – main house, trees/plantings, kitchen/kitchen house

Hughesville is a heritage-listed detached house at 2497 Logan Road, Eight Mile Plains, City of Brisbane, Queensland, Australia. It was designed by George Thornhill Campbell-Wilson and built from 1892 to 1893. It was added to the Queensland Heritage Register on 21 October 1992.

== History ==
Hughesville, a substantial, single-storeyed timber residence, was erected in 1892–93 for Richard Alfred Hughes, a local horse-dealer, to a design by architect George Thornhill Campbell-Wilson. Reputedly, the house was a wedding gift from Alfred (Fred) Hughes to his son Richard, who married Elizabeth Magee in 1891.

Fred Hughes was a horse-dealer and livery stables keeper, resident in Brisbane from at least 1871, when he purchased land in Charlotte Street. He had established a livery stables on this site by 1874. In the mid-1880s, Hughes and his family moved to Upper Mt Gravatt, where they owned a property at the corner of Kessels and Logan Roads. He sold the Charlotte Street property in 1889, but maintained a livery stables in Adelaide Street during the first half of the 1890s. At his Upper Mount Gravatt stables, Fred Hughes bred blood stock, including Arabs.

In January 1892, his son Richard, aged 19 years, acquired title to over 8 hectares (20 acres) of land at Eight Mile Plains, just south of Upper Mt Gravatt along Logan Road. On this property Hughesville was erected, at the junction of Logan and Padstow Roads. The architect was George Thornhill Campbell-Wilson, who practised in Brisbane from 1889 to c. 1934.

George Campbell-Wilson was born in Brisbane, the eldest son of architect George William Campbell Wilson and Ada Weedon. He trained under his father and practised as an architect in Queen Street, Brisbane, from 1889 until his retirement in c. 1934.

Hughesville was arguably the finest house in the district, a farming community approximately eight miles south of the One-mile Swamp (Woolloongabba). The Eight Mile Plains had been combed by timbergetters prior to its opening as an agricultural reserve in the early 1860s. Over 7,800 acres (3,200 ha) in the nearby Coopers Plains area had been proclaimed the Brisbane Agricultural Reserve in June 1861. In October 1864, this was extended by a further 5,500 acres (2,200 ha), and the whole - encompassing what are now the suburbs of Sunnybank, Sunnybank Hills, Runcorn, Kuraby, Eight Mile Plains, and parts of Coopers Plains, Algester and Stretton - were proclaimed the Eight Mile Plains Agricultural Reserve. Fruit and some vegetable growing were the principal activities. By 1869, the area was sufficiently populated to necessitate the opening of a school at Eight Mile Plains, but the real impetus for the expansion of small farming in the district came with the opening of the extension railway from Yeerongpilly to Loganlea, in April 1885. By the time Hughesville was erected in the 1890s, Eight Mile Plains had emerged as a solid farming community.

Richard Hughes followed his father's occupation, and ran horses on the Logan Road property until 1912–13. The house remained in the Hughes family until 1994.

The house was unoccupied for some years and became increasingly derelict. Subsequently, it was restored and is now used as offices. It featured in a XXXX beer television commercial.

== Description ==
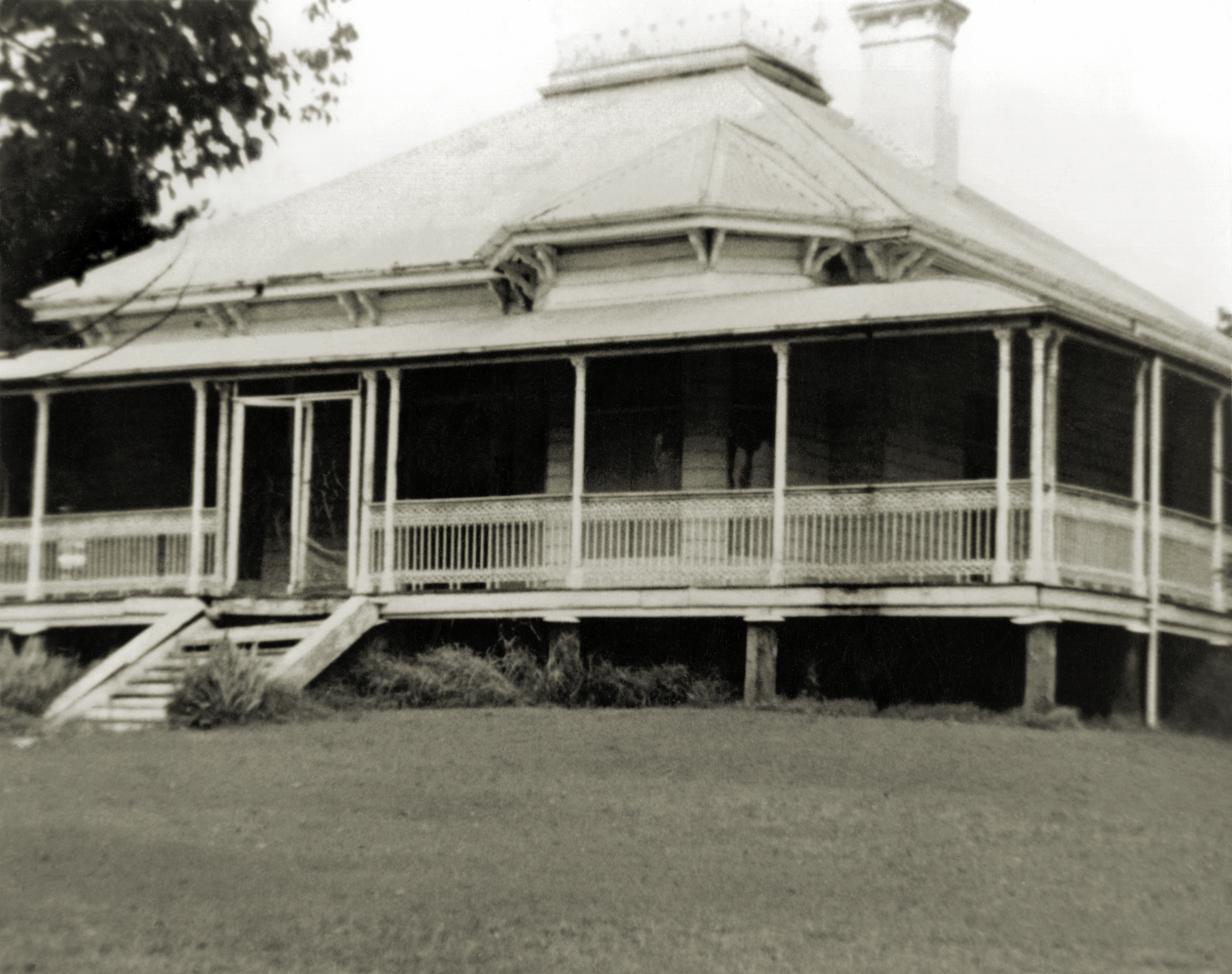
Hughesville, 1908

Hughesville stands on a grassy slope at the intersection of Logan and Padstow Roads, both of which are major arterial roads.

It is a substantial timber-framed house, clad with broad chamferboards and lined with double beaded tongue and groove boards. It sits on short wooden stumps.

The core is encircled by wide beech verandahs, with step-out sash windows opening from every room, and roofs of corrugated iron. The front and side verandahs have slender cast-iron corinthian columns, tripled at the corners, and delicate cast iron balustrading. This decoration contrasts with the square timber posts and timber balustrading (now removed) of the rear verandah.

The pyramid-shaped corrugated iron roof of the core is separated from the verandah roofs by a small cornice with paired console brackets. At the apex is a widow's walk, with cast iron cresting and corner finials.

In comparison with the exterior, the interior is functionally austere. The core comprises a wide central hallway, with front parlour and dining room to the right and three bedrooms to the left. From the parlour a faceted bay window projects onto the front verandah. At either end of the hallway are mirror-imaged front and back doorways, each with a cedar fanlight and sidelights.

Joinery throughout is of red cedar, as are the interior floorboards, with japanned edges in the main rooms. There is a cedar mantelpiece in the dining room and a grey marble mantelpiece with gilt mirror in the parlour, surrounding back-to-back fireplaces. The internal walls bear early paintwork, including a plain dado strip along the hallway.

A servant's entrance leads from the dining room to a gable-roofed timber kitchen house, with servant's room, attached to the rear verandah. It is unlined, and retains the original brick fireplace.

All that remains visible of an early garden layout are two camphor laurel trees, one on either side of the front path, and a large mango tree. Several outbuildings, including two stables, a buggy shed and harness room, are no longer extant, and less than one hectare of the original property remains.

== Heritage listing ==
Hughesville was listed on the Queensland Heritage Register on 21 October 1992 having satisfied the following criteria.

The place is important in demonstrating the evolution or pattern of Queensland's history.

Hughesville is a substantial 1890s residence which survives as illustration of a past way of life, and of a particular residential type – the quintessential Queensland house of the late colonial period.

The place is important in demonstrating the principal characteristics of a particular class of cultural places.

Hughesville is a substantial 1890s residence which survives as illustration of a past way of life, and of a particular residential type – the quintessential Queensland house of the late colonial period. It is significant for its intactness, cohesive character, aesthetic appeal and landmark position.

The place is important because of its aesthetic significance.

It is significant for its intactness, cohesive character, aesthetic appeal and landmark position.

The place has a strong or special association with a particular community or cultural group for social, cultural or spiritual reasons.

The house has a strong community association, being for many years a principal landmark along the old Pacific Highway (Logan Road) to the Gold Coast, demarking the outskirts of Brisbane.
