= Priestdale, Queensland =

Priestdale
- Suburb
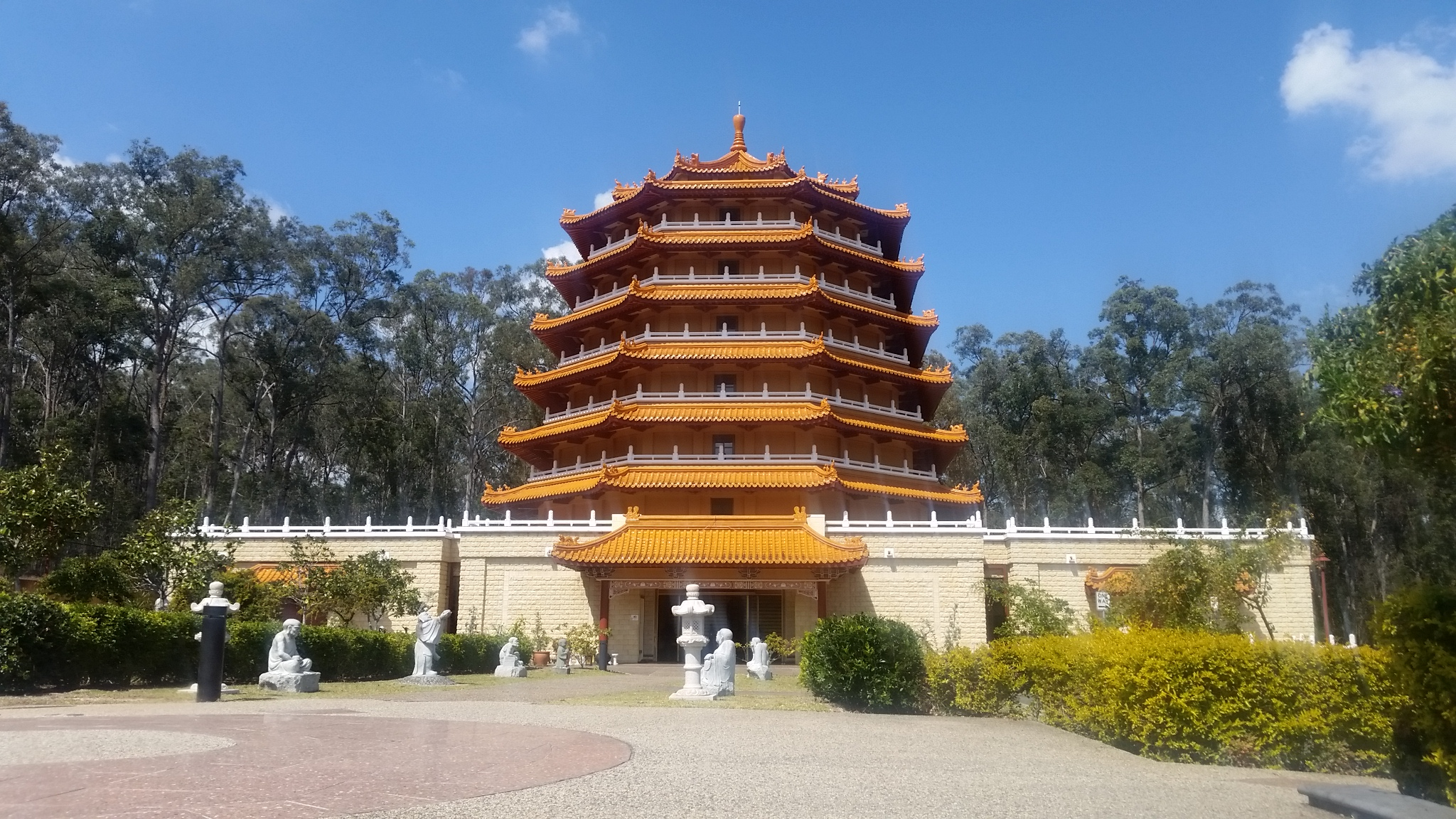
- Seven-tiered pagoda of Chung Tian Temple, 2017

- Interactive map of Priestdale
- Coordinates: 27.6077°S 153.1663°E
- Country: Australia
- State: Queensland
- City: Logan City
- LGA: Logan City
- Location: 8.5 km (5.3 mi) NW of Logan Central; 21.4 km (13.3 mi) SE of Brisbane CBD

Government
  - State electorate: Springwood
  - Federal division: Rankin

Area
  - Total: 6.8 km^{2} (2.6 sq mi)

Population
  - Total: 160 (2021 census)
  - Density: 23.5/km^{2} (60.9/sq mi)
- Time zone: UTC+10:00 (AEST)
- Postcode: 4127
Suburbs around Priestdale
Rochedale	Burbank	Burbank
Rochedale South	Priestdale	Sheldon
Springwood	Daisy Hill	Mount Cotton

Priestdale is a suburb in the north-east of the City of Logan, Queensland, Australia. In the 2021 census, Priestdale had a population of 160 people.

== Geography ==
Priestdale is bounded to the north-west by Priest Gully (a creek), to the north by Priestdale Road, and to the east by Ford Road.

The suburb is relatively undeveloped with rural residential blocks in the north and north-east. The south and west are undeveloped.

Part of the Daisy Hill Conservation Park (27.6073°S 153.1672°E) extends into the centre of the suburb. The park is a significant habitat for koalas.

== History ==
The creek Priest's Gully was named during surveys in the early 1860s but the origin of the name is unclear. In 1912 there was a pastoral property called Priestdale of 1,861 acres (753 ha) on the western branch of Tingalpa Creek. In 1916 there was a subdivision called Priestdale Lagoons which created 50 farms of 20 to 40 acres (8.1 to 16.2 ha), advertised as having good timber and ideal for farming fruit, such as pineapples, bananas, pawpaw and custard apples.

On 31 March 1979, the area was officially named and bounded as a locality by the Queensland Place Names Board. It was redesignated a suburb on 31 August 1991.

In 1992, the Chung Tian Temple (translation Middle Heaven) was built in traditional Chinese Buddhist architecture. The location was chosen for its natural bushland setting.

== Demographics ==
In the 2011 census, Priestdale had a population of 124 people, 47.6% female and 52.4% male. The median age of the Priestdale population was 43 years of age, 6 years above the Australian median of 37. 77.3% of people living in Priestdale were born in Australia. The other top responses for country of birth were South Africa 3.9%, England 2.3%, Hong Kong 2.3%, Canada 2.3%, New Zealand 2.3%. 92.8% of people spoke only English at home; the next most common language was 4.8% Mandarin.

In the 2016 census, Priestdale had a population of 136 people.

In the 2021 census, Priestdale had a population of 160 people.

== Education ==
There are no schools in Priestdale. The nearest government primary school is Rochedale South State School in neighbouring Rochedale South to the west. The nearest government secondary schools are Rochedale State High School in neighbouring Rochedale to the north-west and Springwood State High School in neighbouring Springwood to the south-west.

== Amenities ==
The Chung Tian Temple of Fo Guang Shan is 1034 Underwood Road (27.6035°S 153.1510°E). The temple is for the practice of Humanistic Buddhism (the integration of Buddhism into everyday life) and is committed to multicultural diversity and multi-faith harmony. Events and education sessions are held. There are areas for mediation and study. There is a museum, art gallery and a tea room.

There are a number of parks in the suburb, including:

- Belmore Park (27.5984°S 153.1439°E)
- Don And Christine Burnett Conservation Area (27.6181°S 153.1765°E)
- Longton Court Park (27.5941°S 153.1599°E)
- Underwood Park, 956-1028 Underwood Road (27.5999°S 153.1499°E)

Underwood Park offers a wide array of sporting facilities, picnic and BBQ areas, and a wedding venue.
