= Property Club =

Property Club Pty Ltd
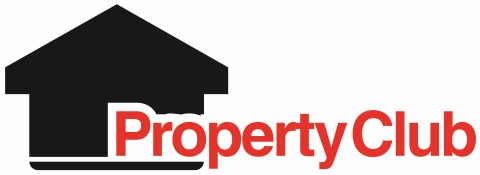
- Trade name: Property Club
- Formerly: The Investors Club
- Type: Private company
- Industry: Real estate investing
- Founded: 1994
- Founder: Kevin Young
- Headquarters: Eight Mile Plains, Australia
- Number of locations: 22 (2017)
- Number of employees: 1,000 (2017)
- Website: www.propertyclub.com.au

Property Club is an Australian property investment club headquartered in Brisbane. Property Club provides members education on property investment through seminars, workshops, conferences and mentoring, as well as assisting members to source investment properties. Property Club provides members with a support network of experienced property investors to help them create a property investment portfolio.

== History ==
Founded as the Investors Club in 1994 by Kevin Young and Kathy Young. Founder Kevin Young was a major property investors in Australian, having claimed to have bought and sold over 644 properties. Kevin is the author of the book Property, Prosper, Retire and has featured in an episode of Property Investory.

The name was later changed to the Property Club in 2014. The club currently has over 80,000 members and has assisted members in purchasing over 20,000 investment properties.

== Support ==
Property Club assists members with support, advice and at times financial aid when things go wrong, as with members Henry and Maree Schneider when they encountered an unscrupulous builder.

== Divisions ==
Property Club has several divisions including:

- Young Investors Club focusing on assisting younger real estate investors.
- Property Millionaires Club for members with more than $1 million in their portfolios.
- Club Cares a registered Australian charity where Property Club members have raised and donated over $2.1M to help people in need, including a $1M donation to the Australian Red Cross to open the Young Centre in Brisbane.
