= Rochedale South, Queensland =

Rochedale South
- Suburb
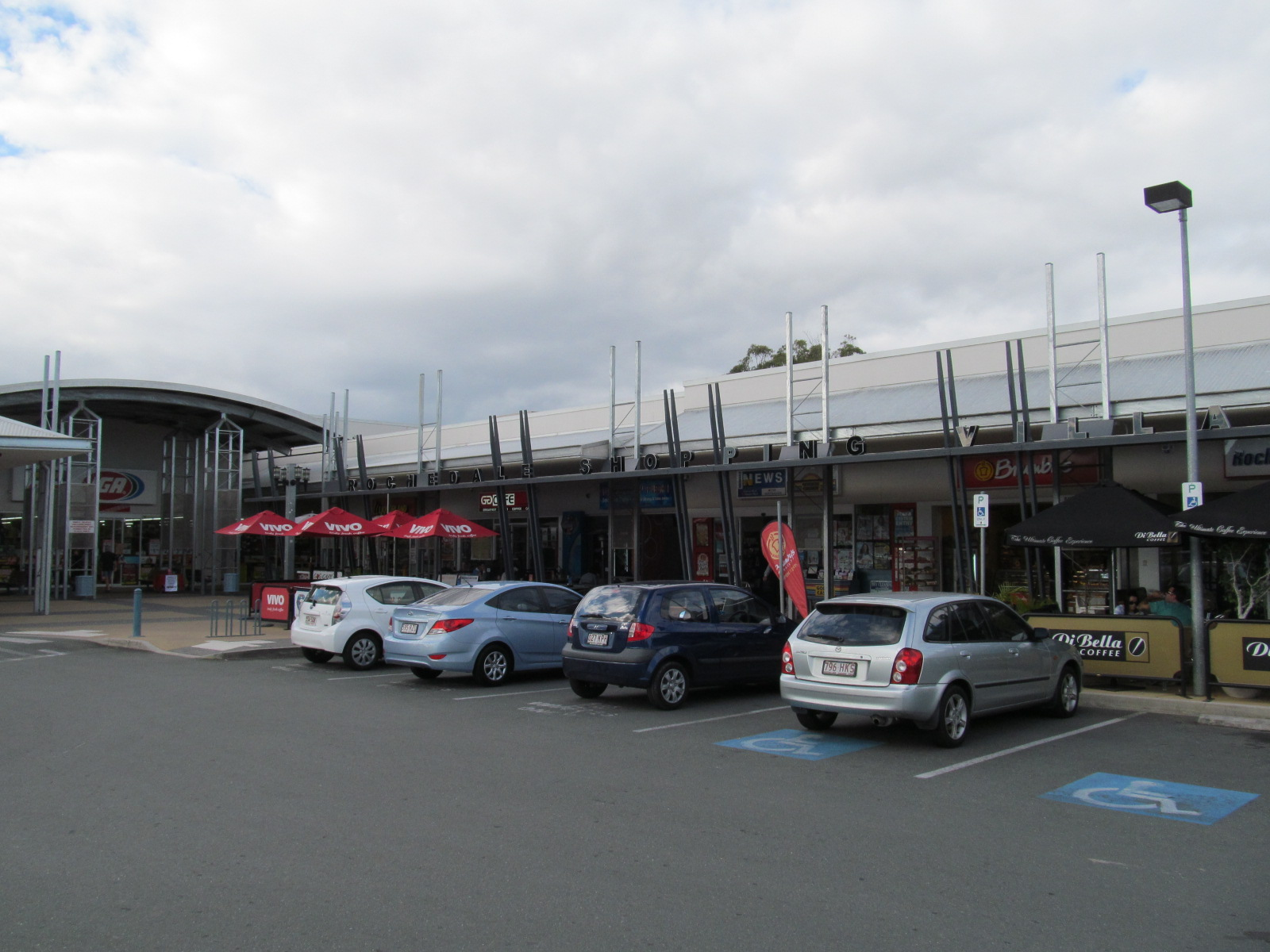
- Rochedale Shopping Village (formerly Strathlands), 2013

- Interactive map of Rochedale South
- Coordinates: 27.5991°S 153.1297°E
- Country: Australia
- State: Queensland
- City: Logan City
- LGA: Logan City
- Location: 8.1 km (5.0 mi) NNE of Logan Central; 21.7 km (13.5 mi) SW of Brisbane CBD
- Established: 1979

Government
  - State electorate: Springwood
  - Federal division: Rankin

Area
  - Total: 6.2 km^{2} (2.4 sq mi)

Population
  - Total: 15,228 (2021 census)
  - Density: 2,456/km^{2} (6,360/sq mi)
- Time zone: UTC+10:00 (AEST)
- Postcode: 4123
Suburbs around Rochedale South
Eight Mile Plains	Rochedale	Burbank
Underwood	Rochedale South	Priestdale
Underwood	Springwood	Springwood

Rochedale South is the most northern residential suburb in the City of Logan, Queensland, Australia. In the 2021 census, Rochedale South had a population of 15,228 people.

== Geography ==
Its northern boundaries of Priestdale and Underwood Road form the boundary of the City of Logan and the City of Brisbane. Part of the suburb's western boundary follows the Pacific Motorway.

In the past Rochedale was known for its rich, red soil that is good for crops. Yet due to recent years of drought in the area, much of the farming has been abandoned and are now commercialised.

It borders Rochedale, Eight Mile Plains, Priestdale, Springwood and Underwood.

== History ==
In 1952, the Gill family ran a poultry farm and piggery and in 1967 developed the land into the first sewered estate in the region. They named some of the streets after the towns and streets in England from where they originated in 1951. Some of the streets were Ridgeway Street, Green Way, Edgeware Drive Gills Close and Hindmarsh Court.

The Strathlands shopping centre opened on Underwood Road (27.5966°S 153.1248°E) in 1970 but was later renamed Rochedale Shopping Village. A number of churches were established in the following decades as the population of the suburb expanded with estate developments.

The suburb was named and bounded on 1 August 1979, when it was split off from the larger Rochedale. The name Rochedale refers to the homestead built by the Roche family who settled in the area in 1868. The family farmed grapes and citrus fruits in the 1870s. The name Rochedale has been used since the 1880s.

Springwood Road State School opened on 29 January 1974.

Rochedale South State School opened on 30 January 1979.

== Demographics ==
In the 2011 census, Rochedale South recorded a population of 14,996 people, 51.3% female and 48.7% male. The median age of the Rochedale South population was 35 years, 2 years below the national median of 37. 71.9% of people living in Rochedale South were born in Australia. The other top responses for country of birth were New Zealand 6.5%, England 4.3%, South Africa 1.1%, India 0.6%, Fiji 0.6%. 86.1% of people spoke only English at home; the next most common languages were 0.9% Cantonese, 0.9% Mandarin, 0.6% Arabic, 0.5% Hindi, 0.4% Greek.

In the 2016 census, Rochedale South had a population of 15,317 people. The "average" person in Rochedale South would be a 36-year-old female, married with 1.8 children, living in a mortgaged 3 bed house with 2 cars. She would be employed full time in a professional role holding a bachelor's degree and travel to work by car. She would be born in Australia of English heritage, but not religious.

In the 2021 census, Rochedale South had a population of 15,228 people.

== Education ==
Springwood Road State School is a government primary (Prep–6) school for boys and girls at 94-120 Springwood Road (27.6081°S 153.1292°E). In 2017, the school had an enrolment of 586 students with 46 teachers (39 full-time equivalent) and 30 non-teaching staff (20 full-time equivalent). It includes a special education program.

Rochedale South State School is a government primary (Prep–6) school for boys and girls at Wendron Street (27.5906°S 153.1298°E). In 2017, the school had an enrolment of 463 students with 37 teachers (31 full-time equivalent) and 24 non-teaching staff (15 full-time equivalent). It includes a special education program.

There are no secondary schools in Rochedale South. The nearest government secondary schools are Rochedale State High School and Redeemer Lutheran College (a non-state school) in Rochedale, approximately 1 km (0.62 mi) north, and Springwood State High School in Springwood, on the southern boundary.

== Sports ==
Rochedale is home to the 2010 Brisbane Premier League champions, Rochedale Rovers Football Club. They play out of Underwood Park, Priestdale.

== Projected population ==
The projected population from 2016 census is as follows:

2016 15,984

2021 16,740 (4.5% increase from 2016)

2026 16,896 (0.9% increase from 2021)

2031 16,977 (0.5% increase from 2026)

2036 17,129 (0.9% increase from 2031)

2041 17,259 (0.8% increase from 2036)

== Transport ==
Rochedale South is adjacent the Pacific Highway (Brisbane/Gold Coast Highway) and in close proximity to the Gateway Motorway, and Southeast Freeway.

The closest bus stations are in adjacent suburbs. Springwood and Eight Mile Plains (South East Busway).

Rochedale Bus Station is due to open May 2025, linking to Eight Miles Plains and Brisbane CBD to the north and Springwood to the south

The closest train station is in Kuraby, 4 km west.
