= Estelle Thomson =

Australian naturalist and botanical artist

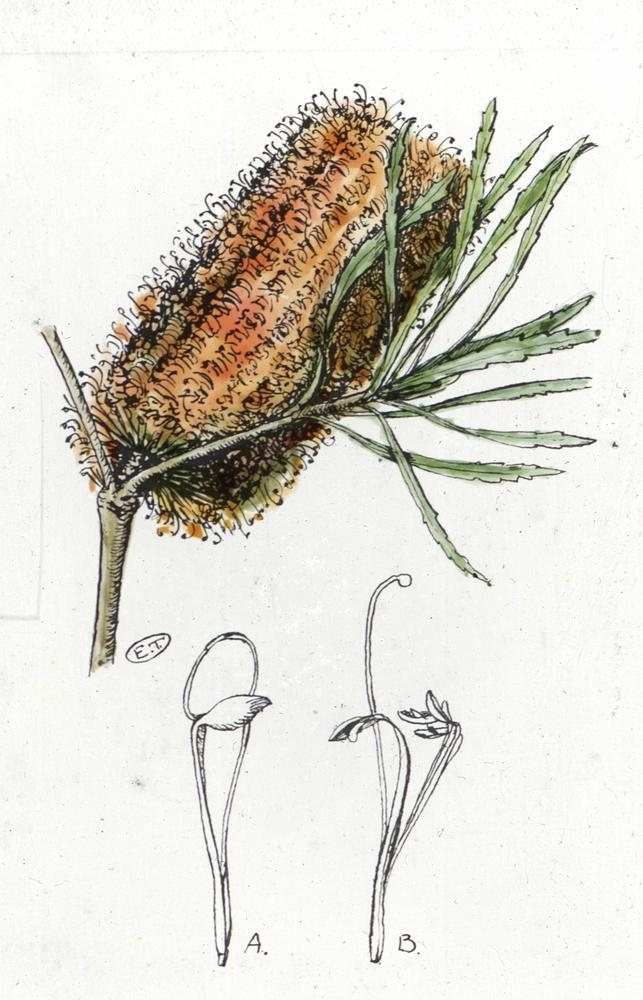
Banksia spinulosa var. collina, illustrated by Estelle Thomson, 1929

Estelle Thomson (née Comrie-Smith) (1894 – 6 September 1953) was an Australian naturalist and botanical artist. She authored a number of books, compiled a weekly newspaper column, and gave talks on the radio about Australian wildflowers.

== Early life in Scotland ==
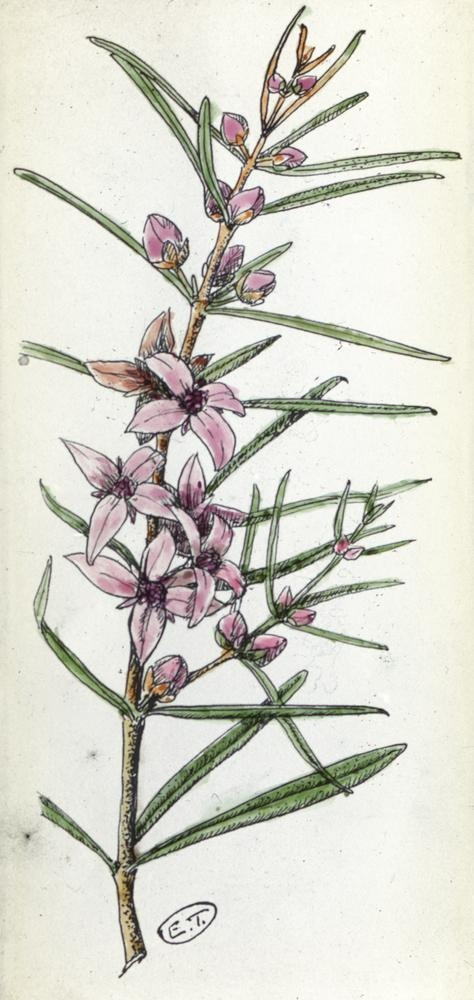
Brisbane boronia, illustrated by Estelle Thomson, 1929

Estelle Comrie-Smith was born in 1894 in Glasgow, Scotland, daughter of photographer and artist, George Comrie-Smith and his wife Ethel (née Thomson). Her parents were naturalists and inspired Estelle's interest through family holidays to the Scottish Highlands and the Lake District. She attended Calder House School at Seascale, Cumberland, England and later studied physical culture in Dartford, Kent, after which she taught physical culture and eurhythmics. In 1917 in Glasgow, she married her second cousin Aubrey Frederick Thomson (who renounced his former surname, von Stieglitz, in favour of his mother's maiden name Thomson on 6 December 1917), a surveyor, who was then serving in the Australian Imperial Forces during World War I.

== Australian naturalist ==
In 1919, after her husband was released from his military service, the couple came to Australia where they established a farm, Wombo, at Eight Mile Plains in Queensland, where they raised chickens and crops until the venture failed in 1923. During this period, Thomson developed an appreciation of Australian wildflowers, resulting in her becoming an active member of the Queensland Naturalists' Club from the 1920s. Despite raising four children, she found the time to paint and draw for the club's wildflower shows. She was vice-president of the club in 1929–1930 and president in 1930–1931.

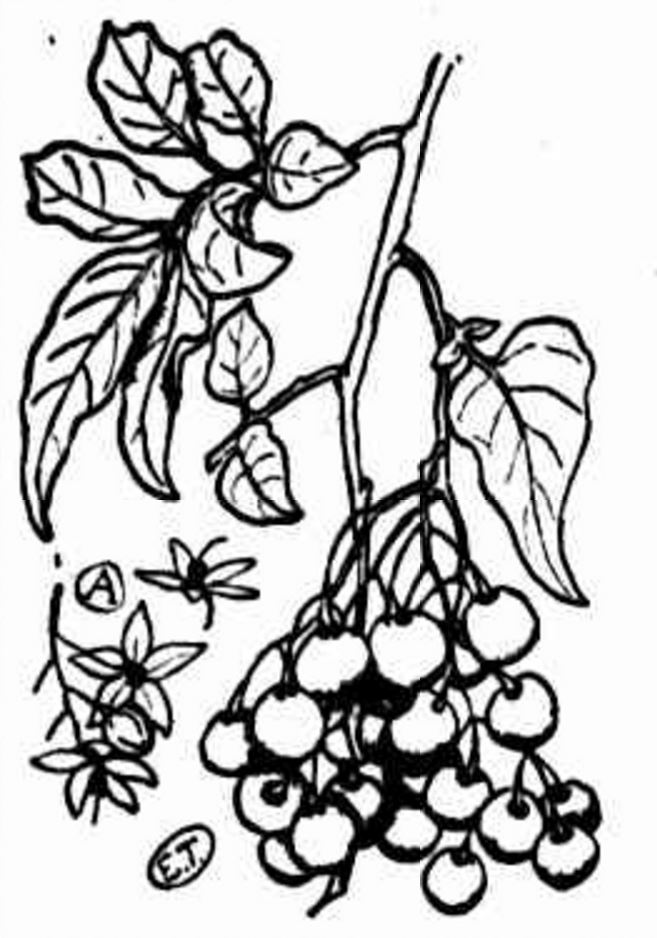
Solanum seaforthianum (deadly nightshade), illustrated by Estelle Thomson in her 15 June 1929 newspaper column

Starting in 1929, she published a number of books about Australian wildflowers with her own illustrations. She also wrote weekly newspaper columns for the Brisbane Courier and Telegraph newspapers from 1929 to 1950. In the 1940s she gave talks on the Australian Broadcasting Commission radio as well as at clubs and schools.

From 1939 to 1942, Thomson prepared a Register of Drawings of Poisonous Plants of Queensland for the Department of Social and Tropical Medicine at the University of Queensland. She also collected specimens for the Queensland Herbarium, run by her friend and Queensland Government Botanist C. T. White.

== Later life ==
Thomson died on 6 September 1953 in Brisbane from heart disease. She was cremated at Mount Thompson crematorium on 8 September 1953.

== Legacy ==
The State Library of Queensland has digitised Estelle Thomson's lantern slides which she used to illustrate her talks.

== List of published works ==
- Thomson, Estelle (1929), Flowers of our bush, Read Press
- Honey, W. H. (William Henry); Thomson, Estelle (1940), Bush loveliness, W.H. Honey Publishing
