= Des O'Reilly =

Australian rugby league footballer

Personal information
- Full name: Desmond Charles O'Reilly
- Born: 19 November 1954 Bondi, New South Wales, Australia
- Died: 7 March 2016 (aged 61) Eight Mile Plains, Queensland, Australia

Playing information
- Position: Utility forward
Club
Years	Team	Pld	T	G	FG	P
1975–82	Eastern Suburbs	127	17	0	0	51
1983–85	Cronulla	13	0	0	0	0
	Total	140	17	0	0	51
Representative
Years	Team	Pld	T	G	FG	P
1981	N.S.W.	1	0	0	0	0
- Source: As of 8 March 2016

Des O'Reilly (19 November 1954 – 7 March 2016) was an Australian rugby league footballer who made 127 appearances for the Eastern Suburbs Roosters from 1975 to 1982, and then 13 appearances for Cronulla from 1983 to 1985.

O'Reilly died on the morning of 7 March 2016 after a long illness.
