= Kuraby =

- Suburb
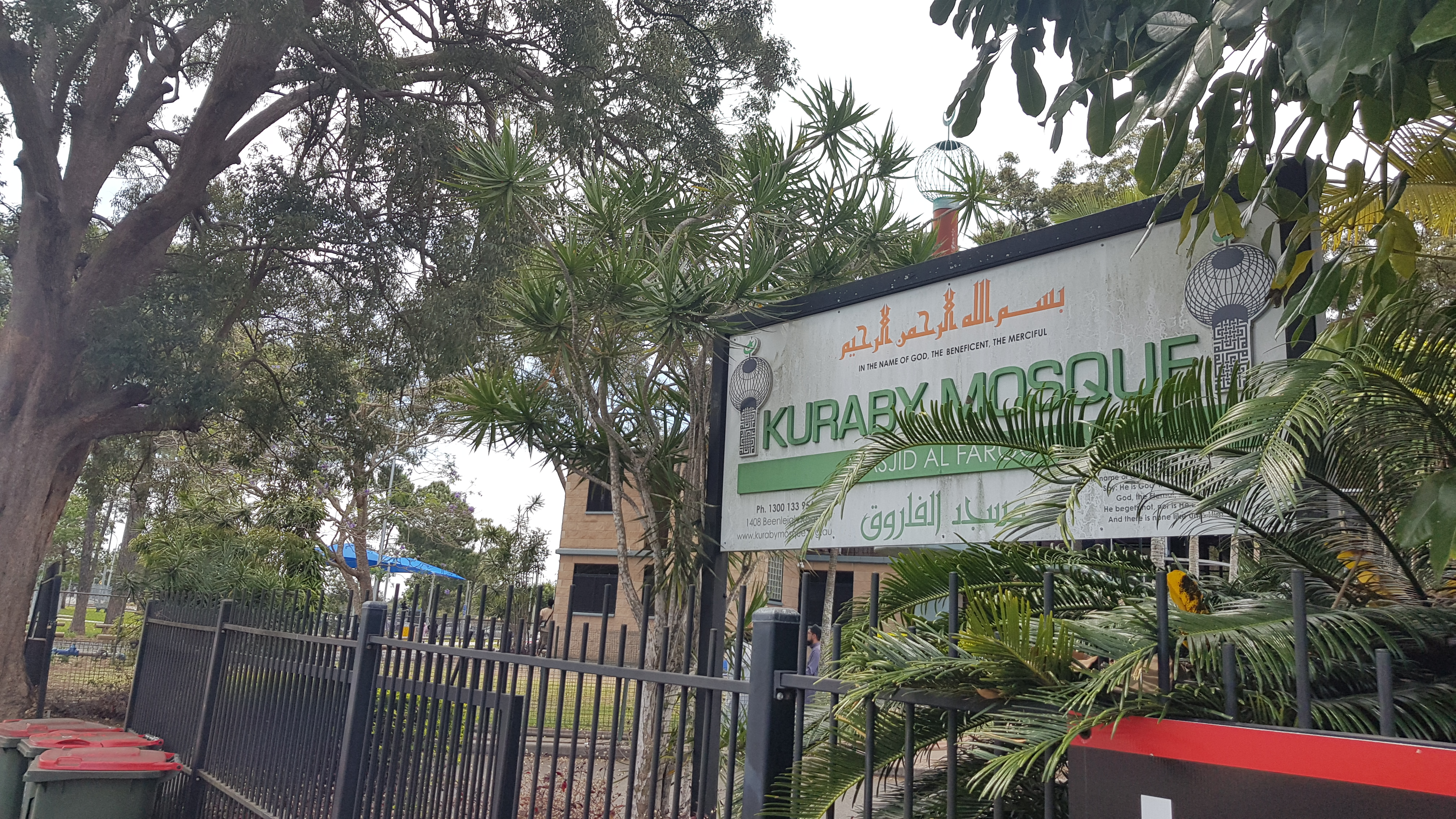
- Kuraby Mosque, 2022

- Interactive map of Kuraby
- Coordinates: 27.6080°S 153.0913°E
- Country: Australia
- State: Queensland
- City: Brisbane
- LGA: City of Brisbane (Runcorn Ward)
- Location: 2.0 km (1.2 mi) SE of Runcorn; 6.4 km (4.0 mi) WSW of Rochedale; 19.5 km (12.1 mi) SSE of Brisbane CBD

Government
  - State electorate: Stretton
  - Federal division: Moreton

Area
  - Total: 4.5 km^{2} (1.7 sq mi)

Population
  - Total: 8,737 (2021 census)
  - Density: 1,942/km^{2} (5,030/sq mi)
- Time zone: UTC+10:00 (AEST)
- Postcode: 4112
Suburbs around Kuraby
| Runcorn | Eight Mile Plains | Eight Mile Plains |
| Runcorn | Kuraby | Underwood |
| Stretton | Karawatha | Woodridge |

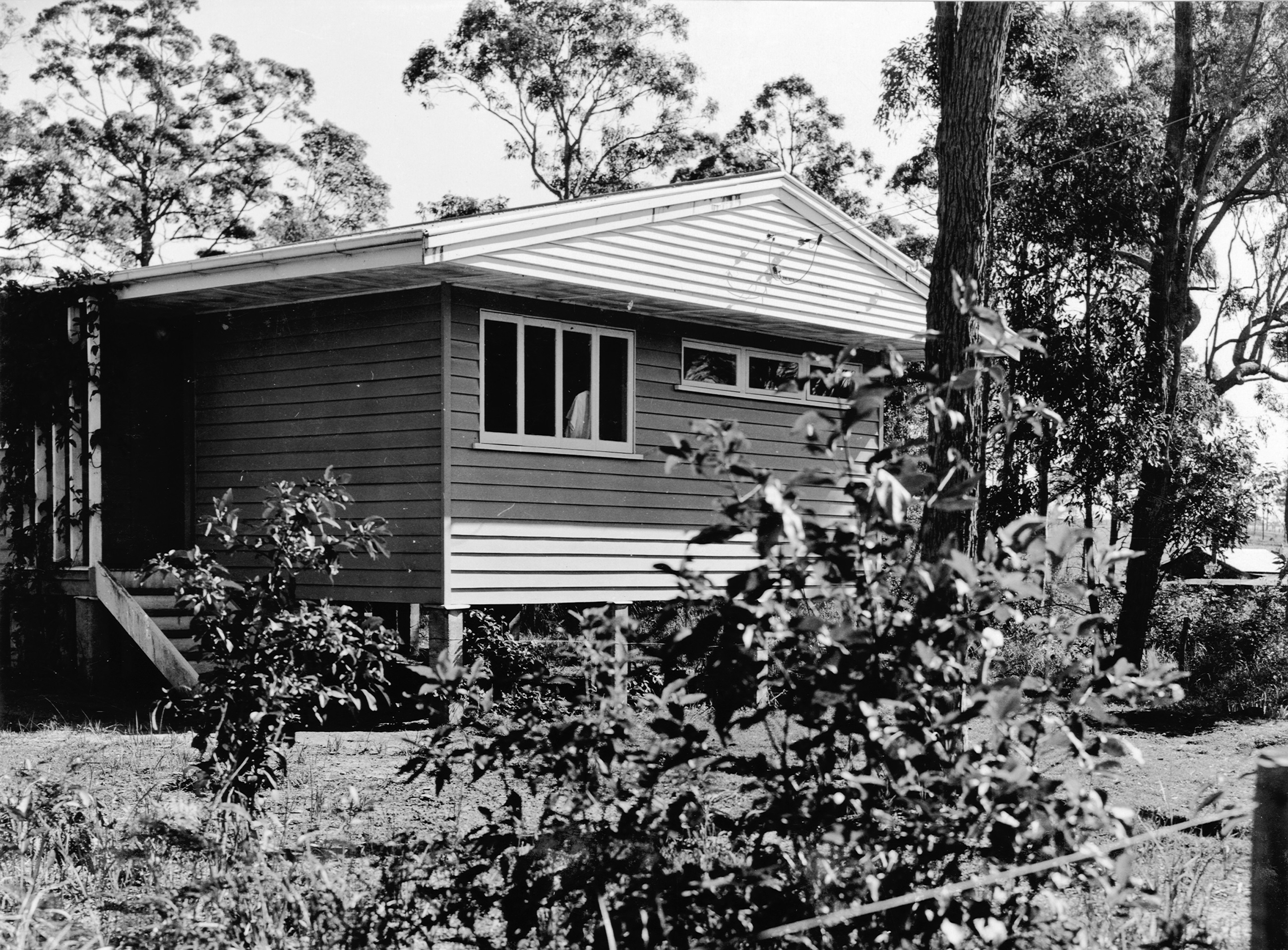
Kuraby home circa 1954

Kuraby is an outer southern suburb in the City of Brisbane, Queensland, Australia. In the 2021 census, Kuraby had a population of 8,737 people.

== Geography ==
Kuraby is situated approximately 16 kilometres (9.9 mi) by road south-east of the city of Brisbane.

Beenleigh Road is the main road connecting the suburb to the motorways leading to the city and further parts of Brisbane and beyond. Kuraby is serviced by a fast electric train service to Brisbane city and the Gold Coast, whilst a bus service takes commuters to the large shopping centres of Upper Mount Gravatt and Springwood.

== History ==
The name "Kuraby" was officially gazetted on 16 August 1975 and derives from the local railway station name first used by the Railway Department in 1889, having previously been Spring Creek railway station. The name "Kuraby" refers to a creek near the railway station. Originally the name came from an aboriginal word meaning "a place of many springs".

The area of Kuraby was once known as Eight Miles Plains. Charles Baker was granted a Publican's Licence on 12 December 1865. The modern Glen Hotel now stands there. This was where Cobb & Co changed horses and the passengers were refreshed before continuing their journey to Beenleigh and further south.

The settlement of Kuraby began in 1860, when the Hollosons and Bakers cleared land and commenced farming. However, it was the opening of the Kuraby rail station on the South Coast railway line in 1885 that the name Kuraby came to be used (in preference to Eight Mile Plains or Spring Creek, the name then used to distinguish the area from Eight Mile Plains). The Spring Creek Township was advertised for sale in 1887 with 151 lots available.

The Duke and Duchess of York opened the new Parliament House, Canberra, in 1927. Four years later they toured Australia, and in the middle of their hectic schedule, one night's rest was arranged. The Royal Train was brought to the passing loop at Kuraby station and kept securely there with its pilot train. The timetable was re-arranged to enable them to have an un-interrupted evening. This event put the name of Kuraby on the map.

Kuraby State School was opened in 1928 and is situated within bushland surrounds.

St John's Anglican Church at 1410 Beenleigh Road (27.6059°S 153.0934°E) was dedicated on 19 June 1960 by Archbishop Reginald Halse. It closed circa 1989. It was purchased in the early 1990s by the Islamic community and converted it into Kuraby Mosque.

Kuraby Special School opened in 1978.

On 21 September 2001, ten days after the 9/11 terrorist attacks, the Kuraby Mosque was the subject of an arson attack, the first mosque in the world to be attacked as a consequence of the terrorist attacks. The mosque was rebuilt.

As at 2019, there is little evidence of agriculture as housing estates occupy the former farm land.

== Demographics ==
In the 2011 census, Kuraby had a population of 7,777 people, 51.4% female and 48.6% male. The median age of the Kuraby population was 33 years of age, 4 years below the Australian median. 50.8% of people living in Kuraby were born in Australia, compared to the national average of 69.8%; the next most common countries of birth were India 4%, New Zealand 3.8%, South Africa 3.5%, China 2.6%, England 2.2%. 54.1% of people spoke only English at home; the next most common languages were 5.3% Mandarin, 5% Arabic, 4.1% Cantonese, 2.3% Hindi, 1.9% Urdu.

In the 2016 census, Kuraby had a population of 8,108 people.

In the 2021 census, Kuraby had a population of 8,737 people. 45.4% of people living in Kuraby were born in Australia, compared to the national average of 66.9%; the next most common countries of birth were India 6.2%, Mainland China 5.2%, Pakistan 4.7%, South Africa 3.3% and New Zealand 2.6%. 41.7% of people spoke only English at home; the next most common languages were 9.9% Mandarin, 7.7% Urdu, 4.9% Arabic, 4.3% Cantonese and 3.8% Punjabi. The main ancestral background of residents were Chinese 16.3%, English 15%, Australian 14.5%, Indian 12.2% and Pakistani 6%. The main religions were Islam 32%, No religion 23.5%, Catholic 10.5%, Not stated 4.2% and Anglican 4%.

== Education ==
Kuraby State School is a government primary (Prep–6) school for boys and girls at 1523 Beenleigh Road (27.6068°S 153.0962°E). In 2017, the school had an enrolment of 457 students with 35 teachers (29 full-time equivalent) and 24 non-teaching staff (14 full-time equivalent). It includes a special education program.

Kuraby Special School is a special primary and secondary (Prep–12) school for boys and girls at 83 Alpita Street (27.6062°S 153.0913°E). In 2017, the school had an enrolment of 70 students with 20 teachers (17 full-time equivalent) and 34 non-teaching staff (19 full-time equivalent).

There are no secondary schools in Kuraby. The nearest government secondary schools are Runcorn State High School in neighbouring Runcorn to the west and Rochedale State High School in Rochedale to the north-east.

== Culture ==
Kuraby has a diverse population mix of old and young. Some of the older residents can trace their families back to the early settlement of the area. A number of the local streets now bear their name.

Many nationalities from different parts of the world now call Kuraby home. The Muslim community has a mosque in Kuraby (27.6059°S 153.0935°E) while there is a Buddhist temple situated in a nearby suburb. Many other religions have their place of worship either in the suburb or in the surrounding suburbs. According to the 2021 census, Kuraby has the largest Muslim community of any suburb in Queensland, numbering 2,813 individuals and making up 31.2% of the suburb's population.

Young families are attracted to Kuraby as it has many facilities to cater for them. Several doctors and a chemist have set up business in Kuraby to cater for the health needs of the population. Kuraby has its own community centre (the infrastructure is owned by the local council) and is run by a volunteer committee of local people who are responsible for seeing that the building is maintained and improvements are implemented.

== Transport ==
Kuraby railway station provides access to regular Queensland Rail City network services to Brisbane and Beenleigh.
