= Underwood, Queensland =

Underwood
- Suburb
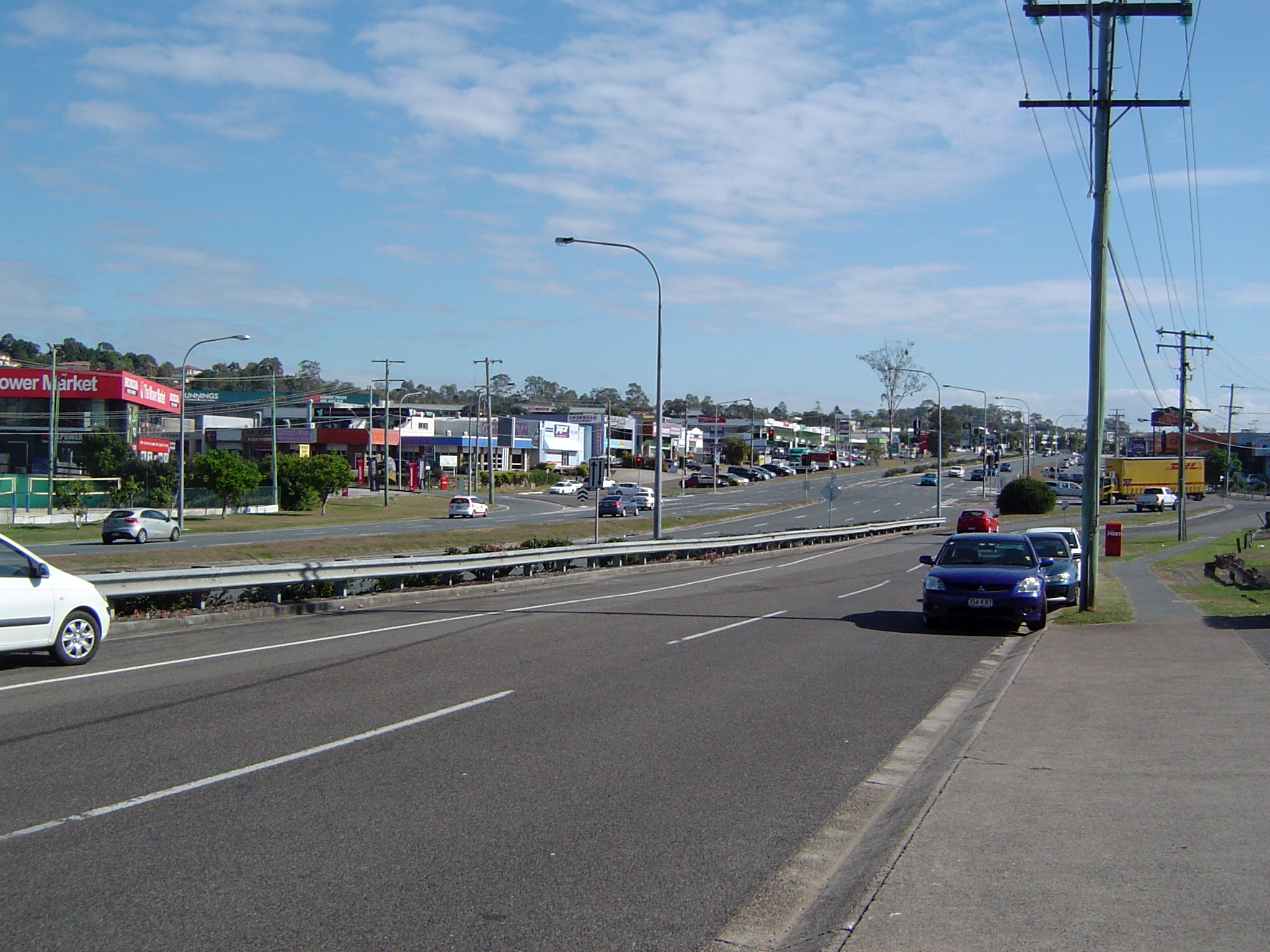
- Logan Road, 2014

- Interactive map of Underwood
- Coordinates: 27.6069°S 153.1127°E
- Country: Australia
- State: Queensland
- City: Logan City
- LGA: Logan City
- Location: 4.6 km (2.9 mi) N of Logan Central; 21.2 km (13.2 mi) SSE of Brisbane CBD

Government
  - State electorate: Waterford
  - Federal division: Rankin

Area
  - Total: 4.2 km^{2} (1.6 sq mi)

Population
  - Total: 6,809 (2021 census)
  - Density: 1,621/km^{2} (4,200/sq mi)
- Time zone: UTC+10:00 (AEST)
- Postcode: 4119
Suburbs around Underwood
Eight Mile Plains	Rochedale	Rochedale South
Kuraby	Underwood	Springwood
Woodridge	Woodridge	Slacks Creek

Underwood is a suburb in the City of Logan, Queensland, Australia. In the 2021 census, Underwood had a population of 6,809 people.

== Geography ==
It is located 18 km south-east of central Brisbane; the Logan Motorway has made Underwood's boundary. Compton Road is the suburbs southern boundary.

== History ==
Underwood is situated in the Yugarabul traditional Indigenous Australian country of the Brisbane and surrounding regions. Towards the south-east of Underwood towards Beenleigh is the Bundjalung traditional Aboriginal country.

The origin of the suburb name is from William Underwood, who was an early property owner in the area. William Underwood had established the Commercial Hotel, which operated from the early 1870s through to 1895 on land nearby Beenleigh Road. The suburb Underwood was gazetted on 11 August 1975 and was part of both Brisbane City Council and the former Shire of Albert before the creation of Logan City in the year 1978. In 1993, the sections of Underwood and Kuraby bounded by Underwood, Logan, Kingston, Compton and Millers Roads were transferred from the City of Brisbane to Logan.

== Demographics ==
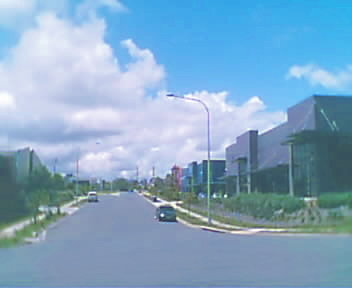
Graham Street

In the 2011 census, Underwood had a population of 5,328 people, 49.9% female and 50.1% male. The median age of the Underwood population was 32 years, 5 years below the national median of 37. 59.6% of people living in Underwood were born in Australia. The other top responses for country of birth were New Zealand 6.3%, China (excludes Special Administrative Regions and Taiwan) 2.3%, England 2.2%, South Africa 1.9% and Korea, Republic of (South) 1.8%. 67.7% of people spoke only English at home; the next most common languages were 4.5% Mandarin, 3.0% Cantonese, 2.2% Korean, 1.7% Arabic and 1.4% Hindi.

In the 2016 census, Underwood had a population of 6,341 people. Of these, 50.5% were female and 49.5% were male. The median age of the Underwood population was 33 years, 5 years below the national median of 38. 51.2% of people living in Underwood were born in Australia. The other top responses for country of birth were China 4.7%, India 4.5%, New Zealand 4.3%, Korea, Republic of (South) 3%, Taiwan 2.4%. 54.3% of people spoke only English at home; the next most common languages were 8.1% Mandarin, 3.7% Korean, 3.7% Cantonese, 3.5% Punjabi, 2.3% Arabic..

In the 2021 census, Underwood had a population of 6,809 people, 49.5% female and 50.5% male. The median age of the Underwood population was 34 years, 4 years below the national median of 38. 50.7% of people living in Underwood were born in Australia. The other top responses for country of birth were India 6.6%, China 4.1%, Korea 3.9%, New Zealand 3.6%, Taiwan 2.1%. 50.0% of people spoke only English at home; the next most common languages were 7.8% Mandarin, 6.1% Punjabi, 4.9% Korean, 3.8% Cantonese, and 2.4% Hindi. The main religions were No religion, so described 30%, Islam 15.6%, Catholic 10.9%, Not stated 6.3% and Sikhism 4.8%.

== Education ==
There are no schools in Underwood. The nearest government primary schools are Eight Mile Plains State School in neighbouring Eight Mile Plains to the north-west, Springwood Road State School in neighbouring Rochedale South to the north-east, and Kuraby State School in neighbouring Kuraby to the west. The nearest government secondary schools are Rochedale State High School in neighbouring Rochedale to the north, Springwood State High School in neighbouring Springwood to the east, and Runcorn State High School in Runcorn to the west.

== Amenities ==
Operated by Logan City Council Libraries, the Logan North branch Library opened in 2008 and is located on the corner of Sports Drive and Springwood Road, Underwood. Public WiFi is available.

== Transport ==
Underwood is accessible by road from the Pacific Motorway (M1). Public transport is available via the Springwood Busway Station along the South East Busway. The nearest train stations are the Kuraby Railway Station in the adjacent suburb of Kuraby, and Trinder Park Railway Station in the adjacent suburb of Woodridge.
