= Eight Mile Plains =

- Suburb
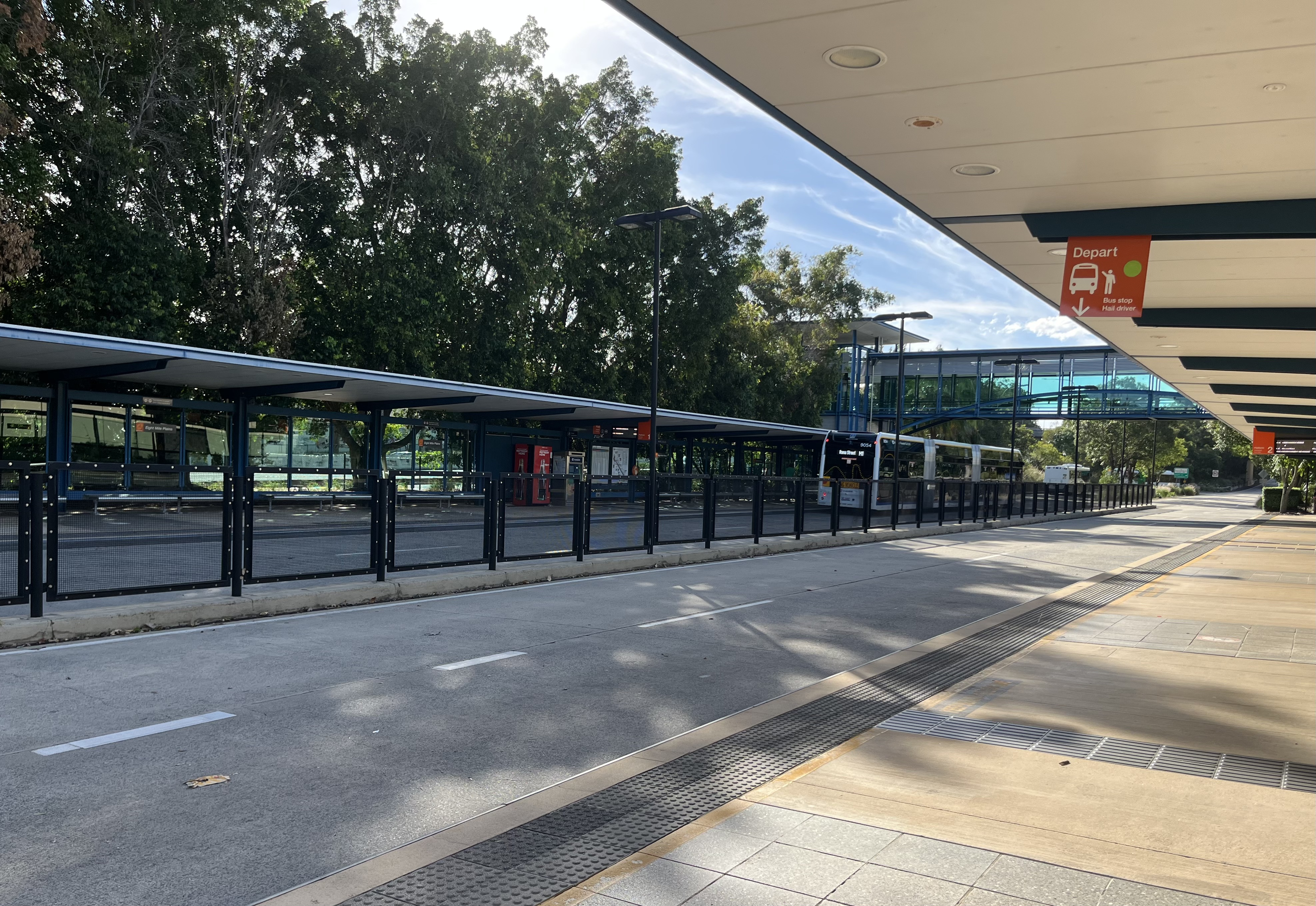
- Eight Mile Plains busway station

- Interactive map of Eight Mile Plains
- Coordinates: 27.5816°S 153.0952°E
- Country: Australia
- State: Queensland
- City: Brisbane
- LGA: City of Brisbane (MacGregor Ward)
- Location: 14.9 km (9.3 mi) SSE of Brisbane CBD
- Established: 1864

Government
  - State electorates: Toohey; Stretton
  - Federal divisions: Moreton; Bonner

Area
  - Total: 7.8 km^{2} (3.0 sq mi)

Population
  - Total: 15,326 (2021 census)
  - Density: 1,965/km^{2} (5,090/sq mi)
- Time zone: UTC+10:00 (AEST)
- Postcode: 4113
Suburbs around Eight Mile Plains
Macgregor; Upper Mount Gravatt	Wishart	Rochedale
Sunnybank	Eight Mile Plains	Rochedale
Runcorn	Kuraby	Underwood; Rochedale South

Eight Mile Plains is an outer southern suburb in the City of Brisbane, Queensland, Australia. In the 2021 census, Eight Mile Plains had a population of 15,326 people.

== Geography ==
Eight Mile Plains is 14.9 kilometres (9.3 mi) by road south-southeast of the Brisbane CBD.

Bulimba Creek forms the northern and western boundary of the suburb. The Gateway Motorway forms the north-eastern boundary and the Pacific Motorway forms the south-eastern boundary.

Brisbane Technology Park is on the corner of Logan Road and Miles Platting Road (27.5772°S 153.0945°E). It is an initiative of the Queensland Government developed to provide an environment for established and emerging knowledge-intensive, technology-based companies.

== History ==
The name of the Aboriginal clan formerly occupying this area is uncertain. According to one source they are likely to have been the Chepara clan of Eight Mile Plains who spoke Turrbal. The Yerongpan of Oxley Creek are said to have claimed the area from Brisbane to Ipswich. Another source claims they were the Yagarabal, who ranged from Brisbane to the Logan River and west to Moggill Creek. The original custodians used a trail which later became Logan Road. This trail bisected many creeks including the Mimosa Creek and Bulimba Creek watercourse.

The name Eight Mile Plains was given early in its settlement, and refers to the area's flat topography and the distance (8 miles (13 km)) to One Mile Swamp (now Woolloongabba).

In 1861, over 7,800 acres (32 km^{2}) in the nearby Coopers Plains area had been proclaimed the Brisbane Agricultural Reserve. In 1864 this was extended by a further 5,500 acres (22 km^{2}) and the Eight Mile Plains Agricultural Reserve was formed. It comprised the current suburbs of Sunnybank, Sunnybank Hills, Runcorn, Kuraby, Eight Mile Plains and parts of Coopers Plains, Algester and Stretton.

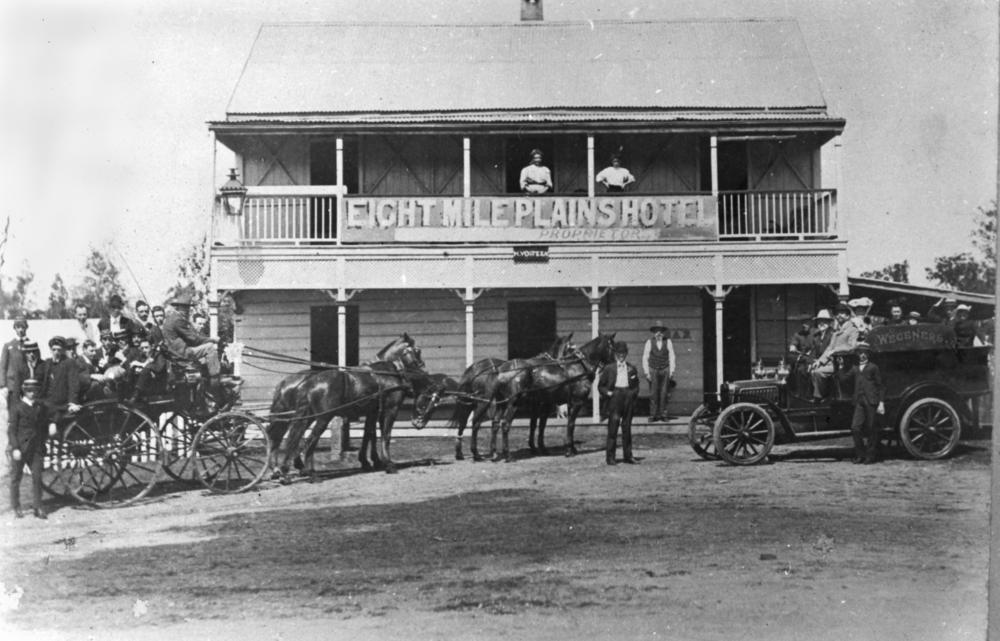
Eight Mile Plains Hotel, circa 1905 (now The Glen Hotel)

Charles Baker bought land in the area in 1863. He obtained a publican's licence for Baker's Hotel on 12 December 1865. Joseph Baker took over the licence in 1869 and changed the name to Eight Mile Plains Hotel. In 1875 the hotel became a Cobb & Co staging post. In 1927, two Scottish sisters Mary-Jane McCamey and Emma O’Sullivan took over the hotel and changed its name to "The Glen", because the undulating countryside reminded them of the area in Scotland where they were born. The O'Sullivan family introduced wood chopping competitions at the hotel, including a cross saw event with one end being taken by a woman (known today as a Jack and Jill competition). These events attracted huge crowds and led to the formation of the Queensland Axeman's Association which continues to operate wood chopping competitions throughout Queensland and send teams to national and international events. As at 2019, The Glen Hotel continues to trade, making it one of the longest continuously trading hotels in Queensland.

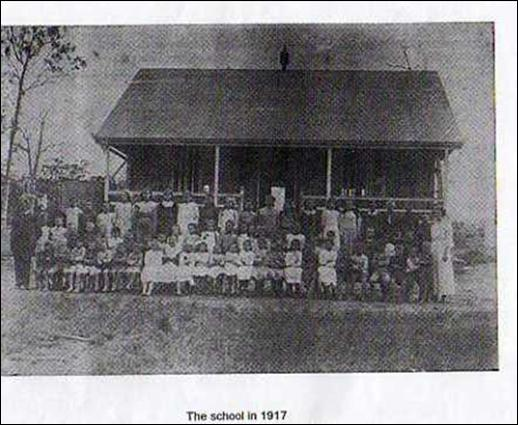
Eight Mile Plains State School, 1917

The Eight Mile Plains Provisional School opened on 7 June 1869 in Charles Baker's paddock on Logan Road between Levington Road and the Glen Hotel. The school building was erected by Baker at his own expense. There were approximately 15 students at that time. However, the school was poorly located on the outskirts of the area and the building was in poor condition and by 1875 there was local agitation for a new building to house the 80 students in a more central location. In June 1880, tenders were called to erect a new school building made of hardwood. In 1896, it became Eight Mile Plains State School. In 1958, the school relocated to its current site with a new school building.

In September 1883, 231 allotments of "Logan Railway Estate" were advertised to be auctioned by John Cameron. A map advertising the auction illustrates the proximity of the estate to the Logan Railway Line.

Between 1902 and 1904, the Anglican, Catholic, Lutheran and Methodist communities in the area decided to construct a church on Millers Road that would be shared between them with each denomination holding their services in the church according to a roster until such time as each denomination established its own church. This arrangement continued until it was only the Anglican faith still using the building, when it then became St Paul's Anglican Church.

Electricity was extended to the district in 1936.

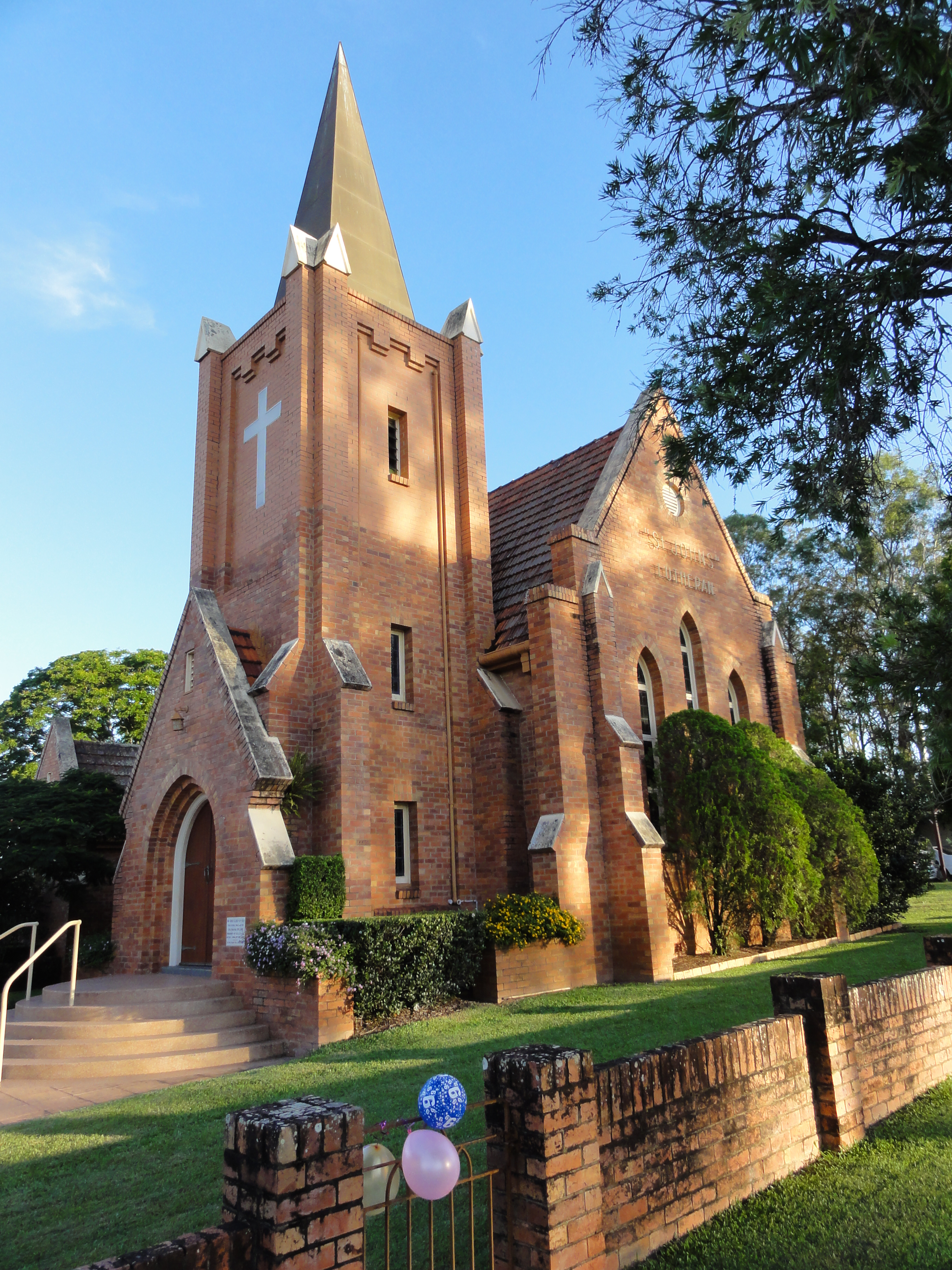
St Johns Lutheran Church, 2013

St Johns Lutheran Church was officially dedicated on Sunday 9 December 1951 by Pastor M. Lohe, president of the Lutheran Church in Queensland. The brick church was built entirely by the volunteer labour of 30 men of the congregation with the work starting in October 1949 and mostly done on Saturdays. Pastor Lohe laid the foundation stone on 2 April 1950. The church had seating for 150 people with a further 50 people in the separate choir loft. The church was designed by farmer Reg Waldman who also supervised the construction; he was also the church's organist. The building was not complete at the time of its dedication as the tower has only reached 27 feet (8.2 m) but the plans were for it to reach 50 feet (15 m) including a belfry. The building was completed in 1976 with the erection of the spire.

Warrigal Road State School opened on 30 January 1979. The word Warrigal means "Dingo" in the local Aboriginal language.

Originally Eight Mile Plains extended beyond the Brisbane City boundary along the Pacific Highway (Logan Road) into the northern part of Albert Shire (now Logan City). In the 1970s, this southern part of Eight Mile Plains, along with the southern part of Rochedale and Springwood became the new suburb of Underwood. Part of Eight Mile Plains within the Brisbane boundary was renamed Rochedale.

In 1973, the Multiple Handicapped Association of Queensland (now known as Multicap) established a facility for children with multiple disabilities at 303 Padstow Road. On 25 August 1980, the Queensland Government established the Eight Mile Plains Special School on the site to manage the education aspects of the facility (27.5766°S 153.0898°E). The school closed on 31 December 1997.

Brisbane Technology Park opened in 1986. The park is located on a 33.5-hectare (83-acre) site that is only 12 minutes from the Brisbane CBD. The Queensland Clunies Ross Centre for Science and Industry opened at the Technology Park in 1997.

In 1988, the Brisbane Sikh Temple was built on Logan Road followed by the Bosnian Mosque in 2014 showing the growing diversity of Eight Mile Plains.

In October 2014, a petition was made by 380 residents to excise the north-eastern part of Eight Miles Plains bounded by the Pacific Motorway and Bulimba Creek to create a new suburb to be called Wishart Outlook, the name given to the area by its developers in the 1990s. However, other residents are opposed to the change.

== Demographics ==
In the 2016 census, Eight Mile Plains recorded a population of 15,322 people, 50.5% female and 49.5% male. The median age of the Eight Mile Plains population was 34 years of age, 4 years below the Australian median. 43.4% of people living in Eight Mile Plains were born in Australia, compared to the national average of 66.7%; the next most common countries of birth were China 12.2%, Republic of Korea 6.4%, Taiwan 4.9%, India 5.3% and New Zealand 3.1%. 42.7% of people spoke only English at home; the next most popular languages were 19.1% Mandarin, 7.3% Korean, 6.3% Cantonese, 3.1% Punjabi, 1.6% Hindi. Eight Mile Plains includes the largest Korean Australian community of any suburb in Queensland, numbering 1,150 individuals and making up 6.1% of the suburb's population.

In the 2021 census, Eight Mile Plains had a population of 15,326 people. 43.9% of people living in Eight Mile Plains were born in Australia, compared to the national average of 66.9%; the next most common countries of birth were mainland China 11.7%, India 6.7%, Taiwan 4.7%, Korea, Republic of (South) 4.7% and New Zealand 2.8%. 40.6% of people spoke only English at home; the next most popular languages were 19.5% Mandarin, 6.1% Cantonese, 5.6% Korean, 4.5% Punjabi, 1.7% Gujarati. The main ancestral origins of residents were Chinese 28.3%, English 17.5%, Australian 14.8%, Indian 7.9% and Korean 6%. The main religions were No religion, so described 36.8%, Catholic 12.7%, Buddhism 5.4%, Hinduism 5.1% and Not stated 5.1%.

== Heritage listings ==
Eight Mile Plains has a number of heritage-listed sites, including:

- St Johns Lutheran Church, 24 Levington Road
- Hughesville, 2497 Logan Road
- United Protestant Church, 17 Millers Road

=== Hughesville ===
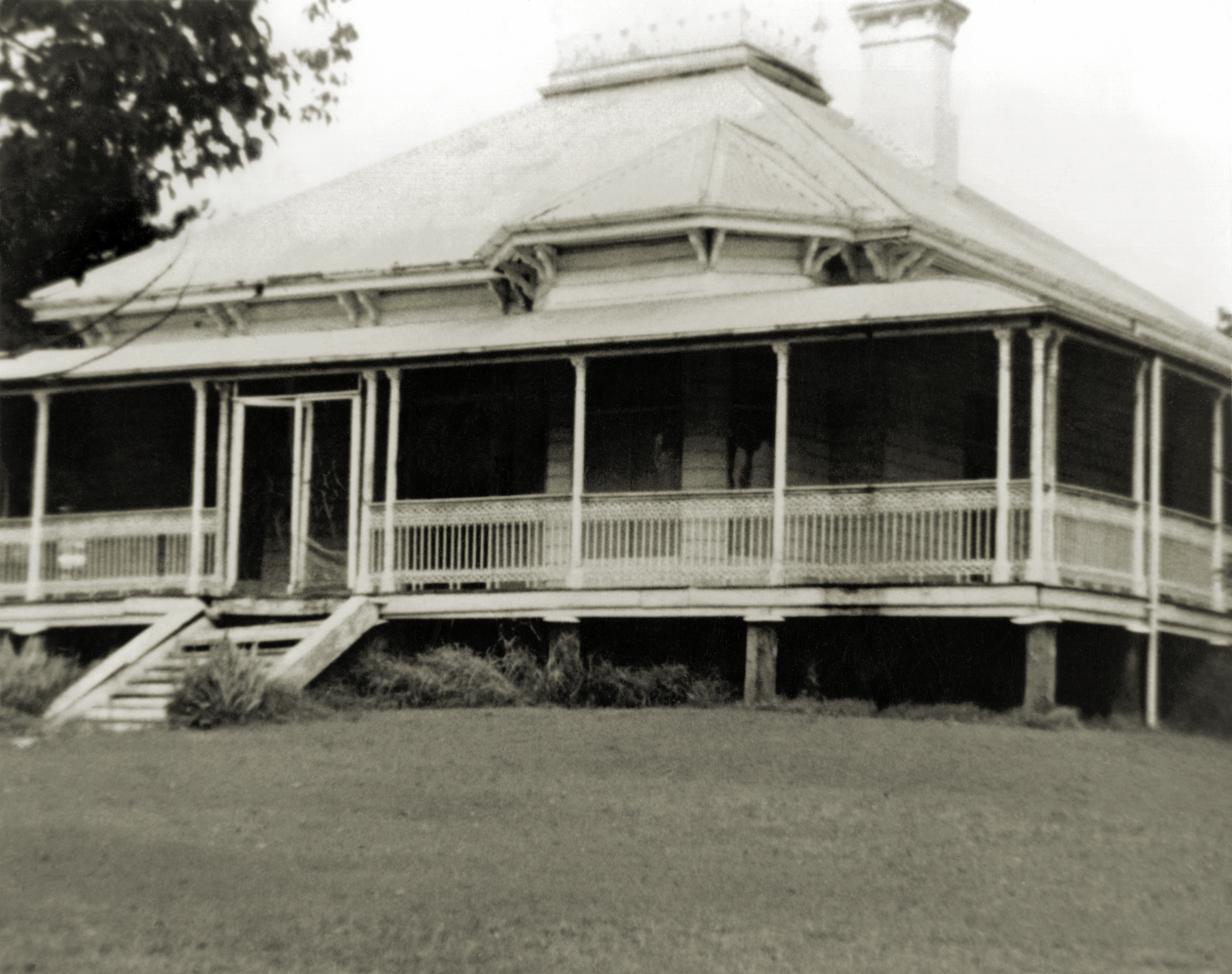
Hughesville, 1908

Hughesville is the heritage-listed residence located on the corner of Logan and Padstow Road. The timber single-storied home was erected in 1892–93 by Alfred (Fred) Hughes (a local horse dealer) on land owned by Richard Hughes and reputedly given to this son, Richard, as a wedding gift when he married Elizabeth Magee in 1891. Hughesville survives as illustration of a past way of life, and of a particular residential type - the quintessential Queensland house of the late colonial period. It is significant for its intactness, cohesive character, aesthetic appeal and landmark position. The house has a strong community association, being for many years a principal landmark along the old Pacific Highway to the Gold Coast, demarcating the outskirts of Brisbane. In the late 1990s, it was used in one of the beer advertisements in Queensland. The land has now been subdivided and a few townhouses have been built behind the house. The house itself has been converted into a business establishment. Hughesville was listed on the Queensland Heritage Register in 1992.

== Education ==
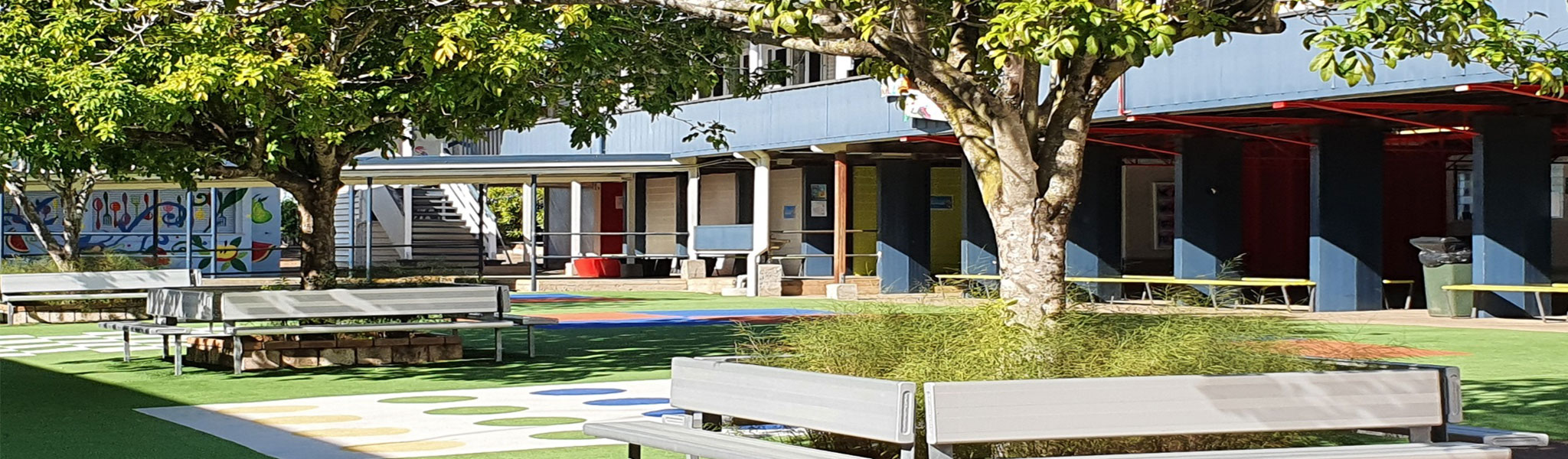
Eight Mile Plains State School, 2024

Eight Mile Plains State School is a government primary (Prep–6) school for boys and girls at 480 Underwood Road (27.5935°S 153.1090°E). In 2017, the school had an enrolment of 271 students with 30 teachers (25 full-time equivalent) and 21 non-teaching staff (14 full-time equivalent). It includes a special education program.

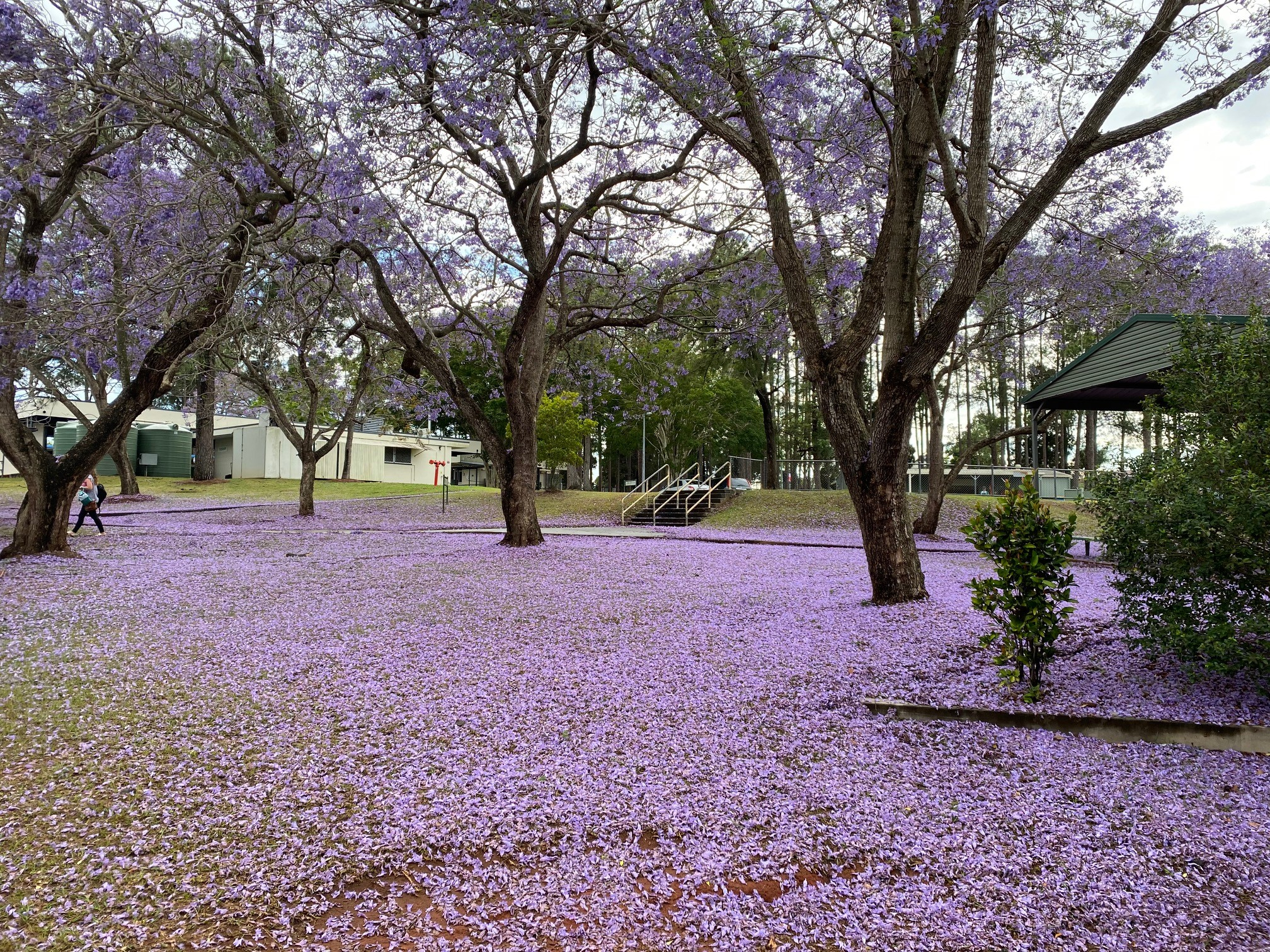
Warrigal Road State School, 2024

Warrigal Road State School is a government primary (Prep–6) school for boys and girls at 314 Warrigal Road (27.5870°S 153.0853°E). In 2017, the school had an enrolment of 1283 students with 91 teachers (80 full-time equivalent) and 55 non-teaching staff (34 full-time equivalent). It includes a special education program.

There are no secondary schools in Eight Mile Plains. The nearest government secondary schools are Runcorn State High School in neighbouring Runcorn to the south-west, Sunnybank State High School in neighbouring Sunnybank to the west, MacGregor State High School in neighbouring MacGregor to the north-west, and Rochedale State High School in neighbouring Rochedale to the east.

== Transport ==
Eight Mile Plains is connected to Brisbane CBD and Gold Coast and by the Pacific Motorway and to the Sunshine Coast via the Gateway Motorway. It is connected to the Translink public transport network via Eight Mile Plains busway station on the South-East Busway.

== Notable residents ==
- Des O'Reilly, rugby league footballer who won the 1975 NSWRFL premiership with the Eastern Suburbs Roosters.
- Estelle Thomson, naturalist and botanical illustrator.
- Kym Tollenaere, Australian softball catcher.
- Graham Quirk, Brisbane Lord Mayor from 2011 to 2019.

== See also ==
- Eight Mile Plains busway station
