= Lorna Jane Clarkson =

Australian fashion designer, entrepreneur, and author

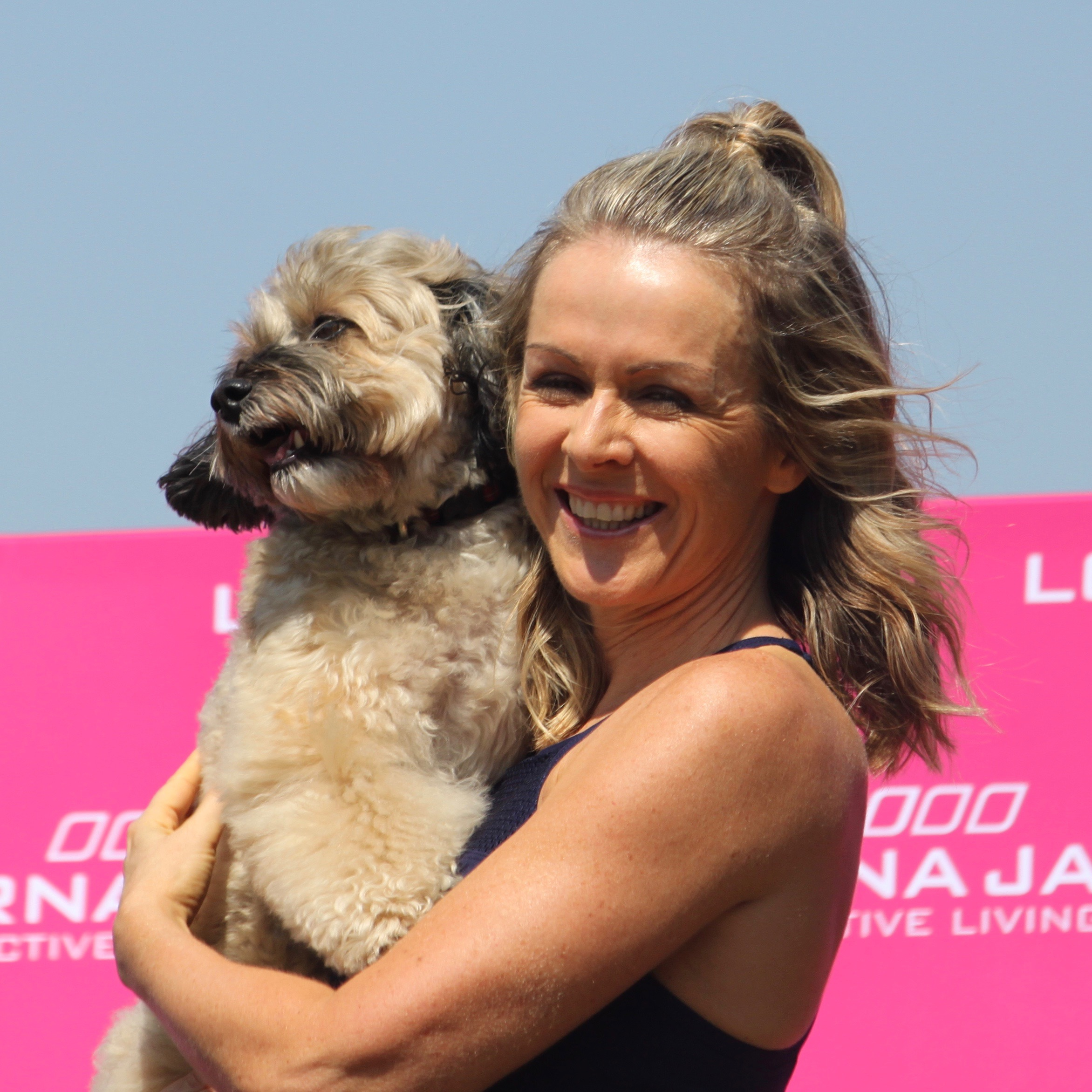
- Clarkson with her pet moodle, Roger
- Born: Lorna Jane Smith; 24 November 1964 (age 61); Lancashire, England
- Occupations: Entrepreneur, Fashion Designer, Author, Advocate for women's health and wellbeing
- Spouse: Bill Clarkson

Lorna Jane Clarkson (née Smith, born 24 November 1964) is an Australian entrepreneur, fashion designer, and author. In 1989 she founded Lorna Jane, the Australian women’s activewear brand, where she continues to work as Chief Creative Officer.

Credited with creating the activewear category in Australia, Clarkson has been a public figure in Australian business and wellness culture since the founding of Lorna Jane. Clarkson has authored six books on health and wellbeing and since February 2025 has hosted the Never Give Up vodcast.

== Early life ==
Clarkson was born Lorna Jane Smith in Lancashire, England, the younger of two sisters. The family emigrated to Brisbane, Australia, when Lorna was ten years old. As a child, she learned ballet, played netball, and was a school cheerleader. She attended Springwood State High School, and as a teenager, worked at Mathers shoe store in Woodridge Plaza. She wanted to become a journalist after high school, inspired by Australian journalist Jana Wendt, but deferred her university course by a year and trained instead as a dental therapist. While studying dental therapy, Smith began teaching aerobics at night.

After graduation, she worked for Queensland Health, and was posted to Cairns, where she provided dental care in schools. During her time in Cairns, Smith ran her first marathon, was crowned Miss Cairns, and met her future husband, Bill Clarkson. Smith continued to teach aerobics before and after work, conducting up to 13 classes per week, with up to 50 or 60 students per class. She also worked a third job, baking sugar-free cakes and vegetable frittatas for local cafes.

== Career ==
As a fitness instructor, Smith found a lack of appealing clothes in which to work and started to sew her own. She had no formal training in garment production, but had been interested in fashion since a teenager, crocheting bikinis from age 16, customising her clothes from age 18, and from age 21 starting to design and make her own clothes. She began by unpicking a favourite swimsuit and used it to make a pattern out of newspaper, providing the basis for her first leotard design. In her telling, she began making outfits for her students after receiving requests.

At the age of 24, she returned to Brisbane and continued teaching aerobics, now to classes of hundreds of students. She also continued sewing activewear for herself and on request. In later interviews, Smith described enjoying producing activewear so much that she decided to give up instructing and make it her full-time occupation. In 1989, the owner of the gym at which she worked offered her space for a studio above the gym, and also casual work as a receptionist if she needed extra money. Her mother lent her money to fund increasing production, and to help her with her rent and costs of living.

At the time, fashionable activewear was not understood as a concept by major brands. When her husband showed the products to the department store Myer, their fashion buyers were uninterested and unsure of how to position the garments, not understanding their request to not sell them in the sports section. Eventually, Myer bought a small range for five of their stores and stocked it between swimwear and lingerie. According to The Lorna Jane corporate website and some features, Smith should be credited with coining the word "activewear" in 1989, although the Merriam-Webster dictionary notes the word's first known usage was in 1924. (Note: Consider this example from Collier's Illustrated Weekly in 1936: "She winces a little when anyone refers to her chosen work as 'the bathing-suit business.' What Mrs. Schnurer designs, as her stationery accurately announces, is Activewear for Beach and Play." — Case Harriman, Margaret (1936). "Shock-Proof Lady". Collier's Illustrated Weekly. Vol. 97. Crowell-Collier Publishing Company. p. 32.)

Deciding to retail the Lorna Jane label themselves, in 1990, Smith and Clarkson opened their first store, in an upper floor of Brisbane's Broadway on the Mall shopping centre. The products sold quickly: the business covered its first week of rent with its first day of sales, and in 1991, a customer bought the entire stock of the second Lorna Jane store in a single purchase of $25,000 with the intention of reselling it. The story of Clarkson riding back to Smith's workshop on a bicycle with $25,000 cash in a bag has become a famous anecdote about the early successes of the business.

After establishing the Lorna Jane business, Clarkson studied fashion at TAFE college and was awarded a Diploma of Fashion. She later said that, in hindsight, earning this qualification was unnecessary because of the practical experience she had already gained. In 1994, Smith married Clarkson.

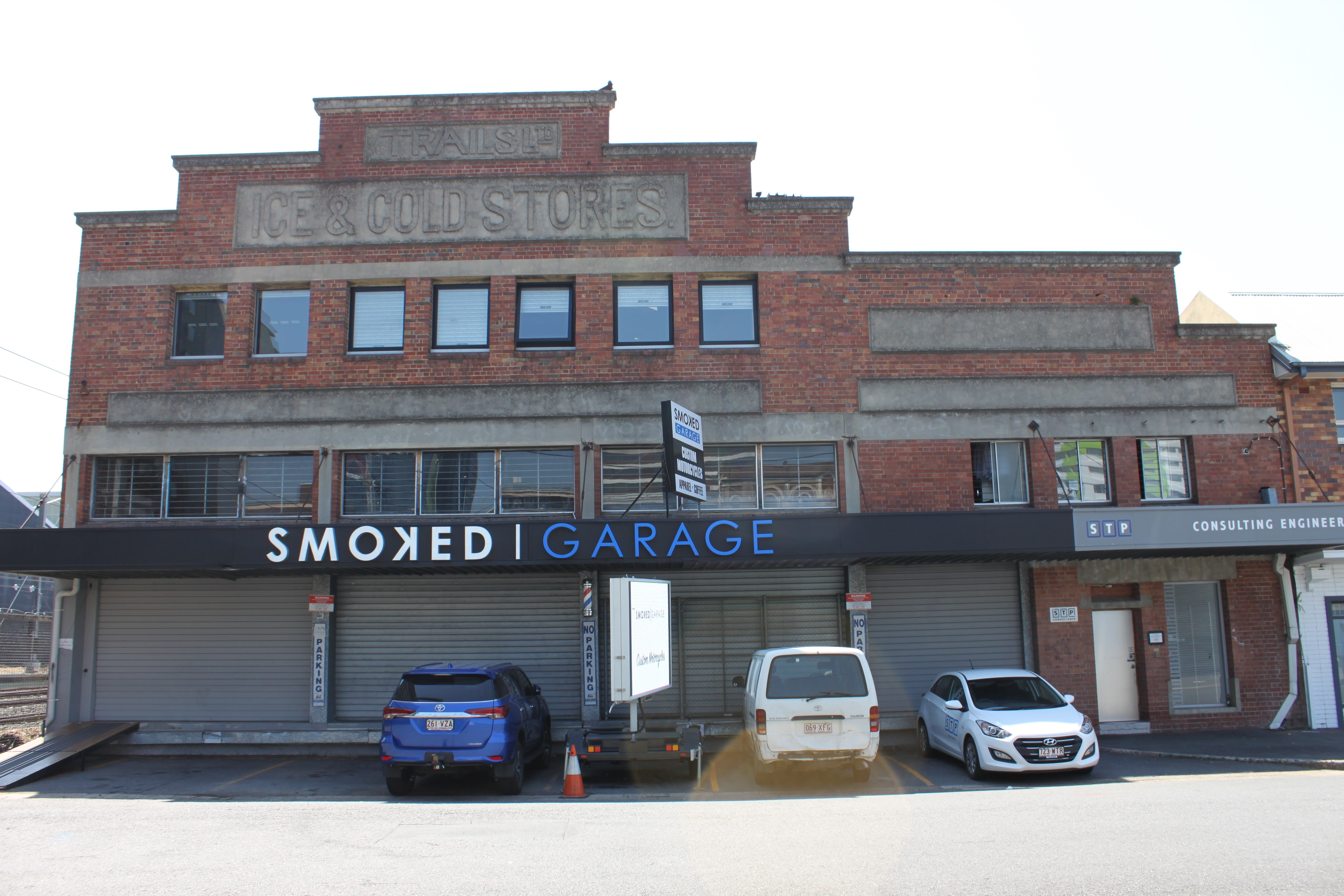
Lorna Jane's first factory building, at 99 Bridge Street, Fortitude Valley

By 2000, to expand the business, the Clarksons sold their home in the Brisbane suburb of Paddington for $450,000 to purchase a factory in Fortitude Valley. In interviews, Clarkson expressed sadness at selling this house, where they had spent seven years renovating and had a view of the church where they had married. They refurbished it for clothes production, and built an apartment living space above it. As the value of the property increased eightfold in the following two years, it was used as collareral for further growth.

Clarkson and her husband, Bill, retain a 60% stake in the Lorna Jane brand, after private equity firm CHAMP Ventures purchased a 40% stake in 2010. In 2016, the overall value of the business was estimated at $500 million, with an annual revenue for 2014 estimated at $200 million.

In 2014, the Clarksons considered selling the business, but eventually withdrew when they considered the implications of losing their personal control of what they had built, with Clarkson saying she would lose a part of her identity without the brand.

During 2015, the Lorna Jane company was the subject of media attention over allegations that a former manager had been bullied at work because of her body shape, and separately, over a job ad the company posted for a receptionist requiring physical characteristics so she could also work as a fitting model for garment development. Clarkson found the experience stressful, believing she had been misunderstood, though she concluded there was value in being expressive to the public.

In December 2020, the Australian Competition & Consumer Commission initiated legal action against Lorna Jane after the company released the LJ Shield product which it claimed stopped the "transferal of all pathogens" during the Coronavirus pandemic. The following year, a federal court judge found that Lorna Jane "represented to consumers that it had a reasonable scientific or technological basis" to make its claims when it had none. Clarkson had authorised and approved the promotional material for this product, and had made the same claims in media communications.

In August 2024, Clarkson was named a judge of The CEO Magazine's Executive of the Year Awards in Sydney. The following September, Clarkson personally acquired the SOMA wellness retreat in the Byron Bay hinterland, New South Wales, for a reported AU$10.98 million. The property had previously been used as a filming location for the television series Nine Perfect Strangers.

== Personal life ==
Clarkson has not had children, which she describes a choice made to allow a focus on her career, and because she had no strong desire to be a mother. As of 2015, Clarkson owned a four-year-old Moodle named Roger, who was the subject of an official Instagram account.

The Clarksons paid $10.3 million for a riverfront home in Hamilton. As of 2015, it was the fourth-most expensive residential property purchase in Brisbane ever. With the Clarksons spending increasing amounts of time in the United States to oversee the brand's expansion into that country, they bought a property in Santa Monica, California in early 2016. The property has two large houses on it; one in which they live, and the other which they have fitted out as a design studio for Lorna.

Clarkson maintains a series of routines. These include each night laying out activewear for the next day (which she finds more authentic than businesswear), and waking early and spending an hour of what she calls "me time" followed by physical activity such as yoga, dog-walking and weights. In 2014, she was doing strength training twice a week, yoga or stretching "every single day" and two or three fitness classes a week. She says that most of her design ideas come to her while she is exercising.

Clarkson cites her favourite designers as Helmut Lang, Manolo Blahnik, Isabel Marant, and Chanel. She admires Oprah Winfrey as a female leader, Steve Jobs as consistent in his vision, Bono, and Al Gore, but says that her husband, Bill, is her biggest source of inspiration. She has collected inspirational quotes, images, and mantras her "whole life" and has mood boards all over her home. She believes that authenticity is a key element of her success.

Clarkson believes in avoiding overspending at work and in her personal finances, and aims to stay debt-free. She credits this to the advice of her mother, and has never paid interest on consumer credit. In an interview in 2012, she expressed pride in her self-identification as an active manager, arriving at the office early and staying late each day. She identifies inspiring women to live active lives as an important element of her personal and professional life.

== Awards and praise ==
In March 2013 and again in March 2014, Clarkson was included in the BRW "Rich Women" list of the thirty wealthiest Australian women who had not inherited their money. Her fortune was reported at $40 million in 2013 and $50 million in 2014.

In 2016, Forbes named Clarkson among Asia's 50 Power Businesswomen.

Lorna Jane has won a total of 14 design awards and numerous marketing awards. Clarkson has personally received the AMP Capital and BRW Award for Australia's Outstanding Retailer and has won multiple RAQ Fashion Design Awards.

== Publications ==
Clarkson has published six books on health and wellbeing: Move, Nourish, Believe: The Fit Woman's Secret Revealed (2011), MORE of the Fit Woman's Secrets (2013), NOURISH - The Fit Woman's Cookbook (2014), INSPIRED (2015), Love You (2017), and Eat Good Food (2018).

Her books are based on a philosophy of "Move, Nourish, Believe", and are marketed as practical guides to living actively rather than fitness or diet books in the conventional sense.

== Vodcast ==
In February 2025, Clarkson launched the Never Give Up podcast and vodcast - a video podcast format - featuring interviews with women founders, entrepreneurs and public figures on themes of resilience and self-belief.
