= Springwood, Queensland =

Springwood
- Suburb
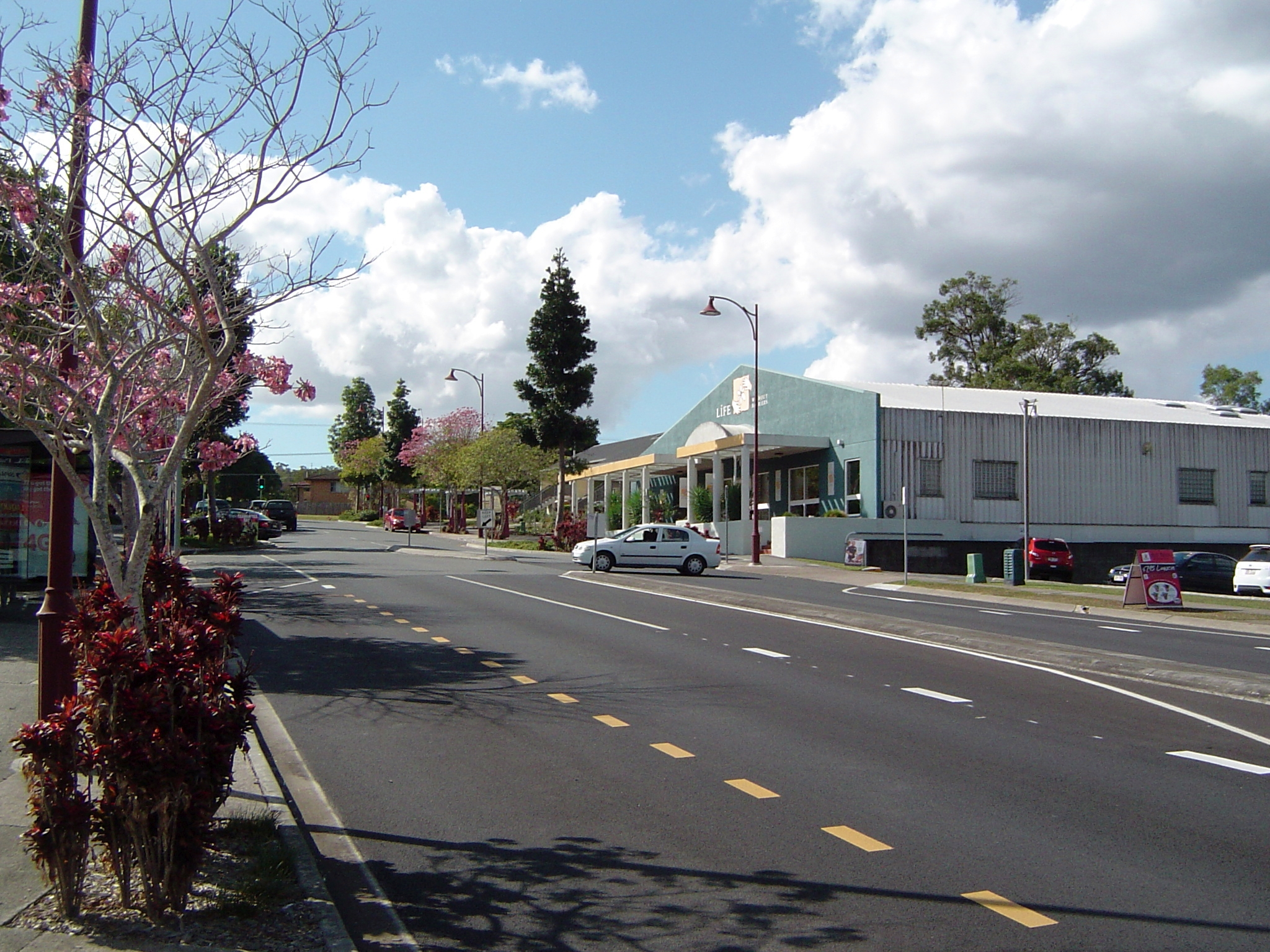
- Fitzgerald Avenue, 2014

- Interactive map of Springwood
- Coordinates: 27.6213°S 153.1372°E
- Country: Australia
- State: Queensland
- City: Logan City
- LGA: Logan City
- Location: 5.3 km (3.3 mi) NE of Logan Central; 21.8 km (13.5 mi) SE of Brisbane CBD

Government
  - State electorate: Springwood
  - Federal division: Rankin

Area
  - Total: 6.0 km^{2} (2.3 sq mi)

Population
  - Total: 9,710 (2021 census)
  - Density: 1,618/km^{2} (4,190/sq mi)
- Time zone: UTC+10:00 (AEST)
- Postcode: 4127
Suburbs around Springwood
Underwood	Rochedale South	Priestdale
Slacks Creek	Springwood	Daisy Hill
Slacks Creek	Slacks Creek	Daisy Hill

Springwood is a suburb in the City of Logan, Queensland, Australia. In the 2021 census, Springwood had a population of 9,710 people.

== Geography ==
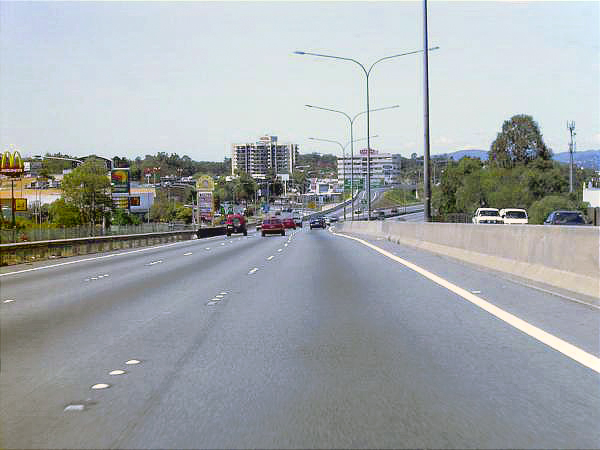
Pacific Motorway at Springwood, 2007

The size of Springwood is approximately 6 km². It has 17 parks covering nearly 9% of the total area. The population of Springwood in 1996 was 9,738 people. By 2001 the population was 9,084 showing a population decline of 7% in the area during that time. A high proportion of people in Springwood are in the baby boomers generation compared to population proportions in the surrounding local government area.

== History ==
Springwood is situated in the Yugarabul traditional Aboriginal country of the Brisbane and surrounding regions. Indigenous Australian people from the Yugambeh and Jaggera language groups inhabited the local area.

Springwood was laid out as a development when the South East Freeway to Brisbane was planned, at one end of the proposed Freeway. This was expected to be finished in 1972, but was not finished until 1985. The development was named after the name of the property owned by Brigader Sam Langford in 1932.

Springwood State High School opened on 24 January 1977.

Dennis Road State School opened on 24 January 1977, but just after the official opening, it was renamed Springwood Central State School.

Chatswood Hills State School opened on 24 January 1983.

Calvary Christian College opened on 23 January 1984.

From the 2000s, both the Queensland government and Logan City Council proposed that Springwood be redeveloped as a Principal Activity Centre (PAC). This was initially noted by the Queensland government in a 2005 paper, South East Queensland Regional Plan. The paper, in addition to its follow-up paper in 2009, cites multiple reasons for developing a PAC in Springwood: the area's close proximity to the Pacific Motorway, its strategic location between Brisbane City and the Gold Coast, existing urban infrastructure and availability of affordable housing. The aim of the proposal is to reduce growth pressures in established PACs whilst encouraging more employment opportunities and economic growth in South East Queensland.

In October 2009, Logan City Council partnered with GHD to create a master plan for redeveloping Springwood as a PAC. This plan was made after consultations with key stakeholders and residents in the local area. Using the South East Queensland Regional Plan as a foundation, the master plan envisions a future for Springwood in the year 2031 and beyond. The plan proposes a significant change in form and function of the suburb compared to its current state. As a suburb with a significant presence in automotive retail showrooms, the plan encourages these showrooms to consolidate around Compton Road and the Logan Mega Centre. The plan proposes new low-rise office spaces, residential apartments, recreational spaces, retail and commercial spaces to be developed within close distance to Springwood busway station. Moreover, the plan outlines two new town squares, a new road intersecting Dennis Road and Carol Avenue, a theatre, an art gallery, rehabilitation of Slacks Creek and an upgrade to public transport facilities.

Springwood Summit was held in October 2016 to jumpstart further public interest and discussion of the suburb. The summit had the tagline: "The start of SEQ's next CBD". More than 200 delegates from around the world attended the summit.

Logan City Council's Local Government Infrastructure Plan (LGIP) planned for land acquisition of two local state schools for new parks and town square between 2019 and 2021.

== Demographics ==
In the 2016 census, there were 9,148 people in Springwood. Of these 49.1% were male and 50.9% were female. Aboriginal and/or Torres Strait Islander people made up 1.6% of the population. The median age remained unchanged at 37 years. 63.5% of people were born in Australia. The most common countries of birth were New Zealand 8.4%, England 4.1%, India 1.6%, China (excludes SARs and Taiwan) 1.2% and Philippines 1.0%. In Springwood, 79.4% of people only spoke English at home. Other languages spoken at home included Mandarin 1.4%, Korean 1.0%, Cantonese 0.9%, Romanian 0.6% and Punjabi 0.6%.

In the 2021 census, there were 9,710 people in Springwood. Of these 48.8% were male and 51.2% were female. Aboriginal and/or Torres Strait Islander people made up 1.9% of the population. The median age was 40 years. 65.9% of people were born in Australia. The most common countries of birth were New Zealand 7.8%, England 3.9%, India 1.8%, Korea 1.4% and Philippines 1.2%. In Springwood, 79.5% of people only spoke English at home. Other languages spoken at home included Mandarin 1.9%, Korean 1.7% and Punjabi 1.0%.

== Education ==
Springwood Central State School is a government primary (Early Childhood–6) school for boys and girls at 26–34 Dennis Road (27.6183°S 153.1309°E). In 2018, the school had an enrolment of 312 students with 27 teachers (24 full-time equivalent) and 20 non-teaching staff (13 full-time equivalent). It includes a special education program.

Chatswood Hills State School is a government primary (Prep–6) school for boys and girls at Raleigh Street (27.6281°S 153.1374°E). In 2018, the school had an enrolment of 617 students with 49 teachers (41 full-time equivalent) and 31 non-teaching staff (19 full-time equivalent). It includes a special education program.

Calvary Christian College is a private primary (Prep–6) school for boys and girls at 161 Dennis Road (27.6155°S 153.1429°E). In 2018, the school had an enrolment of 934 students with 82 teachers (70 full-time equivalent) and 117 non-teaching staff (60 full-time equivalent).

Springwood State High School is a government secondary (7–12) school for boys and girls at 202 Springwood Road (27.6126°S 153.1359°E). In 2018, the school had an enrolment of 649 students with 66 teachers (62 full-time equivalent) and 37 non-teaching staff (25 full-time equivalent). It includes a special education program.

== Springwood Conservation Park ==
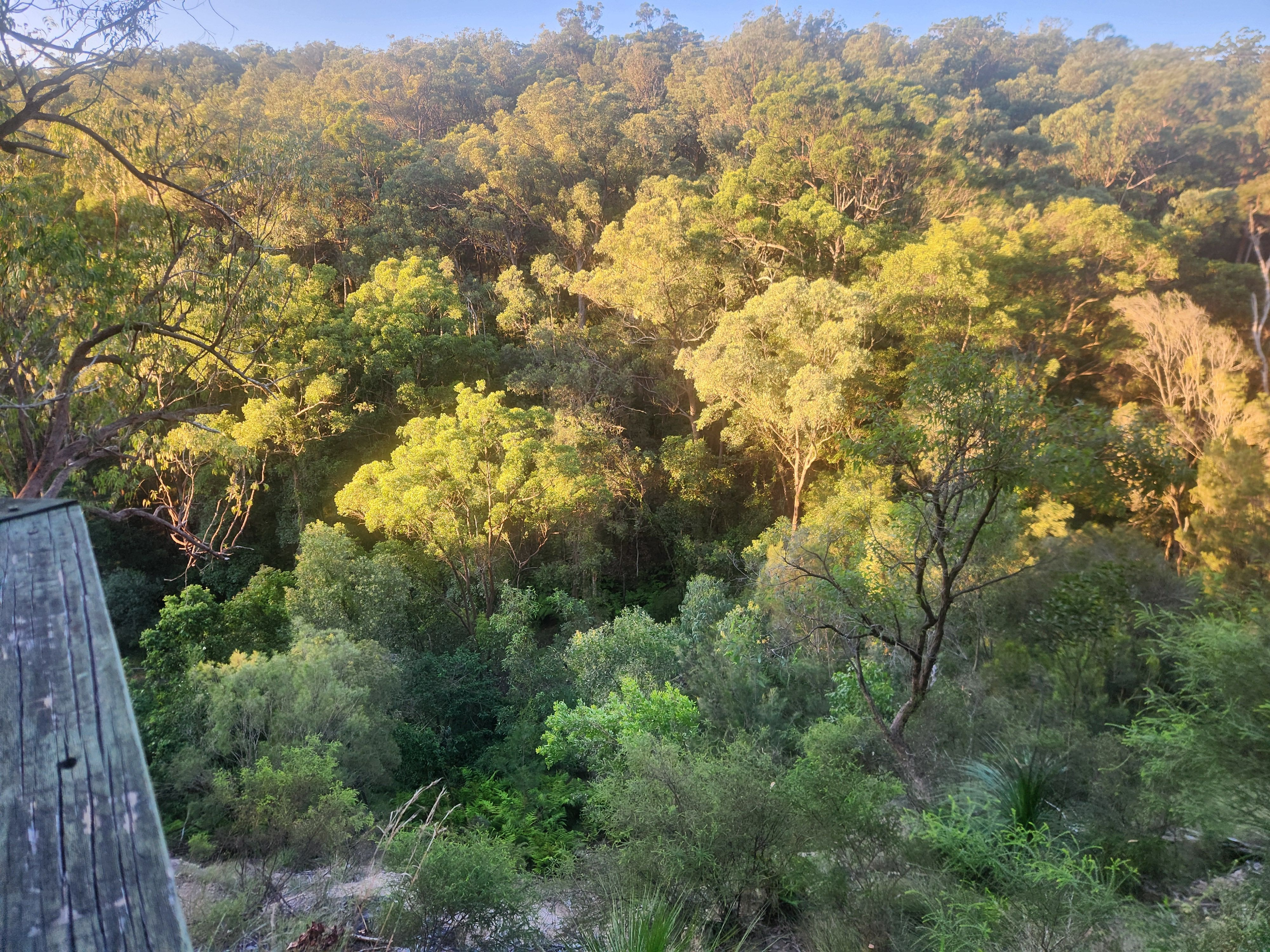
View from Stringybark Lookout

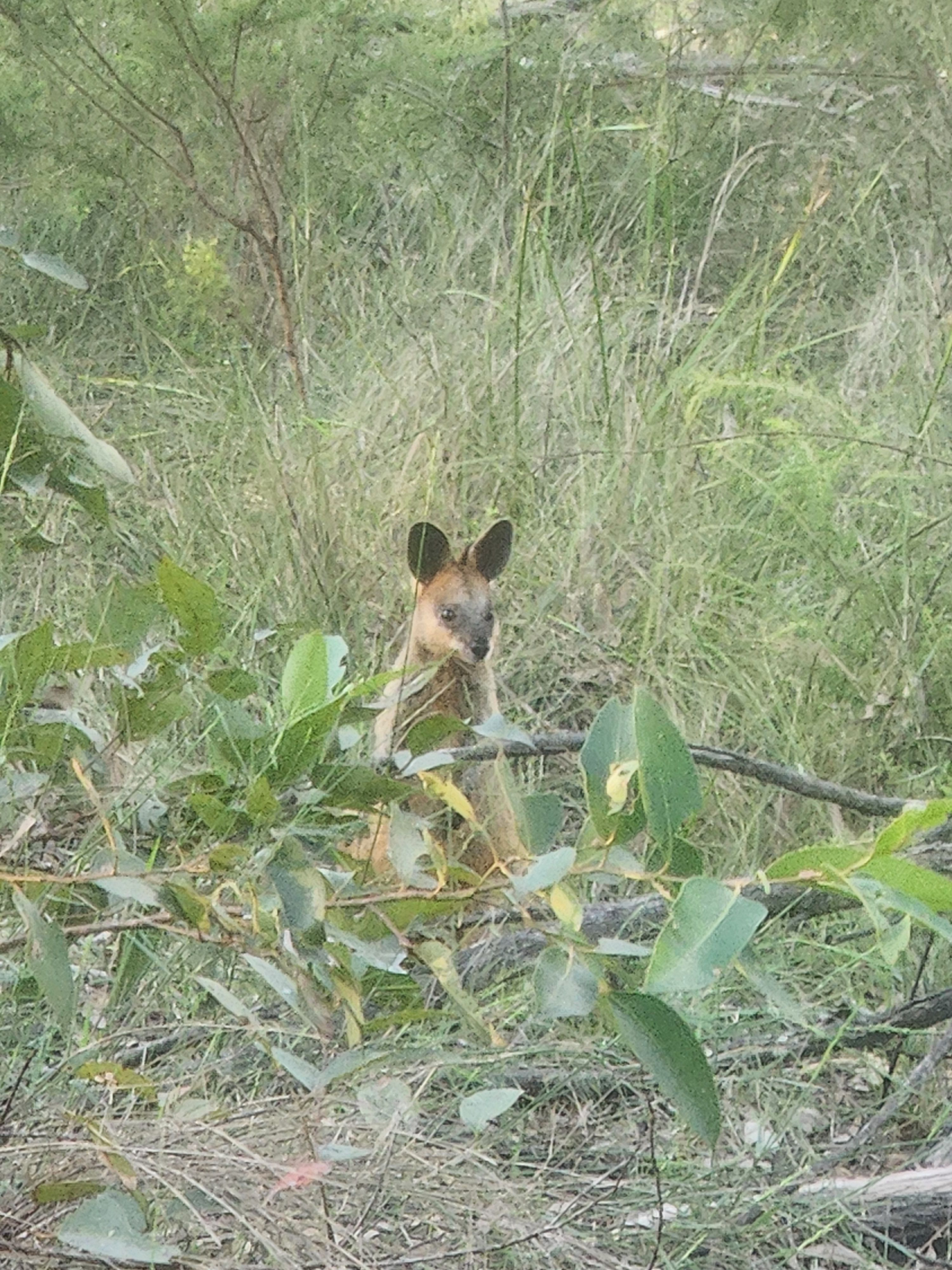
Swamp Wallaby on the Gorge Discovery Circuit

Views of Springwood Conservation Park

Springwood Conservation Park is a 36 hectare natural bushland reserve located along a natural gorge that is bordered by the Springwood Reservoir and suburban areas. Located in a former quarry site, after a community campaign, Logan City Council became its trustee and it was gazetted as an environmental park in 1990, before designating it a conservation park in 1994. The park became park of the Koala Bushland Coordinated Conservation Area (KBCCA) in 1996, an important 1500 hectare regional conservation area for the koala. Koalas have been listed as endangered since the Queensland's Nature Conservation Act (1992) due mainly to habitat loss. In addition to helping protect it, the park helps protects several endangered tree species on which they feed as well as other locally vulnerable animals including the Short-beaked echidna and rainbow bee-eater. The Gorge Discovery Circuit is a popular walking and running track. Springwood Stairs escalate the escarpment and are known locally as the "stairs of death".

== Notable people ==
- Lorna Jane Clarkson, entrepreneur, attended Springwood State High School
