= Rochedale =

- Suburb
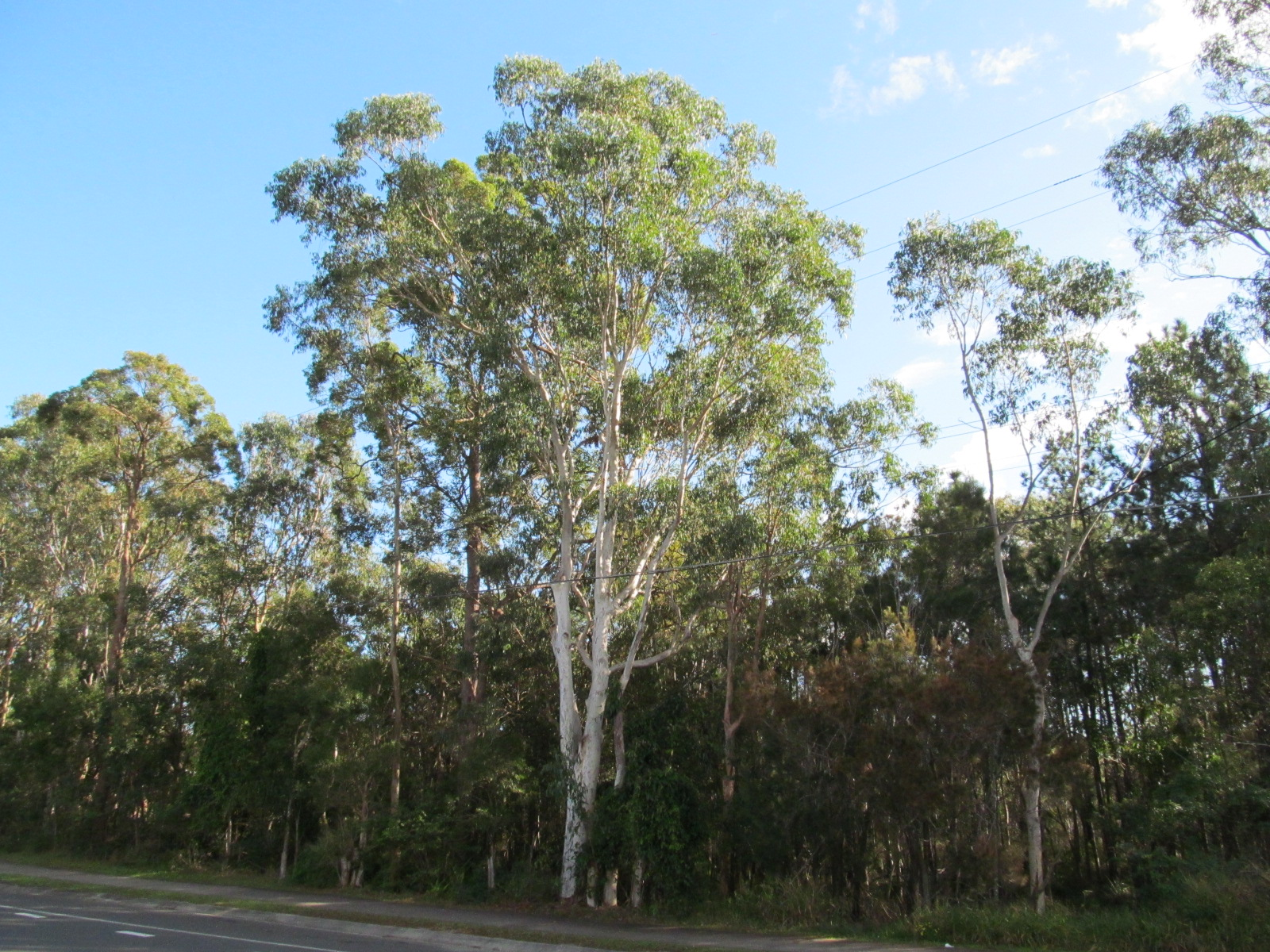
- Bush along Underwood Road, 2013

- Interactive map of Rochedale
- Coordinates: 27.5706°S 153.1242°E
- Country: Australia
- State: Queensland
- City: Brisbane
- LGA: City of Brisbane (Chandler Ward)
- Location: 18.9 km (11.7 mi) SE of Brisbane CBD

Government
  - State electorate: Mansfield
  - Federal division: Bonner

Area
  - Total: 15.0 km^{2} (5.8 sq mi)

Population
  - Total: 7,633 (2021 census)
  - Density: 508.9/km^{2} (1,318/sq mi)
- Time zone: UTC+10:00 (AEST)
- Postcode: 4123
Suburbs around Rochedale
| Mansfield | Mackenzie | Burbank |
| Wishart | Rochedale | Burbank |
| Eight Mile Plains | Underwood; Rochedale South | Priestdale |

Rochedale (/ˈroʊtʃdeɪl/ ROHTCH-dayl) is an outer southern suburb in the City of Brisbane, Queensland, Australia. In the 2021 census, Rochedale had a population of 7,633 people.

== Geography ==
Rochedale is 18.9 kilometres (12 mi) by road south-east of the Brisbane CBD.

The Brisbane Metro depot for electric buses is located in Rochedale due to its proximity to the South East Busway. The 10-hectare (25-acre) site includes a one-megawatt solar power system.

== History ==
During convict settlement, explorers passed through the region but it was not until 1865 that the first settlers started farming the area's rich alluvial soil. The area takes its name from the Roche family, who emigrated from Ireland to Australia in 1860 and settled in the region. The family built a homestead they called Rochedale in 1868.

Rochedale State School was established at the intersection of Miles Platting Road and Rochedale Road on 1 April 1931.

In 1956, the Rochedale Scout Group was formed and established a Scout Den on the corner of Grieve and Rochedale Roads. This parcel of land is zoned for recreational use by the Brisbane City Council.

St Peter's Catholic Primary School was established in 1976 by the Presentation Sisters with an initial enrolment of 44 students.

Redeemer Lutheran College opened on 4 February 1980 with 56 Year 8 students under headmaster Leslie Robin Kleinschmidt. The school was officially opened on 13 April 1980 by Joh Bjelke-Petersen, the Queensland Premier. In 1999, a middle school consisting of Years 6 to 8 was created. In 2007, a junior school consisting of Years Prep to 5 was added.

Rochedale State High School opened on 24 January 1983.

The Rochedale dump began operations in 1991, despite numerous controversies. A waste-to-energy facility has been generating electricity since 2004.

== Demographics ==
In the 2011 census, the population of Rochedale was 1,092, 49.5% female and 50.5% male. The median age of the Rochedale population was 43 years, 6 years above the Australian median. 64.9% of people living in Rochedale were born in Australia, compared to the national average of 69.8%; the next most common countries of birth were Taiwan 3.8%, England 3.7%, New Zealand 3.5%, Italy 1.2%, United States of America 1.2%. 72.4% of people spoke only English at home; the next most common languages were 4.2% Mandarin, 1.6% Italian, 1.6% Greek, 1.5% Cantonese, 1% Punjabi.

In the 2016 census, Rochedale had a population of 3,175 people. Of these 49.5% were male and 50.5% were female.

In the 2021 census, Rochedale had a population of 7,633 people.

== Heritage listings ==
Rochedale has heritage-listed sites, including:

- Native Fern Gardens, 447 Miles Platting Road (27.5795°S 153.1141°E)

== Education ==
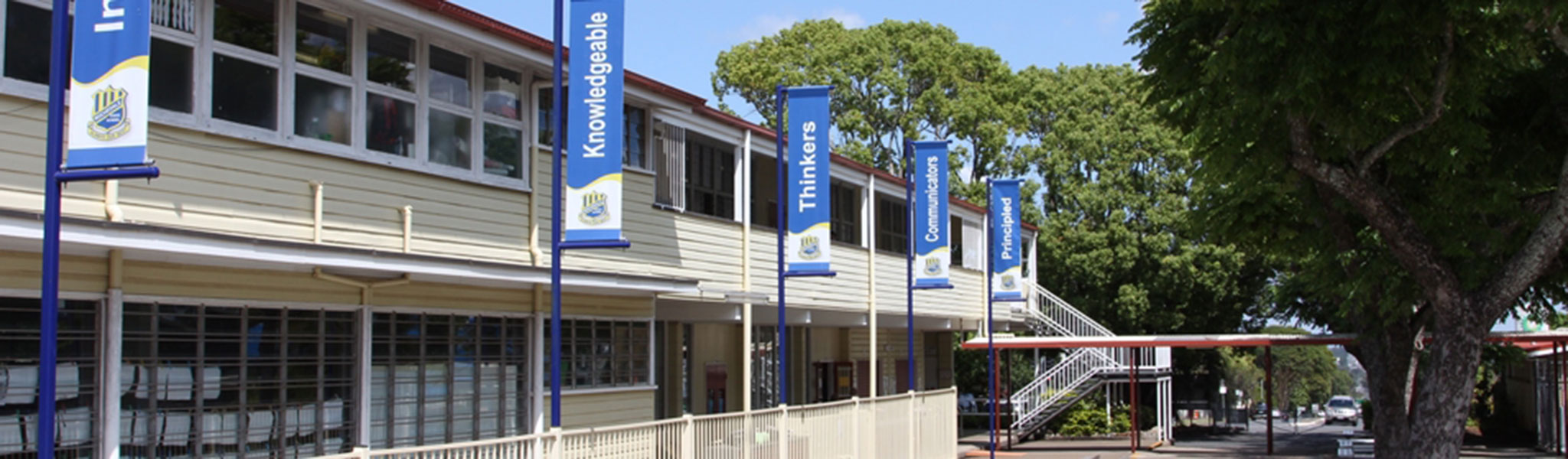
Rochedale State School, circa 2021

Rochedale State School is a government primary (Prep–6) school for boys and girls at 694 Rochedale Road (27.5800°S 153.1253°E). In 2018, the school had an enrolment of 981 students with 70 teachers (63 full-time equivalent) and 31 non-teaching staff (20 full-time equivalent). It includes a special education program.

St Peter's Primary School is a Catholic primary (Prep–6) school for boys and girls at 955 Rochedale Road (27.5930°S 153.1223°E). In 2018, the school had an enrolment of 464 students with 33 teachers (27 full-time equivalent) and 20 non-teaching staff (12 full-time equivalent).

Redeemer Lutheran College is a private primary and secondary (Prep–12) school for boys and girls at 745 Rochedale Road (27.5852°S 153.1241°E). In 2018, the school had an enrolment of 994 students with 70 teachers (67 full-time equivalent) and 63 non-teaching staff (48 full-time equivalent).

Rochedale State High School is a government secondary (7–12) school for boys and girls at 249 Priestdale Road (27.5856°S 153.1114°E). In 2018, the school had an enrolment of 1,371 students with 110 teachers (104 full-time equivalent) and 40 non-teaching staff (31 full-time equivalent). It includes a special education program.

== Amenities ==
The suburb of Rochedale is supported by many community organisations including sporting clubs, religious entities, youth organisations and educational groups.

There are a number of churches, including:

- St Philip's Anglican Church, 270 Rochedale Road (27.5642°S 153.1288°E)
- St Peter's Catholic Church, 955 Rochedale Road (27.5926°S 153.1221°E)

== See also ==
- List of Brisbane suburbs
