= Springwood State High School =

Coordinates: 27°36′41″S 153°08′20″E

- Springwood, Queensland; Australia

Information
- Type: Public
- Motto: The highest expectations
- Established: 1977
- Grades: Year 7 to Year 12
- Website: springwoodshs.eq.edu.au

Springwood State High School is a public, co-educational, high school, located in the Logan City suburb of Springwood, in Queensland, Australia. It is administered by the Department of Education, with an enrolment of 549 students and a teaching staff of 51, as of 2023. The school serves students from Year 7 to Year 12, and is home to one of fifteen air quality monitoring stations in South East Queensland.

== History ==
The school opened on 24 January 1977 to Grade 8 students, with its official opening occurring in 1978.

In 2010, the school suspended 20 students over the creation of a Facebook page that bullied staff members of the school.

== Notable alumni ==
Some Springwood High School students have become notable, including:

- Steven Bradbury – First Australian gold medal winner at the Winter Olympics,
- Jodie Henry – Triple Olympic gold medal winner,
- Aidan McLindon – Queensland politician,
- Grant Musgrove – Ex-Queensland politician (was member for Springwood),
- Lorna Jane Clarkson – founder of Lorna Jane fitness clothing stores worldwide,
- Quade Cooper – rugby union player,
- Steven Johnson – Australian V8 racing driver.

== See also ==
- List of schools in Greater Brisbane
