= List of schools in Greater Brisbane =

Schools in Greater Brisbane

This is a list of schools in the Greater Brisbane region of Queensland, Australia. Specifically, it includes within the local government areas of City of Brisbane, City of Ipswich, City of Logan, City of Moreton Bay, and City of Redland. Prior to 2015, the Queensland education system consisted of primary schools, which accommodated students from Kindergarten to Year 7 (ages 5–13), and high schools, which accommodate students from Years 8 to 12 (ages 12–18). However, from 2015, Year 7 became the first year of high school.

== State schools ==
=== State primary schools ===
| Name | Suburb | Area | Opened | Coordinates | Notes |
|---|---|---|---|---|---|
| Acacia Ridge State School | Acacia Ridge | Brisbane South | 1869–1997 | 27.5811°S 153.0252°E | Opened in 1869 as Coopers Plains Provisional/State School, renamed Acacia Ridge State School in 1956. Located at 1277 Beaudesert Road. |
| Acacia Ridge State School | Acacia Ridge | Brisbane South | 1998–present | 27.5795°S 153.0160°E | Relocated to the site of the former Acacia Ridge State High School at 67 Nyngam Street. |
| Albany Creek State School | Albany Creek | Moreton Bay | 1875 | 27.3458°S 152.9706°E | At 696 Albany Creek Road. |
| Albany Hills State School | Albany Creek | Moreton Bay | 1979 | 27.3604°S 152.9729°E | At 118-130 Keong Road. |
| Alexandra Hills State School | Alexandra Hills | Redland | 1975 | 27.5184°S 153.2201°E | |
| Algester State School | Algester | Brisbane South | 1977 | 27.6154°S 153.0309°E | |
| Ascot State School | Ascot | Brisbane North-east | 1920 | 27.4331°S 153.0555°E | Listed on the Queensland Heritage Register |
| Ashgrove State School | Ashgrove | Brisbane North | 1877 | 27.4476°S 152.9774°E | |
| Aspley State School | Aspley | Brisbane North | 1890 | 27.3694°S 153.0139°E | Was originally known as Little Cabbage Tree Creek State School |
| Aspley East State School | Aspley | Brisbane North | 1963 | 27.3619°S 153.0241°E | At 31 Helena Street. |
| Augusta State School | Augustine Heights | Ipswich | 2011 | 27.6558°S 152.8765°E | At 60-100 Brittains Road |
| Bald Hills State School | Bald Hills | Brisbane North | 1866 | 27.3200°S 153.0068°E | At 2156 Gympie Road. |
| Banksia Beach State School | Banksia Beach (Bribie Island) | Moreton Bay | 1992 | 27.0460°S 153.1485°E | At 133 Sunderland Road. |
| Bardon State School | Bardon | Brisbane North | 1948 | 27.4600°S 152.9723°E | Infants until 1958 |
| Bay View State School | Thornlands | Redland | 2010 | 27.5634°S 153.2621°E | |
| Beachmere State School | Beachmere | Moreton Bay | 1986 | 27.1315°S 153.0476°E | 24–58 James Road. |
| Beenleigh State School | Beenleigh | Logan | 1871 | 27.7182°S 153.1994°E | |
| Belmont State School | Carindale | Brisbane East | 1876 | 27.5029°S 153.1155°E | |
| Bellbird Park State School | Bellbird Park | Ipswich | 2024 | 27.6374°S 152.8787°E | At 30 Harris Street. |
| Berrinba East State School | Berrinba | Logan | 1977 | 27.6518°S 153.0975°E | |
| Birkdale State School | Birkdale | Redland | 1916 | 27.4924°S 153.2161°E | |
| Birkdale South State School | Birkdale | Redland | 1982 | 27.5059°S 153.2126°E | |
| Blair State School | Sadliers Crossing | Ipswich | 1917 | 27.6122°S 152.7492°E | On Cribb Street (27.6120°S 152.7485°E). |
| Boondall State School | Boondall | Brisbane North-east | 1925 | 27.3483°S 153.0592°E | Listed on the Brisbane Heritage Register. |
| Boronia Heights State School | Boronia Heights | Logan | 1990 | 27.6846°S 153.0181°E | |
| Bounty Boulevard State School | North Lakes | Moreton Bay | 2009 | 27.2150°S 153.0077°E | |
| Bracken Ridge State School | Bracken Ridge | Brisbane North | 1957 | 27.3237°S 153.0266°E | |
| Brassall State School | Brassall | Ipswich | 1894 | 27.5894°S 152.7482°E | At 130 Pine Mountain Road. |
| Bray Park State School | Bray Park | Moreton Bay | 1973 | 27.2930°S 152.9756°E | |
| Bribie Island State School | Bongaree | Bribie Island | 1924 | 27.0826°S 153.1633°E | |
| Brighton State School | Brighton | Bayside North | 1920 | 27.2942°S 153.0515°E | |
| Brisbane Central State School | Spring Hill | Brisbane Central | 1875 | 27.4592°S 153.0278°E | Originally known as Leichhardt Street State School and was divided into separate schools for Boys, Girls and Infants from 1875 to 1926. In the period 1927 to 1954 it was sometimes also known as the Brisbane Normal School and also as the Central Practicing School due to the closure of the school using those names in 1927 when most of the pupils transferred to Leichhardt Street State School. It changed name to Brisbane Central State School in 1954. |
| Brookfield State School | Brookfield | Brisbane West | 1871 | 27.4951°S 152.9132°E | |
| Browns Plains State School | Browns Plains | Logan | 1983 | 27.6686°S 153.0537°E | |
| Bulimba State School | Bulimba | Brisbane East | 1866 | 27.4527°S 153.0646°E | |
| Bundamba State School | Bundamba | Ipswich | 1873 | 27.6123°S 152.8048°E | At 221 Brisbane Road. |
| Buranda State School | Woolloongabba | Brisbane Inner South | 1918 | 27.4970°S 153.0431°E | Split sex until 1967. At 24 Cowley Street. Listed on the Queensland Heritage Register. |
| Burpengary State School | Burpengary | Moreton Bay | 1876 | 27.1581°S 152.9591°E | |
| Burpengary Meadows State School | Burpengary | Moreton Bay | 2007 | 27.1598°S 152.9388°E | |
| Burrowes State School | Marsden | Logan | 1987 | 27.6758°S 153.0899°E | |
| Caboolture State School | Caboolture | Moreton Bay | 1889 | 27.0825°S 152.9487°E | At 12 George Street. |
| Caboolture East State School | Caboolture | Moreton Bay | 1980 | 27.0774°S 152.9605°E | At 44 Manley Street. |
| Camira State School | Camira | Ipswich | 1974 | 27.6216°S 152.9148°E | |
| Camp Hill State Infants and Primary School | Camp Hill | Brisbane East | 1926 | 27.4928°S 153.0786°E | |
| Cannon Hill State School | Cannon Hill | Brisbane East | 1915 | 27.4682°S 153.0836°E | Listed on the Queensland Heritage Register |
| Carbrook State School | Carbrook | Logan | 1877 | 27.6780°S 153.2350°E | Opened on November 5, 1877 as Gramzow Provisional School. Upgraded to Gramzow State School on January 1, 1879. The area was renamed to Carbrook in 1916, and therefore the school as well. It was moved to its current location in 1987, with the original site becoming Heritage Listed on October 21, 1992. |
| Carina State School | Carina | Brisbane East | 1917 | 27.4936°S 153.1022°E | |
| Carole Park State School | Wacol | Brisbane South-west | 1948 | 27.6073°S 152.9337°E | |
| Chapel Hill State School | Chapel Hill | Brisbane West | 1978 | 27.4994°S 152.9450°E | At 20 Ironbark Road. |
| Chatswood Hills State School | Springwood | Logan | 1983 | 27.6292°S 153.1382°E | |
| Churchill State School | Churchill | Ipswich | 1923 | 27.6432°S 152.7524°E | |
| Cleveland State School | Cleveland | Redland | 1868 | 27.5290°S 153.2712°E | |
| Clontarf Beach State School | Clontarf | Redcliffe | 1950 | 27.2539°S 153.0811°E | |
| Collingwood Park State School | Collingwood Park | Ipswich | 1986 | 27.6146°S 152.8629°E | |
| Coolnwynpin State School | Capalaba | Redland | 1984 | 27.5472°S 153.2030°E | |
| Coopers Plains State School | Coopers Plains | Brisbane South | 1931 | 27.5677°S 153.0396°E | Formerly Orange Grove State School until 1965 |
| Coorparoo State School | Coorparoo | Brisbane East | 1876 | 27.4943°S 153.0603°E | |
| Corinda State School | Corinda | Brisbane West | 1927 | 27.5485°S 152.9816°E | |
| Craigslea State School | Chermside West | Brisbane North | 1972 | 27.3837°S 153.0174°E | |
| Crestmead State School | Crestmead | Logan | 1984 | 27.6878°S 153.0900°E | Original name was Hubner State School, however this was changed to Crestmead just before the school opened. |
| Daisy Hill State School | Daisy Hill | Logan | 1873 | 27.6431°S 153.1525°E | At 20–50 Daisy Hill Road. Originally Slacks Creek State School, renamed Daisy Hil State School on 14 October 2016. |
| Dakabin State School | Dakabin | Moreton Bay | 1992 | 27.2374°S 152.9860°E | |
| Darra State School | Darra | Brisbane South-west | 1916 | 27.5714°S 152.9537°E | |
| Dayboro State School | Dayboro | Moreton Bay | 1874 | 27.1947°S 152.8208°E | At 58 McKenzie Street. |
| Deception Bay State School | Deception Bay | Moreton Bay | 1892 | 27.1908°S 153.0284°E | |
| Deception Bay North State School | Deception Bay | Moreton Bay | 1979 | 27.1812°S 153.0161°E | |
| Delaneys Creek State School | Delaneys Creek | Moreton Bay | 1892 | 26.9990°S 152.7954°E | |
| Dunwich State School | Dunwich | North Stradbroke | 1904 | 27.4966°S 153.4045°E | Primary school until 1992 and from 2012. |
| Durack State School | Durack | Brisbane South-west | 1959 | 27.5969°S 152.9822°E | Formerly Serviceton SS until Jan 2001 |
| Dutton Park State School | Dutton Park | Brisbane Inner South | 1884 | 27.4937°S 153.0284°E | |
| Eagle Junction State School | Clayfield | Brisbane North-east | 1895 | 27.4189°S 153.0507°E | |
| Eagleby State School | Eagleby | Logan | 1988 | 27.6928°S 153.2144°E | 222–2660 Fryar Road (corner of Herses Road). This is the second Eagleby State School. There was an earlier school (1906–1966) in Eagleby Road. |
| Eagleby South State School | Eagleby | Logan | 1978 | 27.7036°S 153.2130°E | 131–171 River Hills Road (corner of Fryar Road) |
| East Brisbane State School | East Brisbane | Brisbane East | 1899 | 27.4864°S 153.0397°E | |
| Eatons Hill State School | Eatons Hill | Moreton Bay | 1998 | 27.3357°S 152.9584°E | |
| Edens Landing State School | Edens Landing | Logan | 1997 | 27.7056°S 153.1703°E | |
| Eight Mile Plains State School | Eight Mile Plains | Brisbane South-east | 1869-circa 1880 | approx 27.5852°S 153.1006°E | In Charles Baker's paddock on Logan Road between Levington Road and the Glen Hotel. |
| Eight Mile Plains State School | Eight Mile Plains | Brisbane South-east | circa 1880–1958 | 27.5892°S 153.1062°E | On the western corner of the intersection of Logan Road and Miller Street. |
| Eight Mile Plains State School | Eight Mile Plains | Brisbane South-east | 1958- | 27.5935°S 153.1090°E | 480 Underwood Road. |
| Enoggera State School | Enoggera | Brisbane North | 1871 | 27.4171°S 152.9939°E | |
| Everton Park State School | Everton Park | Brisbane North | 1934 | 27.3975°S 152.9857°E | |
| Fernbrooke State School | Redbank Plains | Ipswich | 2017 | 27.6619°S 152.8453°E | At 8 Regents Drive. |
| Ferny Grove State School | Ferny Grove | Brisbane North-west | 1875 | 27.4035°S 152.9294°E | |
| Ferny Hills State School | Ferny Hills | Moreton Bay | 1970 | 27.4017°S 152.9440°E | At 30-56 Illuta Avenue. |
| Fig Tree Pocket State School | Fig Tree Pocket | Brisbane West | 1871 | 27.5262°S 152.9654°E | |
| Flagstone State School | Jimboomba | Jimboomba | 1998 | 27.8074°S 152.9580°E | |
| Forest Lake State School | Forest Lake | Brisbane South-west | 1994 | 27.6128°S 152.9585°E | |
| Geebung State School | Geebung | Brisbane North | 1953 | 27.3748°S 153.0457°E | At 250 Newman Road. |
| Goodna State School | Goodna | Ipswich | 1861 | 27.6069°S 152.8937°E | |
| Graceville State School | Graceville | Brisbane West | 1928 | 27.5179°S 152.9791°E | |
| Grand Avenue State School | Forest Lake | Brisbane South-west | 1999 | 27.6266°S 152.9588°E | |
| Greenbank State School | Greenbank | Logan | 1893 | 27.7105°S 152.9769°E | |
| Greenslopes State School | Greenslopes | Brisbane South | 1890 | 27.5070°S 153.0493°E | At 559 Logan Road. |
| Grovely State School | Keperra | Brisbane North-west | 1956 | 27.4008°S 152.9609°E | |
| Gumdale State School | Gumdale | Brisbane East | 1935 | 27.4925°S 153.1516°E | |
| Hamilton State School | Hamilton | Brisbane North-east | 1907 | 27.4327°S 153.0741°E | In Oxford Street. |
| Harris Fields State School | Woodridge | Logan | 1975 | 27.6302°S 153.1163°E | |
| Hendra State School | Hendra | Brisbane North-east | 1864 | 27.4215°S 153.0742°E | |
| Hercules Road State School | Kippa-Ring | Redcliffe | 1976 | 27.2213°S 153.0792°E | |
| Hilder Road State School | The Gap | Brisbane West | 1979 | 27.4377°S 152.9364°E | |
| Hilliard State School | Alexandra Hills | Redland | 1991 | 27.5423°S 153.2310°E | |
| Holland Park State School | Holland Park | Brisbane South | 1929 | 27.5141°S 153.0617°E | |
| Humpybong State School | Margate | Redcliffe | 1876 | 27.2461°S 153.1088°E | |
| Inala State School | Inala | Brisbane South-west | 1955 | 27.5854°S 152.9761°E | At 99 Glenala Road (corner of Rosemary Street). |
| Indooroopilly State School | Indooroopilly | Brisbane West | 1879 | 27.4999°S 152.9658°E | |
| Ipswich Central State School | Ipswich | Ipswich | 1875 | 27.6212°S 152.7682°E | |
| Ipswich East State School | East Ipswich | Ipswich | 1958 | 27.6068°S 152.7769°E | At 18–24 Jacaranda Street. |
| Ipswich North State School | North Ipswich | Ipswich | 1867 | 27.6018°S 152.7633°E | At 9 Fitzgibbon Street. Listed on the Queensland Heritage Register. |
| Ipswich West State School | West Ipswich | Ipswich | 1861 | 27.6207°S 152.7506°E | At 12 Omar Street (corner of Keogh Street). Split sex 1893–1934 |
| Ironside State School | St Lucia | Brisbane West | 1870 | 27.5007°S 152.9965°E | |
| Ithaca Creek State School | Red Hill | Brisbane Central | 1885 | 27.4514°S 152.9915°E | Listed on the Queensland Heritage Register |
| Jamboree Heights State School | Jamboree Heights | Centenary Suburbs | 1974 | 27.5549°S 152.9300°E | At 35 Beanland Street. |
| Jimboomba State School | Jimboomba | Jimboomba | 1890 | 27.8286°S 153.0266°E | Provisional until Jun 1900. |
| Jindalee State School | Jindalee | Centenary Suburbs | 1966 | 27.5549°S 152.9300°E | |
| Jinibara State School | Narangba | Moreton Bay | 1996 | 27.1822°S 152.9500°E | |
| Junction Park State School | Annerley | Brisbane South | 1888 | 27.5098°S 153.0354°E | At 50 Waldheim Streets. Listed on the Queensland Heritage Register. |
| Kallangur State School | Kallangur | Moreton Bay | 1930 | 27.2488°S 152.9919°E | At 139 School Road. |
| Karalee State School | Karalee | Ipswich | 1985 | 27.5617°S 152.8253°E | At 77 Arthur Summervilles Road. |
| Kedron State School | Kedron | Brisbane North | 1926 | 27.4064°S 153.0355°E | |
| Kenmore State School | Kenmore | Brisbane West | 1900 | 27.5086°S 152.9389°E | |
| Kenmore South State School | Kenmore | Brisbane West | 1967 | 27.5184°S 152.9437°E | |
| Kimberley Park State School | Shailer Park | Logan | 1985 | 27.6475°S 153.1773°E | |
| Kingston State School | Kingston | Logan | 1912 | 27.6597°S 153.1117°E | |
| Kippa-Ring State School | Kippa-Ring | Redcliffe | 1960 | 27.2301°S 153.0867°E | |
| Kruger State School | Bellbird Park | Ipswich | 1978 | 27.6278°S 152.8752°E | |
| Kuraby State School | Kuraby | Brisbane South-east | 1928 | 27.6072°S 153.0962°E | |
| Kurwongbah State School | Petrie | Moreton Bay | 1986 | 27.2556°S 152.9689°E | |
| Lawnton State School | Lawnton | Moreton Bay | 1967 | 27.2813°S 152.9752°E | At 44-60 Todds Road. |
| Leichhardt State School | Leichhardt | Ipswich | 1956 | 27.6246°S 152.7370°E | |
| Logan Reserve State School | Logan Reserve | Logan | 1868 | 27.7143°S 153.1140°E | Provisional until Jan 1914 |
| Logan Village State School | Logan Village | Logan | 1872 | 27.7678°S 153.1054°E | Provisional until February 1901. At River and Wharf Streets. Listed on the Queensland Heritage Register. |
| Logan Village State School | Logan Village | Logan | 1981 | 27.76532°S 153.10635°E | In 1981, the school was re-established on a new site at 25-39 North Street. |
| Loganholme State School | Loganholme | Logan | 1873 | 27.6864°S 153.1807°E | |
| Lota State School | Lota | Brisbane Bayside | 1952 | 27.4689°S 153.1869°E | |
| Mabel Park State School | Slacks Creek | Logan | 1974 | 27.6442°S 153.1270°E | Initially known as Woodridge East State School before opening |
| McDowall State School | McDowall | Brisbane North | 1975 | 27.3888°S 152.9889°E | At 1018 Rode Road. |
| Macgregor State School | Macgregor | Brisbane South-east | 1972 | 27.5718°S 153.0667°E | |
| Macleay Island State School | Macleay Island | Redland | 1986 | 27.6186°S 153.3591°E | |
| Mango Hill State School | Mango Hill | Moreton Bay | 2012 | 27.2432°S 153.0337°E | |
| Manly State School | Manly | Brisbane Bayside | 1910 | 27.4581°S 153.1813°E | Listed on the Brisbane Heritage Register |
| Manly West State School | Manly West | Brisbane Bayside | 1958 | 27.4689°S 153.1748°E | |
| Mansfield State School | Mansfield | Brisbane South-east | 1970 | 27.5424°S 153.1064°E | |
| Marsden State School | Marsden | Logan | 1978 | 27.6845°S 153.1038°E | |
| Marshall Road State School | Holland Park West | Brisbane South | 1960 | 27.5257°S 153.0584°E | |
| Mayfield State School | Carina | Brisbane East | 1956 | 27.4843°S 153.0925°E | Not to be confused with Mayfield State School which opened in 1910 in King Scrub, City of Moreton Bay. |
| Middle Park State School | Middle Park | Centenary Suburbs | 1987 | 27.5599°S 152.9181°E | |
| Milton State School | Milton | Brisbane Central | 1889 | 27.4670°S 152.9990°E | listed on the Queensland Heritage Register |
| Minimbah State School | Morayfield | Moreton Bay | 1873 | 27.1103°S 152.9239°E | |
| Mitchelton State School | Mitchelton | Brisbane North-west | 1916 | 27.4131°S 152.9693°E | |
| Moggill State School | Moggill | Brisbane West | 1866 | 27.5688°S 152.8767°E | |
| Moorooka State School | Moorooka | Brisbane South | 1929 | 27.5368°S 153.0237°E | |
| Morayfield State School | Morayfield | Moreton Bay | 1873 | 27.1059°S 152.9470°E | |
| Morayfield East State School | Morayfield | Moreton Bay | 1991 | 27.1165°S 152.9668°E | |
| Moreton Downs State School | Deception Bay | Moreton Bay | 1995 | 27.2002°S 153.0164°E | |
| Morningside State School | Morningside | Brisbane East | 1926 | 27.4645°S 153.0663°E | |
| Mount Cotton State School | Mount Cotton | Redland | 1876 | 27.6217°S 153.2368°E | |
| Mount Crosby State School | Mount Crosby | West Rural | 1882 | 27.5510°S 152.8072°E | |
| Mount Gravatt State School | Mount Gravatt | Brisbane South-east | 1874 | 27.5331°S 153.0727°E | Listed on the Brisbane Heritage Register |
| Mount Gravatt East State School | Mount Gravatt East | Brisbane South-east | 1955 | 27.5344°S 153.0949°E | |
| Mount Mee State School | Mount Mee | North-west Rural | 1884 | 27.0804°S 152.7711°E | 1368 Mt Mee Road. |
| Mount Nebo State School | Mount Nebo | West Rural | 1931 | 27.3965°S 152.7836°E | |
| Mackenzie State Primary School | Mackenzie | Brisbane South-east | 1955 | 27.5458°S 153.1242°E | |
| Mount Samson State School | Samsonvale | West Rural | 1880 | 27.2940°S 152.8511°E | |
| Mount Warren Park State School | Mount Warren Park | Logan | 1981 | 27.7269°S 153.2045°E | |
| Murarrie State School | Murarrie | Brisbane East | 1928 | 27.4618°S 153.1012°E | |
| Narangba State School | Narangba | Moreton Bay | 1910 | 27.2055°S 152.9609°E | At 2-20 School Street. |
| Narangba Valley State School | Narangba | Moreton Bay | 2005 | 27.1744°S 152.9334°E | |
| Nashville State School | Brighton | Bayside North | 1960 | 27.3068°S 153.0509°E | |
| New Farm State School | New Farm | Brisbane Central | 1901 | 27.4605°S 153.0453°E | Listed on the Queensland Heritage Register |
| Newmarket State School | Newmarket | Brisbane North | 1904 | 27.4321°S 153.0041°E | Listed on the Queensland Heritage Register |
| Norman Park State School | Norman Park | Brisbane East | 1900 | 27.4743°S 153.0624°E | Listed on the Queensland Heritage Register |
| Norris Road State School | Bracken Ridge | Brisbane North | 1977 | 27.3176°S 153.0251°E | |
| Northgate State School | Northgate | Brisbane North-east | 1959 | 27.3980°S 153.0710°E | |
| Nundah State School | Nundah | Brisbane North-east | 1865 | 27.4026°S 153.0582°E | Listed on the Queensland Heritage Register |
| Oakleigh State School | Ashgrove | Brisbane North | 1934 | 27.4359°S 152.9855°E | At 47 Buxton Street. |
| Ormiston State School | Ormiston | Redland | 1872 | 27.5169°S 153.2574°E | |
| Oxley State School | Oxley | Brisbane South-west | 1870 | 27.5637°S 152.9807°E | |
| Pallara State School | Pallara | Brisbane South | 1959 | 27.6298°S 152.9941°E | Opened as Ritchie Road State School, later renamed Pallara State School. At 39 Ritchie Road. |
| Park Ridge State School | Park Ridge | Logan | 1895 | 27.7006°S 153.0398°E | |
| Patricks Road State School | Ferny Hills | Moreton Bay | 1977 | 27.3933°S 152.9348°E | At 238-256 Patricks Road. |
| Payne Road State School | The Gap | Brisbane West | 1970 | 27.4482°S 152.9511°E | |
| Petrie State School | Petrie | Moreton Bay | 1874 | 27.2681°S 152.9725°E | |
| Petrie Terrace State School | Paddington | Brisbane Central | 1868 | 27.4600°S 153.0098°E | Split-sex until May 1953, Originally in Petrie Terrace |
| Pullenvale State School | Pullenvale | West Rural | 1874 | 27.5334°S 152.8957°E | |
| Pumicestone State School | Caboolture | Moreton Bay | 2017 | 27.0572°S 152.9575°E | At 75 Cottrill Road. |
| Raceview State School | Raceview | Ipswich | 1901 | 27.6408°S 152.7832°E | At 96 Wildey Street. |
| Rainworth State School | Bardon | Brisbane North | 1928 | 27.4675°S 152.9852°E | |
| Redbank State School | Redbank | Ipswich | 1865 | 27.6031°S 152.8647°E | |
| Redbank Plains State School | Redbank Plains | Ipswich | 1874 | 27.6479°S 152.8515°E | |
| Redland Bay State School | Redland Bay | Redland | 1881 | 27.6186°S 153.2930°E | |
| Regents Park State School | Regents Park | Logan | 1994 | 27.6822°S 153.0347°E | |
| Richlands East State School | Inala | Brisbane South-west | 1967 | 27.5979°S 152.9678°E | At 99 Poinsettia Street. |
| Ripley Central State School | Ripley | Ipswich | 2023 | 27.6718°S 152.7796°E | Located at 103 Binnies Road. |
| Ripley Valley State School | South Ripley | Ipswich | 2020 | 27.6956°S 152.8131°E | Located at 110 Botany Drive. |
| Riverview State School | Riverview | Ipswich | 1977 | 27.6032°S 152.8470°E | |
| Robertson State School | Robertson | Brisbane South | 1980 | 27.5651°S 153.0557°E | |
| Rochedale State School | Rochedale | Brisbane South-east | 1931 | 27.5805°S 153.1260°E | |
| Rochedale South State School | Rochedale South | Logan | 1979 | 27.5907°S 153.1295°E | |
| Rocklea State School | Rocklea | Brisbane South | 1885 | 27.5468°S 153.0118°E | |
| Runcorn State School | Sunnybank | Brisbane South | 1901 | 27.5870°S 153.0617°E | |
| Runcorn Heights State School | Runcorn | Brisbane South | 1975 | 27.6046°S 153.0686°E | |
| Russell Island State School | Russell Island | Redland | 1916 | approx 27.6698°S 153.3845°E | The original school building was relocated from Pine Ridge (near Southport) to the eastern side of Centre Road in almost the centre of the island. |
| Russell Island State School | Russell Island | Redland | 1927 | 27.6515°S 153.3813°E | In 1927 following a vote by residents, the school was relocated to its present site in the north of the island, 38–64 High Street. The school continues to use the original building, albeit extended and repaired. |
| Salisbury State School | Salisbury | Brisbane South | 1920 | 27.5537°S 153.0326°E | At 19 Cripps Street. |
| Samford State School | Samford Village | West Rural | 1872 | 27.3764°S 152.8815°E | |
| Sandgate State School | Sandgate | Bayside North | 1873 | 27.3209°S 153.0657°E | |
| Scarborough State School | Scarborough | Redcliffe | 1925 | 27.2156°S 153.1109°E | |
| Scenic Shores State School | Redland Bay | Redland | 2024 | 27.6660°S 153.3038°E | At 350-372 Serpentine Creek Road. |
| Serviceton South State School | Inala | Brisbane South-west | 1963 | 27.6060°S 152.9763°E | At 59 Lorikeet Street. |
| Seven Hills State School | Morningside | Brisbane East | 1960 | 27.4793°S 153.0748°E | |
| Seville Road State School | Holland Park | Brisbane South | 1956 | 27.5252°S 153.0723°E | |
| Shailer Park State School | Shailer Park | Logan | 1982 | 27.6597°S 153.1873°E | |
| Sherwood State School | Sherwood | Brisbane West | 1867 | 27.5319°S 152.9844°E | Listed on the Queensland Heritage Register |
| Shorncliffe State School | Shorncliffe | Bayside North | 1919 | 27.3237°S 153.0807°E | |
| Silkstone State School | Silkstone | Ipswich | 1882 | 27.6193°S 152.7846°E | Opened in 1882 as Newtown State School. Relocated about 1914 and renamed Silkstone State School. |
| Somerset Hills State School | Stafford Heights | Brisbane North | 1966 | 27.3977°S 153.0188°E | |
| Spring Mountain State School | Spring Mountain | Ipswich | 2019 | 27.6867°S 152.8912°E | |
| Springfield Central State School | Springfield | Ipswich | 2011 | 27.6969°S 152.9077°E | |
| Springfield Lakes State School | Springfield | Ipswich | 2007 | 27.6700°S 152.9218°E | |
| Springwood Central State School | Springwood | Logan | 1977 | 27.6181°S 153.1299°E | |
| Springwood Road State School | Rochedale South | Logan | 1974 | 27.6071°S 153.1292°E | |
| Stafford State School | Stafford | Brisbane North | 1886 | 27.4117°S 153.0169°E | Listed on the Queensland Heritage Register |
| Stafford Heights State School | Stafford Heights | Brisbane North | 1956 | 27.4009°S 153.0039°E | |
| Strathpine State School | Strathpine | Moreton Bay | 1911 | 27.2932°S 152.9893°E | |
| Strathpine West State School | Strathpine | Moreton Bay | 1981 | 27.3064°S 152.9690°E | |
| Sunnybank State School | Sunnybank | Brisbane South | 1959 | 27.5756°S 153.0515°E | |
| Sunnybank Hills State School | Sunnybank Hills | Brisbane South | 1979 | 27.5941°S 153.0558°E | |
| Taigum State School | Taigum | Brisbane North | 1957 | 27.3485°S 153.0396°E | Formerly Zillmere North until Jan 1995 |
| The Gap State School | The Gap | Brisbane West | 1912 | 27.4429°S 152.9445°E | |
| Thornlands State School | Thornlands | Redland | 1910 | 27.5483°S 153.2623°E | |
| Tingalpa State School | Tingalpa | Brisbane East | 1873 | 27.4735°S 153.1268°E | |
| Tivoli State School | Tivoli | Ipswich | 1875 | 27.5831°S 152.7766°E | |
| Toowong State School | Toowong | Brisbane West | 1880 | 27.4818°S 152.9891°E | Listed on the Queensland Heritage Register |
| Tullawong State School | Caboolture | Moreton Bay | 1993 | 27.0700°S 152.9323°E | At 60–94 Smiths Road. |
| Undurba State School | Murrumba Downs | Moreton Bay | 1978 | 27.2628°S 153.0078°E | |
| Upper Brookfield State School | Upper Brookfield | West Rural | 1916 | 27.4784°S 152.8688°E | |
| Upper Mount Gravatt State School | Upper Mount Gravatt | Brisbane South-east | 1929 | 27.5566°S 153.0797°E | Unofficially established the suburb of Upper Mount Gravatt. |
| Veresdale Scrub State School | Veresdale Scrub | | 1899 | 27.9218°S 153.0171°E | |
| Victoria Point State School | Victoria Point | Redland | 1877 | 27.5833°S 153.2963°E | At 274 Colburn Avenue (corner of School Road). |
| Vienna Woods State School | Alexandra Hills | Redland | 1985 | 27.5267°S 153.2299°E | |
| Virginia State School | Virginia | Brisbane North | 1920 | 27.3836°S 153.0612°E | Listed on the Queensland Heritage Register. |
| Wamuran State School | Wamuran | Moreton Bay | 1921–1967 | | At 2 North Road. |
| Wamuran State School | Wamuran | Moreton Bay | 1967- | 27.0407°S 152.8618°E | At 1066–1086 D'Aguilar Highway. |
| Warrigal Road State School | Eight Mile Plains | Brisbane South-east | 1979 | 27.5866°S 153.0847°E | |
| Waterford State School | Waterford | Logan | 1869 | 27.6957°S 153.1447°E | Formerly Logan No.2 Provisional. Renamed Jul 1871. |
| Waterford West State School | Waterford West | Logan | 1976 | 27.6903°S 153.1322°E | |
| Watson Road State School | Acacia Ridge | Brisbane South | 1967 | 27.5929°S 153.0183°E | Initially known as Acacia Ridge South State School before opening |
| Wavell Heights State School | Wavell Heights | Brisbane North | 1948 | 27.3902°S 153.0382°E | |
| Wellers Hill State School | Tarragindi | Brisbane South | 1926 | 27.5260°S 153.0469°E | |
| Wellington Point State School | Wellington Point | Redland | 1887 | 27.4908°S 153.2396°E | |
| West End State School | West End | Brisbane Inner South | 1875 | 27.4802°S 153.0080°E | |
| Wilston State School | Wilston | Brisbane North | 1920 | 27.4280°S 153.0153°E | Listed on the Queensland Heritage Register |
| Windaroo State School | Windaroo | Logan | 1992 | 27.7330°S 153.1958°E | |
| Windsor State School | Windsor | Brisbane North | 1865 | 27.4310°S 153.0301°E | |
| Wishart State School | Wishart | Brisbane South-east | 1964 | 27.5501°S 153.0949°E | |
| Wondall Heights State School | Manly West | Brisbane Bayside | 1966 | 27.4641°S 153.1594°E | |
| Woodford State School | Woodford | Moreton Bay | 1882 | 26.9617°S 152.7806°E | Prep-Year 10. At 171 Archer Street. Opened 1882 as Durundur Provisional School, renamed Woodford in 1885. |
| Woodhill State School | Woodhill | Jimboomba | 1873 | 27.8933°S 152.9740°E | |
| Wood Links State School | Collingwood Park | Ipswich | 2011 | 27.6300°S 152.8528°E | |
| Woodridge State School | Woodridge | Logan | 1924 | 27.6403°S 153.1043°E | Provisional until 1932 |
| Woodridge North State School | Woodridge | Logan | 1967 | 27.6263°S 153.1063°E | |
| Wooloowin State School | Wooloowin | Brisbane North | 1914 | 27.4174°S 153.0371°E | |
| Wynnum State School | Wynnum | Brisbane Bayside | 2011 | 27.4407°S 153.1603°E | Amalgamation of Wynnum Central, Wynnum North and Lindum State School |
| Wynnum West State School | Wynnum West | Brisbane Bayside | 1922 | 27.4549°S 153.1543°E | |
| Yarrabilba State School | Yarrabilba | Logan | 2018 | 27.8042°S 153.1144°E | |
| Yeronga State School | Yeronga | Brisbane South | 1885 | 27.5204°S 153.0198°E | |
| Yugumbir State School | Regents Park | Logan | 1986 | 27.6763°S 153.0495°E | |
| Zillmere State School | Zillmere | Brisbane North | 1877 | 27.3642°S 153.0383°E | |

=== State high schools and colleges ===
| Name | Suburb | Area | Opened | Coordinates | Notes |
|---|---|---|---|---|---|
| Albany Creek State High School | Albany Creek | Moreton Bay | 1982 | 27.3571°S 152.9685°E | |
| Alexandra Hills State High School | Alexandra Hills | Redland | 1987 | 27.5234°S 153.2142°E | |
| Aspley State High School | Aspley | Brisbane North | 1963 | 27.3569°S 153.0245°E | Initially known as Zillmere State High School before opening |
| Aviation High School | Hendra | Brisbane North-east | 1963 | 27.4137°S 153.0645°E | Formerly Hendra State High School until January 1994, then Hendra Secondary College until January 2007. |
| Balmoral State High School | Balmoral | Brisbane East | 1958 | 27.4561°S 153.0731°E | |
| Beenleigh State High School | Beenleigh | Logan | 1963 | 27.7142°S 153.2052°E | |
| Bracken Ridge State High School | Bracken Ridge | Brisbane North | 1967 | 27.3074°S 153.0439°E | Formerly Nashville State High School until September 2000 |
| Bray Park State High School | Bray Park | Moreton Bay | 1987 | 27.3004°S 152.9624°E | |
| Bremer State High School | Silkstone | Ipswich | 1959 | 27.6328°S 152.7544°E | |
| Bribie Island State High School | Bongaree | Bribie Island | 1989 | 27.0830°S 153.1665°E | |
| Brisbane Bayside State College | Wynnum West | Brisbane Bayside | 2010 | 27.4625°S 153.1505°E | |
| Brisbane South State Secondary College | Dutton Park | Brisbane Inner South | 2021 | 27.4959°S 153.0266°E | Located at 179 Annerley Road. |
| Brisbane State High School | South Brisbane | Brisbane Inner South | 1921 | 27.4817°S 153.0186°E | |
| Browns Plains State High School | Browns Plains | Logan | 1985 | 27.6701°S 153.0538°E | |
| Bundamba State Secondary College | Bundamba | Ipswich | 1970 | 27.6036°S 152.8096°E | Formerly Bundamba State High School until Jan 2003 |
| Burpengary State Secondary College | Burpengary | Moreton Bay | 2015 | 27.1718°S 152.9775°E | |
| Caboolture State High School | Caboolture | Moreton Bay | 1961 | 27.0835°S 152.9604°E | At 7–69 Lee Street. |
| Calamvale Community College | Calamvale | Brisbane South | 2002 | 27.6257°S 153.0431°E | P–12. |
| Capalaba State College | Capalaba | Redland | 2005 | 27.5362°S 153.1899°E | P–12. Merger of Capalaba State High School and Capalaba State School |
| Cavendish Road State High School | Holland Park | Brisbane South | 1951 | 27.5167°S 153.0729°E | |
| Centenary State High School | Jindalee | Centenary Suburbs | 1999 | 27.5376°S 152.9400°E | |
| Cleveland District State High School | Cleveland | Redland | 1962 | 27.5299°S 153.2610°E | | |
| Clontarf Beach State High School | Clontarf | Redcliffe | 1950 | 27.2491°S 153.0859°E | |
| Coorparoo Secondary College | Coorparoo | Brisbane East | 1963 | 27.4857°S 153.0530°E | Formerly Coorparoo State High School until January 1994 |
| Corinda State High School | Corinda | Brisbane West | 1960 | 27.5449°S 152.9864°E | |
| Craigslea State High School | Chermside West | Brisbane North | 1975 | 27.3825°S 153.0152°E | |
| Dakabin State High School | Dakabin | Moreton Bay | 1978 | 27.2299°S 152.9793°E | |
| Deception Bay State High School | Deception Bay | Moreton Bay | 1992 | 27.2013°S 153.0309°E | |
| Earnshaw State College | Banyo | Brisbane North-east | 2003 | 27.3783°S 153.0818°E | P–12. Merger of Banyo State High School and Nudgee State School |
| Everton Park State High School | Everton Park | Brisbane North | 1961 | 27.4082°S 152.9975°E | Initially known as Stafford State High School before opening |
| Ferny Grove State High School | Ferny Grove | Brisbane North-west | 1980 | 27.4070°S 152.9340°E | |
| Flagstone State Community College | Jimboomba | Jimboomba | 2002 | 27.8074°S 152.9555°E | |
| Forest Lake State High School | Forest Lake | Brisbane South-west | 2001 | 27.6242°S 152.9722°E | |
| Fortitude Valley State Secondary College | Fortitude Valley | Brisbane North | 2020 | 27.4527°S 153.0360°E | |
| Glenala State High School | Durack | Brisbane South-west | 1996 | 27.5859°S 152.9804°E | Merger of Inala State High School and Richlands State High School |
| Holland Park State High School | Holland Park West | Brisbane South | 1971 | 27.5304°S 153.0590°E | |
| Indooroopilly State High School | Indooroopilly | Brisbane West | 1954 | 27.5011°S 152.9851°E | Listed on the Queensland Heritage Register |
| Ipswich State High School | Brassall | Ipswich | 1951 | 27.5912°S 152.7462°E | At 1 Hunter Street. |
| Kedron State High School | Kedron | Brisbane North | 1956 | 27.4152°S 153.0394°E | |
| Kelvin Grove State College | Kelvin Grove | Brisbane Central | 2002 | 27.4496°S 153.0136°E | P–12. Merger of Kelvin Grove State School and Kelvin Grove State High School |
| Kenmore State High School | Kenmore | Brisbane West | 1972 | 27.5083°S 152.9281°E | |
| Kingston State College | Kingston | Logan | 1977 | 27.6666°S 153.1116°E | Formerly Kingston State High School until November 1999, renamed again in 2016. |
| Loganlea State High School | Loganlea | Logan | 1981 | 27.6739°S 153.1435°E | |
| Mabel Park State High School | Slacks Creek | Logan | 1984 | 27.6398°S 153.1291°E | |
| MacGregor State High School | Macgregor | Brisbane South-east | 1969 | 27.5661°S 153.0767°E | |
| Mango Hill State Secondary College | Mango Hill | Moreton Bay | 2020 | 27.2433°S 153.0414°E | |
| Mansfield State High School | Mansfield | Brisbane South-east | 1974 | 27.5452°S 153.1059°E | |
| Marsden State High School | Waterford West | Logan | 1987 | 27.6848°S 153.1113°E | |
| Milpera State High School | Chelmer | Brisbane West | 1998 | 27.5137°S 152.9776°E | |
| Mitchelton State High School | Mitchelton | Brisbane North-west | 1956 | 27.4119°S 152.9661°E | |
| Morayfield State High School | Morayfield | Moreton Bay | 1981 | 27.1085°S 152.9544°E | |
| Mount Gravatt State High School | Mount Gravatt | Brisbane South-east | 1960 | 27.5358°S 153.0733°E | |
| Murrumba State Secondary College | Murrumba Downs | Moreton Bay | 2012 | 27.2594°S 153.0073°E | |
| Narangba Valley State High School | Narangba | Moreton Bay | 2000 | 27.1740°S 152.9426°E | |
| North Lakes State College | North Lakes | Moreton Bay | 2002 | 27.2373°S 153.0249°E | P–12. |
| Park Ridge State High School | Park Ridge | Logan | 1991 | 27.7007°S 153.0349°E | |
| Pine Rivers State High School | Strathpine | Moreton Bay | 1964 | 27.2965°S 152.9884°E | |
| Queensland Academy for Creative Industries | Kelvin Grove | Brisbane Central | 2007 | 27.4530°S 153.0145°E | Specialist 10–12 |
| Queensland Academy for Science, Mathematics and Technology | Toowong | Brisbane West | 2007 | 27.4871°S 152.9796°E | Specialist 10–12; on former Toowong College site. |
| Redbank Plains State High School | Redbank Plains | Ipswich | 1987 | 27.6516°S 152.8683°E | |
| Redcliffe State High School | Redcliffe | Moreton Bay | 1958 | 27.2233°S 153.1102°E | |
| Ripley Valley State Secondary College | South Ripley | Ipswich | 2020 | 27.6942°S 152.8103°E | Located on the corner of Providence Parade and Parkway Avenue. |
| Rochedale State High School | Rochedale | Brisbane South-east | 1983 | 27.5859°S 153.1127°E | |
| Runcorn State High School | Runcorn | Brisbane South | 1986 | 27.5931°S 153.0765°E | |
| Sandgate District State High School | Deagon | Bayside North | 1959 | 27.3293°S 153.0560°E | |
| Shailer Park State High School | Shailer Park | Logan | 1980 | 27.6631°S 153.1876°E | |
| Springfield Central State High School | Springfield | Ipswich | 2011 | 27.6907°S 152.9092°E | |
| Springwood State High School | Springwood | Logan | 1977 | 27.6127°S 153.1356°E | |
| Stretton State College | Stretton | Brisbane South | 2006 | 27.6393°S 153.0561°E | P–12. |
| Sunnybank State High School | Sunnybank | Brisbane South | 1963 | 27.5765°S 153.0584°E | |
| The Gap State High School | The Gap | Brisbane West | 1960 | 27.4455°S 152.9503°E | |
| Tullawong State High School | Caboolture | Moreton Bay | 1994 | 27.0698°S 152.9287°E | At 22-70 Del Rosso Road. |
| Victoria Point State High School | Victoria Point | Redland | 1997 | 27.5943°S 153.2854°E | At 93–131 Benfer Road. |
| Wavell State High School | Wavell Heights | Brisbane North | 1959 | 27.3981°S 153.0378°E | |
| Wellington Point State High School | Wellington Point | Redland | 1988 | 27.4910°S 153.2298°E | |
| Whites Hill State College | Camp Hill | Brisbane East | 2002 | 27.5003°S 153.0824°E | P–12. Merger of Camp Hill State High School, Whites Hill State School and Xavier Special School. |
| Windaroo Valley State High School | Bahrs Scrub | Logan | 1994 | 27.7405°S 153.1896°E | |
| Woodcrest State College | Springfield | Ipswich | 1998 | 27.6574°S 152.9210°E | Formerly Springfield State School until January 2000 |
| Woodridge State High School | Logan Central | Logan | 1972 | 27.6427°S 153.0987°E | |
| Wynnum State High School | Wynnum | Brisbane Bayside | 1942 | 27.4544°S 153.1770°E | |
| Yarrabilba State Secondary College | Yarrabilba | Logan | 2020 | 27.8078°S 153.1196°E | |
| Yeronga State High School | Yeronga | Brisbane South | 1960 | 27.5171°S 153.0228°E | |

=== Other state schools ===
This includes special schools (schools for disabled children) and schools for specific purposes.

| Name | Suburb | Area | Opened | Coordinates | Notes |
|---|---|---|---|---|---|
| Aspley Special School | Aspley | Brisbane North | 1973 | | |
| Barrett Adolescent Centre Special School | Wacol | Brisbane South-west | 1985 | | For juvenile inmates. |
| Beenleigh Special School | Mount Warren Park | Logan | 1981 | | |
| Brisbane School of Distance Education | Coorparoo | Brisbane East | 1989 | | Sharing campus with Coorparoo Secondary College (since 2011) |
| Brisbane Youth Education and Training Centre | Wacol | Brisbane South-west | 2001 | | For juvenile inmates. Merger of John Oxley School and Sir Leslie Wilson School. |
| Caboolture Special School | Caboolture South | Moreton Bay | 1980 | | |
| Calamvale Special School | Calamvale | Brisbane South | 1985 | | |
| Claremont Special School | Silkstone | Ipswich | 1986 | | |
| Darling Point Special School | Manly | Brisbane Bayside | 1958 | | |
| Geebung Special School | Geebung | Brisbane North | 1986 | 27.3785°S 153.0509°E | At 69 Buhot Street East (corner of Beau Vista Street). |
| Goodna Special School | Goodna | Ipswich | 1975 | | |
| Ipswich Special School | Ipswich | Ipswich | 1958 | | |
| Ipswich West Special School | West Ipswich | Ipswich | 1973 | 27.6195°S 152.7518°E | At 12 Omar Street with entrance on Tiger Street |
| Kuraby Special School | Kuraby | Brisbane South-east | 1978 | | |
| Queensland Children's Hospital School | South Brisbane | Brisbane Inner South | 1981 | 27.4844°S 153.0272°E | The school has its headquarters on Raymond Terrace but has a number of campuses in Brisbane and regional outreach. Known as Mater Hospital Special School from 1981 to 2014, when it was renamed as Lady Cilento Hospital School, and then was renamed Queensland Children's Hospital School in 2019. |
| Lee Street State Special School | Caboolture | Moreton Bay | 2020 | 27.0848°S 152.9636°E | A special education secondary school.operating from the campus of Caboolture State High School at 7–69 Lee Street. |
| Logan City Special School | Logan Central | Logan | 1972 | | |
| Mater Hospital Special School | South Brisbane | Brisbane Inner South | 1977 | | |
| Mitchelton Special School | Mitchelton | Brisbane North-west | 1971 | | |
| Mount Gravatt Special School | Mount Gravatt | Brisbane South-east | 1971 | | |
| Mount Ommaney Special School | Mount Ommaney | Centenary Suburbs | 1992 | | |
| Narbethong Special School | Woolloongabba | Brisbane Inner South | 1963 | | |
| Nursery Road Special School | Mount Gravatt | Brisbane South-east | 1986 | | Formerly Mount Gravatt West until 2010 |
| Pine Rivers Special School | Lawnton | Moreton Bay | 1986 | | |
| Red Hill Special School | Red Hill | Brisbane Central | 1986 | | |
| Redcliffe Special School | Redcliffe | Redcliffe | 1964 | | |
| Redland District Special School | Thornlands | Redland | 1975 | | |
| Royal Children's Hospital Special School | Herston | Brisbane Central | 1919 | | |
| Sunnybank Special School | Sunnybank | Brisbane South | 1986 | | Formerly R. J. Andrews Special until April 1997 |
| Tennyson Special School | Tennyson | Brisbane South | 1973 | | Formerly Tennyson State School |
| Western Suburbs Special School | Inala | Brisbane South-west | 1968 | 27.5868°S 152.9776°E | Formerly Inala Special until 2007. At 78 Glenala Road. |
| Woody Point Special School | Woody Point | Redcliffe | 1978 | | |

=== Defunct state schools ===
| Name | Suburb | Area | Opened | Closed | Coords | Notes |
|---|---|---|---|---|---|---|
| Acacia Ridge State High School | Acacia Ridge | Brisbane South | 1971 | 1997 | 27.5795°S 153.0155°E | Located at 67 Nyngam Street. Merged into Nyanda State High School. |
| Amity Point State School | Amity Point | North Stradbroke | 1951 | 1961 | | |
| Armstrong Creek State School | Armstrong Creek | Moreton Bay | 1900 | 1919 | | The school building was relocated to establish the school in Ocean View. |
| Ascot One-Teacher State School | Ascot | Brisbane North | 1934 | 1973 | | Operated independently for training purposes within the grounds of Ascot State School. |
| Auchenflower Infants' Provisional School | Auchenflower | Brisbane West | 1922 | 1960 | | |
| Bahr's Scrub State School | Bahrs Scrub | Logan | 1932 | 1933 | | |
| Banyo State High School | Banyo | Brisbane North-east | 1954 | 2002 | 27.3793°S 153.0814°E | Merged with Nudgee State School to createEarnshaw State College, which operates from the Banyo State High School site at 438 Earnshaw Road (corner of Tufnell Road). |
| Baroona Special School | Petrie Terrace | Brisbane Central | 1960 | 1995 | 27.4662°S 153.0111°E | On grounds of former Petrie Terrace Infants at 1 Hale Street, previous known as Petrie Terrace School, Petrie Terrace Opportunity School, Baroona Opportunity School. Now the Albert Park Flexi School. Listed on the Queensland Heritage Register. |
| Basin State School | Wamuran Basin | Moreton Bay | 1920 | 1957 | 27.0458°S 152.8262°E | Unofficially known as Wamuran Basin State School. It was at 4 R Sampson Road. |
| Blackstone State School | Blackstone | Ipswich | 1887 | 2009 | 27.626°S 152.804°E | Located at 14 Hill Street. The school's website was archived. |
| Bowen Hills Special School | Bowen Hills | Brisbane Central | 1986 | 1987 | | |
| Bracalba State School | Bracalba | Moreton Bay | 1892 | 1941 | approx 27.01151°S 152.84080°E | Opened as Ferndale Provisional School and changed name in 1913. Its approximate location was 9–13 Busse Road. |
| Breakfast Creek State School | Newstead | Brisbane Central | 1890 | 1961 | | |
| Brisbane Normal School | Brisbane | Brisbane Central | 1860 | 1927 | | Opened as Brisbane National School, but was known as Brisbane Normal School from 1862. Became split sex on 14 August 1860. Infants separated in 1862. Was also referred to as Brisbane Central School at times during the early period. From approx. 1880 it became three distinct schools: Brisbane Central Boys' School, Brisbane Central Girls' School and Brisbane Central Infants' School. In 1906 the girls' and infants' schools combined. In 1920 the Boys' and Girls' schools combined and it became known as the Central Practising School due to its extensive use for teacher training from the nearby Turbot Street Teacher Training College. After its closure in 1927, the students were mostly relocated to the Leichhardt Street State School (now the Brisbane Central State School). |
| Brisbane North Intermediate School | Kelvin Grove | Brisbane Central | 1935 | 1953 | | |
| Brisbane South Intermediate School | South Brisbane | Brisbane Inner South | 1929 | 1953 | | Also known as South Brisbane Intermediate School. |
| Brisbane South State School | South Brisbane | Brisbane Inner South | 1863 | 1963 | | Also known as South Brisbane State School. Split sex until 1929. |
| Bundamba Upper State School | South Ripley | Ipswich | 1874 | 1930 | 27.7211°S 152.8174°E | Renamed Ripley State School in 1909. Located at 1166–1176 Ripley Road. |
| Buranda Girls' and Infants' School | Buranda | Brisbane East | 1918 | 1967 | | Amalgamated into Buranda State School. |
| Buranda Senior Special School | Woolloongabba | Brisbane Inner South | 1967 | 1996 | 27.4964°S 153.0424°E | Formerly campus of Buranda State School Located at 21 Martin Street within the grounds of Buranda State School. |
| Bunya State School | Bunya | Moreton Bay | 1875 | 1965 | 27.3660°S 152.9311°E | Located at 550 Bunya Road. |
| Cabbage Creek State School | Lake Manchester | Brisbane / Somerset | 1900 | circa 1919 | approx 27.48309°S 152.73824°E | Opened as Noogoora Provisional School. Located on the southern side of Lake Manchester Road. |
| Calamvale State School | Calamvale | Brisbane South | 1955 | 2001 | | Merged into Calamvale Community College |
| Camp Hill State High School | Camp Hill | Brisbane East | 1957 | 2001 | 27.5016°S 153.0826°E | Located on the northeast corner of Burn Street and Samuel Street. Merged into Whites Hill State College. |
| Camp Hill State Infants School | Camp Hill | Brisbane East | 1951 | 2006 | 27.4913°S 153.0786°E | Merged into Camp Hill State School in July 2006. Located at 45 Wiles Street (immediately adjacent to Camp Hill State School). The infant school's website was archived. |
| Camp Mountain State School | Camp Mountain | Moreton Bay | circa 1929 | circa 1955 | approx 27.4014°S 152.8643°E | Located on Upper Camp Mountain Road. |
| Capalaba State High School | Capalaba | Redland | 1978 | 2004 | 27.5361°S 153.1960°E | Located at 53–59 School Road, immediately adjacent to Capalaba State School. The two schools merged into Capalaba State College and operate from the combined original sites. |
| Capalaba State School | Capalaba | Redland | 1874 | 2004 | 27.5357°S 153.1904°E | Located at 5A–51 School Road, immediately adjacent to Capalaba State High School. The two schools merged into Capalaba State College and operate from the combined original sites. |
| Cedar Grove State School | Cedar Grove | Logan | 1923 | 1965 | 27.8622°S 152.9975°E | The former Martindale school building (now in Riverbend) was relocated to 19–29 Cedar Grove Road, Cedar Grove. |
| Chambers Flat State School | Chambers Flat | Logan | 1890 | 1921 | 27.7483°S 153.0879°E | Located on a 10-acre (4.0 ha) site at 33–51 Holloway Road. |
| Chelmer Special School | Chelmer | Brisbane West | 1978 | 1992 | | |
| Chermside State School | Chermside | Brisbane North | 1900 | 1996 | 27.3930°S 153.0306°E | Known as Downfall Creek State School until 1903. Located on the north-western corner of the intersection of Gympie Road and Rode Road. |
| Clontarf State School | Clontarf | Redcliffe | 1913 | 1972 | | |
| Closeburn State School | Closeburn | Moreton Bay | 1920 | 1967 | | |
| Commissioner's Flat State School | Commissioners Flat | Moreton Bay | 1912 | 1973 | 26.8666°S 152.8309°E | Located on the eastern side of Cove Road. |
| Coorparoo State Infants School | Coorparoo | Brisbane East | 1960 | 1987 | | |
| Cribb Island State School | Cribb Island | Brisbane North-east | 1919 | 1979 | | Land resumed for Brisbane Airport |
| Dinmore State School | Dinmore | Ipswich | 1891 | 2009 | 27.5937°S 152.8320°E | Located on the south-west corner of River Road and Claydon Street. The school's website was archived. |
| Dundas State School | Dundas, now Lake Wivenhoe | Somerset | circa 1890 | 1942 | approx 27.3229°S 152.6486°E | Opened as Dundass Provisional School, later renamed Dundas Provisional School. Located on the northern side of Kipper Creek Road, now within the neighbouring locality of Lake Wivenhoe. |
| Dutton Park Special School | Dutton Park | Brisbane Inner South | 1936 | 1994 | | |
| Eagleby State School | Eagleby | Logan | 1906 | 1966 | 27.68702°S 153.21806°E | Located at 133 Eagleby Road (27.68702°S 153.21806°E). After closure, the school was purchased for use as a private residence, but was removed circa 2021. The current Eagleby State School opened in 1988 at 222–260 Fryar Road. |
| Eight Mile Plains Special School | Eight Mile Plains | Brisbane South-east | 1980 | 1997 | 27.5766°S 153.0898°E | Co-located with the Multiple Handicapped Association of Queensland (now Multicap) facility for children with multiple disabilities at 303 Padstow Road. |
| Forbes Creek State School | Rush Creek | Moreton Bay | 1880 | 1960 | approx 27.2219°S 152.8801°E | Located just north of the North Pine River in the vicinity of Rush Creek Road; this area is now on the foreshores of Lake Samsonvale. |
| Fortitude Valley Infants School | Fortitude Valley | Brisbane Central | 1888 | 1950 | | Merged into Fortitude Valley State School |
| Fortitude Valley State School | Fortitude Valley | Brisbane Central | 1861 | 2013 | | Was divided into split sex schools until 1950. |
| Gold Creek State School | Brookfield | Brisbane West | 1919 | circa 1936 | 27.4684°S 152.8918°E | Located at 528 Gold Creek Road. |
| Harrison's Pocket State School | Whiteside | Moreton Bay | 1876 | 1937 | 27.261°S 152.910°E | Harrison's Pocket Provisional School opened on 31 January 1876. On 18 February 1884, it became Harrison's Pocket State School. It closed in 1937 due to low student numbers. Instead the children were taken for free by bus to Strathpine State School. The Harrison's Pocket area is now mostly underneath Lake Samsonvale, created by the North Pine Dam which opened in 1976. |
| Hemmant State School | Hemmant | Brisbane East | 1864 | 2010 | 27.4479°S 153.1271°E | Formerly known as Bulimba Creek School and Doughboy Creek School until 1876. Located at 56 Hemmant-Tingalpa Road. The school's website was archived. |
| Highvale State School | Highvale | Moreton Bay | 1921 | 1968 | | Formerly Highlands until 1943 |
| Holland Park Housing Settlement Provisional School | Holland Park | Brisbane South | 1948 | 1956 | | |
| Humpybong State Infants School | Margate | Redcliffe | 1959 | 1997 | | Merged into Humpybong State School |
| Inala State High School | Durack | Brisbane South-west | 1962 | 1995 | 27.5861°S 152.9802°E | Amalgamated with Richlands State High School to create Glenala State High School on the Inala State High School site. Despite the name, Inala State High School was in Durack on the north-east corner of Glenala Road and Hampton Street. |
| Inala West State School | Inala | Brisbane South-west | 1960 | 2009 | 27.5879°S 152.9675°E | Located at 2 Deodor Street (end of Biota Street). The school's website was archived. |
| Ipswich Central Boys State School | Ipswich | Ipswich | 1861 | 1973 | | Merged into Ipswich Central State School |
| John Oxley School | Milton | Brisbane Central | 1994 | 2001 | | Merged into Brisbane Youth Education and Training Centre |
| Junction Park State Infants School | Annerley | Brisbane South | 1948 | 1974 | | Split from, then merged back into, Junction Park State School. |
| Kalangara State School | Stony Creek | Moreton Bay | 1897 | 1963 | 26.9200°S 152.7217°E | Previously known as Durundur Provisional/State School, renamed Kalangara State School in 1920. Located Stony Creek Road. |
| Kangaroo Point State School | Kangaroo Point | Brisbane Inner South | 1861 | 1965 | 27.4753°S 153.0352°E | Originally opened by the Church of England in 1861, but came under the control of the Queensland Government in 1867. For some years, the boys', girls', and infants' schools operated separately but later amalgamated. It closed on 30 June 1965. On the western side of Main Street and River Terace. |
| Kelvin Grove State High School | Kelvin Grove | Brisbane Central | 1961 | 2001 | | Merged into Kelvin Grove State College |
| Kelvin Grove State School | Kelvin Grove | Brisbane Central | 1875 | 2001 | | Merged into Kelvin Grove State College. Separate boys and girls 1887–1950 |
| Kelvin Grove State Infants School | Kelvin Grove | Brisbane Central | 1887 | 1960 | | Formerly Kelvin Park Girls' and Infants' until Jan 1950 |
| Kingston State Infants School | Kingston | Logan | 1976 | 1993 | | |
| Kobble Creek State School | Kobble Creek | Moreton Bay | 1876 | 1954 | | |
| Lacey's Creek State School | Laceys Creek | North-west Rural | 1898 | 1963 | approx 27.2047°S 152.7451°E | Provisional until 1909. Located at 6 Wirths Road. |
| Lindum State School | Wynnum West | Brisbane Bayside | 1954 | 2011 | 27.4375°S 153.1466°E | Amalgamated into Wynnum State School. Located 109 North Street. The school's website was archived. |
| Mabel Park State Infants School | Slacks Creek | Logan | 1978 | 1997 | | Merged into Mabel Park State School |
| Maclean State School | North Maclean | Logan | 1926 | 1963 | 27.7783°S 153.0117°E | Located at 4805–4831 Mount Lindesay Highway. |
| Martindale State School | now Riverbend | Logan | circa 1899 | 1922 | approx 27.8340°S 152.9541°E | Opened circa 1899 as Jimboomba Timber Reserve Provisional School. Renamed 1906 Martindale Provisional School. In 1909 it became Martindale State School. Located in the Gittins Road area. After closure, the school building was relocated to become the Cedar Grove State School. |
| Mayfield State School | King Scrub | Moreton Bay | 1910 | circa 1936 | 27.1702°S 152.8259°E | Located on Mount Mee Road. Not to be confused with the current Mayfield State School which opened in 1956 in Carina, Brisbane. |
| Milpera Special School | Chelmer | Brisbane West | 1984 | 1998 | | |
| Mitchelton State Infants School | Mitchelton | Brisbane North-west | 1952 | 1986 | | Merged into Mitchelton State School |
| Montrose Special School | Taringa | Brisbane West | 1934 | 1937 | 27.4975°S 152.9862°E | The school was at the Montrose Home for Crippled Children at 180–200 Swann Road, extending back to Seven Oaks Street. |
| Montrose Special School | Corinda | Brisbane West | 1937 | 2000 | 27.5433°S 152.9765°E | The school was at the Montrose Home for Crippled Children at 54 Consort Street. |
| Moodlu State School | Moodlu | Moreton Bay | 1884 | 1947 | 27.0587°S 152.9109°E | Opened as Wararba Provisional/State School. Renamed Moodlu in 1911. Located on a 20-acre (8.1 ha) site at 199 Williams Road. The site is now the Caboolture Pony Club. |
| Moorina State School | Moorina | Moreton Bay | 1918 | 1954 | 27.1515°S 152.8778°E | Located on Moorina Road. |
| Moorlands State School | Thornlands | Redland | 1886 | 1975 | | |
| Moorooka State Infants School | Moorooka | Brisbane South | 1959 | 1983 | | Merged into Moorooka State School |
| Mount Mee Banana Settlement State School | Mount Mee | Moreton Bay | 1934 | 1939 | | |
| Mount Pleasant State School | Mount Pleasant | Moreton Bay | 1905 | 1965 | 27.1495°S 152.7699°E | Provisional until 1909. Located approx 259 Mount Brisbane Road. |
| Myrtletown State School | Myrtletown | Brisbane North-east | 1924 | 1971 | 27.3893°S 153.1412°E | It occupied the northern part of the block bounded by Main Beach Road, School Road (now Lewandowski Drive) and Sandmere Street. |
| Neurum Creek State School | Neurum | Moreton Bay | 1880 | 1942 | 26.9649°S 152.6974°E | Located on the east side of Nerum Road, just south of the junction with Stanton Road. |
| New Beith State School | New Beith | Logan | 1916 | 1950 | 27.7425°S 152.9425°E | Located at 606–610 New Beith Road. |
| New Farm Special School | New Farm | Brisbane Central | 1951 | 1994 | | |
| Newmarket State High School | Newmarket | Brisbane North | 1963 | 1996 | 27.4319°S 153.0022°E | Located immediately west of Newmarket State School, extending from Brent Street south towards Banks Street. |
| Newstead Special School | Newstead | Brisbane Central | 1951 | 1996 | | Formerly Fortitude Valley Opportunity School; moved on 28 August 1961 into closed Breakfast Creek State School buildings. |
| North Maclean State School | North Maclean | Logan | 1882 | 1912 | | |
| Nudgee State School | Nudgee | Brisbane North-east | 1875 | 1924 | 27.3875°S 153.0863°E | Opened in 1875 on Nudgee Road (present day address approx 936 Nudgee Road). By 1924 frequent flooding of the school building and growth in the local population led to new school buildings being erected in Banyo. |
| Nudgee State School | Banyo | Brisbane North-east | 1924 | 2002 | 27.3774°S 153.0849°E | Located at 453 Earnshaw Road. Closed in 2002 to be merged with Banyo State School to form Earnshaw State College on the site of the former state high school. "A" Block of the former state school is listed on the Brisbane Heritage Register. The Nudgee State School website was archived. |
| Nudgee Beach State School | Nudgee Beach | Bayside North | 1926 | 1988 | | |
| Nundah State Infants School | Nundah | Brisbane North-east | 1955 | 1974 | | Merged into Nundah State School |
| Nyanda State High School | Salisbury | Brisbane South | 1998 | 2013 | 27.5510°S 153.0222°E | Was formed from a merger of Acacia Ridge and Salisbury State High Schools and located on the site of the former Salisbury State High School on Fairlie Street. |
| Ocean View State School | Ocean View | Moreton Bay | 1922 | 1963 | | The school building was relocated from Armstrong Creek State School. |
| Old Yarranlea State School | Mount Gravatt | Brisbane South-east | 1987 | 2013 | 27.54338°S 153.06555°E | In 1987, the building of the former Yarranlea State School was relocated to the Mount Gravatt campus of Griffith University and reopened as Old Yarranlea State School. Old Yarranlea's website was partially archived. Following its closure in 2013, the building was then taken over by Yarranlea Primary School, a new independent school. |
| Oxley Secondary College | Oxley | Brisbane South-west | 1966 | 2000 | 27.5514°S 152.9693°E | Formerly Oxley State High School until January 1994. Located off Clivenden Avenue. |
| Petrie Terrace State Infants School | Petrie Terrace | Brisbane Central | 1950 | 1960 | | |
| Pinkenba State School | Pinkenba | Brisbane North-east | 1875 | 2008 | 27.4202°S 153.1218°E | Opened as Boggy Creek State School in 1875, renamed Myrtle State School in 1888, then Pinkenba State School. Located at 248 Eagle Farm Road, on the corner of Serpentine Road. The school's website was archived. |
| Primary Correspondence School | West End | Brisbane Inner South | 1922 | 1989 | | Merged to form Brisbane School of Distance Education |
| Queensland School for the Deaf | Buranda | Brisbane East | 1893 | 1988 | | Accommodated blind children as well until 1963 (transferred to Narbethong) |
| Queensland School for Travelling Show Children | across Australia (except Western Australia) | | 2000 | 2012 | | A mobile school for children of families working on the show circuit. Operated from the Brisbane School of Distance Education. |
| Richlands State High School | Richlands | Brisbane South-west | 1970 | 1996 | | Merged into Glenala State High School |
| Richlands State School | Richlands | Brisbane South-west | 1934 | 2010 | 27.5957°S 152.9562°E | Located on the north-east corner of Orchard Road and Old Progress Road. The school's website was archived. |
| Ripley State School | South Ripley | Ipswich | 1874 | 1930 | 27.7211°S 152.8174°E | Originally named Bundamba Upper State School, until renamed Ripley State School in 1909. Located at 1166–1176 Ripley Road. |
| Rocksberg State School | Rocksberg | Moreton Bay | 1893 | 1954 | 27.1063°S 152.8361°E | Located at approx 5 W James Road. |
| Salisbury State High School | Salisbury | Brisbane South | 1954 | 1997 | 27.5509°S 153.0222°E | Located at Fairlie Street. Closed to merge with Acacia Ridge State High School, creating Nyanda State High School on same site as Salisbury State High School |
| Sandgate Special School | Sandgate | Brisbane North | 1960 | 1995 | | |
| Secondary Correspondence School | West End | Brisbane Inner South | 1958 | 1989 | | Merged to form Brisbane School of Distance Education |
| Seventeen Mile Rocks State School | Seventeen Mile Rocks | Centenary Suburbs | 1895 | 1956 | | |
| Sir Leslie Wilson School | Windsor | Brisbane North | 1994 | 2000 | | Merged into Brisbane Youth Education and Training Centre |
| Stafford State Infants School | Stafford | Brisbane North | 1955 | 1977 | | |
| Stony Creek State School | Stony Creek | Moreton Bay | 1877 | 1914 | | |
| Strathpine State Infants School | Strathpine | Moreton Bay | 1978 | 1988 | | Merged into Strathpine State School |
| Tamborine State School | Tamborine | Jimboomba | 1876 | 1970 | | Provisional until 1 March 1909. |
| Taringa State School | Taringa | Brisbane West | 1900 | 1996 | 27.4921°S 152.9810°E | Located between Moggill Road and Morrow Street. |
| Tennyson State School | Tennyson | Brisbane South | 1934 | 1972 | | Became Tennyson Special School. |
| Toorbul State School | Toorbul | Moreton Bay | 1891 | circa 1935 | 27.0433°S 153.0692°E | Located on a 20,310 m^{2} (5.02-acre) site at 1461–1477 Pumicestone Road. |
| Toowong College | Toowong | Brisbane West | 1963 | 2006 | 27.4861°S 152.9790°E | Formerly Toowong State High School until May 2000. Located at 78 Bywong Street. The school's website was archived. The site is now occupied by the Queensland Academy for Science Mathematics and Technology |
| Upper Caboolture State School | Upper Caboolture | Moreton Bay | 1879 | 1920 | | Camp Flat until 1916 |
| Upper North Pine State School | Mount Pleasant | Moreton Bay | 1880 | 1942 | 27.1759°S 152.7970°E | Located on Mount Pleasant Road. |
| Wacol East School for New Australians | Wacol | Brisbane South-west | 1949 | 1963 | | |
| Warner State School | Warner | Moreton Bay | 1876 | circa 1939 | 27.3255°S 152.9623°E | Located on the south-western corner of South Pine Road and Old North Road (now 2 Coorparoo Road). |
| Whites Hill State School | Camp Hill | Brisbane East | 1958 | 2001 | 27.4997°S 153.0834°E | Located on the south-east corner of Burn Street and Abbott Street. Merged into Whites Hill State College |
| Wickham Street State School | Fortitude Valley | Brisbane Central | 1879 | 1880 | | Little is known about this state school. |
| Windsor Special School | Windsor | Brisbane North | 1967 | 1994 | | |
| Windsor State Infants School | Windsor | Brisbane North | 1934 | 1971 | | |
| Wolffdene State School | Wolffdene | Logan | 1892 | 1942 | 27.7838°S 153.1862°E | Located at 810 Beaudesert Beenleigh Road. |
| Wynnum Central State School | Wynnum | Brisbane Bayside | 1896 | 2011 | 27.4442°S 153.1724°E | Amalgamated into Wynnum State School. Located was at 105 Florence Street. Wynnum Central State School's website was archived. |
| Wynnum North State School | Lytton | Brisbane Bayside | 1882 | 1911 | approx 27.4253°S 153.1638°E | Originally Lytton State School until 1911. Located on a 10-acre (4.0 ha) site on a hill overlooking the sea on the Old Brisbane Road, about 1.5 miles (2.4 km) from the Lytton Wharf. |
| Wynnum North State School | Wynnum | Brisbane Bayside | 1911 | 2011 | 27.4339°S 153.1656°E | In 1911, renamed Wynnum North State School and relocated to Wynnum North on the corner of Tingal Road and Prospect Street. Amalgamated into the new Wynnum State School. Wynnum North State School's website was archived. |
| Wynnum North State High School | Wynnum | Brisbane Bayside | 1964 | 2009 | | Replaced by Brisbane Bayside State College |
| Xavier Special School | Coorparoo | Brisbane East | 1970 | 2002 | 27.5066°S 153.0649°E | Established as Xavier Hospital Special School to provide schooling for physically-disabled children in the Xavier Home for Crippled Children. Located at 39 Beresford Terrace. In 2002, become the Special Education Unit of Whites Hill State College. |
| Yeronga State Infants School | Yeronga | Brisbane South | 1871 | 1978 | | Merged into Yeronga State School |

== Private schools ==
=== Catholic primary schools ===
In Queensland, Catholic primary schools are usually (but not always) linked to a parish. Prior to the 1970s, most schools were founded by religious institutes, but with the decrease in membership of these institutes, together with major reforms inside the church, lay teachers and administrators began to take over the schools, a process which was completed by the early 1990s. Brisbane Catholic Education (BCE), headquartered in Dutton Park, was established in 1993 and is responsible for coordinating administration, curriculum and policy across the Catholic school system. Preference for enrolment is given to Catholic students from the parish or local area, although non-Catholic students are admitted if room is available.

| Name | Suburb | Area | M/F/Co-ed | Years | Opened | Coords | Notes |
|---|---|---|---|---|---|---|---|
| All Saints Catholic Primary School | Albany Creek | Moreton Bay | Co-ed | P–6 | 1989 | | |
| Christ the King Catholic Primary School | Deception Bay | Moreton Bay | Co-ed | P–6 | 1979 | | |
| Christ the King Catholic Primary School | Graceville | Brisbane West | Co-ed | P–6 | 1937 | | |
| Guardian Angels Catholic Primary School | Wynnum | Brisbane Bayside | Co-ed | P–6 | 1914 | | |
| Good Shepherd Catholic Primary School | Springfield Lakes | Ipswich | Co-ed | P–6 | | | |
| Holy Cross Primary School | Wooloowin | Brisbane North | Co-ed | P–6 | 1889 | | |
| Holy Family Primary School | Indooroopilly | Brisbane West | Co-ed | P–6 | 1928 | | |
| Holy Spirit Primary School | Bray Park | Moreton Bay | Co-ed | P–6 | 1977 | | |
| Holy Spirit School | New Farm | Brisbane Central | Co-ed | P–6 | 1937 | | |
| Immaculate Heart Primary School | Leichhardt | Ipswich | Co-ed | P–6 | 1967 | | |
| Mary Immaculate Primary School | Annerley | Brisbane South | Co-ed | P–6 | 1917 | 27.5159°S 153.0303°E | At 616 Ipswich Road. |
| Mater Dei Catholic Primary School | Ashgrove | Brisbane North | Co-ed | P–6 | 1951 | | |
| Our Lady Help of Christians School | Hendra | Brisbane North-east | Co-ed | P–6 | 1937 | | |
| Our Lady of Dolours Primary School | Mitchelton | Brisbane North-west | Co-ed | P–6 | 1951 | | |
| Our Lady of Fatima Catholic Primary School | Acacia Ridge | Brisbane South | Co-ed | P–6 | 1954 | | |
| Our Lady of Lourdes Catholic Primary School | Sunnybank | Brisbane South | Co-ed | P–6 | 1952 | | |
| Our Lady of Mount Carmel Primary School | Coorparoo | Brisbane East | Co-ed | P–6 | 1941 | | |
| Our Lady of the Angels Primary School | Wavell Heights | Brisbane North | Co-ed | P–6 | 1950 | | |
| Our Lady of the Assumption Primary School | Enoggera | Brisbane North | Co-ed | P–6 | 1918 | | |
| Our Lady of the Rosary Primary School | Kenmore | Brisbane West | Co-ed | P–6 | 1961 | | |
| Our Lady of the Sacred Heart Primary School | Darra | Brisbane South-west | Co-ed | P–6 | 1937 | | Known as Darra-Jindalee from 1987 to 2008 |
| Our Lady of the Way Primary School | Petrie | Moreton Bay | Co-ed | P–6 | 1964 | | |
| Queen of Apostles School | Stafford | Brisbane North | Co-ed | P–6 | 1962 | | |
| Sacred Heart Primary School | Booval | Ipswich | Co-ed | P–6 | 1931 | | |
| Sacred Heart Primary School | Sandgate | Bayside North | Co-ed | P–6 | 1893 | | |
| St Agatha's Catholic Primary School | Clayfield | Brisbane North-east | Co-ed | P–6 | 1925 | | |
| St Agnes' School | Mount Gravatt | Brisbane South-east | Co-ed | P–6 | 1962 | | |
| St Ambrose's School | Newmarket | Brisbane North | Co-ed | P–6 | 1936 | | |
| St Andrew's Catholic Primary School | Ferny Grove | Brisbane North-west | Co-ed | P–6 | 1985 | | |
| St Ann's School | Redbank Plains | Ipswich | Co-ed | P–6 | | | |
| St Anthony's Catholic Primary School | Alexandra Hills | Redland | Co-ed | P–6 | 1980 | | |
| St Anthony's Parish School | Kedron | Brisbane North | Co-ed | P–6 | 1930 | | |
| St Benedict's Catholic Primary School | Mango Hill | Moreton Bay | Co-ed | P–6 | 2008 | | |
| St Bernadine's Primary School | Regents Park | Logan | Co-ed | P–6 | 1982 | | |
| St Bernard's Catholic School | Upper Mount Gravatt | Brisbane South-east | Co-ed | P–6 | 1953 | | |
| St Brendan's Catholic Primary School | Moorooka | Brisbane South | Co-ed | P–6 | 1929 | | |
| St Catherine's Primary School | Wishart | Brisbane South-east | Co-ed | P–6 | 1973 | | |
| St Clare's Primary School | Yarrabilba | Logan | Co-ed | P–6 | | | |
| St Columba's Primary School | Wilston | Brisbane North | Co-ed | P–6 | 1917 | | |
| St Dympna's Parish School | Aspley | Brisbane North | Co-ed | P–6 | 1963 | | |
| St Edward's Primary School | Daisy Hill | Logan | Co-ed | P–6 | 1978 | | |
| St Elizabeth's Catholic Primary School | Tarragindi | Brisbane South | Co-ed | P–6 | 1958 | | |
| St Finbarr's School | Ashgrove | Brisbane North | Co-ed | P–6 | 1925 | | |
| St Flannan's Catholic Primary School | Fitzgibbon | Brisbane North | Co-ed | P–6 | 1954 | | |
| St Francis Xavier's Primary School | Goodna | Ipswich | Co-ed | P–6 | 1910 | | |
| St Ignatius' School | Toowong | Brisbane West | Co-ed | P–6 | 1903 | | |
| St Ita's Primary School | Dutton Park | Brisbane Inner South | Co-ed | P–6 | 1919 | | |
| St James' Catholic Primary School | Coorparoo | Brisbane East | Co-ed | P–6 | 1916 | | |
| St Joachim's Primary School | Holland Park | Brisbane South-east | Co-ed | P–6 | 1938 | | |
| St John Vianney Primary School | Manly | Brisbane Bayside | Co-ed | P–6 | 1941 | | |
| St Joseph's Catholic Primary School | Bardon | Brisbane West | Co-ed | P–6 | 1938 | | |
| St Joseph's Primary School | Bracken Ridge | Brisbane North | Co-ed | P–6 | 1978 | | |
| St Joseph's Primary School | Corinda | Brisbane North | Co-ed | P–6 | 1917 | | |
| St Joseph's Primary School | Kangaroo Point | Brisbane Inner South | Co-ed | P–6 | 1870 | | |
| St Joseph's Primary School | North Ipswich | Ipswich | Co-ed | P–6 | 1913 | | |
| St Joseph's Primary School | Nundah | Brisbane North-east | Co-ed | P–6 | 1916 | | |
| St Joseph's Tobruk Memorial School | Beenleigh | Logan | Co-ed | P–6 | 1953 | 27.7116°S 153.1996°E | At 53 Kokoda Street. |
| St Kevin's Catholic Primary School | Geebung | Brisbane North | Co-ed | P–6 | 1964 | 27.3738°S 153.0471°E | At 249 Newman Road. |
| St Kieran's Primary School | Brighton | Bayside North | Co-ed | P–6 | 1960 | | |
| St Luke's Catholic Primary School | Capalaba | Redland | Co-ed | P–6 | 1989 | | |
| St Mark's School | Inala | Brisbane South-west | Co-ed | P–6 | 1963 | 27.5941°S 152.9684°E | At 92 Lilac Street. |
| St Martin's Primary School | Carina | Brisbane East | Co-ed | P–6 | 1954 | | |
| St Mary Mackillop Catholic Primary School | Birkdale | Redland | Co-ed | P–6 | 1997 | | Formerly Mary Mackillop Catholic Primary School |
| St Mary's Primary School | Woodend | Ipswich | Co-ed | P–6 | 1864 | 27.6094°S 152.7547°E | At 3 Mary Street. |
| St Mary of the Cross School | Windsor | Brisbane North | Co-ed | P–6 | 1929 | | Formerly Holy Rosary Primary School |
| St Matthew's Primary School | Cornubia | Logan | Co-ed | P–6 | 1984 | | |
| St Oliver Plunkett School | Cannon Hill | Brisbane East | Co-ed | P–6 | 1946 | | |
| St Paul's Primary School | Woodridge | Logan | Co-ed | P–6 | 1969 | | |
| St Peter's Catholic Primary School | Caboolture | Moreton Bay | Co-ed | P–6 | 1951 | | |
| St Peter's Catholic Primary School | Rochedale | Brisbane South-east | Co-ed | P–6 | 1976 | | |
| St Peter Chanel Primary School | The Gap | Brisbane West | Co-ed | P–6 | 1972 | | |
| Sts Peter and Paul's Primary School | Bulimba | Brisbane East | Co-ed | P–6 | 1916 | | |
| St Pius' Catholic Primary School | Banyo | Brisbane North-east | Co-ed | P–6 | 1947 | | |
| St Pius X Catholic Primary School | Salisbury | Brisbane South | Co-ed | P–6 | 1964 | | |
| St Rita's Catholic Primary School | Victoria Point | Redland | Co-ed | P–6 | 1992 | | |
| St Sebastian's Primary School | Yeronga | Brisbane South | Co-ed | P–6 | 1937 | | |
| St Stephen's Catholic Primary School | Algester | Brisbane South | Co-ed | P–6 | 2004 | | |
| St Thomas' Catholic Primary School | Camp Hill | Brisbane East | Co-ed | P–6 | 1929 | | |
| St William's Primary School | Keperra | Brisbane North-west | Co-ed | P–6 | 1957 | | |
| Star of the Sea Primary School | Cleveland | Redland | Co-ed | P–6 | 2009 | | |

=== Catholic high and P–12 schools ===
| Name | Suburb | Area | M/F/Co-ed | Years | Opened | Coords | Notes |
|---|---|---|---|---|---|---|---|
| All Hallows' School | Fortitude Valley | Brisbane Central | F | 5–12 | 1861 | 27.4612°S 153.0326°E | At 547 Ann Street. |
| Ambrose Treacy College | Indooroopilly | Brisbane West | M | 4–12 | 2015 | | Ambrose Treacy College was formerly known as Nudgee Junior. Listed on the Brisbane Heritage Register. |
| Brigidine College | Indooroopilly | Brisbane West | F | 5–12 | 1929 | | |
| Carmel College | Thornlands | Redland | Co-ed | 7–12 | 1993 | | |
| Chisholm Catholic College | Cornubia | Logan | Co-ed | 7–12 | 1992 | | |
| Clairvaux Mackillop College | Upper Mount Gravatt | Brisbane South-east | Co-ed | 7–12 | 1986 | 27.5528°S 153.0778°E | Merger of Clairvaux College and Mackillop Colleges. At Klumpp Road. |
| Holy Spirit College | Fitzgibbon | Brisbane North | Co-ed | 7–12 | 2022 | 27.3487°S 153.0329°E | At 441 Beams Road. |
| Iona College | Wynnum West | Brisbane Bayside | M | 5–12 | 1958 | 27.4384°S 153.1456°E | At 85 North Road. |
| Loreto College | Coorparoo | Brisbane East | F | 5–12 | 1928 | | |
| Lourdes Hill College | Hawthorne | Brisbane East | F | 5–12 | 1916 | 27.4699°S 153.0589°E | At 86 Hawthorne Road. |
| Marist College Ashgrove | Ashgrove | Brisbane North | M | 5–12 | 1940 | | |
| Mary Mackillop College | Nundah | Brisbane North-east | F | 7–12 | 1964 | 27.4038°S 153.0584°E | Formerly Corpus Christi College. At 60 Bage Street. |
| Mount Alvernia College | Kedron | Brisbane North | F | 7–12 | 1956 | | |
| Mt Maria College | Mitchelton | Brisbane North | Co-ed | 7–12 | 2006 | | Split campuses at Enoggera (years 7–9) and Mitchelton (years 10–12). Formerly Mt Maria Senior College and Marcellin College (renamed Mount Maria Junior College in 1991). Listed on the Brisbane Heritage Register. |
| Mt Maria College | Petrie | City of Moreton Bay | Co-ed | 7–12 | 1987 | | Formerly Kolbe College |
| Mount St Michael's College | Ashgrove | Brisbane North | F | 5–12 | 1929 | 27.44441°S 152.98816°E | At 67 Elimatta Drive. |
| Our Lady's College | Annerley | Brisbane South | F | 7–12 | 1964 | 27.5156°S 153.0319°E | At 15 Chester Road. |
| Padua College | Kedron | Brisbane North | M | 5–12 | 1956 | 27.4074°S 153.0251°E | At 80 Turner Road. |
| San Damiano College | Yarrabilba | Logan | Co-ed | 7–12 | 2021 | | |
| San Sisto College | Carina | Brisbane East | F | 7–12 | 1961 | | |
| Southern Cross Catholic College | Scarborough | Redcliffe | Co-ed | P–12 | 1995 | | |
| St Augustine's College | Augustine Heights | Ipswich | Co-ed | P–12 | 2003 | 27.6591°S 152.8870°E | At St Augustine's Drive. |
| St Benedict's College | Mango Hill | Moreton Bay | Co-ed | 7–12 | 2013 | 27.2325°S 153.0341°E | At 21 St Benedict's Close. |
| St Bonaventure's College | Flagstone | Logan | Co-ed | P–12 | 2026 | 27.8004°S 152.9480°E | At 15 College Drive.. The school opens in 2026 offering Prep to Year 3 and Year 7 initially. |
| St Columban's College | Albion | Brisbane | M | | 1928 | 27.4281°S 153.0456°E | Originally a primary school which transitioned into a secondary school. At "Highlands", 451 Sandgate Road. |
| St Columban's College | Caboolture | Moreton Bay | Co-ed | 7–12 | 1997 | 27.0790°S 152.9627°E | In 1997, the school reloctated to Caboolture. At 100 McKean Street. |
| St Edmund's College | Woodend | Ipswich | M | 5–12 | 1892 | 27.6095°S 152.7545°E | At 16 Mary Street. |
| St Eugene College | Burpengary | Moreton Bay | Co-ed | P–12 | 1989 | 27.1525°S 152.9689°E | At 138 Station Road. |
| St Francis' College | Crestmead | Logan | Co-ed | P–12 | 1988 | 27.6915°S 153.0822°E | At 64 Julie Street. |
| St James College | Spring Hill | Brisbane Central | Co-ed | 5–12 | 1868 | | Boys only until 1994. |
| St John Fisher College | Bracken Ridge | Brisbane North | F | 7–12 | 1981 | 27.3133°S 153.0438°E | On John Fisher Drive. |
| St Joseph's College, Gregory Terrace | Spring Hill | Brisbane Central | M | 5–12 | 1875 | 27.4568°S 153.0247°E | Commonly referred to as "Gregory Terrace" or simply "Terrace". At 285 Gregory Terrace. |
| St Joseph's College, Gregory Terrace | Spring Hill | Brisbane Central | M | 5–12 | ???? | 27.4575°S 153.0272°E | The schools has a second campus at 40 Quarry Street. |
| St. Joseph's Nudgee College | Boondall | Brisbane North-east | M | 5–12 | 1891 | 27.3599°S 153.0621°E | At 2199 Sandgate Road. The school's name reflects that its location was historically in Nudgee but changes to suburb boundaries place it now within Boondall. Listed on the Queensland Heritage Register. |
| St Laurence's College | South Brisbane | Brisbane Inner South | M | 5–12 | 1915 | | |
| St Mary's College | Woodend | Ipswich | F | 7–12 | 1863 | 27.6110°S 152.7558°E | At 11 Mary Street. |
| St Patrick's College | Shorncliffe | Bayside North | M | 5–12 | 1952 | 27.3234°S 153.0834°E | At 60 Park Parade. |
| St Peter Claver College | Riverview | Ipswich | Co-ed | 7–12 | 1976 | | |
| St Philomena School | Park Ridge | Logan | Co-ed | P–12 | 1999 | | |
| St Rita's College | Clayfield | Brisbane North-east | F | 5–12 | 1926 | | |
| St Thomas More College | Sunnybank | Brisbane South | Co-ed | 7–12 | 1974 | 27.5721°S 153.0483°E | At the corner of Troughton Road and Turton Street. |
| Stuartholme School | Toowong | Brisbane West | F | 5–12 | 1920 | | Adding year 5 and 6 from 2024 |
| Trinity College | Beenleigh | Logan | Co-ed | 7–12 | 1982 | 27.7104°S 153.1988°E | On Scott Street. |
| Villanova College | Coorparoo | Brisbane East | M | 5–12 | 1948 | 27.4960°S 153.0510°E | At 24 Sixth Avenue. |

=== Independent schools ===
| Name | Suburb | Area | M/F/Co-ed | Years | Affiliation | Opened | Coordinates | Notes |
|---|---|---|---|---|---|---|---|---|
| Angelorum College | Fortitude Valley | Brisbane Central | Co-ed | P–10 | Christian | 2017 | | |
| Anglican Church Grammar School | East Brisbane | Brisbane East | M | P–12 | Anglican | 1912 | | |
| Australian Christian College (Moreton) | Caboolture | Moreton Bay | Co-ed | P–12 | Christian | 1998 | | Formerly Caboolture Christian School |
| Australian International Islamic College | Durack and Woolloongabba | Brisbane South-west | Co-ed | P–12 | Islamic | 2002 | | Formerly Brisbane Muslim School until 2008 |
| Australian Trade College North Brisbane | Scarborough | Redcliffe | Co-ed | 11–12 | | 2007 | | |
| Australian Technology and Agricultural College | North Maclean | Logan | Co-ed | 10–12 | | | | |
| Bethania Lutheran Primary School | Bethania | Logan | Co-ed | P–6 | Lutheran | 1976 | | |
| Bethany Lutheran Primary School | Raceview | Ipswich | Co-ed | P–6 | Lutheran | 1982 | | |
| Birali Steiner School | Beachmere | Moreton Bay | Co-ed | P–10 | Steiner | 2013 | 27.1298°S 153.0509°E | 670 Beachmere Road (corner Newman Road) |
| Brisbane Adventist College | Mansfield | Brisbane South-east | Co-ed | P–12 | Adventist | 1966 | | |
| Brisbane Boys' College | Toowong | Brisbane West | M | P–12 | Uniting | 1902 | | |
| Brisbane Christian College | Salisbury | Brisbane South | Co-ed | P–12 | Christian | 1985 | | |
| Brisbane Grammar School | Spring Hill | Brisbane Central | M | 5–12 | Independent | 1868 | | |
| Brisbane Girls Grammar School | Spring Hill | Brisbane Central | Girls | 7–12 | Independent | 1875 | | |
| Brisbane Independent School | Pullenvale | Brisbane West | Co-ed | P–6 | Independent | 1968 | | |
| Brisbane Montessori School | Fig Tree Pocket | Brisbane West | Co-ed | P–10 | Montessori | 1982 | | |
| Caboolture Montessori School | Caboolture | Moreton Bay | Co-ed | P–6 | Montessori | 1998 | | |
| Calvary Christian College | Carbrook and Springwood | Logan | Co-ed | P–12 | Uniting | 1984 | | Formerly Logan Uniting Primary School |
| Cannon Hill Anglican College | Cannon Hill | Brisbane East | Co-ed | P–12 | Anglican | 1989 | | |
| Canterbury College | Waterford | Logan | Co-ed | P–12 | Anglican | 1987 | | |
| Carmichael College | Morayfield | Moreton Bay | Co-ed | P–12 | Christian | 2015 | | |
| Challenge Trade and Business College | Collingwood Park | Ipswich | Co-ed | 11–12 | | | | |
| Citipointe Christian College | Mansfield | Brisbane South-east | Co-ed | P–12 | Christian | 1978 | | Formerly Christian Outreach College |
| Clayfield College | Clayfield | Brisbane North-east | Co-ed | P–12 | Uniting | 1931 | | Girls only from 7–12 until 2023 |
| Compass Independent School | Kelvin Grove | Brisbane | Co-ed | P–7 | Independent | | | |
| Emmaus College | Jimboomba | Jimboomba | Co-ed | P–12 | Catholic / Anglican /Uniting | 2001 | | |
| Faith Christian School of Distance Education | Woodridge and Underwood | Logan | Co-ed | P–12 | Christian | 2012 | | |
| Faith Lutheran College | Thornlands | Redland | Co-ed | P–12 | Lutheran | 2003 | | |
| Genesis Christian College | Bray Park | Moreton Bay | Co-ed | P–12 | Reformed Christian | 1991 | | |
| Good News Lutheran Primary School | Middle Park | Centenary Suburbs | Co-ed | P–6 | Lutheran | 1984 | | |
| Good Shepherd Christian School | Albany Creek | Moreton Bay | Co-ed | P–12 | Baptist | 2003 | | |
| Grace Lutheran College | Rothwell and Caboolture | Redcliffe | Co-ed | 7–12 | Lutheran | 1978 | | |
| Grace Lutheran Primary School | Clontarf | Redcliffe | Co-ed | P–6 | Lutheran | 1971 | | |
| Groves Christian College | Kingston | Logan | Co-ed | P–12 | Christian | 1999 | | |
| Hillbrook Anglican School | Enoggera | Brisbane North | Co-ed | 7–12 | Anglican | 1987 | | |
| Hills International College | Jimboomba | Jimboomba | Co-ed | P–12 | | 1992 | | Formerly South Queensland International College until 2006 |
| Hubbard's School | Auchenflower | Brisbane West | Co-ed | 10–12 | Independent | 2021 | | |
| Humanitas High School | Fortitude Valley | Brisbane Central | Co-ed | 7–11 | Independent | 2021 | | |
| Hymba Yumba Independent School | Springfield | Ipswich | Co-ed | P–12 | Aboriginal | 2011 | | |
| IES College | Spring Hill | Brisbane Central | Co-ed | 11–12 | | | | |
| Ipswich Adventist School | Brassall | Ipswich | Co-ed | P–6 | Adventist | 1968 | 27.5958°S 152.7458°E | At 56 Hunter Street. |
| Ipswich Grammar School | Woodend | Ipswich | M | P–12 | Independent | 1863 | 27.6141°S 152.7524°E | On Darling Street. |
| Ipswich Girls Grammar School | Ipswich | Ipswich | F & Co-ed | P–12 | Independent | 1892 | 27.6141°S 152.7712°E | At the corner of Queen Victoria Parade and Chermside Road. |
| IQRA College of Brisbane | Berrinba | Logan | Co-ed | P–6 | Islamic | 2022 | | |
| Islamic College of Brisbane | Karawatha | Brisbane South | Co-ed | P–12 | Islamic | 1995 | | |
| John Paul College | Daisy Hill | Logan | Co-ed | P–12 | Catholic/Anglican/Uniting | 1982 | | |
| Kimberley College | Carbrook | Logan | Co-ed | P–12 | | 2000 | | |
| Living Faith Lutheran Primary School | Murrumba Downs | Moreton Bay | Co-ed | P–6 | Lutheran | 2001 | | |
| Moreton Bay Boys' College | Manly West | Brisbane Bayside | M | P–12 | Uniting | 2003 | | |
| Moreton Bay College | Manly West | Brisbane Bayside | F | P–12 | Uniting | 1901 | | |
| Mueller College | Rothwell | Redcliffe | Co-ed | P–12 | Christian | 1990 | | Affiliated with Redcliffe Christian Assembly |
| Music Industry College | Fortitude Valley | Brisbane Central | Co-ed | 11–12 | Independent | | | |
| Northpine Adventist College | Dakabin | Moreton Bay | Co-ed | P–12 | Adventist | 1940 | | |
| Northside Christian College | Everton Park | Brisbane North | Co-ed | P–12 | Christian | 1985 | | Affiliated with Nexus Church (Australian Christian Churches) |
| OneSchool Global | Wakerley | Brisbane East | Co-ed | 3–12 | Plymouth Brethren Christian Church | 2003–2008 | | Opened as the Agnew School in Agnew Street, Norman Park. |
| OneSchool Global | Wakerley | Brisbane East | Co-ed | 3–12 | Plymouth Brethren Christian Church | 2008- | 27.4852°S 153.1417°E | Now at 190 Ingleston Rd, Wakerley. |
| Ormiston College | Ormiston | Redland | Co-ed | P–12 | Christian | 1988 | | |
| Parklands Christian College | Park Ridge | Logan | Co-ed | P–12 | Christian | 2001 | | Affiliated with Parklands Christian Church |
| Pine Community School | Arana Hills | Moreton Bay | Co-ed | P–6 | | 1983 | | |
| Pinnacle Academic College | Kallangur | Moreton Bay | Co-ed | P–6 | | | | |
| Prince of Peace Lutheran College | Everton Hills | Moreton Bay | Co-ed | P–12 | Lutheran | 1984 | | Primary School until 2008. |
| Redeemer Lutheran College | Rochedale | Brisbane South-east | Co-ed | P–12 | Lutheran | 1980 | | |
| Redlands College | Wellington Point | Redland | Co-ed | P–12 | Christian | 1988 | | Associated with Churches of Christ |
| Samford Valley Steiner School | Wights Mountain | West Rural | Co-ed | P–12 | Steiner | 1987 | | |
| Sheldon College | Sheldon | Redland | Co-ed | P–12 | Christian | 1997 | | |
| Somerville House | South Brisbane | Brisbane Inner South | F | P–12 | Uniting | 1899 | 27.4836°S 153.0254°E | At 17 Graham Street. |
| Sinai College | Burbank | Brisbane South-east | Co-ed | P–6 | Jewish | 1990 | | |
| South East Brisbane Steiner School | Thorneside | Brisbane | Co-ed | P–6 | Steiner | | | |
| St Aidan's Anglican Girls' School | Corinda | Brisbane West | F | P–12 | Anglican | 1929 | | |
| St John's Anglican College, Brisbane | Forest Lake | Brisbane South-west | Co-ed | P–12 | Anglican | 1994 | | formerly Forest Lake College |
| St John of Kronstadt Academy | Mount Gravatt | Brisbane South-east | Co-ed | P–4 | Classical Orthodox | 2024 | | |
| St Margaret's Anglican Girls' School | Ascot | Brisbane North-east | F | P–12 | Anglican | 1895 | | |
| St Michael's College | Caboolture | Moreton Bay | Co-ed | P–6 | Christian | 1983 | | |
| St Paul's Anglican School | Bald Hills | Brisbane North | Co-ed | P–12 | Anglican | 1961 | | |
| St Paul's Lutheran Primary School | Caboolture | Moreton Bay | Co-ed | P–6 | Lutheran | 1985 | | |
| St Peters Lutheran College | Indooroopilly | Brisbane West | Co-ed | P–12 | Lutheran | 1945 | | |
| St Peters Lutheran College | Springfield | Ipswich | Co-ed | P–12 | Lutheran | 2008 | | |
| Staines Memorial College | Redbank Plains | Ipswich | Co-ed | P–12 | Christian | 2005 | | |
| Australian Industry Trade College | Spring Hill, Ipswich, and Cleveland | Brisbane | Co-ed | 10–12 | | 2022 | | Formerley Australian Industry Trade College |
| The Lakes College | North Lakes | Moreton Bay | Co-ed | P–12 | Uniting | 2005 | | |
| The Murri School | Acacia Ridge | Brisbane South | Co-ed | P–12 | Aboriginal | 1986 | | Also known as Aboriginal & Islander Independent Community School |
| The Springfield Anglican College | Springfield | Ipswich | Co-ed | P–12 | Anglican | 1998 | | |
| Westside Christian College | Goodna | Ipswich | Co-ed | P–12 | Christian | 1978 | | |
| West Moreton Anglican College | Karrabin | Ipswich | Co-ed | P–12 | Anglican | 1994 | | |
| Wisdom College | Calamvale | Brisbane | Co-ed | P–12 | Islamic | 2010 | | |
| Yarranlea Primary School | Mount Gravatt | Brisbane South-east | Co-ed | P–6 | Independent | 2014 | | |

=== Special and alternative schools ===
| Name | Suburb | Area | M/F/Co-ed | Years | Category | Opened | Coords | Notes |
|---|---|---|---|---|---|---|---|---|
| Albert Park Flexible Learning Centre | Brisbane | Brisbane Central | Catholic alternative | Co-ed | 7–12 | 2006 | | Operated by Edmund Rice Foundation. |
| Alta-1 College | Caboolture | Moreton Bay | alternative | Co-ed | 7-12 | 2000 | | |
| Arethusa College | Burpengary | Moreton Bay | Independent alternative | Co-ed | 7–12 | 2008 | | Operated by the Shaftesbury Foundation |
| Autism Therapy and Education Centre | Brighton | Bayside North | Independent | Co-ed | | 1991 | | Operated by Autism Queensland |
| Autism Therapy and Education Centre | Sunnybank | Brisbane South | Independent | Co-ed | P-12 | 1977 | | Operated by Autism Queensland |
| Carbrook Animal Assisted Learning Centre | Carbrook | Logan | Christian alternative | Co-ed | 7–12 | | | |
| Carinity Education Southside | Sunnybank | Brisbane South | Independent alternative | Co-ed | 7-12 | 1999 | | Originally located in Tarragindi |
| The Centre Education Programme | Kingston | Logan | Catholic alternative | Co-ed | 7–12 | 1992 | | Operated by Edmund Rice Foundation. |
| Connections Community College | Burpengary | Moreton Bay | | Co-ed | | | | |
| Deception Bay Flexible Learning Centre | Deception Bay | Moreton Bay | Catholic alternative | Co-ed | 7–12 | 2006 | | Operated by Edmund Rice Foundation. |
| Edu Space Redcliffe | Redcliffe | City of Brisbane | | Co-ed | 7–10 | | | |
| Hemmant Flexible Learning Centre | Hemmant | City of Brisbane | Catholic alternative | Co-ed | 7–12 | | | Operated by Edmund Rice Foundation. |
| Horizons College of Learning and Enrichment | Caboolture | Moreton Bay | Independent | Co-ed | 7–12 | 2014 | | |
| Inala Flexible Learning Centre | Inala | City of Brisbane | Catholic alternative | Co-ed | 7–12 | 2013 | 27.5978°S 152.9665°E | Operated by Edmund Rice Foundation. At 79 Poinsettia Street. |
| Indie School, Logan | Browns Plains and Thuringowa | Logan | alternative | Co-ed | 9–12 | 2022 | | Operated by Edmund Rice Foundation. |
| Ipswich Flexible Learning Centre | Ipswich | Ipswich | Catholic alternative | Co-ed | 7–12 | 2006 | | Operated by Edmund Rice Foundation. |
| Jabiru Community College | Zillmere | Brisbane | alternative | Co-ed | 10–12 | 2011 | | |
| Kairos Community College | Deception Bay | Moreton Bay | alternative | Co-ed | 10–12 | 2015 | | |
| Mancel College | Fig Tree Pocket | Brisbane West | Independent | Co-ed | P-12 | 1979 | | For severe language disorders, formerley The Glenleighden School |
| Mastery Schools Australia | Springfield | Ipswich | | Co-ed | 4–10 | 2021 | | |
| Ohana College | Meadowbrook | Logan | alternative | Co-ed | 7–12 | | | |
| Omni Academies of Learning | Toowong | Brisbane | alternative | Co-ed | 7–9 | | | |
| The BUSY School | Various | Brisbane | alternative | Co-ed | 11–12 | | | |
| The Sycamore School | Alexandra Hills | Redland | Independent | Co-ed | P–10 | 2017 | | For children with Autism |
| The Younity School | Burpengary | Moreton Bay | Independent | Co-ed | 7-9 | 2024 | | |
| Y School | | | alternative | Co-ed | | | | Operated by the YMCA with a number of campuses with a focus on individual support for students who would struggle in mainstream education. |
| Y School | Acacia Ridge | Brisbane | alternative | Co-ed | 7–9 | | 27.5851°S 153.0261°E | Brisbane South Junior Campus at 2-10 Mannington Road. |
| Y School | Bundamba | Ipswich | alternative | Co-ed | 7-9 | | | Ipswich Junior Campus at the corner of Mary Street and River Road. |
| Y School | Ipswich CBD | Ipswich | alternative | Co-ed | 10-12 | | | Ipswich Senior Campus at 98 Limestone Street. |
| Y School | Kingston | Logan | alternative | Co-ed | 7-9 | | | Logan Junior Campus at 53 Mary Street. |
| Y School | Kingston | Logan | alternative | Co-ed | 10-12 | | | Logan Senior Campus at 41-45 Mary Street. |
| Y School | Mango Hill | Moreton Bay | alternative | Co-ed | 10-12 | | | Moreton Bay Senior campus at 22 Halpine Drive. |
| Y School | North Lakes | Moreton Bay | alternative | Co-ed | 7-9 | | | Moreton Bay Junior Campus at the corner of Lakefield Drive and Endeavour Boulevard. |
| Y School | Parkinson | Brisbane | alternative | Co-ed | 10-12 | | | Brisbane South Senior Campus at 61 Place. |
| | Victoria Point | Redland | alternative | Co-ed | 7-9 & 10-12 | | | Redlands Junior and Senior Campus at 128 Link Road. |
| YOS Lawnton | Lawnton and Riverview | Brisbane | Salvation Army | Co-ed | 10–12 | | | |

=== Defunct private schools ===
| Name | Suburb | Area | Category | Years | Opened | Closed | Coords | Notes |
|---|---|---|---|---|---|---|---|---|
| Autism Therapy and Education Centre | Mount Crosby | West Rural | Independent | Alternative | 1985 | 2003 | | |
| Bayside Christian Academy | Wynnum | Brisbane Bayside | Christian | Primary | 1992 | 1995 | | |
| Christian Life College | Carbrook | Logan | Christian | K–10 | 1979 | 1993 | | |
| Charlotte Mason College | Kallangur | Brisbane | | P–10 | | 2023 | | |
| Clairvaux College | Upper Mount Gravatt | Brisbane South-east | Catholic (boys) | High | 1966 | 1985 | | Merged into Clairvaux Mackillop College |
| De La Salle College | Scarborough | Redcliffe | Catholic (boys) | 4–10 | 1955 | 1994 | | Merged into Southern Cross Catholic College |
| El Shaddai Christian Academy | Narangba | Moreton Bay | Christian | Primary | 1980 | 1983 | | |
| Faith Lutheran Primary School | Victoria Point | Redland | Lutheran | Primary | 1982 | 2002 | | Absorbed into Faith Lutheran College |
| Frawley College | Scarborough | Redcliffe | Catholic | 11–12 | 1973 | 1994 | | Merged into Southern Cross Catholic College |
| John Oxley College | Woolloongabba | Brisbane Inner South | | High | 1996 | 2007 | | |
| Mackillop College | Upper Mount Gravatt | Brisbane South-east | Catholic (girls) | High | 1971 | 1985 | | Merged into Clairvaux Mackillop College] |
| Maridahdi Brisbane Primary School | Wynnum West | Moreton Bay | | P–6 | 2020 | 2023 | | |
| Marist College Rosalie | Paddington | Brisbane Central | Catholic (boys) | High | 1929 | 2008 | | |
| Mary McConnel School | Forest Lake | Brisbane West | Anglican/Uniting Co-ed | P–12 | 1979 | Before 2025 | | As at 2025, not listed as a school in the Queensland Schools Directory. |
| Maryfields Catholic Primary School | Kingston | Logan | Catholic | Primary | 1981 | 2004 | | |
| Mount Carmel College | Wynnum | Brisbane Bayside | Catholic | High | 1957 | 1992 | | |
| Mount Maria College (Junior Campus) | Enoggera | Brisbane North | Catholic | 11–12 | 1979 | 2006 | | Marcellin College until 1978. Now part of Mt Maria College. |
| Mount Maria College (Senior Campus) | Mitchelton | Brisbane North | Catholic | 8–10 | 1978 | 2006 | | Now part of Mt Maria College. |
| Norman Park Uniting Christian School | Norman Park | Brisbane East | Uniting | Primary | 1981 | 1983 | | |
| Our Lady Help of Christians Primary School | Redcliffe | Redcliffe | Catholic | Primary | 1922 | 1994 | | Merged into Southern Cross Catholic College |
| Our Lady of Victories' Primary School | Bowen Hills | Brisbane Central | Catholic | Primary | 1921 | 1966 | | |
| Our Lady of the Sacred Heart College | Corinda | Brisbane West | Catholic | Secondary | 1941 | 1972 | | |
| Redwood College | Burpengary | Moreton Bay | Christian | P–10 | | 2024 | | |
| Rosalie Sacred Heart Parish School | Paddington | Brisbane Central | Catholic | Primary | 1906 | 1995 | | |
| Seton College | Mount Gravatt East | Brisbane South-east | Catholic | 7–12 | 1964 | 2024 | 27.5295°S 153.0922°E | At 1148 Cavendish Road. The school is closing, with new enrolments ceasing at the end of 2024, but existing students will be able to continue their education at the school. |
| Soubirous College | Scarborough | Redcliffe | Catholic (girls) | High | 1951 | 1994 | | Merged into Southern Cross Catholic College |
| St Benedict's College | Wilston | Brisbane North | Catholic | Secondary | 1975 | 1991 | | Merged into Mt Maria Junior College |
| St Bernadette's Primary School | Scarborough | Redcliffe | Catholic | Primary | 1948 | 1994 | | Merged into Southern Cross Catholic College |
| St Brigid's School | Red Hill | Brisbane Central | Catholic | Primary | 1914 | 1989 | | |
| St Cecilia's Convent School | Hamilton | Brisbane North-east | Catholic | Primary | 1917 | 1981 | 27.43368°S 153.07479°E | On the north-east corner of Windsor Street and Hants Street, adjacent to the church. |
| St Edmund's Primary School | Woodend | Ipswich | Catholic | Primary | 1892 | 1991 | | Known as St Mary's Boys 1989–1991 |
| St Joan of Arc Primary School | Herston | Brisbane Central | Catholic | Primary | 1924 | 1968 | | Operated by the Presentation Sisters |
| St John's School | Northgate | Brisbane North-east | Catholic | Primary | 1952 | 1995 | | |
| St John the Baptist's Catholic School | Petrie Terrace | Brisbane Central | Catholic | Primary | 1870 | 1879 | | It was operated by the Sisters of St Joseph of the Sacred Heart out of two cottages in Caxton Street roughly opposite the present St Thomas More Catholic Church. |
| St Mark's Lutheran Primary School | Mount Gravatt East | Brisbane South-east | Lutheran | Primary | 2006 | 2008 | | Absorbed into Redeemer Lutheran College |
| St Patrick's Convent School | Fortitude Valley | Brisbane Central | Catholic | Primary | 1889 | 1982 | | |
| St Stephens School | Brisbane CBD | Brisbane Central | Catholic (girls) | Primary | 1892 | 1965 | 27.4691°S 153.0288°E | At 172 Charlotte Street. |
| St Thomas Aquinas School | St Lucia | Brisbane West | Catholic | Primary | 1948 | 1967 | | |
| St Ursula's College | Dutton Park | Brisbane | Catholic (girls) | High | 1919 | 1975 | | |
| St Ursula's College | Oxley | Brisbane | Catholic (girls) | High | 1925 | 1957 | | |
| Vision Christian School | Booval | Ipswich | Christian | Primary | 1982 | 1992 | | |

== See also ==
- List of schools in Queensland
- List of schools in Gold Coast, Queensland
- List of schools in Sunshine Coast, Queensland
- List of schools in West Moreton
