= Feao Fotuaika =

Australian rugby union player

- Born: 23 April 1993 (age 33) Gisborne, New Zealand
- Height: 1.86 m (6 ft 1 in)
- Weight: 135 kg (298 lb; 21 st 4 lb)
- School: St. Francis College

Rugby union career
- Position: Prop
- Current team: Lyon
Senior career
Years	Team	Apps	(Points)
2014	Queensland Country	3	(0)
2015–2019	Brisbane City	28	(0)
2019–2022	Reds	31	(10)
2022–2025	Lyon	15	(5)
2025	Brumbies	11	(5)
2026-	Force	0	(0)
- Correct as of 4 May 2026
International career
Years	Team	Apps	(Points)
2022–	Tonga	7	(0)
- Correct as of 30 August 2025

Feao Fotuaika (born 23 April 1993) is a professional rugby union player who plays as a prop for Super Rugby club Western Force. Born in New Zealand, he represents Tonga at international level after qualifying on ancestry grounds.
