= Brisbane Christian College =

Private School in Brisbane, Australia

Location
- Location of the Middle and Secondary school camps at 63 Fairlie Terrace, Salisbury, Brisbane, Queensland; Australia; 27°33′00″S 153°01′20″E

Information
- Former name: Regan Collie Christian College
- School type: Independent co-educational early learning, primary and secondary day school
- Motto: Wisdom and Knowledge through Christ
- Religious affiliations: Assemblies of God; Life Church Brisbane
- Denomination: Presbyterian
- Established: 1985; 41 years ago
- Principal: Sean Morrison
- Employees: c. 175
- Years: Early learning; K–12
- Enrolment: c. 1090 (2024)
- Campus type: Suburban
- Colours: Navy Blue, Teal, Green
- Website: brisbanechristiancollege.com.au
- Institution Details – Australian Government

Brisbane Christian College (formerly Southside Christian College) is an independent, non-denominational Christian co-educational school located in the Brisbane suburb of Salisbury, Queensland, Australia. Established in 1985, the College offers education from Pre-Prep to Year 12 and operates as a ministry of Life Church Brisbane. It is a member of Independent Schools Queensland.

According to the Australian Curriculum, Assessment and Reporting Authority, Brisbane Christian College has an enrolment of 1,090 students and employes 71 teaching staff and 104 non-teaching staff as of 2024. The College is spread across three campuses: a Pre-Prep Centre, a Primary School (Prep to Year 5), and a Middle and Secondary School (Years 6 to 12).

== Campuses ==
Brisbane Christian College operates across three campuses; all located in the southern suburbs of Brisbane.

The Pre-Prep Centre, catering to Pre-Prep and Kindergarden students, is situated at 28 Rookwood Avenue, Coopers Plains. The site was formerly occupied by the Coopers Plains State Preschool Centre.

The 2.227-hectare (5.50-acre) Primary Campus, accommodating students from Prep to Year 5, is located at 109 Golda Avenue, Salisbury. The site was previously occupied by the Brisbane office of Rudnev Australia.

The 10.016-hectare (24.75-acre) Middle and Secondary Campus, serving students from Year 6 to Year 12, is located at 63 Fairlie Terrace, Salisbury. The campus was formerly the site of Nyanda State High School (formerly known as Salisbury State High School).

== History ==
The College was established on Sunday, 14 April 1985 and opened on 15 April 1985, under the name Southside Christian College. The school originally only had one campus, the Primary Campus, with the Pre-Prep Centre opening in 2010 and the Middle and Secondary Campus opening in 2016. The College name was changed in August 2010 to Brisbane Christian College.

The Primary Campus was the original campus and opened on 15 April 1985 with between 12 and 16 primary school students and 12 staff members on a former industrial site. By 1986, the school had requested the maximum enrolment number to increase to 200 for 1988, however, only a maximum of 100 was granted. In 1987, the school again requested Government funding to increase its enrolments but was denied. However, the school did receive $65,970 in recurrent grants that year.

The land for the Pre-Prep Centre was bought in 2007 and was originally intended to open and begin operations in 2008. However, by February 2009, the College had only just received approval to construct the Centre, with a proposed completion date set for September 2009. Construction began in June 2009.

The Pre-Prep Centre was meant to open on Monday, 29 February 2010, however, opened on Monday, 15 March 2010. The centre cost over $1 million. Previously, the program consisted of two classes operating only five days each fortnight. However, after the opening of the Centre, the College operated both a five-day week and five-day fortnight program.

On 26 November 2013, Education Minister Langbroek met with the College principal at the time, Sean Morrison, to discuss using the former site of Nyanda State High School for the College's Middle and Secondary Campus. It opened in 2016.

=== Controversy ===
The closure of Nyanda State High School was met with protests by the community including the Prime Minister at the time, Kevin Rudd. The Queensland Teachers' Union thought it was illogical for the Government to sell the school to Brisbane Christian College because "Selling the site to Brisbane Christian College acknowledges that there was community need for a secondary school in the area." In a Freedom of Information Request under the Right to Information Act 2009, the Nyanda State High School valuation was not disclosed, instead stating "Disclosure would, on balance, be contrary to the public interest". In November 2015, a Freedom of Information Request was put forward requesting "Documents held by the former Ministers Office in relation to Brisbane Christian College." However, the application was withdrawn, so no documents were released.

== Governance ==
Brisbane Christian College is a ministry of Life Church Brisbane, a church affiliated with the Australian Christian Churches movement. The College is a member school with Independent Schools Queensland, a peak representative body for independent schools in the state and is registered as a non-government school union with the Australian Government.

Governance of the school is overseen by the Board of Directors, which is appointed by the leadership of Life Church Brisbane. The Board is responsible for strategic matters such as enrolment trends and policy. It meets monthly to review College operations in alignment with its strategic plans. Day-to-day management is delegated to the principal, who operates within the guidelines set by the Board. The current principal is Sean Morrison, who was appointed in 2010.

The Board appoints a Finance Committee that also meets monthly to receive financial reports from the College Business Manager. This committee monitors financial performance and gives the Board recommendations on matters such as the annual budget and school fees. The financial accounts of Brisbane Christian College and its associated property entity, Southside Christian Centre Property Ltd, are audited annually. The current Chairperson of the Board is Pastor John Hunt, who was appointed in 2023. The Chair of the College Board is an independent individual with no affiliation to either Life Church or Brisbane Christian College.

=== Former principals ===
| Ordinal | Officeholder | Term start | Term end | Time in office | Notes |
|---|---|---|---|---|---|
| n/a | Pastor Clyde Marbach | 1985 | 1986 | 0 years | Actor |
| 1 | Phillip Moore | 1986 | 1990 | 3–4 years | |
| 2 | Peter Bancroft | 1990 | 1997 | 6–7 years | |
| 3 | Graeme Johnston | 4 October 1999 | 27 August 2010 | 10–11 years | |
| n/a | H.O. Bensley | 2010 | 2011 | 0 years | Actor |
| 4 | Sean Morrison | January 2011 | incumbent | 15 years | |

=== Finances ===
The majority of the College's finances stem from recurrent Government grants; it was announced on 9 October 1985 that recurrent grants was approved and was to begin the following year for the College. On 7 November, it was disclosed that only the primary levels were approved for the recurrent funding but not the junior secondary. It is unclear when recurrent funding was approved for the higher grades; however, the school received $2.23 million under the States Grants (Primary and Secondary Education Assistance) Bill 2000 and in 2006 the Government provided over $360,000 into infrastructure for the secondary department. The College registered with the Australian Charities and Not-for-profits Commission on 2 December 2012.

==== 2022 ====
According to the 2022 Annual Information Statement submitted to the Australian Charities and Non-for-profits Commission, the school's total revenue for the 2022 reporting period was $20,409,745. (Note: The reporting period is between 1 January to 31 December, not the Australian financial year (1 July to 30 June)) Despite advertising itself as an independent school, the majority of this income, $13,116,984, was received through Government grants from both the Federal and State Governments. $7,285,987 was received through providing goods and/or services, 'other revenue' made up $0, and donations and bequests made up the final $6,774. Other income (for example, gains) added $414,118 to the total, making the total gross income for the College in the 2022 reporting period was $20,823,863.

Expenses for the 2022 reporting period included Employee expenses, Interest expenses, and 'All other expenses' with the total expenses being $18,833,511. The majority of expenses, $13,004,473, went to Employee expenses. $5,566,090 went toward 'All other expenses' and the remaining $262,948 went toward Interest expenses. This makes $1,990,352 being the Total comprehensive income of Brisbane Christian College for the 2022 reporting period.

==== 2023 ====
According to the 2023 Annual Information Statement submitted to the Australian Charities and Not-for-profits Commission, the school's total revenue for the 2023 reporting period was $22,452,047. The majority of this income, $14,109,885, was received through Government grants from both the Federal and State Governments. $8,149,420 was received through providing goods and/or services, 'other revenue' made up $186,095 and donations and bequests made up the final $6,647. Other income (for example, gains) added $341,658 to the total, making the total gross income for the College in the 2023 reporting period was $22,793,705.

Expenses for the 2023 reporting period included Employee expenses, Interest expenses, and 'All other expenses' with the total expenses being $20,666,997. The majority of expenses, $14,530,116, went to Employee expenses. $5,911,516 went toward 'All other expenses' and the remaining $225,365 went toward Interest expenses. This makes $2,126,708 being the Total comprehensive income of Brisbane Christian College for the 2023 reporting period.

==== 2024 ====
According to the 2024 Annual Information Statement submitted to the Australian Charities and Not-for-profits Commission, the school's total revenue for the 2024 reporting period was $24,783,018. The majority of this income, 62.25% ($15,426,507), was received through Government grants from both the Federal and State Governments. 36.22% ($8,975,762) was received through providing goods and/or services, 'other revenue' made up 1.51% ($373,164) and donations and bequests made up the final 0.03% ($7,585). 'Other income (for example, gains)' added $273,744 to the total, making the total gross income for the College in the 2024 reporting period was $25,056,762.

Expenses for the 2024 reporting period included Employee expenses, Interest expenses, and 'All other expenses' with the total expenses being $22,499,841. The majority of expenses, 69.77% ($15,697,578) went to Employee expenses. 29.38% ($6,611,289) went toward 'All other expenses' and the remaining 0.85% ($190,974) went toward Interest expenses. This makes $2,556,921 being the Total comprehensive income of Brisbane Christian College for the 2024 reporting period.

== Student life ==
=== Chaplaincy and student wellbeing ===
Brisbane Christian College has 6 school chaplains, two for the Middle and Secondary Campus, two for the Primary campus and one on both campuses. They also have a college pastor and an assistant college pastor. School chapel services happen every week and are led by the chaplains and involve a message, prayer, and worship. The school also has two school counsellors, one on the Primary campus and one on the Middle and Secondary campus. Students can be referred to a counsellor by a parent or teacher, or self-refer if the student is older.

=== House system ===
The College previously had 3 houses named Moody, Slessor and Taylor; however, currently the College has 6 houses, named after notable individuals in the Christian faith. On the Middle and Secondary Campus each house has a staff member who is assigned as the Head of House, who are responsible for the Pastoral Care of the students assigned to the house, while classroom teachers are responsible for the student Pastoral Care on the Primary Campus. In the morning, the school also offers family groups for those on the Middle and Secondary Campus, which are mixed-age groups with students from all Middle and Secondary year levels in their House.

| House | Colour | Head of House | Eponym |
|---|---|---|---|
| Bernall | Blue | Mr Tom Schad | Cassie René Bernall, a student killed in the Columbine High School massacre, whom was falsely reported to have been asked moments before her death if she believed in God, to which she responded, "Yes." |
| Carey | Sky Blue | Mrs Christine Thomas | William Carey, an English missionary who is known as the 'Father of modern Missions'. (Note: "Brisbane Christian College's post". Facebook. 22 December 2018. "Carey House is named after William Carey, an individual who became known as the 'Father of modern Missions'") |
| Livingstone | Yellow | Mr James Earle | David Livingstone, a Scottish missionary who wrote on the horrors of the slave trade in Africa. |
| Newton | Orange | Mr Richard Proctor | John Newton, an English sailor who wrote many hymns, the most notable being Amazing Grace. |
| Pascal | Green | Mr David Caswell | Blaise Pascal, a mathematician who was known for Pascal's Wager. |
| Wesley | Red | Mr Gordon Hooker | John Wesley |

=== International students ===
The College offers an international program for students from Preparatory to Year 12. It is registered with the Commonwealth Register of Institutions and Courses for Overseas Students (CRICOS). Previously, the College operated as an exempt provider under the Education Services for Overseas Students (Registration of Providers and Financial Regulation) Regulations Act and its 1992 amendment.

The College hosts a diverse population of international students, with a significant number originating from South Korea and Taiwan. It has also welcomed students from Mainland China, Singapore, Hong Kong, Thailand, Malaysia, and various Pacific island nations, including the Solomon Islands, Fiji, and Papua New Guinea.

Students in the international program are given support lessons to improve their English and must complete an English proficiency test before applying. The school used to have a homestay program; however, the school will be cancelling homestay at the end of 2025 and is not accepting new admissions for homestay.

== Demographics ==
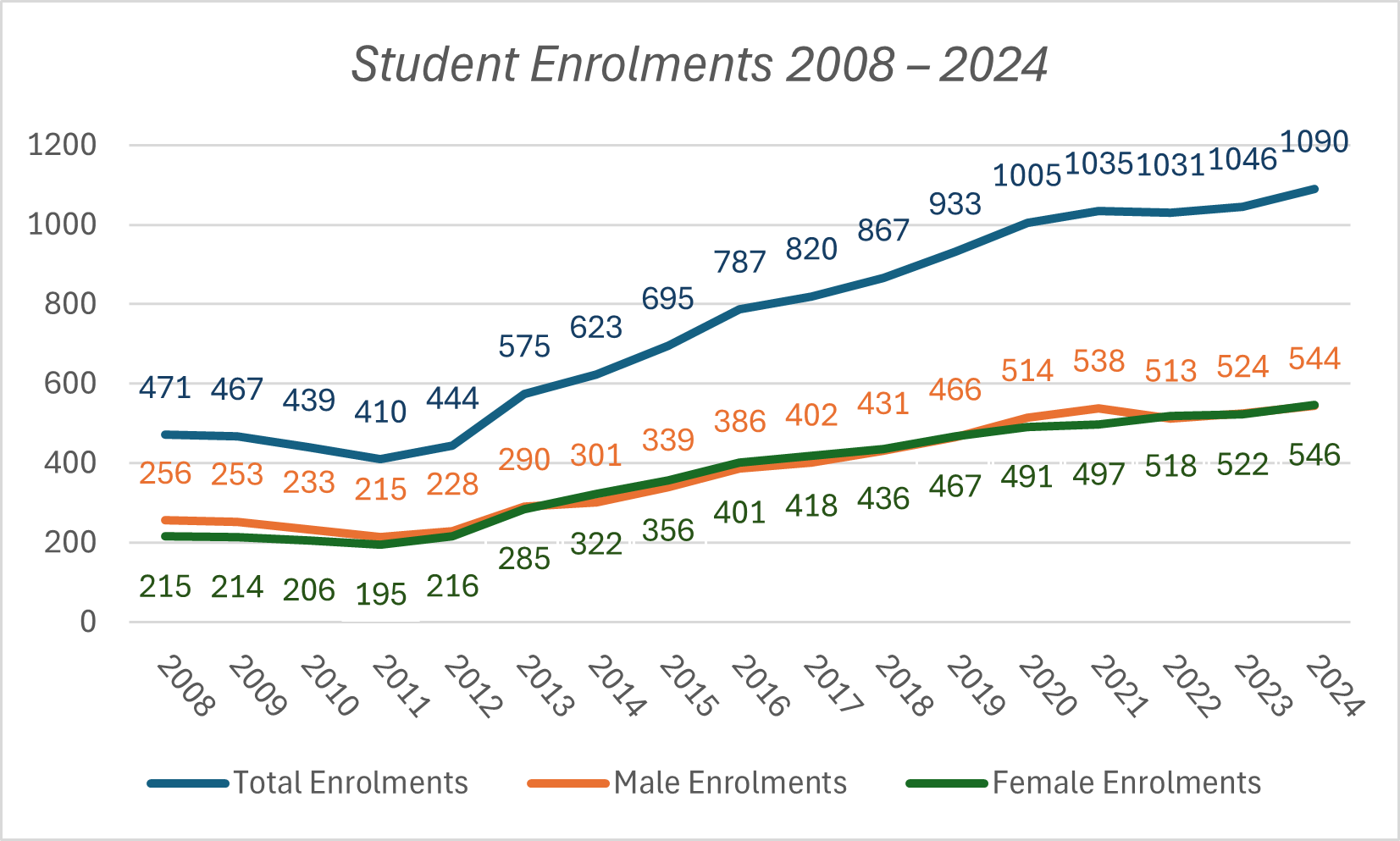
Brisbane Christian College Student Enrolment Data 2008 to 2024.

In 2022, the school had a student enrolment of 1,031 with 63 teachers (58.3 full-time equivalent) and 107 non-teaching staff (59.3 full-time equivalent). Female enrolments consisted of 518 students and Male enrolments consisted of 513 students; Indigenous enrolments accounted for a total of 2% and 38% of students had a language background other than English.

In 2023, the school had a student enrolment of 1,046 with 64 teachers (60.6 full-time equivalent) and 107 non-teaching staff (60.1 full-time equivalent). Female enrolments consisted of 522 students and Male enrolments consisted of 524 students; Indigenous enrolments accounted for a total of 2% and 43% of students had a language background other than English.

In 2024, the school had a student enrolment of 1,090 with 71 teachers (66.1 full-time equivalent) and 104 non-teaching staff (58.5 full-time equivalent). Female enrolments consisted of 545 students and Male enrolments consisted of 545 students; Indigenous enrolments accounted for a total of 2% and 47% of students had a language background other than English.

== Curriculum ==
=== Prep ===
In Prep, students learn maths, literacy, integrative studies, Chinese, and sport. Integrative studies include humanities, science, English, technology and the arts. In first semester sport, students participate in gymnastics every week and do swimming lessons in term 4.

=== Primary (Grades 1-5) ===
In Primary School, students learn maths, Christian studies, integrated studies, physical education and English. Integrative studies in primary school include humanities, science, technologies and the arts. English in years 1-2 provides foundational literacy skills, while English in years 3-5 is focused on consolidating skills, with novel reading starting in year 3.

=== Middle (Grades 6-8) ===
In Middle School, students learn the core subjects of English, math, history, science and geography. They also rotate through all elective subjects.

Electives include:

- Chinese
- Christian Studies
- Digital Technologies
- Design and Technologies
- Drama
- Health and Physical Education
- Music
- STEM
- Visual Arts

=== Secondary (Grades 9-12) ===
In Secondary School students may choose from subjects to complete. Maths and English are compulsory for all grades, and in years 9 and 10, Christian Studies and Science are also required. Only year 9 students are required to complete History and Physical Education. Chinese is optionally offered as a language. For year 9, students must select 6 electives (three in semester 1, three in semester 2). Year 10's must select three electives to study for the whole year. In year 11 and 12, students do six subjects total and may do a vocational education and training course instead of a subject. In years 10-12, students may choose levels of math. Additionally, the school also offers an aviation program, allowing students to graduate with a commercial pilot's licence

=== Year 12 Results ===
According to the Queensland Curriculum and Assessment Authority:

Year 12 Results for Brisbane Christian College 2016-2019
| Year | Total (Note: Total number of students in the Year 12 cohort for the corresponding year.) | SEP (Note: The number of students who received a Senior Education Profile (may incl. QCE, TE, QCIA)) | QCE (Note: The number of students who received a Queensland Certificate of Education (QCE)) | QCIA (Note: The number of students awarded a Queensland Certificate of Individual Achievement (QCIA)) | VET (Note: The number of students awarded one or more vocational education and training (VET) qualifications) | SAT (Note: The number of students who are completing or have completed a school-based apprenticeship or traineeship) | OP (Note: The number of students who received an Overall Position (OP)) | IBD (Note: The number of students awarded an International Baccalaureate Diploma) | S.S ONLY (Note: The number of students who completed Year 12 and received a statement of results (Senior Statement) but did not qualify for QCE or any other award.) | % with (Note: The percentage of Year 12 students who were awarded at least one of the following: QCE, VET (including students who participated in a SAT), IBD) | % QTAC (Note: The percentage of students who applied for and received an offer of a tertiary place through the Queensland Tertiary Admissions Centre (QTAC)) |
|---|---|---|---|---|---|---|---|---|---|---|---|
| 2016 | 32 | 32 | 29 | 0 | 17 | 7 | 17 | 0 | 0 | 100% | 100% |
| 2017 | 50 | 49 | 49 | 0 | 22 | 9 | 31 | 0 | 0 | 100% | 80% |
| 2018 | 51 | 48 | 46 | 0 | 22 | 4 | 28 | 0 | 0 | 98% | 100% |
| 2019 | 58 | 56 | 53 | 0 | 26 | 8 | 37 | 0 | 0 | 100% | 99% |

Year 12 Results for Brisbane Christian College 2020-Present
| Year | Total | SEP | QCE | QCIA | VET | SAT | IBD | UNI (Note: University studies – The number of students who completed a university subject while at school.) | QCE AA (Note: QCE Achievement Awards – The Queensland Certificate of Education (QCE) Achievement Awards celebrate the academic learning achievements of Queensland’s highest performing students.) |
|---|---|---|---|---|---|---|---|---|---|
| 2020 | 53 | 53 | 42 | 0 | 22 | 3 | 0 | 2 | 0 |
| 2021 | 55 | 55 | 48 | 0 | 29 | 4 | 0 | 2 | 0 |
| 2022 | 68 | 67 | 55 | 0 | 28 | 10 | 0 | 3 | 2 |
| 2023 | 58 | 58 | 54 | 0 | 28 | 1 | 0 | 1 | 2 |
| 2024 | 73 | 72 | 68 | 0 | 48 | 8 | 0 | 4 | 7 |
| 2025 | TBA | TBA | TBA | TBA | TBA | TBA | TBA | TBA | TBA |

== Extra-curricular activities ==
Brisbane Christian College has many extra-curricular programs such as debating, Chinese culture club and art club. The school's primary campus is also a venue for the Queensland Debating Union's primary school competition.

Brisbane Christian College also offers training in basketball, football, futsal, netball, touch football and volleyball. The school is involved in the Independent Schools Championship, which is a competition between four schools(the other three schools being Citipointe Christian College, Redlands College and Moreton Bay Boys College) for years 9-12.

The school also offers a music program. Music lessons can be completed in either paired lessons or individual lessons, which are both around 30 minutes per session. They also host ensemble programs, such as worship teams and strings ensembles. The school also offers a musical every year.

=== Life Festival ===
The Brisbane Life Festival is an annual event hosted by the school. It involves festivities such as rides and food. Additionally there are also performances by the choir and College band, and people also hold stalls at the festival.

== Alumni ==
Alumni lists are available on the Names Database and the school has a section of past students' accomplishments on its website. Alumni of the College include the Australian singer Dami Im.

== See also ==
- Education in Queensland
- List of schools in Greater Brisbane
