= Yarranlea Primary School =

- Crest of Yarranlea Primary School

Location
- Mount Gravatt, Queensland; Australia; 27°32′36″S 153°3′56″E

Information
- Type: Independent school, co-educational, primary, day school
- Motto: Believe Achieve
- Established: 1883-1900 (Hermitage Provisional School); 1901–1977 (Yarranlea State School); 1979–1986 (Museum display school); 1987–2013 (Old Yarranlea State School); 2014–Present (Yarranlea Primary School)
- Principal: David Costin
- Campus: Urban (Mount Gravatt)
- Website: www.yarranlea.qld.edu.au

Yarranlea Primary School is an independent co-educational primary school located in the Mount Gravatt campus of Griffith University in Mount Gravatt, Queensland, Australia.

== History ==
The school opened on 22 January 1883 in Yarranlea, Queensland (27.7533°S 151.5408°E) as Hermitage Provisional School. The school building which is still in use at the school's current Mount Gravatt, Queensland location was constructed on the Yarranlea site in 1888. This school building is heritage listed by Brisbane City Council.

In 1901, the school was changed to a State School and thus was renamed Yarranlea State School. Due to falling attendance, Yarranlea State School closed was in 1977.

In 1979, the school building was relocated to from its Yarranlea location to the Mount Gravatt College of Advanced Education (now Griffith University Mount Gravatt campus) which is located in Mount Gravatt, Queensland, Australia. The school building was used as a museum display school.

In 1987, the school building was again relocated a short distance within the Griffith University Mount Gravatt campus. On 27 January 1987, the school reopened as Old Yarranlea State School. It provided the opportunity for trainee teachers to experience a one-teacher school environment.

In December 2013, the school was once again closed by Education Queensland as part of a broader schools cost-cutting program by the Newman government. The school's website was partially archived.

The school was reopened as an independent school in July 2014 as Yarranlea Primary School.
