= Queensland School for Travelling Show Children =

Coordinates: 27°33′24.90″S 153°04′47.34″E

The Queensland School for Travelling Show Children (QSTSC) was a publicly funded co-educational primary (K–7) school that provided distance education services to the children and families of itinerant business proprietors and workers on the agricultural show circuits in all states and territories of Australia except Western Australia.

Families whose incomes were dependent on the employment opportunities provided by the shows had traditionally found it difficult to access mainstream educational services leading in some cases to interruption or abandonment of education at an early age and in others either the splitting up of families as one parent or carer stayed on the circuit whilst another settled in one place on a permanent basis or cessation of the occupation by parents and carers.

A sub-section of the Brisbane School of Distance Education (BSDE), the actual school consisted of two mobile classrooms which were transported separately each week to a new location (usually the grounds of a primary school). The site of the temporary locations was dictated by the routes followed by the show circuits. The school maintained an administrative office on the BDSE campus in the Brisbane suburb of Coorparoo.

== Genesis ==
In Australia distance education is both well established and well regarded. Standard distance education programs had been regularly utilised by show people up to degree level but it was felt that it was necessary to provide an educational methodology that both followed a mainstream formal curriculum and allowed the students to maintain a distinctive cultural identity. After sustained lobbying by representatives of the Australian Romani community and the Showman's Guild of Australia, the Queensland government agreed to establish a specially developed distance learning curriculum for the children in 1989. Following the success of this program it was decided in 1999 to set up a mobile school with transportable classrooms which could accompany the show people on their circuits and provide a more structured learning environment. The school first opened its doors to pupils for an initial trial period in January 2000.

== Operation ==
The school operated three "runs". Two of which, the "Northern" and the "Lower", conducted classes in specially adapted semi-trailers which were hauled from location to location by a prime mover driven by a staff member. Each Prep (i.e. "K") to Year 7 semi trailer travelling classroom was staffed by two teachers and supported by one operations officer. A third run operated as and when required at locations where there were sufficient students whose families were working off the main show circuits who could attend classes. This run typically conducted classes in rooms at a local host school. For example, in one week in October 2011, one trailer was located in the Mount Gambier Showgrounds in South Australia, the other was at a school in Bendigo, Victoria whilst the "third run" conducted classes in a classroom provided by a school in Hobart, Tasmania.

Whilst at a location the operation of the QSTSC was autonomous from a host school though it may have been physically located within the school grounds and the pupils may have been invited to participate in activities with those of the host school.

In 2010 the school had a total enrolment of 40 of whom 15% were self identified as indigenous. There were 7 teaching staff and 3 non-teaching staff. The attendance rate was 95%. In 2011 enrolments had risen to 54 of whom 7% were indigenous. The number of teachers on staff was 6 supported by 4 non-teaching staff.

QSTSC attempted, so far as was practicable, to provide students with an emulation of school life as experienced by students who attended a "normal" school. Thus students followed a curriculum which conforms to the standards laid down by Education Queensland and participated in activities such as "Learn to Swim" schemes and NAPLAN testing, as well as being expected to conform to the usual uniform, attendance, punctuality and behavioral standards.

== Parents and Citizens Association ==
As with most state schools in Australia, QSTSC was supported by an active P&C which raised funds to buy additional equipment and facilities for the use of the school community. Typically the actual meetings were to be held in the locations being used by one of the runs and parents on the other run or at remote locations participated through a teleconferencing facility provided by the school.

== Closure ==
The school closed in at the end of the 2012 school year, despite reported offers of funding from the Australian Federal Government and Government of New South Wales. The education minister cited poor attendance, poor results in standardized testing and the fact that most students were from outside Queensland as primary reasons for closing the school.

== See also ==
- List of schools in Queensland

== Other sources ==
- Danaher, Geoff and Moriarty, Beverley and Danaher, Patrick Alan (2006) Challenging heterotopic space: a study of the Queensland school for travelling show children. Studies in Learning, Evaluation, Innovation and Development, 3 (1). pp. 40–51. ISSN 1832-2050
- Olding, Rachel (2010) Show and tell: travelling school in a class of its own, The Sydney Morning Herald, 14 April
- Negus, George (2004) George Negus Tonight: Travelling School, ABC, Broadcast 6.30pm on 02/08/2004 Accessed October 2010
- Fullerton, Catherine and Moriarty, Beverley and Danaher, Patrick Alan and Danaher, Geoff (2005) The Principal as change leader and manager in and via the Queensland School for Travelling Show Children. Prime Focus: the professional journal for Australian primary school leaders (40). pp. 15–17. ISSN 1322-249X
