= Mt Maria College =

Coordinates: 27°24′41.33″S 152°58′47.6″E

Mt Maria College, Mitchelton
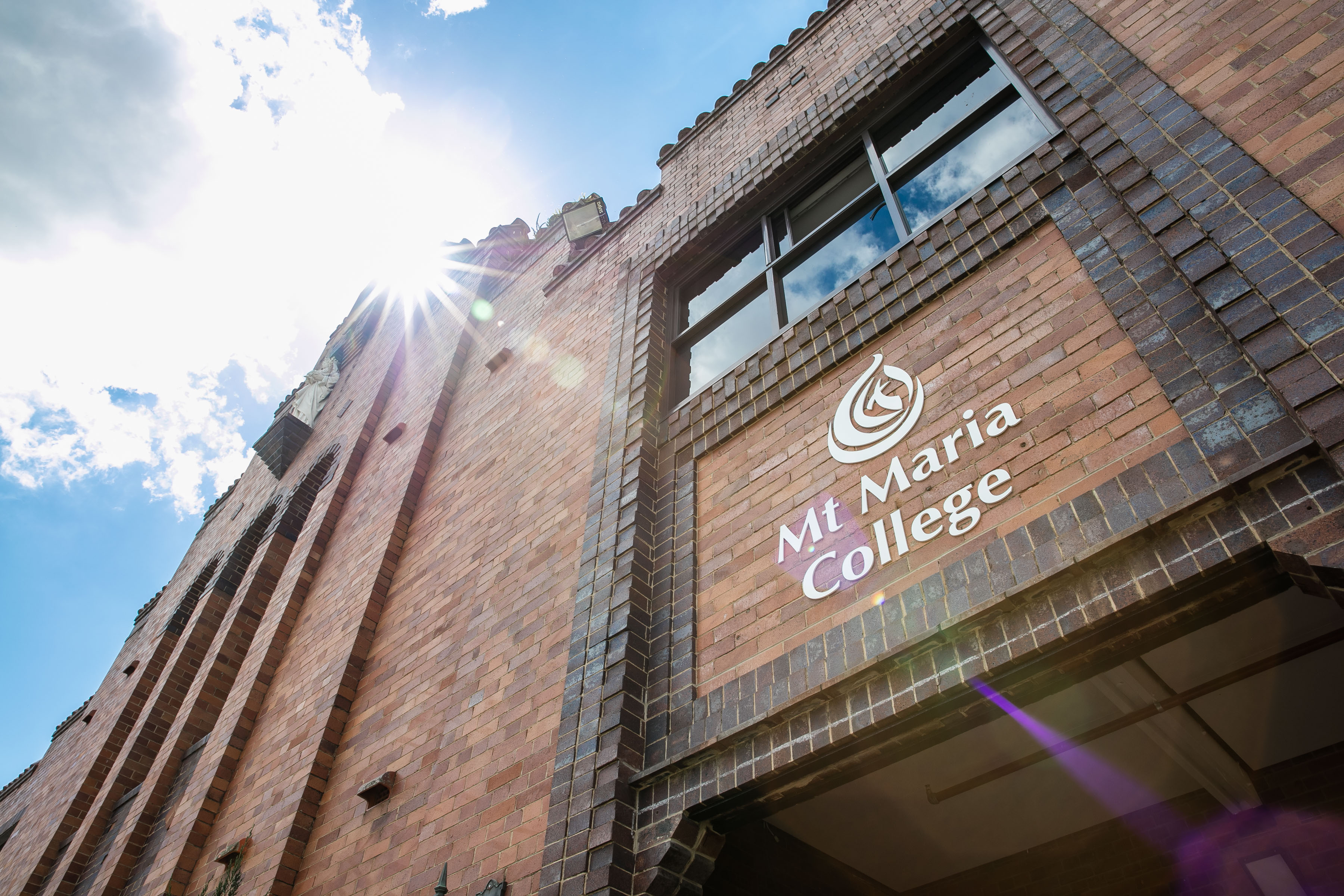
- The Rose Pelletier building at Mt Maria College, Mitchelton
- 54 Prospect Road, Mitchelton, Queensland; Australia

Information
- Type: Independent co-educational secondary day school
- Motto: Strong Mind – Compassionate Heart
- Religious affiliation: Association of Marist Schools of Australia
- Denomination: Roman Catholic
- Established: 1978; 48 years ago
- Years: 7–12
- Campus: Suburban
- Affiliations: Brisbane Catholic Education
- Website: www.mtmaria.qld.edu.au

Mt Maria College is an independent Roman Catholic co-educational secondary day school located in the Brisbane suburb of Mitchelton, Queensland, Australia. The College is part of Brisbane Catholic Education.

== History ==
Mt Maria Junior Secondary College and Mt Maria Senior College existed for many years as two separate schools. In 2006 the two colleges combined to form Mt Maria College.

The property now occupied by the Mt Maria College Mitchelton campus was originally set up in 1930 by the Sisters of the Good Shepherd as the Good Shepherd Home, catering for those with intellectual disabilities, orphans or those deemed to be ‘uncontrollable’ in their own homes. The home was closed in late 1974 due to changes in community and government expectations, as well as financial difficulties.

In 1970, the site that was occupied by the Mt Maria College Enoggera campus was established by the Marist Brothers as a boys school, initially for years 5–7. The school was known as Marcellin College (and as Marist Brothers Enoggera). The first year 12 class graduated in 1976.

In 1978 Brisbane Catholic Education purchased the Mt Maria Senior College Mitchelton campus, with the intention of providing co-educational schooling for senior students (years 11 and 12) from Marcellin College and from St Benedict's Catholic Girls School at Wilston. Marcellin and St Benedict's closed their year 11 and 12 classes in 1977 and in 1978 Mt Maria Senior Secondary College began operating at Mitchelton, under Brother Terrence Heinrich, who had previously been principal at Marcellin. He was succeeded by Brother Robert O'Connor in 1981, who in turn was succeeded by Brother Anthony in 1985.

By the late 1980s, Catholic primary schools were teaching boys through to grade 7, and consequently Marcellin no longer needed to provide primary school education. When St Benedicts closed its doors in 1991 the girls school moved over to the Marcellin campus at Enoggera and became Mt Maria Junior Secondary College.

The two schools operated like this until the amalgamation in January 2006, when the two colleges were jointly renamed Mt Maria College, a new uniform phased in and the adoption of a new logo took place.

In 2021, physical education teacher Lucas John Gill was caught and charged for possession of child exploitation material, which included 100,000 explicit images and 20 hours of explicit video footage of minors. Additionally, he was found to have groomed a 13 year old girl. He pleaded guilty to possession of child exploitation material, grooming a child under 16, and distribution of child exploitation material. He was sentenced to four and a half years imprisonment.

== Notable alumni ==
- Brett Peter Cowan, murderer and child rapist

== Heritage listing ==
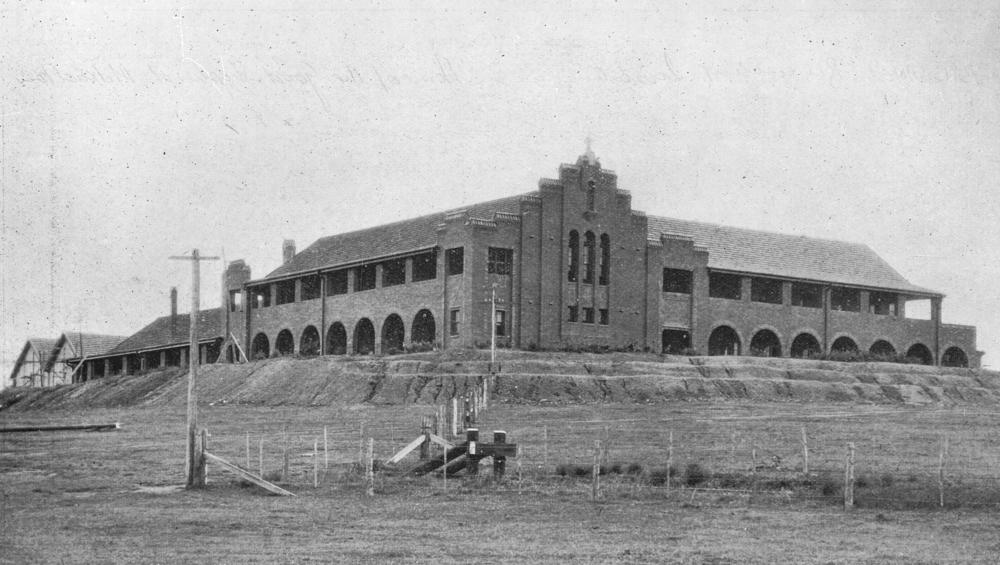
Home of the Good Shepherd (now Rose Pelletier Building), Mitchelton, Brisbane, 1931

The former convent, the Home of the Good Shepherd (now the Rose Pelletier Building), is listed on the Brisbane Heritage Register.
