= St Francis College, Crestmead =

Location
- Crestmead, Queensland; Australia; 27.6920°S 153.0827°E

Information
- Type: Private, co-educational, secondary, day school
- Motto: In Simplicity and Harmony
- Established: 1988
- Principal: John Marinucci, (Primary principal, David Macknesh)
- Colours: Blue and white
- Affiliation: Roman Catholic
- Website: www.sfcc.qld.edu.au

St Francis College (SFCC) is a private, co-educational, Catholic school, located in Crestmead in City of Logan, Queensland, Australia. It is administered by the Queensland Catholic Education Commission, with an enrolment of 873 students and a teaching staff of 76, as of 2023. The school serves students from Prep to Year 12. The College Patron is St Francis of Assisi.

== History ==
The school opened on 28 February 1988.

== Sport ==
The school currently participates in inter-school sporting competitions in futsal, rugby league, and netball.

== Family Groups ==
St Francis College has four Family Groups: Jagun, Kurrawa, Wimulli and Yaraay.

The Family Group names were borrowed, with permission, from the languages of the traditional owners of the land covering South East Queensland, the Yugambeh and Yuggera people.

House	Jagun	Kurrawa	Wimulli	Yaraay
Colour	Green	Blue	Red	Yellow
Meaning	Earth	Water	Fire	Sun
Symbol	Bible	Water Jug	Candle	Franciscan Tau

== Notable alumni ==
- Nick Cummins – former Australian Rugby Union international and Bachelor Contestant
