= Electoral results for the district of Stretton =

Queensland, Australia, district election results

This is a list of electoral results for the district of Stretton in Queensland state elections.

== Members for Stretton ==
Member	Party	Term
Stephen Robertson	Labor	2001–2012
Freya Ostapovitch	Liberal National	2012–2015
Duncan Pegg	Labor	2015–2021

== Election results ==
=== Elections in the 2020s ===
2024 Queensland state election: Stretton
Party	Candidate	Votes	%	±%
Labor	James Martin	13,347	45.58	−11.02
Liberal National	Freya Ostapovitch	9,952	33.99	+3.79
Greens	Ahmed Abdulhamed	4,154	14.19	+5.49
One Nation	Stephen Strong	1,094	3.73	−0.77
Family First	Merle Totenhofer	735	2.51	+2.51
Total formal votes		29,282	95.37	
Informal votes		1,421	4.63	
Turnout		30,703	88.75	
Two-party-preferred result
Labor	James Martin	17,434	59.54	−5.26
Liberal National	Freya Ostapovitch	11,848	40.46	+5.26
Labor hold		Swing	-5.26	

2021 Stretton state by-election
Party	Candidate	Votes	%	±%
Labor	James Martin	14,314	56.39	−0.20
Liberal National	Jim Bellos	8,322	32.78	+2.58
Greens	Andrea Wildin	1,654	6.52	−2.20
Informed Medical Options	Jasmine Melhop	616	2.43	+2.43
Animal Justice	Suzanne Clarke	478	1.88	+1.88
Total formal votes		25,384	96.61	+0.03
Informal votes		891	3.39	−0.03
Turnout		26,275	77.37	−10.43
Two-party-preferred result
Labor	James Martin	16,244	63.94	−0.87
Liberal National	Jim Bellos	9,160	36.06	+0.87
Labor hold		Swing	−0.87	

2020 Queensland state election: Stretton
Party	Candidate	Votes	%	±%
Labor	Duncan Pegg	16,128	56.59	+5.98
Liberal National	Peter Zhuang	8,609	30.21	+1.83
Greens	Andrea Wildin	2,483	8.71	+1.30
One Nation	Alexey Chekhunov	1,280	4.49	−7.38
Total formal votes		28,500	96.58	+1.55
Informal votes		1,010	3.42	−1.55
Turnout		29,510	87.80	+0.64
Two-party-preferred result
Labor	Duncan Pegg	18,473	64.82	+4.93
Liberal National	Peter Zhuang	10,027	35.18	−4.93
Labor hold		Swing	+4.93	

=== Elections in the 2010s ===
2017 Queensland state election: Stretton
Party	Candidate	Votes	%	±%
Labor	Duncan Pegg	14,061	50.6	+8.1
Liberal National	Freya Ostapovitch	7,884	28.4	−9.9
One Nation	Shane Holley	3,298	11.9	+11.9
Greens	Anisa Nandaula	2,059	7.4	+1.0
Independent	Shyamal Reddy	484	1.7	+1.7
Total formal votes		27,786	95.0	−2.9
Informal votes		1,454	5.0	+2.9
Turnout		29,240	87.2	−0.7
Two-party-preferred result
Labor	Duncan Pegg	16,640	59.9	+4.6
Liberal National	Freya Ostapovitch	11,146	40.1	−4.6
Labor hold		Swing	+4.6	

2015 Queensland state election: Stretton
Party	Candidate	Votes	%	±%
Labor	Duncan Pegg	11,876	41.39	+12.67
Liberal National	Freya Ostapovitch	10,884	37.93	−8.92
Independent	David Forde	4,431	15.44	−3.51
Greens	Brian Sadler	1,502	5.23	−0.25
Total formal votes		28,693	97.99	+0.42
Informal votes		588	2.01	−0.42
Turnout		29,281	88.56	−1.59
Two-party-preferred result
Labor	Duncan Pegg	14,386	54.98	+14.54
Liberal National	Freya Ostapovitch	11,778	45.02	−14.54
Labor gain from Liberal National		Swing	+14.54	

2012 Queensland state election: Stretton
Party	Candidate	Votes	%	±%
Liberal National	Freya Ostapovitch	13,000	46.85	+9.75
Labor	Duncan Pegg	7,968	28.72	−24.86
Independent	David Forde	5,259	18.95	+18.95
Greens	Brian Sadler	1,521	5.48	−3.84
Total formal votes		27,748	97.57	−0.57
Informal votes		690	2.43	+2.43
Turnout		28,438	90.16	−0.62
Two-party-preferred result
Liberal National	Freya Ostapovitch	14,239	59.55	+19.03
Labor	Duncan Pegg	9,670	40.45	−19.03
Liberal National gain from Labor		Swing	+19.03	

=== Elections in the 2000s ===
2009 Queensland state election: Stretton
Party	Candidate	Votes	%	±%
Labor	Stephen Robertson	14,404	53.6	−5.5
Liberal National	Kerrie Frizzell	9,974	37.1	+5.0
Greens	Jane Cajdler	2,505	9.3	+0.5
Total formal votes		26,883	97.9	
Informal votes		509	2.1	
Turnout		27,392	90.8	
Two-party-preferred result
Labor	Stephen Robertson	15,293	59.5	−5.0
Liberal National	Kerrie Frizzell	10,418	40.5	+5.0
Labor hold		Swing	−5.0	

2006 Queensland state election: Stretton
Party	Candidate	Votes	%	±%
Labor	Stephen Robertson	16,644	58.8	−1.1
Liberal	Scott Furlong	9,154	32.3	+0.1
Greens	Jane Cajdler	2,510	8.9	+0.9
Total formal votes		28,308	98.1	+0.1
Informal votes		550	1.9	−0.1
Turnout		28,858	90.0	−0.7
Two-party-preferred result
Labor	Stephen Robertson	17,434	64.2	−0.8
Liberal	Scott Furlong	9,728	35.8	+0.8
Labor hold		Swing	−0.8	

2004 Queensland state election: Stretton
Party	Candidate	Votes	%	±%
Labor	Stephen Robertson	15,866	59.9	−2.8
Liberal	Paul Wood	8,522	32.2	−5.1
Greens	Stan Cajdler	2,110	8.0	+8.0
Total formal votes		26,498	98.0	+1.7
Informal votes		527	2.0	−1.7
Turnout		27,025	90.7	−1.3
Two-party-preferred result
Labor	Stephen Robertson	16,601	65.0	+2.3
Liberal	Paul Wood	8,925	35.0	−2.3
Labor hold		Swing	+2.3	

2001 Queensland state election: Stretton
Party	Candidate	Votes	%	±%
Labor	Stephen Robertson	14,778	62.7	+15.5
Liberal	David Lin	8,805	37.3	+6.3
Total formal votes		23,583	96.3	
Informal votes		894	3.7	
Turnout		24,477	92.0	
Labor hold		Swing	+4.8	
