= Henry Parkinson =

Henry or Harry Parkinson may refer to:

- Henry Parkinson (footballer, born 1899) (1899–1994), English footballer for Brentford and Oldham Athletic
- Henry Parkinson (footballer, born 1864) (1864–1941), also known as Harry, English footballer for Everton and Accrington
- Henry Parkinson (railway engineer), railway engineer in Australia and New Zealand
- H. B. Parkinson (Henry Broughton Parkinson), British film producer and director
- Harry Parkinson (cricketer), Australian cricketer
- George Henry Radcliffe Parkinson, also known as Harry, British philosopher and historian of philosophy
