= Acacia Ridge =

- Suburb
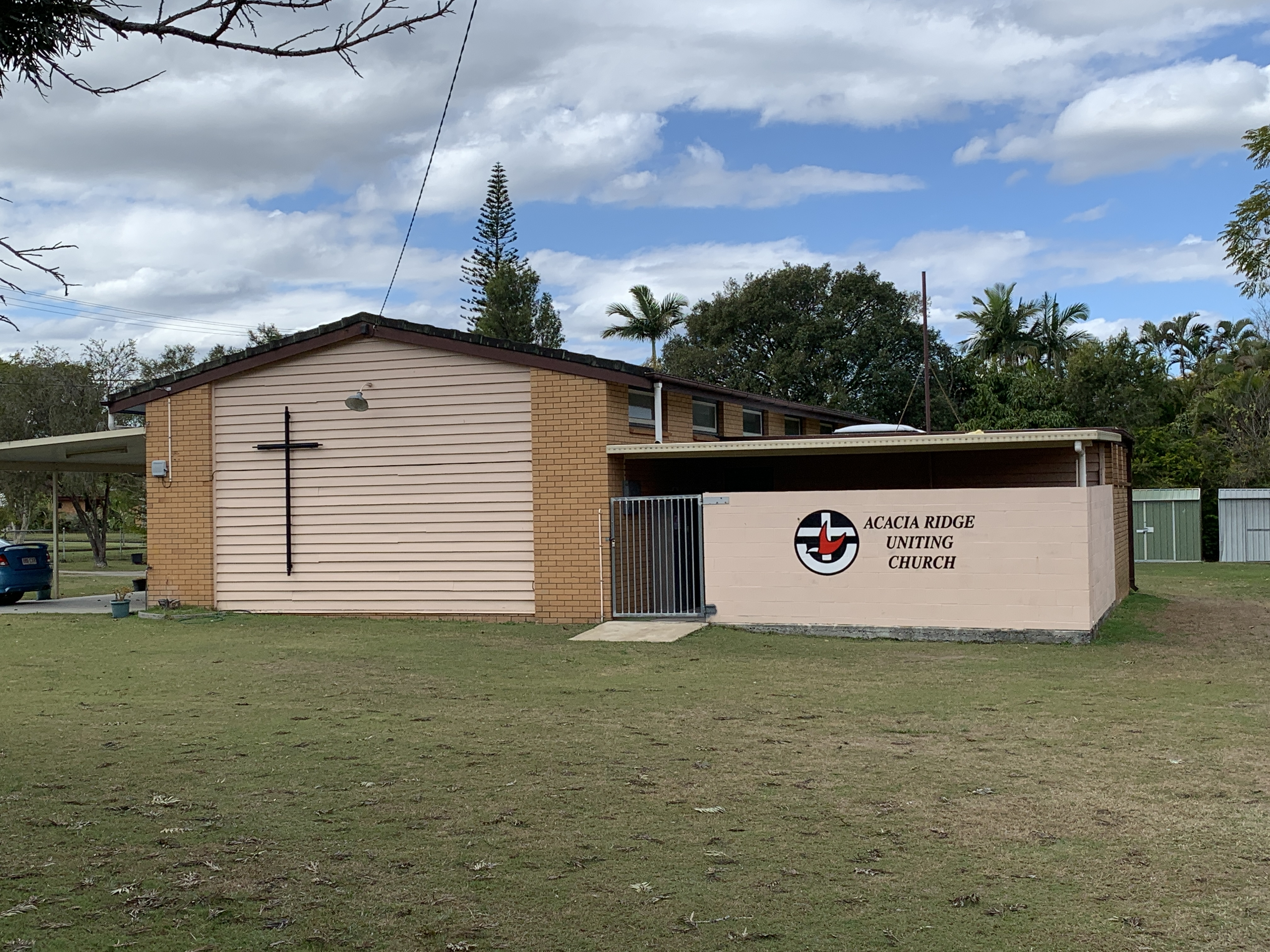
- Acacia Ridge Uniting Church

- Interactive map of Acacia Ridge
- Coordinates: 27.5858°S 153.0261°E
- Country: Australia
- State: Queensland
- City: Brisbane
- LGA: City of Brisbane (Moorooka Ward)
- Location: 15.7 km (9.8 mi) S of Brisbane CBD

Government
  - State electorates: Algester; Stretton
  - Federal division: Moreton

Area
  - Total: 8.6 km^{2} (3.3 sq mi)

Population
  - Total: 7,486 (2021 census)
  - Density: 870/km^{2} (2,254/sq mi)
- Time zone: UTC+10:00 (AEST)
- Postcode: 4110
Suburbs around Acacia Ridge
Archerfield	Coopers Plains	Sunnybank
Willawong	Acacia Ridge	Sunnybank Hills
Willawong	Algester	Sunnybank Hills

Acacia Ridge is a southern suburb in the City of Brisbane, Queensland, Australia. In the 2021 census, Acacia Ridge had a population of 7,486 people.

== Geography ==
Acacia Ridge is 15 kilometres (9 mi) south of the central business district. It is within the local government area of City of Brisbane.

Primarily residential, Acacia Ridge is also known for its heavy industrial area in the suburb's east, occupying much of the suburb's area east of Beaudesert Road.

== History ==
The name Acacia Ridge derives from the number of Acacia species growing in the area.

In October 1884, 275 allotments of "Flemington Estate" were advertised for sale by T. Howling & Co. A map advertising the sale states that the estate was close to the Coopers Plains railway station and that coaches passed the estate every day.

Cooper's Plains Provisional School opened on 1 April 1869, later becoming Cooper's Plains State School. On 10 July 1956, it was renamed Acacia Ridge State School. The school was at 1277 Beaudesert Road (27.5811°S 153.0252°E). After the closure of Acacia Ridge State High School in 1997, Acacia Ridge State School relocated to the high school site in Nyngam Street, while the Murri School took over the Beaudesert Road site.

The suburb was established after World War II to house returning servicemen and their families. Many of the original post-war dwellings still stand today.

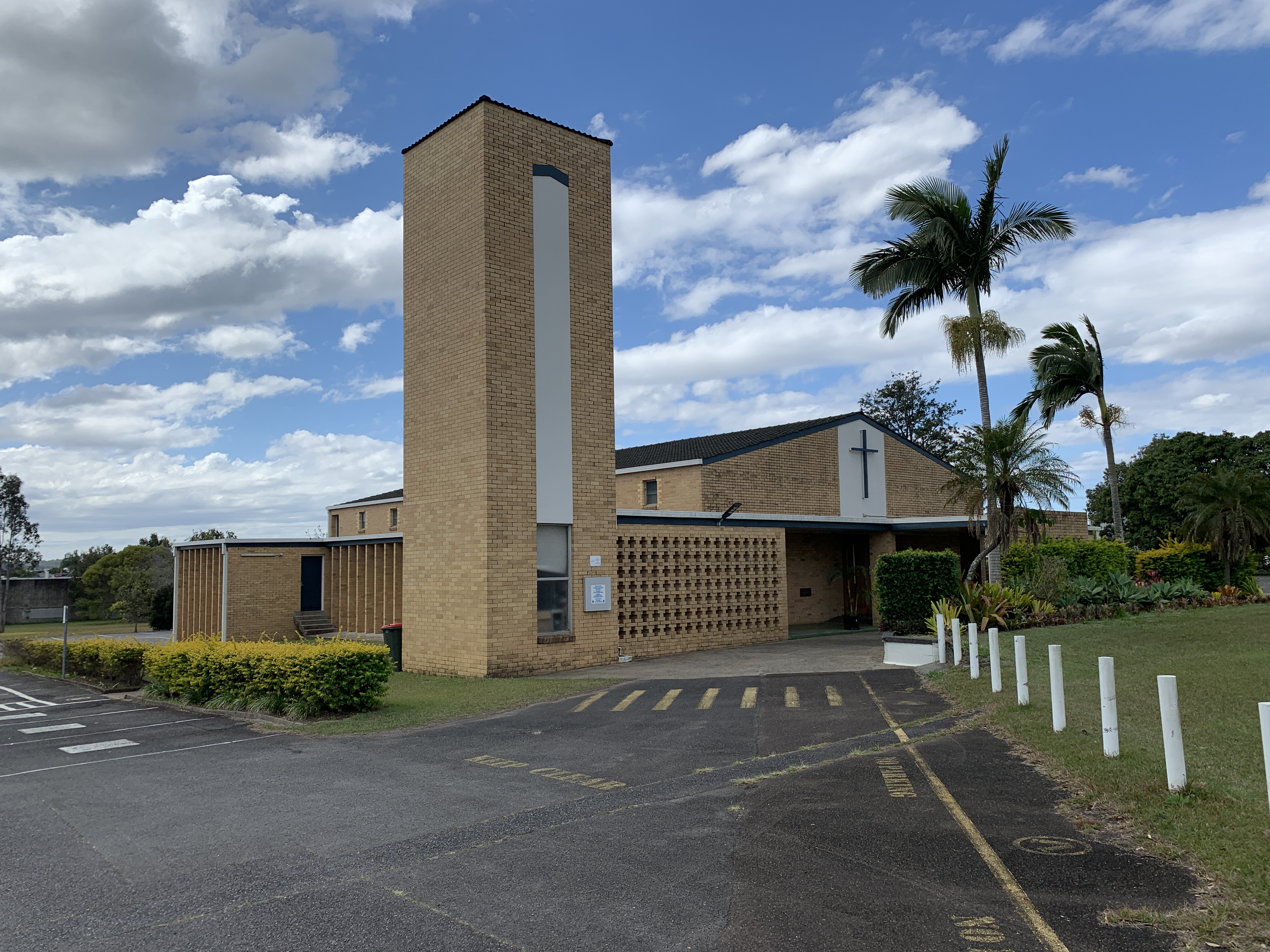
Our Lady of Fatima Catholic Church (built 1966), 2022

Our Lady of Fatima Catholic Church was established on 5 acres (2.0 ha) on land on the corner of Beaudesert and Mortimer Roads in Coopers Plains which was bought in April 1949 from Arthur Harper for £2250 by the parish priest of Moorooka, Father Flanagan. He also arranged for an old army hut to be relocated from the Archerfield Airport to the church site and spent £720 converting the building into a church. The church was officially dedicated on Sunday 26 March 1950 by James Duhig, the Archbishop of Brisbane, with about 150 people attending. Two further army huts were relocated to the site. One of them was used to establish Our Lady of Fatima Primary School which opened on 25 January 1954. At its opening, the school had 78 pupils taught by two Sisters of St Joseph led by Sister Ibar. On 5 June 1966, Archbishop Patrick Mary O'Donnell opened the new brick church building, with the former church building being used as a hall. On 24 January 1971, the new school was officially opened by Bishop Henry Joseph Kennedy with 8 classrooms, an office, a staff room and a sick room. By that time, there were 260 students and 7 staff.

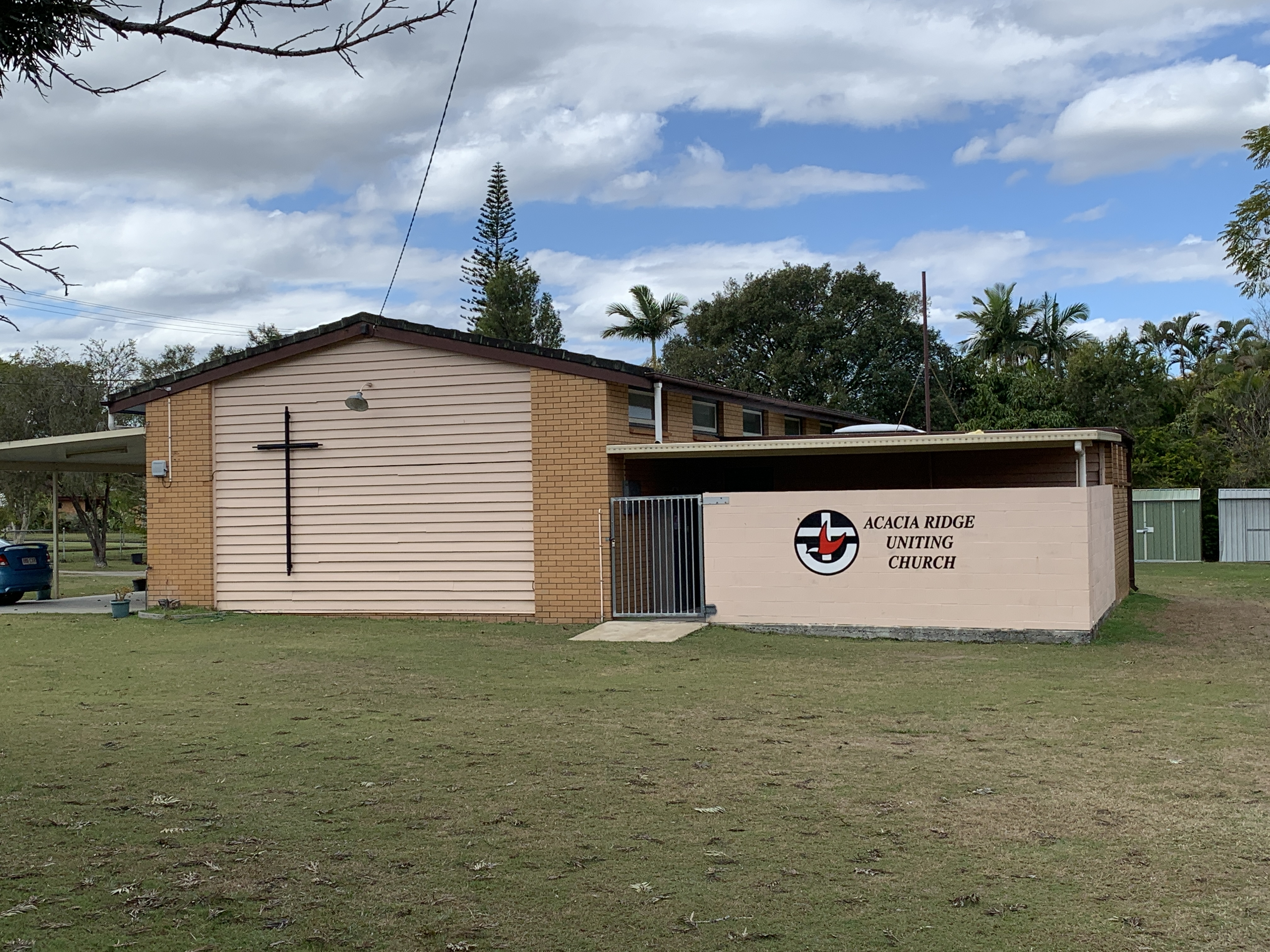
Acacia Ridge Uniting Church (formerly Methodist), 2022

Acacia Ridge Methodist Church was established in 1966. On the creation of the Uniting Church in Australia in 1977, it became the Acacia Ridge Uniting Church.

Watson Road State School opened on 23 January 1967.

Acacia Ridge State High School opened on 25 January 1971 and closed on 31 December 1997, when it amalgamated with Salisbury State High School to form the new Nyanda State High School. Acacia Ridge State High School was at 67 Nyngam Street (27.5795°S 153.0155°E). Acacia Ridge State School was then relocated onto the Nyngam Street site.

The suburb was officially named and bounded on 11 August 1975.

St Alban's Anglican Church closed circa 1980. The church building relocated to the Anglican Church of the Holy Spirit in neighbouring Algester to be used as a parish hall.

The Aboriginal and Islander Independent Community School (also known as The Murri School) was founded on the initiative of Gungalu and Birri Gubba man Ross Watson. It was opened 1 January 1986 in a disused Catholic primary school in Highgate Hill. In 1995, the school relocated to a disused state school in Milton. In 1997, the school obtained its current site in Acacia Ridge, which was the original site of Acacia Ridge State School before its relocation to the site of the former Acacia Ridge State High School, after that school's closure.

== Demographics ==
In the 2011 census, Acacia Ridge had a population of 6,945 people.

In the 2016 census, Acacia Ridge had a population of 7,429 people, 49.8% female and 50.2% male. The median age of the Acacia Ridge population was 34 years, 3 years below the national median of 37. 61.6% of people living in Acacia Ridge were born in Australia, compared to the national average of 69.8%; the next most common countries of birth were New Zealand 3.9%, India 3.1%, Philippines 2.3% and Vietnam 2%. 59.6% spoke only English at home; the next most popular languages were 2.8% Somali, 2.6% Vietnamese, 2.4% Arabic, 1.8% Spanish, 1.8% Mandarin.

In the 2021 census, Acacia Ridge had a population of 7,486 people. In 2021, 5.7% of people were Indigenous, compared to 4.6% Queensland-wide. 56.9% of people living in Acacia Ridge were born in Australia, compared to the national average of 66.9%; the next most common countries of birth were New Zealand 3.7%, India 3.5%, Philippines 2.0%, England 2.0% and Vietnam 1.9%. 58.9% spoke only English at home; the next most popular languages were 2.8% Somali, 2.5% Vietnamese, 2.2% Arabic, 1.7% Spanish and 1.7% Mandarin. The main ancestral origins of residents were English 25.9%, Australian 24.5%, Irish 7.1%, Scottish 6.3% and Australian Aboriginal 5.3%. The main religions were No religion, so described 33.9%, Catholic 16%, Islam 10.1%, Not stated 9.7% and Anglican 6.3%.

== Heritage listings ==
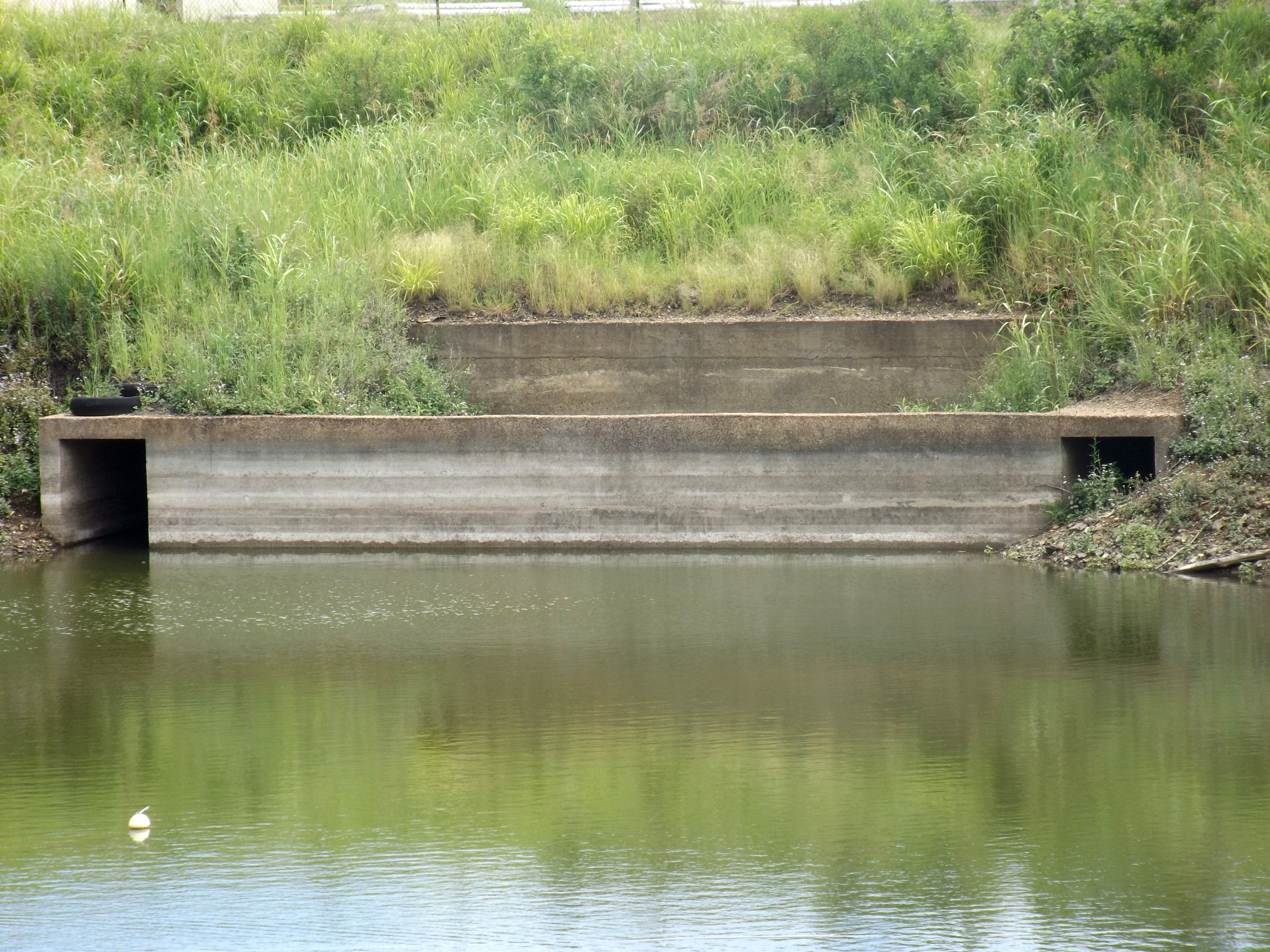
Partially submerged Acacia Ridge Air Raid Shelter in 2015

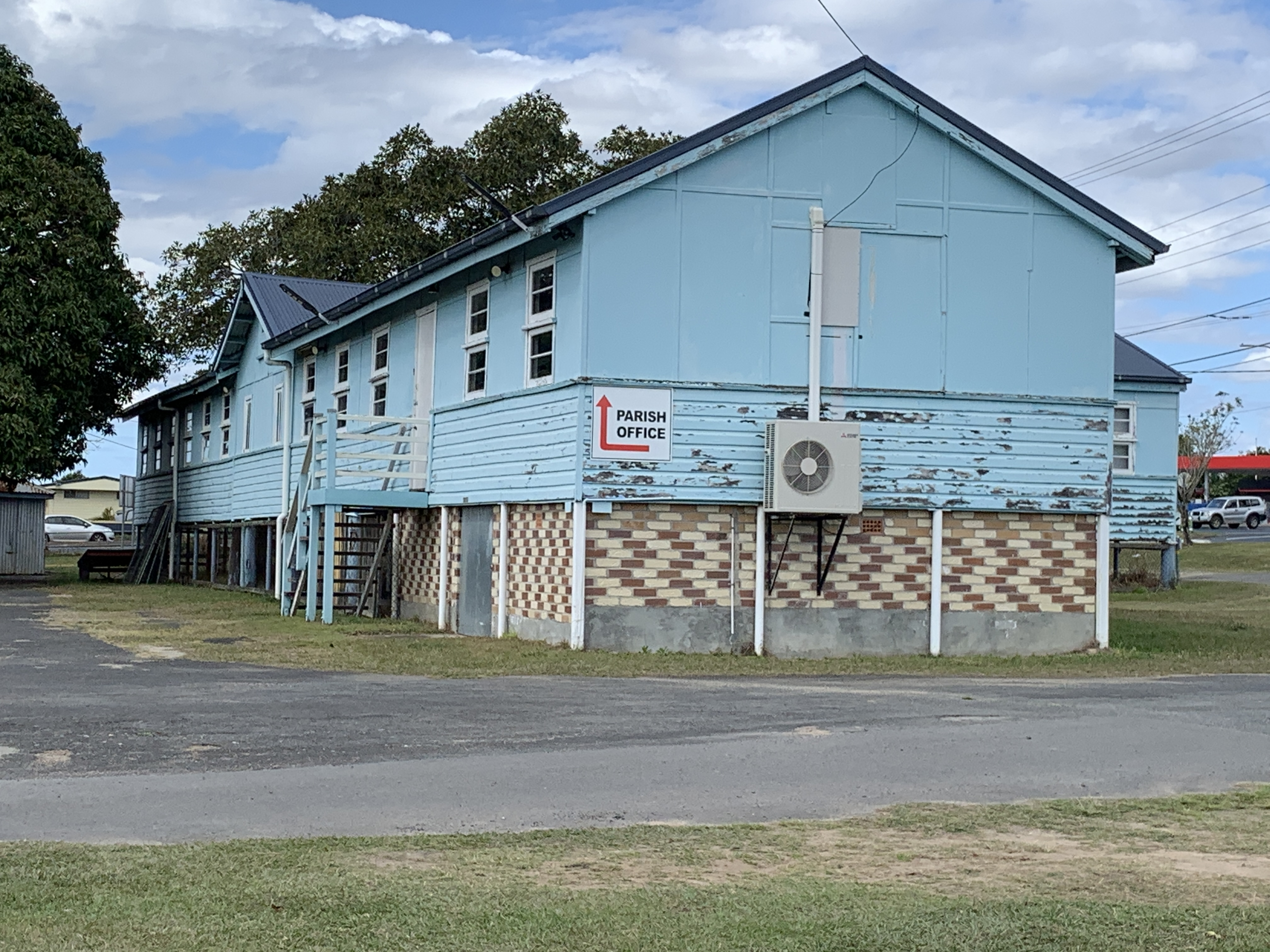
Our Lady of Fatima Catholic Church hall was the first church established in 1950, 2022

Acacia Ridge has a number of heritage-listed sites, including:

- Carr's Quarry (former), 174 Mortimer Road (27.5775°S 153.0156°E)
- Acacia Ridge Air Raid Shelter, 174 Mortimer Road (27.5771°S 153.0158°E)
- Our Lady of Fatima Catholic Church Hall, 350 Mortimer Road (27.5794°S 153.0250°E)

== Economy ==
From 1966 until the mid-1980s, the Holden Acacia Ridge Plant was one of Holden's main vehicle manufacturing plants, producing both full-sized and smaller models including the Holden Gemini. When local production of the Gemini ceased in October 1984, the manufacturing plant closed down. The manufacturer remained, retaining a small area of the site for its regional headquarters until the early 2000s, when it relocated to Murarrie. Since closure of the plant, Woolworths Group occupied the area, utilising its space as a regional distribution centre until recently, when an independent retail grocery chain resumed the site for similar purposes.

On the opposite side of Beaudesert Road from the former manufacturing plant, Toyota has based its southern Queensland regional headquarters. This site is primarily used for managerial and distribution related duties, as opposed to vehicle production.

Acacia Ridge is home to one of Queensland's largest railway freight yards, dealing with interstate freight and the break-of-gauge from 1,067 mm (3 ft 6 in) to 1,435 mm (4 ft 8 1/2 in). In 2008, the Beaudesert Road level crossing was replaced by an overbridge, so that the sidings in the yard could be extended for the shunting of longer 1500 m trains. Because space was not sufficient for all potential users of this yard. In 2009, the line between Acacia Ridge and Bromelton was converted to dual gauge to enable another break-of-gauge freight hub to be established at Bromelton in 2017.

Acacia Ridge also borders one corner of Archerfield Airport; a small, privately owned airport (27.5693°S 153.0077°E).

== Education ==
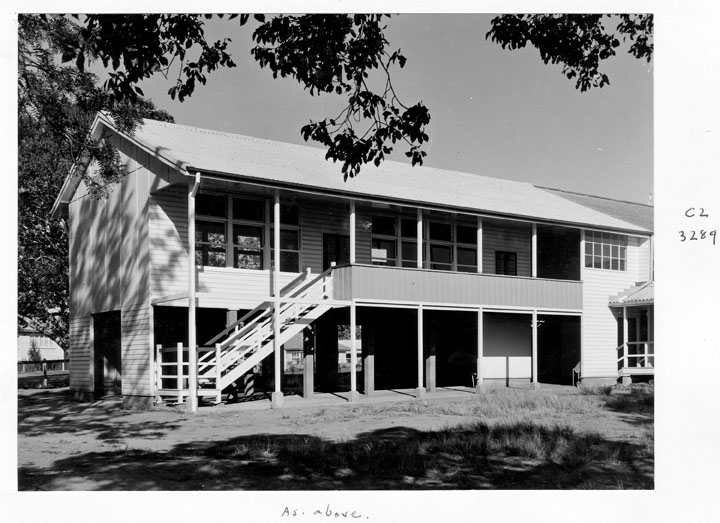
Acacia Ridge State School, August 1959

Acacia Ridge State School is a government primary (Early Childhood–6) school for boys and girls at 67 Nyngam Street (27.5795°S 153.0160°E). In 2017, the school had an enrolment of 302 students with 28 teachers (26 full-time equivalent) and 27 non-teaching staff (16 full-time equivalent). It includes a special education program.

Watson Road State School is a government primary (Prep–6) school for boys and girls at 210 Watson Road (27.5931°S 153.0184°E). In 2017, the school had an enrolment of 122 students with 15 teachers (13 full-time equivalent) and 14 non-teaching staff (9 full-time equivalent).

Lady of Fatima Primary School is a Catholic primary (Prep–6) school for boys and girls at 350 Mortimer Road (27.5791°S 153.0227°E). In 2017, the school had an enrolment of 151 students with 15 teachers (13 full-time equivalent) and 10 non-teaching staff (5 full-time equivalent).

Murri School is a private primary and secondary (Prep–12) school for boys and girls at 1277 Beaudesert Road (27.5815°S 153.0257°E). It caters for the cultural needs of Aboriginal and Torres Strait Islander students, and aims to improve the literacy, numeracy, employment and educational opportunities for its students, and has partnerships with the Aboriginal and Torres Strait Islander Community Health Service; the Institute of Urban Indigenous Health; Queensland University of Technology; University of Queensland; and Triple A Murri Country radio station. In 2017, the school had an enrolment of 245 students with 25 teachers (22 full-time equivalent) and 35 non-teaching staff (29 full-time equivalent). Murri School won the Education Award at the 2026 National NAIDOC Week Awards

YMCA Vocational School is a private secondary (7–12) facility of YMCA Vocational School at Kingston at 24 Mannington Road (27.5849°S 153.0258°E).

There are no government secondary schools in Acacia Ridge. The nearest government secondary schools are:

- Glenala State High School in Durack to the west
- Sunnybank State High School in Sunnybank to the east
- Calamvale Community College in Calamvale to the south

== Amenities ==
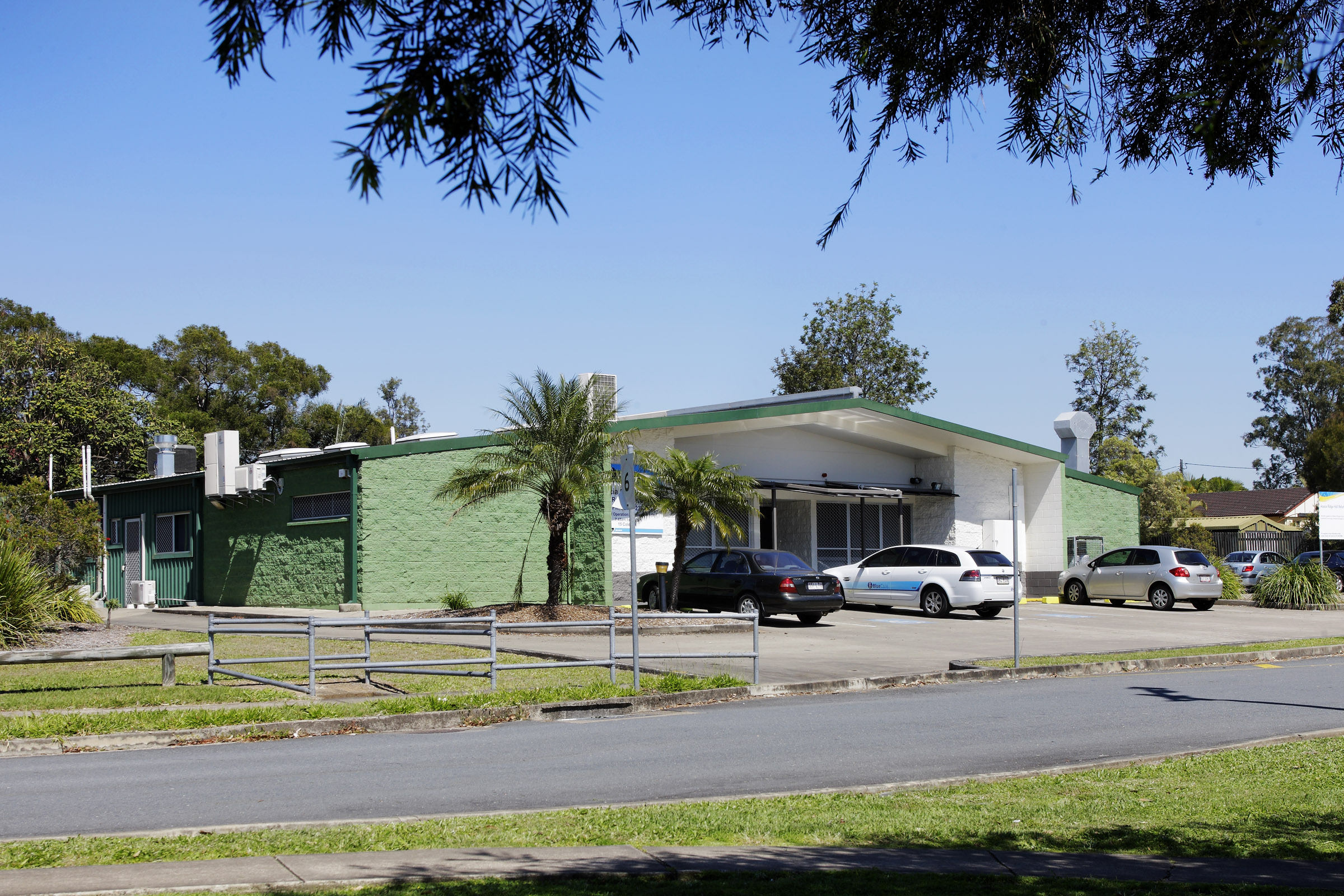
Acacia Ridge Community Centre, 2013

Brisbane City Council provides a community centre at 13 Coley Street, off Charmaine Road (27.587733°S 153.026160°E). It was formerly the Coopers Plains Senior Citizens Community Hall.

Iceworld Acacia Ridge is one of Brisbane's two ice skating rinks and is at 1179 Beaudesert Road (27.5773°S 153.0241°E).

Our Lady of Fatima Catholic Church is at 350 Mortimer Road (27.5792°S 153.0245°E).

Acacia Ridge Uniting Church is at 4 Chandler Street (27.5853°S 153.0215°E).

Acacia Ridge Church of Christ is at 51 Learoyd Road (corner of Bradman Street, 27.5981°S 153.0361°E).

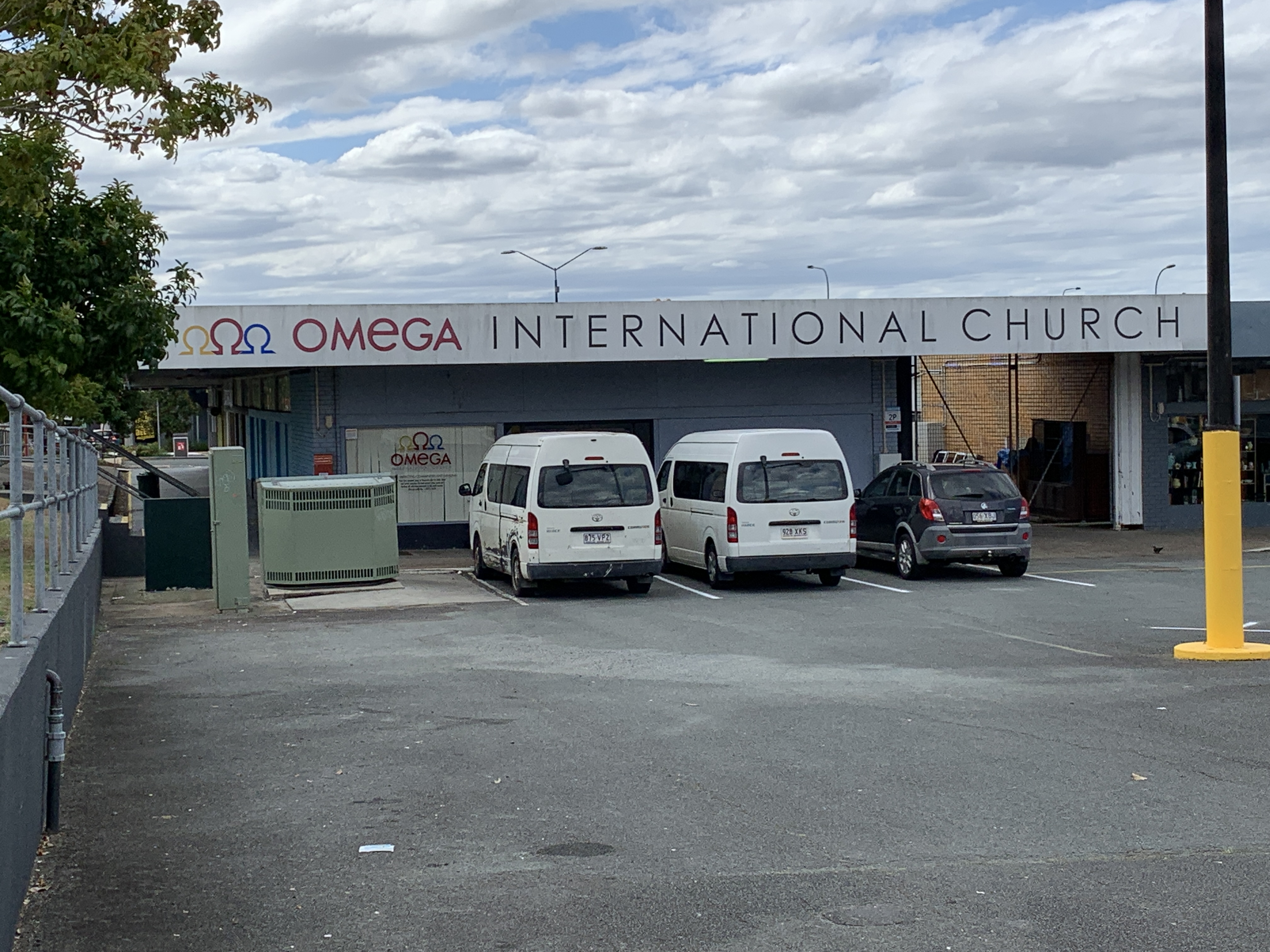
Omega International Church, 2022

Omega International Church is at 16 Mitchell Street (27.5899°S 153.0267°E).

The Samoan Acacia Ridge Church is part of the Wesleyan Methodist Church; it meets at the Omega International Church.

== Notable residents ==
- Mabior Chol, AFL player
- Steven Herrick, poet and author
- Jeff Horn, boxer
- Steve Price, rugby league player
- Johnathan Thurston, rugby league player
- Joel Turner, musician

== See also ==
- List of Brisbane suburbs
- List of rail yards

Preceding station	Journey Beyond	Following station
Coffs Harbour towards Adelaide	Great Southern	Terminus
