= Parkinson, Queensland =

Parkinson
- Suburb
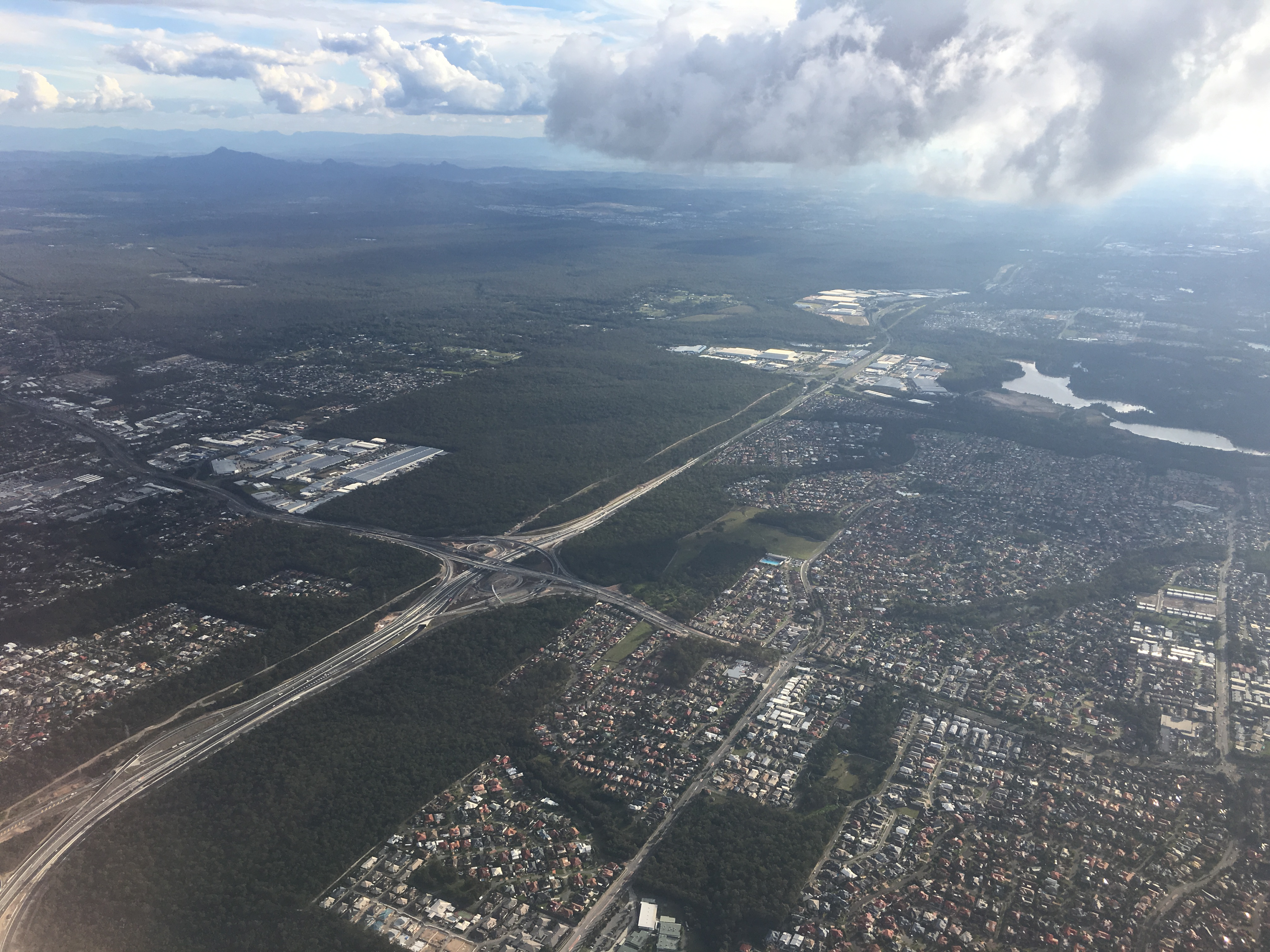
- Aerial Image of Parkinson, 2019

- Interactive map of Parkinson
- Coordinates: 27.6436°S 153.0291°E
- Country: Australia
- State: Queensland
- City: Brisbane
- LGA: City of Brisbane (Calamvale Ward)
- Location: 23.0 km (14.3 mi) S of Brisbane CBD

Government
  - State electorate: Algester
  - Federal division: Rankin

Area
  - Total: 8.2 km^{2} (3.2 sq mi)

Population
  - Total: 11,148 (2021 census)
  - Density: 1,360/km^{2} (3,521/sq mi)
- Time zone: UTC+10:00 (AEST)
- Postcode: 4115
Suburbs around Parkinson
Pallara	Algester	Calamvale
Larapinta	Parkinson	Drewvale
Forestdale	Hillcrest	Browns Plains

Parkinson is an outer southern suburb in the City of Brisbane, Queensland, Australia. In the 2021 census, Parkinson had a population of 11,148 people.

== Geography ==
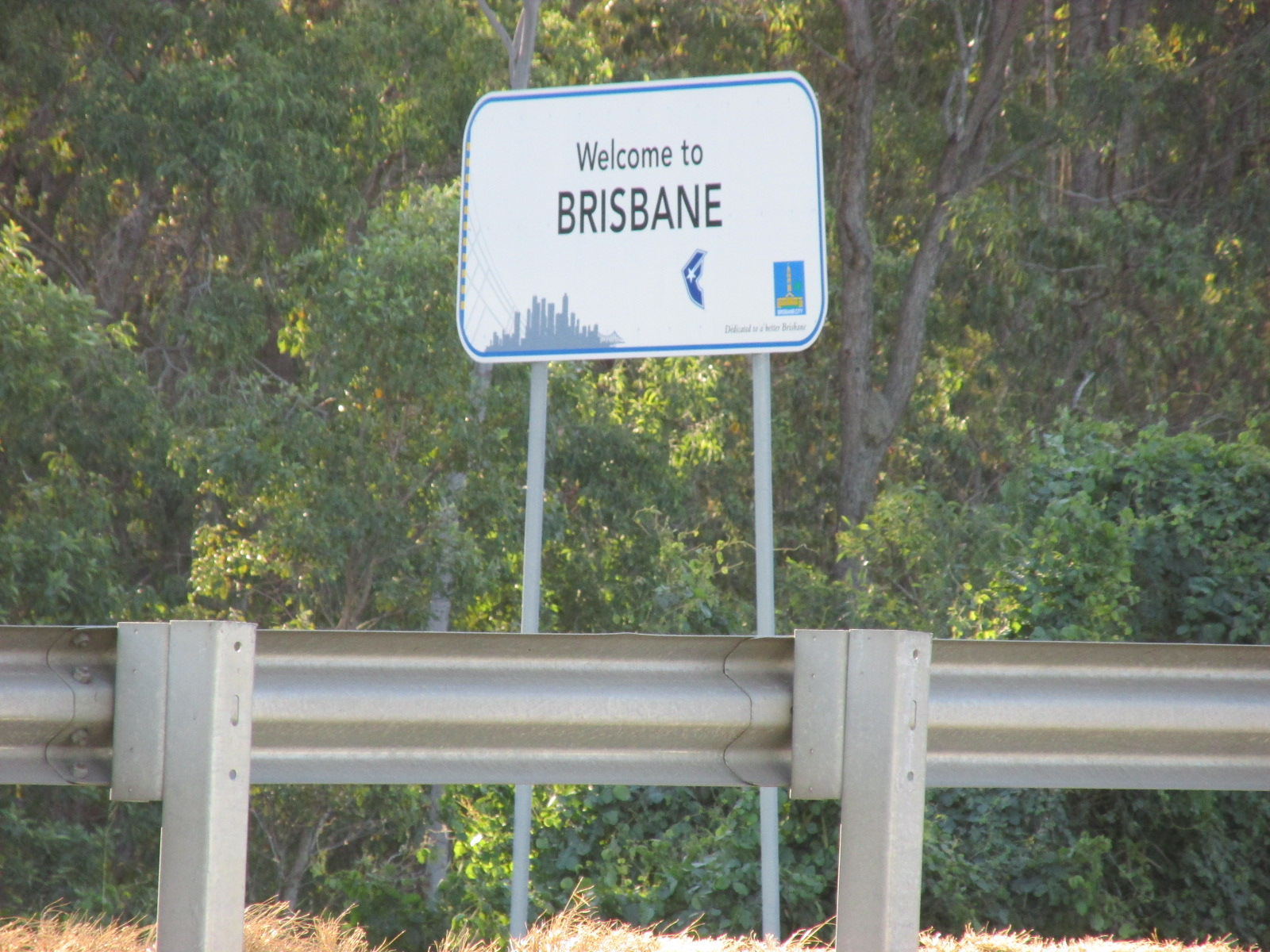
"Welcome to Brisbane" sign on the Mount Lindesay Highway, 2014

Parkinson is 23.0 kilometres (14.3 mi) by road south of the Brisbane CBD and borders Logan City.

The eastern boundary of Parkinson is marked by the Mount Lindesay Highway. The western boundary is aligned with the Sydney–Brisbane rail corridor. The Logan Motorway bisects the suburb. The northern half is mostly residential in nature with some parkland. The south remains uncleared with some industrial development emerging in the southeast corner. This corner of Parkinson is the southernmost part of the City of Brisbane.

== History ==
The suburb was named after railway engineer Henry Parkinson on 12 June 1972 by the Queensland Place Names Board.

The suburb was predominantly bushland for many years, with urban development beginning in the mid 1990s. By 2003, most of the northern areas of the suburb were developed into low density residential with further developments continuing in the western portion of the suburb. These final residential developments were completed in 2008. An industrial estate was developed in the south eastern corner of the suburb in 2009.

On 13 October 2011, Parkinson experienced an intense local thunderstorm with damaging winds, large hail and heavy rainfall. This thunderstorm was unusual compared to other storms which commonly occur in the area, due to the significant amount of hail accumulation which occurred throughout the suburb. This storm caused local flash flooding, roofs and ceilings to collapse, damaged cars and power outages. Some accumulations of ice from the storm had not melted 24 hours after the event.

== Demographics ==
In the 2011 census, Parkinson had a population of 9,539 people, 50.2% female and 49.8% male. The median age of the Parkinson population was 34 years, 3 years below the Australian median. 62.5% of people living in Parkinson were born in Australia, compared to the national average of 69.8%; the next most common countries of birth were New Zealand 5.5%, England 4.4%, South Africa 2.6%, China 2%, India 1.9%. 74.1% of people spoke only English at home; the next most common languages were 3.7% Mandarin, 3% Cantonese, 1.4% Hindi, 1.3% Spanish, 1.2% Punjabi.

In the 2016 census, Parkinson had a population of 10,878 people.

In the 2021 census, Parkinson had a population of 11,148 people.

== Education ==
YMCA is a private secondary (7-12) school for boys and girls at 61 Sandstone Street (27.6556°S 153.0368°E). It provides education specifically tailored for children who are at risk of disengaging from school.

Australian Technology and Agricultural College – Parkinson is a private secondary (10-12) campus for boys and girls of Australian Technology and Agricultural College at North Maclean at 61 Sandstone Place (27.6555°S 153.0366°E). Its focus is employability skills for children of school-leaving age targeting the trades and agriculture sectors.

There are no government schools in Parkinson. The nearest government primary schools are Algester State School in neighbouring Algester to the north, Calamvale Community College in neighbouring Calamvale to the north-east, Stretton State College in Stretton to the east and Browns Plains State School in Browns Plains to the south-west. The nearest government secondary schools are Calamvale Community College, Stretton State College, and Browns Plains State High School to the south-west.
