= 2021 Stretton state by-election =

- 24 July 2021

The district of Stretton in the Legislative Assembly of Queensland
- Registered: 33,961
- Turnout: 77.4% ▼10.4
	First party	Second party
Candidate	James Martin	Jim Bellos
Party	Labor	Liberal National
Popular vote	14,314	8,322
Percentage	56.4%	32.8%
Swing	▼0.2	▲2.6
2PP	63.9%	36.1%
2PP swing	▼0.9	▲0.9
- Map of the Electoral district of Stretton since the 2017 state election
MP before election
Duncan Pegg
Labor
Elected MP
James Martin
Labor

A by-election was held on 24 July 2021 for the Queensland Legislative Assembly seat of Stretton following the death of Duncan Pegg.

== Background ==
Duncan Pegg was first elected at the 2015 election defeating incumbent Freya Ostapovitch on a swing of over 14%. Ostapovitch had won the previously safe seat for Labor during the Liberal National Party of Queensland landslide of the 2012 election. In subsequent elections, Pegg would increase the margin of Stretton back into safe territory for Labor and saw a nearly 5% swing to himself in the 2020 election. On 22 April 2021, Pegg announced that he would be resigning from his seat to focus on his health revealing that he had been diagnosed with cancer in 2019 and that it was a terminal illness. Pegg's death was announced by his electorate office on 10 June 2021.

Two-party-preferred vote in Stretton, 2009–2020
Election	2009	2012	2015	2017	2020
Labor	59.50%	40.45%	54.98%	59.90%	64.82%
Liberal National	40.50%	59.55%	45.02%	40.10%	35.18%
Swing	+5.0	+19.03	+14.54	+4.6	+4.93
Government	ALP	LNP	ALP	ALP	ALP

== Key dates ==
Date	Event
29 June 2021	Issue of the writ
5 July 2021	Close of electoral rolls
7 July 2021	Close of nominations
12 July 2021	Early voting begins
24 July 2021	Polling day

== Candidates ==
Candidates (in ballot paper order)
Greens	Andrea Wildin	Health worker and advocate
Labor	James Martin	Electorate officer for Stretton
Liberal National	Jim Bellos OAM APM	Queensland Police Service sergeant and liaison officer
Informed Medical Options	Jasmine Melhop	Alternative medicine practitioner
Animal Justice	Suzanne Clarke	Animal and environmental advocate

== Results ==
2021 Stretton state by-election
Party	Candidate	Votes	%	±%
Labor	James Martin	14,314	56.39	−0.20
Liberal National	Jim Bellos	8,322	32.78	+2.58
Greens	Andrea Wildin	1,654	6.52	−2.20
Informed Medical Options	Jasmine Melhop	616	2.43	+2.43
Animal Justice	Suzanne Clarke	478	1.88	+1.88
Total formal votes		25,384	96.61	+0.03
Informal votes		891	3.39	−0.03
Turnout		26,275	77.37	−10.43
Two-party-preferred result
Labor	James Martin	16,244	63.94	−0.87
Liberal National	Jim Bellos	9,160	36.06	+0.87
Labor hold		Swing	−0.87	

== See also ==
- List of Queensland state by-elections
- Politics of Queensland
