= Algester =

- Suburb
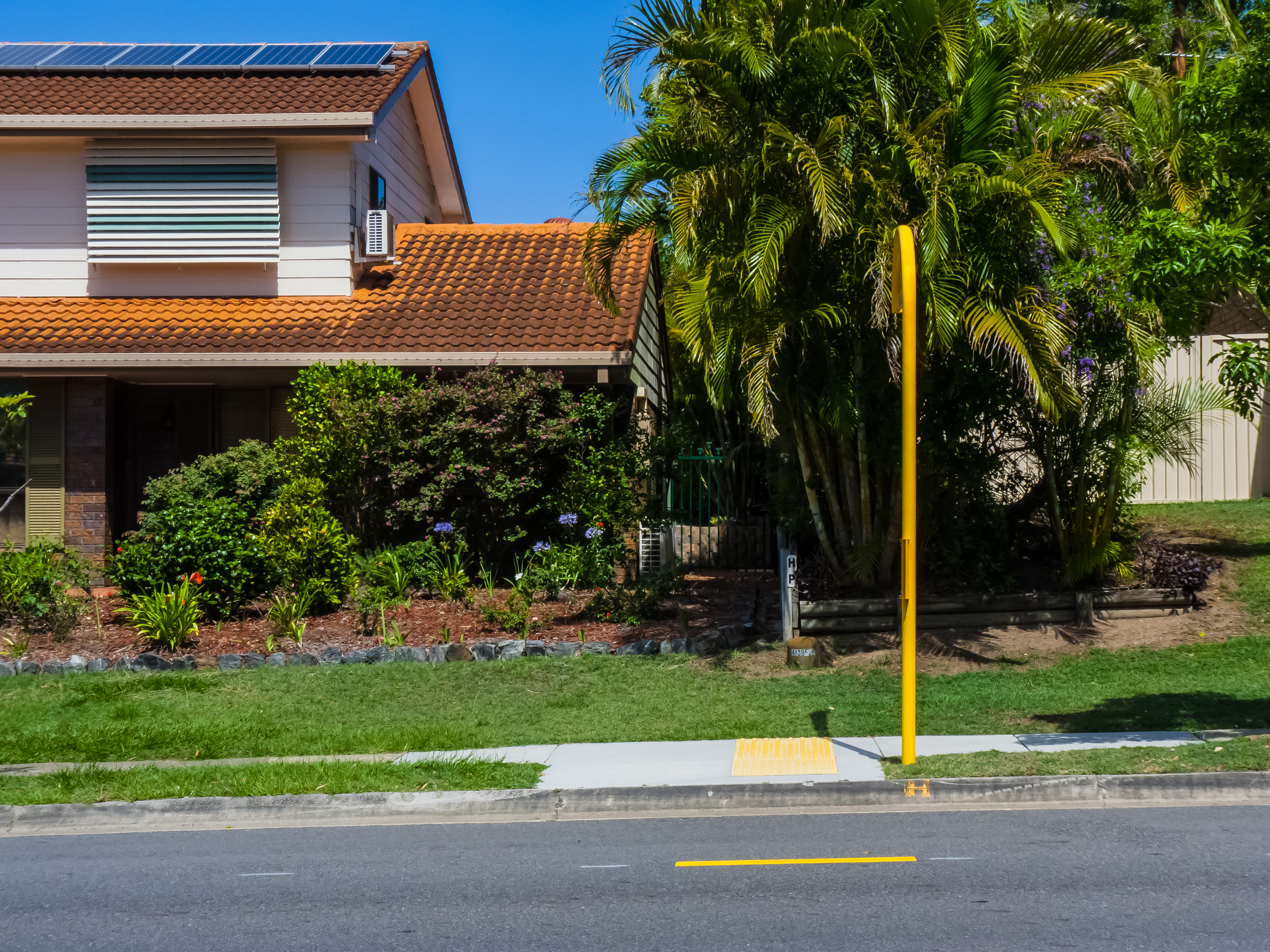
- Ridgewood Road, Algester

- Interactive map of Algester
- Coordinates: 27.6125°S 153.0336°E
- Country: Australia
- State: Queensland
- City: Brisbane
- LGA: City of Brisbane (Calamvale Ward)
- Location: 20.3 km (12.6 mi) S of Brisbane CBD
- Established: 1968

Government
  - State electorate: Algester
  - Federal division: Rankin

Area
  - Total: 3.6 km^{2} (1.4 sq mi)

Population
  - Total: 9,020 (2021 census)
  - Density: 2,510/km^{2} (6,490/sq mi)
- Time zone: UTC+10:00 (AEST)
- Postcode: 4115
Suburbs around Algester
Willawong	Acacia Ridge	Sunnybank Hills
Pallara	Algester	Calamvale
Larapinta	Parkinson	Parkinson

Algester is a southern suburb in the City of Brisbane, Queensland, Australia. In the 2021 census, Algester had a population of 9,020 people.

== Geography ==
Algester is 18 kilometres (11 mi) south-west of the central business district. The suburbs of Algester, Calamvale and now Parkinson, sit on the southern border or boundary of the City of Brisbane local government area with suburbs of Logan City such as Browns Plains and Regents Park.

== History ==
Algester was detached from Acacia Ridge and named in 1972 after Algester Road, which was a corruption of Alcester Road, named in the 1920s by subdivider F. S. Brecknell, after the main street of his home village Moseley, near Birmingham, England.

Named after Algester Road, which name is a corruption of Alcester Road, named in the 1920s by subdivider F. S. Brecknell, after the main street of his home village Mosely, near Birmingham, England. Alcester's derivation is "Fort of the River Alne". The English name Alcester possibly indicates the "Roman fort on the River Alne" (caster/cester=fort or military encampment).

In 1968, Leighton Properties planned a suburban estate with the proposed name of 'Ridgewood Heights'. Whilst the estate's main access route retains that name, the Queensland Place Names Board, substituted 'Algester' in 1972. During this time, Algester Road and Dalmeny Street were connected as non-sealed roads and the only thoroughfare into the suburb, which was then still virgin bushland. Dalmeny Street ended at the first house to be built in the suburb known then as Lot 22 (now numbered as 133). These early residents were exposed to the abundance of native Australian flora and fauna, before development in the mid-1970s. Algester was heavily developed from the mid-1970s and has also seen considerable recent development. It forms part of the Brisbane Agricultural Reserve, which once covered a large area of southern Brisbane.

Algester State School opened on 24 January 1977 with a student population of about 200.

In 1977, the Anglican Church of the Holy Spirit began with a small congregation meeting at the library of the Algester State School. In 1979 land was purchased in Algester Road and a kit home was built for a rectory with the first service being conducted on 21 October 1979 and the first baptism on 4 November 1979. In 1980 St Alban's Anglican Church at Acacia Ridge was decommissioned and the church building relocated to the Algester Road site to be used as a parish hall. The Anglican Archbishop of Brisbane, John Grindrod, laid the foundation stone for the new church building on 4 July 1981 with the first service being held in the church on 9 August 1981 with its official dedication on 18 October conducted again by John Grindrod. All debts having been paid, Archbishop Peter Hollingworth consecrated the new church on 29 May 1993.

The Islamic Society of Algester began in 1990 as the population of Moslems grew in southern Brisbane. In 1997 an old house was purchased to use as a mosque and community centre at 48 Learoyd Road. It has continued to acquire adjacent land amassing 2.5 acres (1.0 ha) where it will build a purpose-built mosque costing $4.5 million.

St Stephen's Catholic Primary School opened on 26 January 2004 on a 3.5-hectare (8.6-acre) site offering Prep to Year 3, extending each year until the full range of Prep to Year 6 was on offer.

In July 2007, a major leak of an oil pipeline resulted in the forced evacuation of residents in Algester.

== Demographics ==
In the 2006 census, Algester had a population of 7,368 people.

In the 2011 census, Algester recorded a population of 8,262 people, 51.3% female and 48.7% male. The median age of the Algester population was 34 years, 3 years below the national median of 37. 58.5% of people living in Algester were born in Australia, compared to the national average of 69.8%; the next most common countries of birth were New Zealand 7.1%, England 4%, China 2.9%, Philippines 1.8%, India 1.5%. 70.9% of people spoke only English at home; the next most popular languages were 4% Mandarin, 2.2% Cantonese, 1.2% Spanish, 0.9% Hindi, 0.8% Vietnamese.

In the 2016 census, Algester had a population of 8,433 people.

In the 2021 census, Algester had a population of 9,020 people.

== Education ==
Algester State School is a government primary (Prep–6) school for boys and girls at 19 Endiandra Street (27.6156°S 153.0319°E). In 2017, the school had an enrolment of 990 students with 68 teachers (61 full-time equivalent) and 39 non-teaching staff (24 full-time equivalent). It includes a special education program.

St Stephen's School is a Catholic primary (Prep–6) school for boys and girls at 156 Ridgewood Road (27.6181°S 153.0287°E). In 2017, the school had an enrolment of 510 students with 33 teachers (30 full-time equivalent) and 18 non-teaching staff (11 full-time equivalent).

There are no secondary schools in Algester. The nearest government secondary school is Calamvale Community College in neighbouring Calamvale to the east.

== Amenities ==
The Anglican Church of the Holy Spirit is at 362 Algester Road (27.6183°S 153.0355°E), now within Calamvale.

== Notable people ==
- Karmichael Hunt, Brisbane Broncos fullback
- Kym Tollenaere, Australian softball catcher

== See also ==
- List of Brisbane suburbs
