= Stephen Robertson (politician) =

Australian politician

The Honourable Stephen Robertson

Minister for Energy and Water Utilities of Queensland
- In office 26 March 2009 – 26 March 2012
- Premier: Anna Bligh
- Preceded by: Geoff Wilson (Energy); Craig Wallace (Water)
- Succeeded by: Mark McArdle

Minister for Health of Queensland
- In office 28 July 2005 – 26 March 2009
- Premier: Peter Beattie; Anna Bligh
- Preceded by: Gordon Nuttall
- Succeeded by: Paul Lucas

Minister for Natural Resources, Mines and Energy of Queensland
- In office 22 February 2001 – 28 July 2005
- Premier: Peter Beattie
- Preceded by: Rod Welford (Natural Resources); Tony McGrady (Mines and Energy)
- Succeeded by: Geoff Wilson

Minister for Emergency Services of Queensland
- In office 16 December 1998 – 22 February 2001
- Premier: Peter Beattie
- Preceded by: Merri Rose
- Succeeded by: Mike Reynolds

Parliamentary Secretary to the Deputy Premier
- In office 29 June 1998 – 16 December 1998
- Premier: Peter Beattie
- Preceded by: Bob Harper

Member of the Queensland Parliament for Stretton Sunnybank (1992–2001)
- In office 19 September 1992 – 24 March 2012
- Preceded by: New seat
- Succeeded by: Freya Ostapovitch

Personal details
- Born: 14 February 1962 (age 64) Aberdeen, Scotland, UK
- Party: Labor
- Spouse: Caz Osborne
- Education: Griffith University
- Occupation: Chair Healthy Land and Water

Stephen Robertson (born 14 February 1962) is an Australian politician, he is a former member of the Legislative Assembly of Queensland who represented the electoral district of Stretton for the Labor Party. He was the Minister for Natural Resources, Mines and Energy and Minister for Trade in the cabinet of Premier Anna Bligh. He had previously held the positions of Minister for Health (2005–2009) and Minister for Emergency Services (1999–2001).

== Early life ==
Robertson was born in Aberdeen, Scotland. In 1964, he migrated to Australia with his family settling in Wynnum, a bayside suburb of Brisbane where he attended Wynnum Central State School and the Wynnum State High School. He graduated from Griffith University with a Bachelor of Arts with honours from the School of Modern Asian Studies. He joined the Labor Party in 1978, and prior to his election to parliament was State Secretary and National President of the United Firefighters Union of Australia.

== Political career ==
He was first elected to the Queensland Parliament in the 1992 Queensland state election for the new electoral district of Sunnybank. He was appointed to Peter Beattie's cabinet as Minister for Emergency Services on 16 December 1999. From 22 February 2001 he was transferred to the Natural Resources and Mines portfolios, also taking on the Energy portfolio from 12 February 2004. On 28 July 2005 he became Minister for Health, but resumed his former position of Minister for Natural Resources, Mines, Energy and Trade after a cabinet reshuffle in March 2009. In 2011 he was appointed Minister for Energy and Water Utilities.

He is a member of Labor's left-wing faction, and at one stage had Graham Perrett, the current federal Member for Moreton, working for him. He retired prior to the 2012 Queensland state election. Labor preselection in his seat of Stretton was subsequently won by Duncan Pegg, but the seat was won by the LNP's Freya Ostapovitch.

Parliament of Queensland
New division	Member for Sunnybank; 1992–2001	Succeeded by Judy Spence
New division	Member for Stretton; 2001–2012	Succeeded by Freya Ostapovitch
