= Kym Tollenaere =

Australian softball player

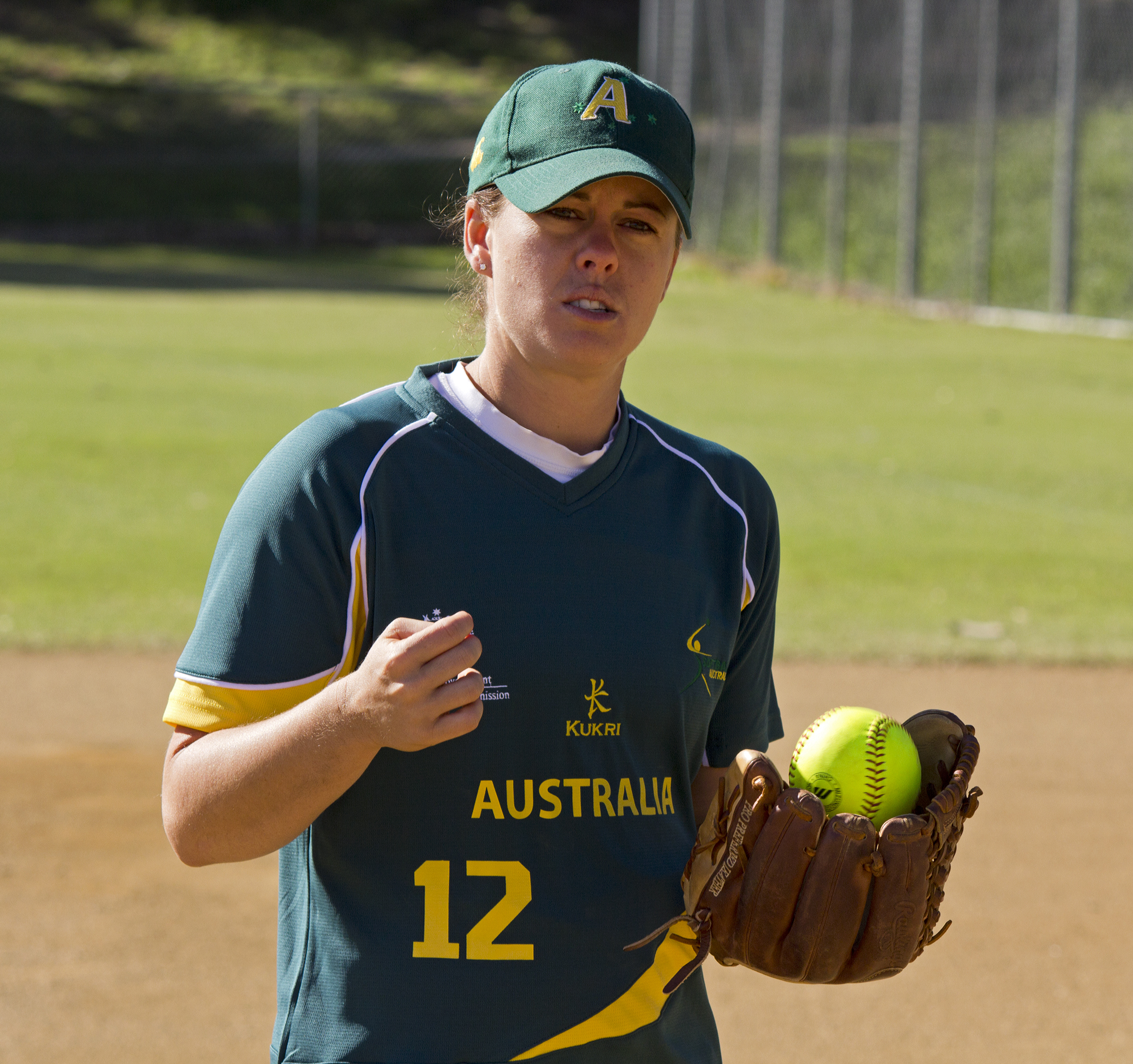
- Tollenaere in March 2012 during a photoshoot

Personal information
- Born: 8 June 1979 (age 47) Queensland, Australia

Sport
- Country: Australia
- Sport: Softball
- Event: Women's team
- Turned pro: 2000
Medal record
Softball
Representing Australia
Canada Cup
| Gold medal – first place | 2005 Cup | Team |
Pacific Rim Championships
| Silver medal – second place | 2005 Championships | Team |
World Cup
| Bronze medal – third place | 2005 Cup | Team |

Kym Tollenaere (born Queensland, Australia) is an Australian softball catcher who lives in Queensland, whom she represents in national competitions. She has represented Australia as a member of the Australia women's national softball team. She made the training squad but ultimately did not represent Australia at the 2004 Summer Olympics. As a member of the national team, she earned a gold medal at the 2005 Canada Cup, a silver at the 2005 Pacific Rim tournament and a bronze medal at the 2005 World Cup. She is trying to secure a sport on the squad that will compete at the 2012 ISF XIII Women's World Championships. She has played softball professionally in Japan.

== Personal ==
Tollenaere was born on 8 June 1979 in Queensland, and currently resides in Queensland. She was living in Eight Mile Plains, Queensland in 2004, and living in Algester, Queensland in 2009. Her cousin was a striker for the Brisbane Roar.

== Softball ==
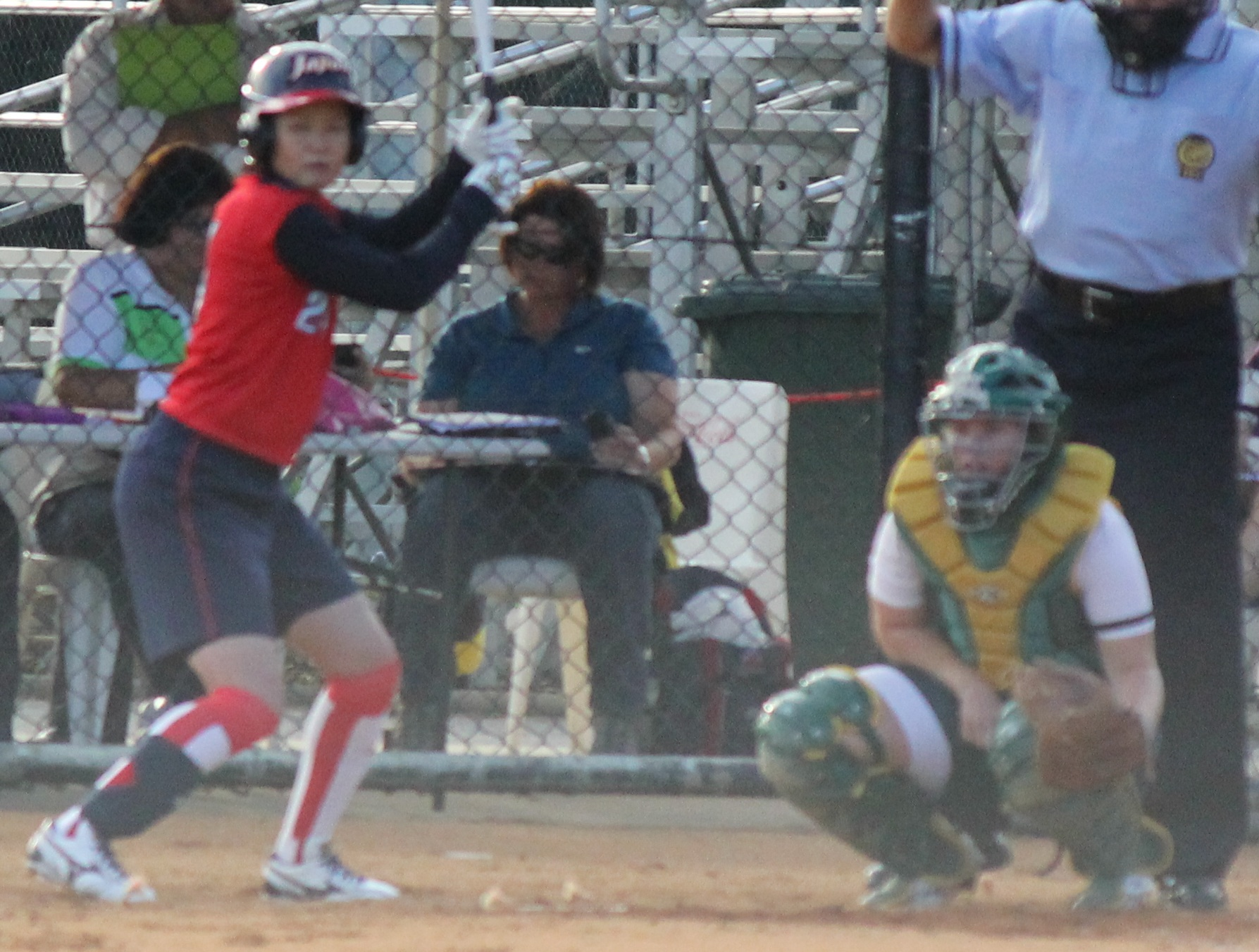
Tollenaere catching in a test match again Japan

Tollenaere is a catcher and third baseman. Her jersey number in club competitions is 40. She has had a softball scholarship from the Queensland Academy of Sport. In 2003, she competed in the NSWIS Cup. During the competition, she went eight for twelve in hitting and earned the competition's batting award. In 2008, she competed in the Queensland Open Women's State Championships. She plays for the Waverley Softball Association.

Tollenaere represents Queensland in national competitions. She was a member of the Queensland team in 2003, 2004, 2005, 2008 and 2009. She became one of the state's top two catchers on the senior side in 2003, where she rotated with Marissa Carpadios. In 2009, she represented Queensland at the national championships being held in New South Wales. She played in the final round. Her performance was important as it impacted on selection to the 2009 Australian Institute of Sport team.

=== Senior national team ===
Tollenaere has had the attention of the national team for many years. In 2000, she was not considered by the national team to be one Australia's top ten domestic catchers, but by 2003, she was Australia's number two catcher because other Australian catchers were injured or had retired and she had improved her own game. She was a member of the 2003 team that competed in the Canada Cup, and played in the game against China, where opposition players tried unsuccessfully to intimidate her. She was in a possible for the 2004 Summer Olympics team. In January 2004, she was named to the Australian Institute of Sport squad and given a scholarship. The team had 25 players and was the one that Olympic selectors would choose from to compete at the Games. In the end, she did not make the 2004 Olympic team. As a member of the 2005 national team, she earned a gold medal at the 2005 Canada Cup, a silver at the Pacific Rim tournament and a bronze medal at the World Cup. She was a member of the national team in 2007 and participated in a six-game test series against China in the Redlands. She is a member of the 2012 Australia women's national softball team and is trying to secure a sport on the squad that will compete at the 2012 ISF XIII Women's World Championships.

=== Professional softball ===
Tollenaere has played professional softball. She played for the Sanyo professional club in Japan in 2000 and 2001. During those two years, she practiced four hours a day, seven days a week, put in more effort with training and took off 15 kilograms (33 lb) in weight. By them end of her time with the team, she had lost 18 kilograms (40 lb). At the end of 2005, she had signed a contract to play with the Connecticut Breakettes in the US Pro League.
