= 98.9 FM (Brisbane) =

4AAA
- Brisbane, Queensland; Australia
- Broadcast area: Brisbane RA1
- Frequency: 98.9 MHz
- Branding: Channel 316

Programming
- Language: English
- Format: Indigenous Australian programming

Ownership
- Owner: Brisbane Indigenous Media Association

History
- First air date: 6 April 1993

Technical information
- Licensing authority: ACMA
- ERP: 9,500 watts
- HAAT: 283 m (928 ft)
- Transmitter coordinates: 27°27′47″S 152°56′49″E

Links
- Public licence information: Profile
- Website: Official website

98.9 FM (callsign 4AAA), also known as Triple A Murri Country (or just Murri Country), is an Australian community radio station that caters to the Aboriginal and Torres Strait Islander communities in metropolitan Brisbane, Queensland.

== Background ==
Murri Country was born in a time of the Aboriginal protest movement in the 1980s and 1990s. Murri Hour aired on another Brisbane radio station, 4ZZZ, from 1984 to 1993, initiated by Gungalu and Birri Gubba coordinator of the Black Protest Committee, Ross Watson. Starting as a daily pre-recorded 20-minute segment, by the end of the second year, it ran for 16 hours a week. Watson was also the founder and editor of the Black Nation newspaper. (Note: Watson was also a leader of the 1982 Commonwealth Games protests, insisting on peaceful conduct. He also founded of the Murri School at 1277 Beaudesert Road, Acacia Ridge. He died in May 2013. His funeral was held at the school on 17 May.)

In 1988 the Brisbane Indigenous Media Association (BIMA) was founded on the initiative of Watson, to cover radio, publishing, and filmmaking. Also in 1988, BIMA was granted a community radio licence to expand Murri Radio, but plans stalled after competing community groups appealed. The Aboriginal and Torres Strait Islander Commission (ATSIC) granted funding to BIMA to defend its licence after BIMA representatives had driven to Sydney to address ATSIC's inaugural board meeting.

In 1991 the Australian Broadcasting Tribunal issued the broadcast licence to 4AAA Murri Country, and BIMA made its first broadcast on 98.9FM as 4AAA Murri Country on Tuesday, 6 April 1993. Along with other prominent community members and the founding staff, the opening was attended and opened by Senator Neville Bonner.

The studios were located at Rocklea for 18 years, before moving to a new building at West End in April 2011.

== Description ==
98.9 FM, also known as Triple A Murri Country or just Murri Country, is an Australian community radio station that caters to Aboriginal and Torres Strait Islander communities in Brisbane. Focusing on Indigenous and other Australian country music, the station's programs include Breakfast Show, with Jharal Yow Yeh & Tariana Olive; and Drive Show, with Clay Cassar-Daley & Emma MacNeill. It broadcasts to the Brisbane RA1 area.

The facilities at the West End studios include three digital and one analogue studio, state-of-the art recording studio and booth, three-camera television studio and control room, a training centre, and more.

98.9 FM is part of the National Indigenous Radio Service, a satellite network of over 120 community radio stations, with which it is co-located.

== Exhibition ==
In 2019, the State Library Of Queensland held an exhibition titled I Heard it on the Radio: 25 years of 98.9fm Murri Country.

== See also ==
- List of radio stations in Australia
