= Sunnybank Hills =

- Suburb
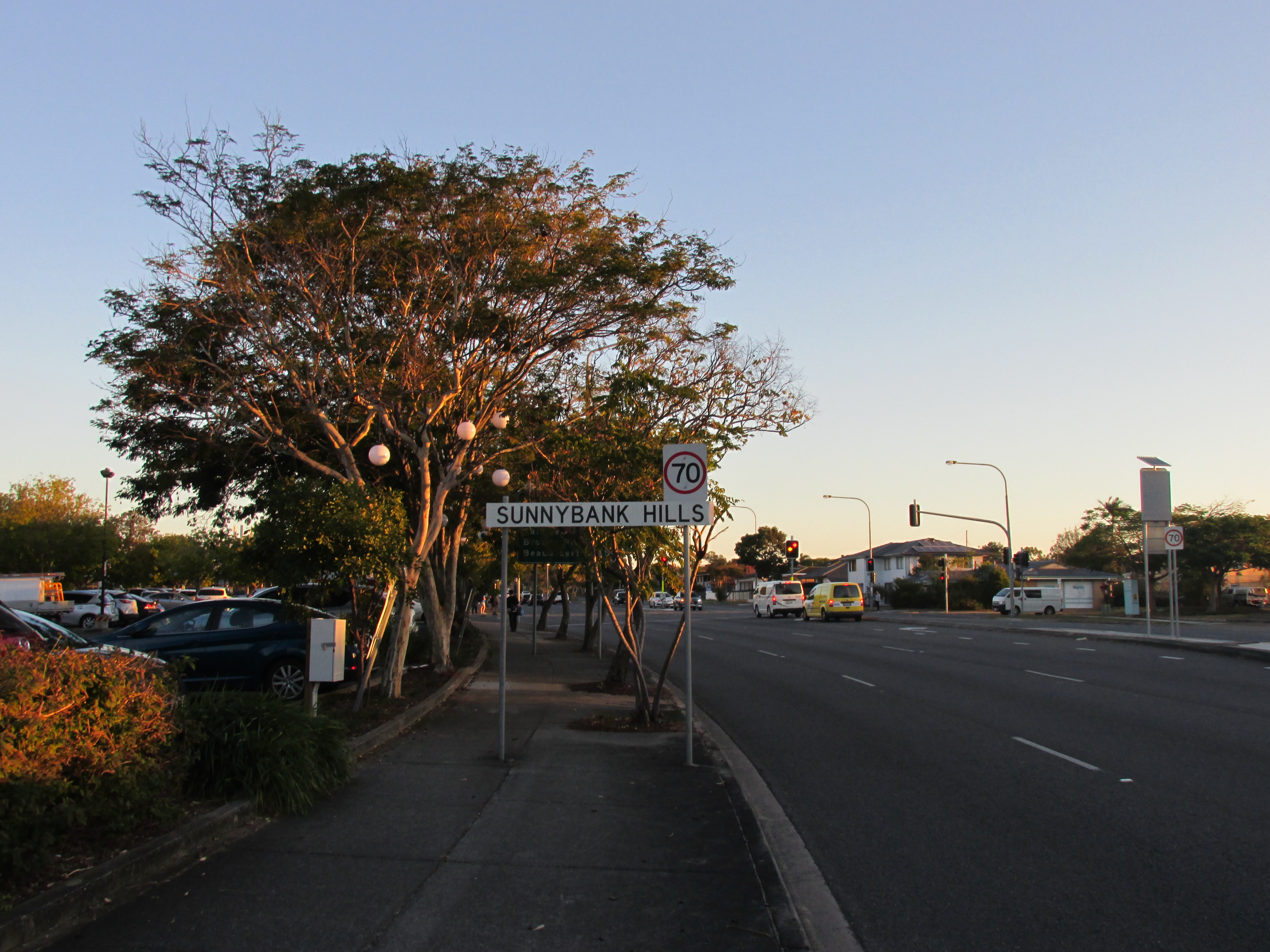
- Pinelands Road, 2018

- Interactive map of Sunnybank Hills
- Coordinates: 27.5955°S 153.0516°E
- Country: Australia
- State: Queensland
- City: Brisbane
- LGA: City of Brisbane (Runcorn Ward)
- Location: 17.9 km (11.1 mi) S of Brisbane CBD; 9 km (5.6 mi) NW of Logan Central; 66 km (41 mi) NW of Surfers Paradise
- Established: 1971

Government
  - State electorate: Stretton
  - Federal division: Moreton

Area
  - Total: 6.5 km^{2} (2.5 sq mi)
- Elevation: 84 m (276 ft)

Population
  - Total: 18,085 (2021 census)
  - Density: 2,782/km^{2} (7,210/sq mi)
- Time zone: UTC+10:00 (AEST)
- Postcode: 4109
Suburbs around Sunnybank Hills
Acacia Ridge	Sunnybank	Sunnybank
Acacia Ridge	Sunnybank Hills	Runcorn
Algester	Calamvale	Stretton

Sunnybank Hills is an outer southern suburb in the City of Brisbane, Queensland, Australia. In the 2021 census, Sunnybank Hills had a population of 18,085.

== Geography ==
Sunnybank Hills is about 17 kilometres (11 mi) from Brisbane CBD, in Queensland, Australia. It is a large suburb, and adjoins the suburbs of Calamvale, Coopers Plains, Sunnybank, MacGregor, Algester, Acacia Ridge and Runcorn.

Sunnybank Hills has numerous ridges and hills, with lower wetter areas in the north and east. These form the marshes near Sunnybank and Runcorn railway stations. There are many parks and greenspaces in the area. The soil is fertile and watered by numerous small creeks, including a large one that flows north–south across the suburb, and the suburb borders on the small wildfowl habitat and wetlands of neighbouring Calamvale Creek.

== History ==
Sunnybank Hills was originally part of a much larger area known as Coopers Plains. In 1885, the railway line was extended from Yeerongpilly, and names had to be given to the railway stations built along the line. One of the stations was named after a local farm, Sunny Brae, when 2 acres (8,100 m^{2}) of land were taken over for the railway. Brae is the Scottish word for the English word bank, so the area was given boundaries and named Sunnybank. The area of Sunnybank Hills was officially defined in 1971, although it had been unofficially called this for many years.

Autism Therapy & Education Centre opened on 23 July 1977.

Sunnybank Hills State School No 1889 opened on 30 January 1979.

The Sunnybank Hills Public Library opened in 1987 with a major refurbishment in 2009.

== Demographics ==
In the 2021 census, Sunnybank Hills had a population of 18,085 with 32.3% describing their ancestry as Chinese. This is followed by 16.8% describing their ancestry as English, and 15.3% as Australian. The ethnic Chinese community is extremely diverse with migrants born in Mainland China, Taiwan, Hong Kong as well as second and third generation Australians of Chinese descent. 43.1% of Sunnybank residents were born in Australia, followed by 15.1% in Mainland China, 6% in Taiwan and 2.1% in Hong Kong, and 67% of residents had both of their parents born overseas. 40.1% spoke only English at home followed by the next most common languages: 23.8% Mandarin, 6.3% Cantonese, 2.3% Punjabi. The high use of Cantonese with Hong Kong not reflected in place of birth indicates that most residents of Hong Kong descent are second and third generation Australians.

In the 2016 census, Sunnybank Hills had a population of 18,085. Sunnybank Hills includes the largest communities of both Chinese Australians (5,647 people; 25.4%) and Serbian Australians (178 people; 1.0%) of any suburb in Queensland. Almost half (47%) of the family households in the suburb were couples with children, 35% were couples without children, 15% are single-parent households, and 3% are classified as "other family". The great majority (85%) of the dwellings in the suburb are stand-alone houses; townhouses account for another 12%. The houses are mainly modern brick and tile houses but there is a sprinkling of post-war weatherboard homes in the area. The most common religious affiliation was "No Religion" (24.3%); the next most common responses were Catholic 20.1%, Anglican 9.6%, Buddhism 9.0% and Uniting Church 5.5%.

In the 2011 census, Sunnybank Hills recorded a population of 16,830: 50.4% female and 49.6% male. The median age was 34 years, 3 years below the Australian median. Children aged under 15 years made up 16.3% of the population and people aged 65 years and over made up 12.4% of the population. Sunnybank Hills is a very multicultural suburb. 46.7% of people living in Sunnybank Hills were born in Australia, compared to the national average of 69.8%; the next most common countries of birth were China 10.5%, Taiwan 6.6%, New Zealand 4.3%, India 2.5%, England 2.2%. Just under half (49.7%) the population spoke only English at home; the next most popular languages were 17.8% Mandarin, 6.5% Cantonese, 2.3% Vietnamese, 2.2% Korean, 1.2% Greek.

== Amenities ==
The Brisbane City Council operates a public library in Sunnybank Hills in the Sunnybank Hills Shopping Centre at the corner of Compton and Calam Roads.

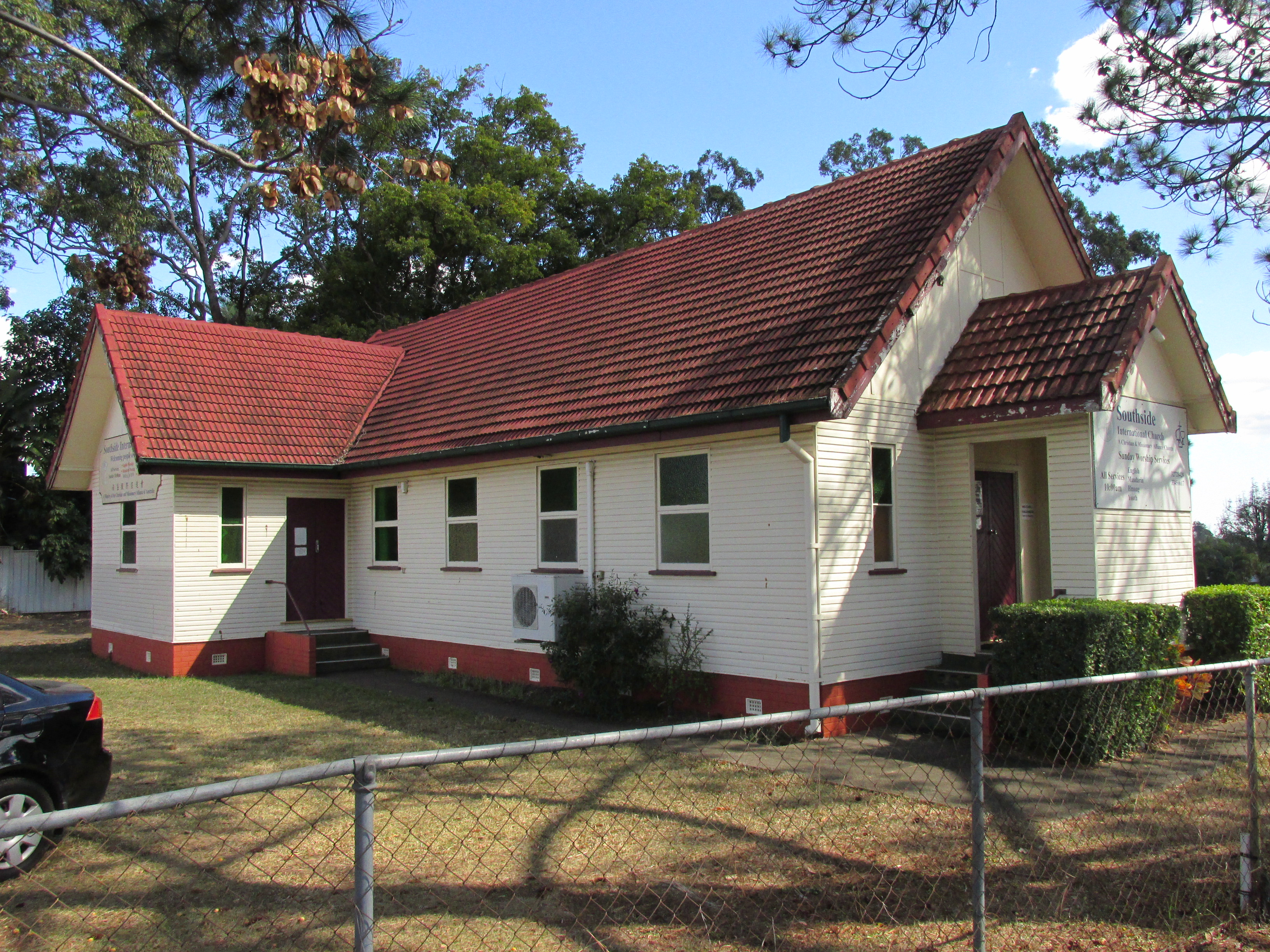
The Southside Church in Sunnybank Hills

Churches in Sunnybank Hills include the Southside International Church on the corner of Pinelands and Beenleigh Roads, and Sunnybank Hills Uniting Church on the corner of Hellawell Road and Hillcrest Street. Many churches offer Sunday services in Mandarin, Cantonese and Korean.

The suburb is serviced by several shopping centres. These include Shauna Downs on the corner of Wynne Street and Beenleigh Road, Centro Pinelands on Mains Road, and the large Sunnybank Hills Shoppingtown on the corner of Compton & Calam Roads.

Approximately 36.9% (ABS 2021 Census) of the population has Asian ancestry, and the cultural scene is brought to life with many Asian restaurants, along with numerous coffee shops and eateries of many cultures. Restaurants in Sunnybank Hills and neighbouring Sunnybank include Thai, Korean, Vietnamese, Chinese, Japanese, Indian and Italian cuisines.

== Education ==
Sunnybank Hills State School is a government primary (Prep–6) school for boys and girls at 77 Symons Road (27.5952°S 153.0562°E). In 2018, the school had an enrolment of 1,376 students with 94 teachers (84 full-time equivalent) and 59 non-teaching staff (38 full-time equivalent). It includes a special education program.

Autism Queensland Education & Therapy Centre is a private primary and secondary (Prep–12) school for boys and girls at 437 Hellawell Road (27.5974°S 153.0431°E). In 2018, the school had an enrolment of 144 students with 24 teachers (18 full-time equivalent) and 85 non-teaching staff (37 full-time equivalent).

There is no government secondary school in Sunnybank Hills. The nearest government secondary school is Sunnybank State High School in neighbouring Sunnybank to the north.

== Transport ==
Many bus stops with buses running directly to the city every couple of minutes during peak times (does not require transfer). The suburb is also serviced by the train stations, Sunnybank and Altandi, which provide services to the Brisbane CBD and Beenleigh lines.
