= Acacia Ridge Air Raid Shelter =

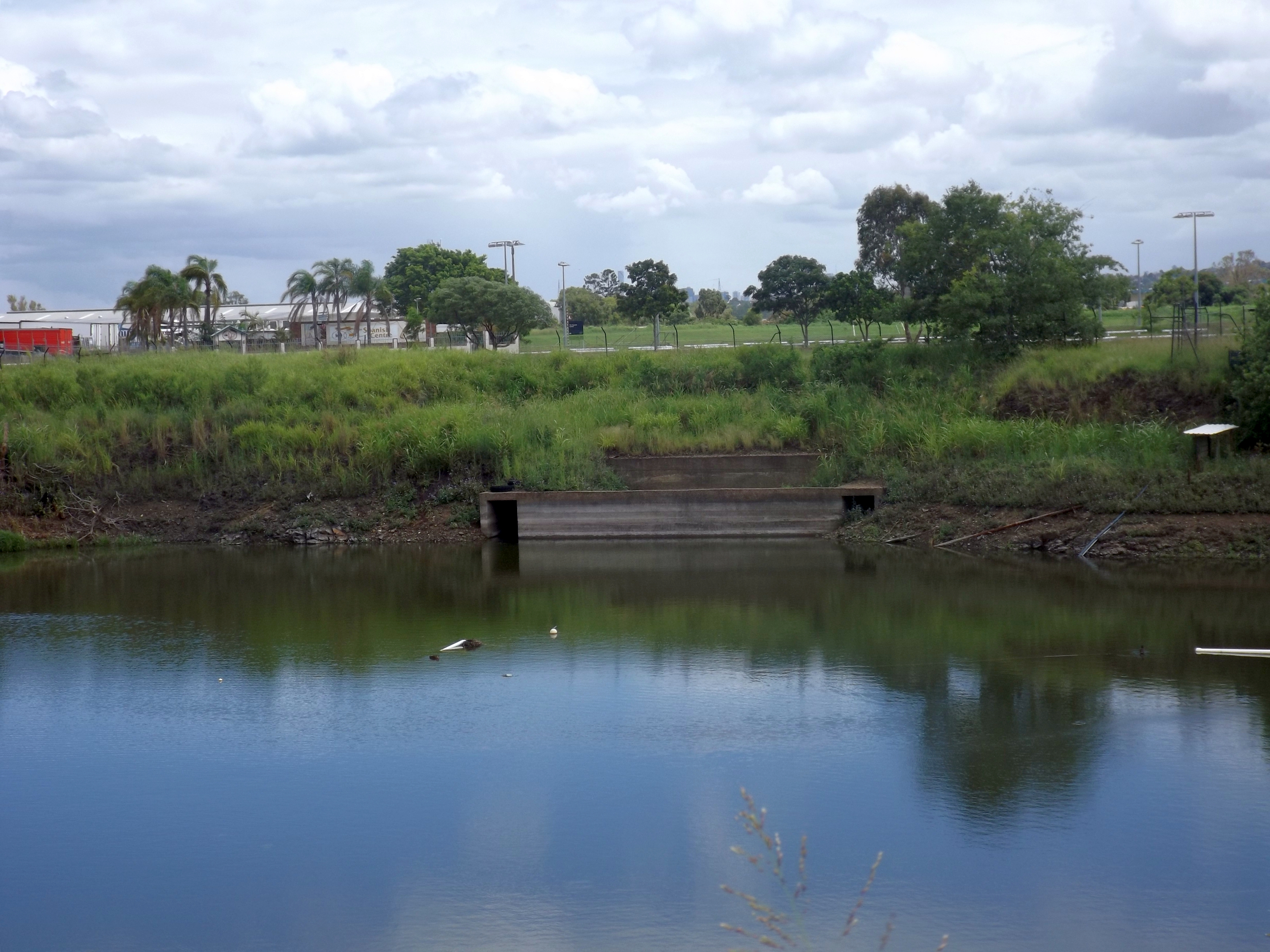
- Air Raid Shelter and inundated quarry

- Location within Queensland Location within Australia
- 27.577°S 153.016°E
- Location: 174 Mortimer Road, Acacia Ridge, City of Brisbane, Queensland, Australia

History
- Design period: 1939–1945 (World War II)
- Built: c. 1942 – c. 1943

Queensland Heritage Register
- Official name: Acacia Ridge Air Raid Shelter
- Type: state heritage (built)
- Designated: 6 April 2005
- Reference no.: 602487
- Significant period: 1942–1943 (fabric); 1940s (historical)
- Significant components: wall/s – blast
- Builders: Allied Works Council

Acacia Ridge Air Raid Shelter is a heritage-listed former air raid shelter at 174 Mortimer Road, Acacia Ridge, City of Brisbane, Queensland, Australia. It was built from c. 1942 to c. 1943 by Allied Works Council. It was added to the Queensland Heritage Register on 6 April 2005. Today, you can find it near Mortimer Road Park, where it lies.

== History ==
The air raid shelter is built into the north face of the old Archerfield Quarry, or Carr's Quarry, in the southwest corner of the Mortimer Road Reserve, which is bounded by Mortimer Road and Beatty Road, Acacia Ridge.

Archerfield remained largely undeveloped well into the twentieth century, being used for cattle grazing, fruit trees, cotton and maize cropping. A branch railway line reached the quarry, used to extract bluestone to be used for roads and ballast for the Kyogle railway line, in 1913, but the pit was flooded at the end of that year. Although it was closed after this event, the mine may have been used during the 1920s or 1930s. In 1922, there were about a dozen houses nearby, mostly along Beatty Road and the quarry branch line. In 1929, the Commonwealth Government resumed land at Archerfield for the construction of an airfield, and Archerfield Aerodrome later became an important base for the Australian, British, American and Dutch air forces during World War II.

On 7 December 1941, the United States of America entered World War II following the bombing of the American fleet at Pearl Harbor in Hawaii by Japanese carrier-borne aircraft. England and its Commonwealth had been at war with Germany since September 1939, but now the war was truly global. Darwin was first bombed on 19 February 1942 and 14,000 Australians were taken prisoner following the fall of Singapore. Plans to defend Australia from an anticipated Japanese invasion and to use Queensland as a support base for the conduct of the Pacific war were implemented quickly. Australian and American personnel poured into Queensland and urgently required a wide range of new buildings and facilities.

While the American Forces were based at Archerfield, the area to the west of the intersection of Mortimer Road and Beatty Road was occupied by Camp Buckley, and large igloo hangars were built to the north of the quarry. A taxiway linking the igloos to the main aerodrome to the west passed close by the northern side of the quarry, and the air raid shelter was constructed to provide protection for military personnel stationed nearby. World War II aerial photographs show that the water level in the quarry used to be below the rock shelf on which the shelter was built. They also indicate that the building was freestanding at that time, in the middle of a cleared platform. Earth has since collapsed or been moved onto the shelf around the bunker, giving it the appearance of having been built into the quarry wall. The quarry side of the bunker was protected by an outer curtain wall, which contained entrances to two tunnels leading into the main bunker. There was about a metre between the curtain wall and the edge of the rock shelf. The Allied Works Council Minutes of 8 January 1943 record that a bomb proof building for United States Air Corps Operations had been built near the American camp, and this may refer to the shelter in the quarry.

At the end of the war military debris was dumped into the quarry. In 1963, the area was purchased by the Brisbane City Council for recreation purposes, and in 1992 amateur military historians partially drained the quarry, retrieving a number of military artefacts, including World War II machine guns, ammunition, and aircraft parts. This operation also enabled an interior inspection of the shelter, which discovered that the two entrance tunnels are 20 feet (6.1 m) long, with doorways turning into the main bunker. The remains of four-inch thick wooden sliding doors were found, along with three one-foot diameter holes in the ceiling of the bunker. The present water level in the quarry prevents internal inspection.

== Description ==
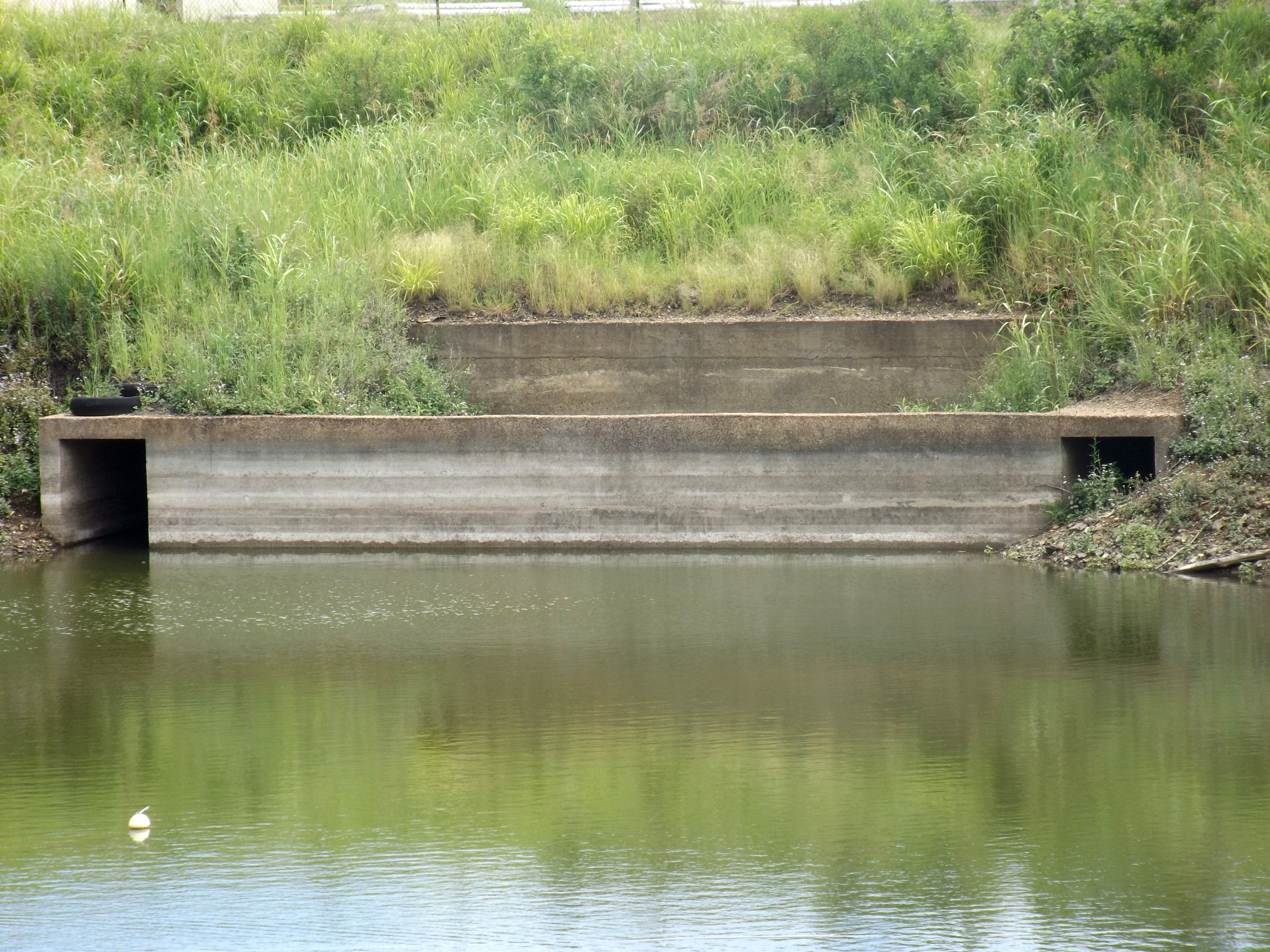
Partially submerged Air Raid Shelter in 2015

The Acacia Ridge air raid shelter is a rectangular concrete bunker built on a rock shelf cut into the north face of the former quarry. The currently exposed part of the bunker consists of two concrete walls, with a space between the two, running along part of the quarry face and returning into the quarry wall. The outer curtain wall is lower, is buttressed with concrete props, and has rectangular openings at each end. The inner bunker wall is shorter, taller, and has no visible openings. Only the top of the curtain wall is visible above the water in the quarry, and vegetation obscures the main bunker.

== Heritage listing ==
Acacia Ridge Air Raid Shelter was listed on the Queensland Heritage Register on 6 April 2005 having satisfied the following criteria.

The place is important in demonstrating the evolution or pattern of Queensland's history.

The Acacia Ridge air raid shelter is important as part of the Air Raid Precaution activities undertaken for the defence of Brisbane during World War II. Designed to afford protection for military personnel from the Archerfield aerodrome in the event of a Japanese air attack, the air raid shelter, located on a rock ledge in the north face of the Archerfield Quarry, is important in demonstrating the impact of World War II on Queensland.

The place demonstrates rare, uncommon or endangered aspects of Queensland's cultural heritage.

Although many air raid shelters were constructed during World War II in Queensland, comparatively few survive. As a shelter that was built for military personnel, and which still includes its outer curtain wall, the Acacia Ridge shelter is uncommon.

The place is important in demonstrating the principal characteristics of a particular class of cultural places.

The shelter's solid construction, and its siting near a military installation, demonstrate the principal characteristics of a World War II military air raid shelter.
