= Calamvale =

- Suburb
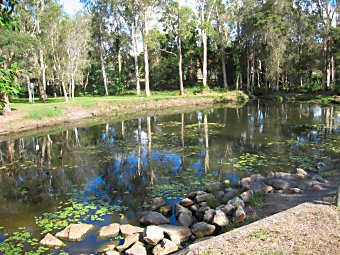
- Part of the Golden Pond wetlands at Calamvale

- Interactive map of Calamvale
- Coordinates: 27.6233°S 153.0480°E
- Country: Australia
- State: Queensland
- City: Brisbane
- LGA: City of Brisbane (Calamvale Ward)
- Location: 19.7 km (12.2 mi) S of Brisbane CBD

Government
  - State electorates: Algester; Stretton
  - Federal division: Rankin

Area
  - Total: 6.6 km^{2} (2.5 sq mi)

Population
  - Total: 17,994 (2021 census)
  - Density: 2,726/km^{2} (7,060/sq mi)
- Time zone: UTC+10:00 (AEST)
- Postcode: 4116
Suburbs around Calamvale
| Algester | Sunnybank Hills | Runcorn |
| Algester | Calamvale | Stretton |
| Parkinson | Parkinson | Drewvale |

Calamvale (/ˈkæləmveɪl/ KAL-əm-vayl is a southern suburb in the City of Brisbane, Queensland, Australia. In the 2021 census, Calamvale had a population of 17,994 people.

== Geography ==
The suburb is loosely bounded to the north by Beaudesert Road and Compton Road, to the east by Gowan Road, to the south by Illawena Street and Nottingham Road, and to the west by Algester Road.

The land use is residential housing with associated services, including shops, schools and parks.

== History ==
Calamvale was named after James Calam, an early settler and prominent landowner in the area. The Calam family built their homestead on a hill at the top of Calam Road near Beaudesert Road. The area was known as Calamvale long before it was officially listed as a suburb in 1972. In 1984, the Calams sold the homestead to the McGuire family, who built the Calamvale Hotel on the land. Urbanisation took place in the early 1990s, and development took place in several stages.

Calamvale State School opened on 11 May 1955. In January 2002, a secondary school component was added to the existing primary school to create Calamvale Community College.

In 1977 the Anglican Church of the Holy Spirit began with a small congregation meeting at the library of the Algester State School. In 1979 land was purchased in Algester Road and a kit home was built for a rectory with the first service being conducted on 21 October 1979 with the first baptist being conducted on 4 November 1979. In 1980 St Alban's Anglican Church at Acacia Ridge was decommissioned and the church building relocated to the Algester Road site to be used as a parish hall. The Anglican Archbishop of Brisbane, John Grindrod, laid the foundation stone for the new church building on 4 July 1981 with the first service being held in the church on 9 August 1981 with its official dedication on 18 October conducted again by Grindrod. All debts having been paid, Archbishop Peter Hollingworth consecrated the new church on 29 May 1993.

Calamvale Special School opened on 29 January 1985.

Wisdom College was established on 27 April 2011 as a non-denominational private school seeking to provide education to develop critical thinking with social responsibility and moral values.

== Demographics ==
In the 2016 census, Calamvale had a population of 17,124 people, 51% female and 49% male. The median age of the Calamvale population was 32 years of age, 6 years below the Australian median. 39.0% of people were born in Australia. The next most common countries of birth were China 14.9%, India 4.7%, Taiwan 4.4%, New Zealand 3.7% and Hong Kong 3.1%. 38.4% of people spoke only English at home. Other languages spoken at home included Mandarin 21.8%, Cantonese 7.2%, Korean 3.4%, Punjabi 2.3% and Vietnamese 1.9%. The most common responses for religion were No Religion, so described 34.0% and Roman Catholic 14.9%. The median household income was $1,611, higher than the Queensland and Australian median. The median mortgage repayments is $1,800 per month. The most common occupations included professionals 24.5%, clerical and administrative workers 14.6%, technicians and trades workers 11.9%, managers 10.7%, and sales workers 10.7%. Of occupied private dwellings, 24.0% were owned outright, 41.5% were owned with a mortgage and 32.2% were rented. Calamvale included the largest Macedonian Australian community of any suburb in Queensland, numbering 76 individuals and making up 0.5% of the suburb's population.

In the 2021 census, Calamvale had a population of 17,994 people. 40.6% of people were born in Australia. The next most common countries of birth were Mainland China 13.6%, India 5.9%, Taiwan 4.1%, New Zealand 3.8% and Hong Kong 2.8%. 36.6% of people spoke only English at home. Other languages spoken at home included Mandarin 21.4%, Cantonese 6.9%, Punjabi 3.6%, Korean 3.4% and Vietnamese 1.8%. The high use of Cantonese with Hong Kong not represented as high as a birthplace reflects the many second and third generation Australians of Hong Kong background. The most common responses for religion were No Religion, so described 38.2%, Roman Catholic 13.2%, Islam 7.3% and Buddhism 6%.

== Education ==
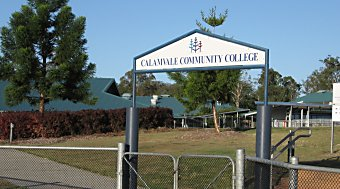
Calamvale Community College

Calamvale Community College is a government primary and secondary (Prep–12) school for boys and girls at 11 Hamish Street (27.6256°S 153.0428°E). It includes a special education program. In 2018, the school had an enrolment of 2,147 students with 162 teachers (151 full-time equivalent) and 73 non-teaching staff (53 full-time equivalent). In 2022, the school had 2,457 students with 185 teachers (173 full-time equivalent) and 85 non-teaching staff (63 full-time equivalent).

Calamvale Special School is a special primary and secondary (Prep–12) school for boys and girls at 29 Nottingham Road (27.6300°S 153.0448°E). In 2018, the school had an enrolment of 142 students with 37 teachers (33 full-time equivalent) and 62 non-teaching staff (38 full-time equivalent). In 2022, the school had 183 students with 47 teachers (42 full-time equivalent) and 63 non-teaching staff (39 full-time equivalent).

Wisdom College is a private primary and secondary (Prep–9) school for boys and girls at 97 Formby Street (27.6216°S 153.0360°E). The school is multi-cultural and, although inspired by Islam, welcomes children of all faiths. In 2018, the school had an enrolment of 282 students with 22 teachers and 11 non-teaching staff. In 2022, the school had an enrolment of 379 students with 33 teachers (31.5 full-time equivalent) and 13 non-teaching staff (12.4 full-time equivalent).

== Amenities ==
Calamvale Police Station is at 42 Kameruka Street (27.6236°S 153.0506°E).

Calamvale Shopping Centre is at 51 Kameruka Street on the south-western corner of Beaudesert Road (27.6244°S 153.0487°E).

Calamvale Marketplace is a shopping centre at 16 Nottingham Road (27.6311°S 153.0452°E).

Calamvale Central shopping centre is at 662 Compton Road on the south-western corner of Beaudesert Road (27.6130°S 153.0534°E).

The Anglican Church of the Holy Spirit is at 362 Algester Road (27.6183°S 153.0355°E).

There are a number of parks in the suburb, including :

- Algester Road Park (27.6096°S 153.0435°E)
- Alpinia Place Park (27.6233°S 153.0546°E)
- Beaudesert Road Park (27.6271°S 153.0457°E)
- Borage Place Park (27.6287°S 153.0503°E)
- Bundabah Drive Park (27.6167°S 153.0384°E)
- Bundabah Drive Park (no.55) (27.6146°S 153.0402°E)
- Calamvale District Park (27.6212°S 153.0391°E)
- Calamvista Park (27.6171°S 153.0591°E)
- Caravonica Court Park (27.6153°S 153.0567°E)
- Clembury Place Park (27.6229°S 153.0357°E)
- Corypha Crescent Park (27.6231°S 153.0582°E)
- Currajong Street Park (27.6175°S 153.0527°E)
- Cyril Sims Park (27.6138°S 153.0600°E)
- Doulton Street Park (27.6372°S 153.0484°E)
- Eden Elm Street Park (27.6196°S 153.0546°E)
- Formby Street (no. 49) Park (27.6213°S 153.0358°E)
- Gowan Road Park (27.6291°S 153.0568°E)
- Hamish Street Park (27.6189°S 153.0441°E)
- Highlands Drive Park (27.6109°S 153.0466°E)
- Honeysuckle Way Park (27.6332°S 153.0537°E)
- Illaweena Street Park (no.154) (27.6381°S 153.0524°E)
- Juxgold Place Park (27.6260°S 153.0552°E)
- Monford Place Park (27.6163°S 153.0541°E)
- Nottingham Road Park (no.233) (27.6273°S 153.0330°E)
- Ormskirk Street Park (27.6202°S 153.0434°E)
- Parkland Street Park (27.6215°S 153.0545°E)
- Peden Court Park (27.6182°S 153.0473°E)
- Perkins Street Park (lot 403) (27.6210°S 153.0468°E)
- Riverina Street Park (27.6147°S 153.0483°E)
- Stevenson Street Park (27.6159°S 153.0463°E)
- Sunflower Crescent Park (27.6317°S 153.0533°E)
- Tristania Close Park (27.6196°S 153.0578°E)
- Tuberose Place Park (27.6355°S 153.0567°E)
- Woodlark Crescent Park (27.6317°S 153.0444°E)
- Yewleaf Place Park (27.6205°S 153.0594°E)

== Sporting ==
The Calamvale Leopards are the local junior Australian rules football team.

== Transport ==
No train stations are in Calamvale, although Altandi and Runcorn train stations are only about a five-minute drive away. Travel to the Brisbane CBD is roughly 30 minutes (off-peak) by car, 40–55 minutes by bus, and 30–45 minutes by train from Runcorn and Altandi railway stations.

Calamvale is serviced by nine bus routes operated by Transport for Brisbane and Park Ridge Transit, as listed below. It is in Zone 2 of the Translink zoning scheme.

== Golden Pond wetlands ==
An eco-friendly feature of Calamvale is the Golden Pond Wetlands attached to Calamvale Creek.

A natural creek (part of a longer channel known as Scrubby Creek, but locally known as Calamvale Creek) and a riparian wetland run through the lower part of Calamvale. In the late 1990s, two constructed wetlands relying on storm water runoff were built upstream of the creek on each side of Golden Avenue. They are known as the Golden Pond wetlands.

The wetlands and creek, collectively called the Golden Pond wetland system, provide a small wildfowl habitat and a storm water treatment train designed to improve the quality of storm water runoff as it progresses down the creek.

=== Treatment train ===
The treatment train is made up of several parts, and purifies water as it flows through each part.

An upstream storm water drainage channel runs into a sediment basin, which collects the heaviest sediments and allows better-quality water to flow into Wetland 1. Water flows through a gross pollutant trap into Wetland 2, which was originally a small farm dam on the south side of the Golden Avenue road bridge. Overflow water from Wetland 2 runs into a natural riparian wetland fringed with melaleucas, and this runs into a natural creek with small lagoons.

=== Wildlife ===
The Calamvale wetlands and creek provide a home and a retreat for ducks, egrets, cormorants, spoonbills, herons, water dragons, turtles, eels, and a large number of other wildfowl and animals.

=== Water quality ===
Environmental engineers from Brisbane's Griffith University have conducted numerous studies on water quality at the creek and wetlands, and have presented papers at conferences internationally on the design and effectiveness of the treatment train.

== Notable people ==
Actor Russell Dykstra grew up in the suburb, frequently entertaining commuters on the local 141 bus with his self-styled pantomimes while taking the long commute into St Laurence's College in South Brisbane as a schoolboy from 1979 to 1981.
