= Henry Parkinson (railway engineer) =

Australian railway engineer (died 1942)

Henry Waterworth Parkinson (died 1942) was a railway engineer in Australia and New Zealand.

Parkinson was a civil engineer who worked in New Zealand and New South Wales before coming to Queensland and joining the Queensland Railways Department. He supervised the erection of the now heritage-listed Burdekin River Rail Bridge at Macrossan (now Dotswood). Subsequently, he was the engineer for the section of the North Coast railway line from Paget Junction to Sarina and for the section of the Tablelands railway line from Atherton to Herberton. From 1913 he was engineer for the City of Rockhampton.

Parkinson died in Sydney aged 85 years.

The suburb of Parkinson in Brisbane was named after him in 1972.
