= Harry Parkinson (cricketer) =

Australian cricketer

Personal information
- Born: 10 June 1882; Port Arthur, Tasmania, Australia
- Died: 25 December 1955 (aged 73); Sydney, Australia

Domestic team information
- Years: Team
- 1908-1914: Tasmania
- Source: Cricinfo, 19 January 2016

Harry Parkinson (10 June 1882 – 25 December 1955) was an Australian cricketer. He played six first-class matches for Tasmania between 1908 and 1914.

== See also ==
- List of Tasmanian representative cricketers
