= James Martin (Queensland politician) =

Australian politician

James Martin MP

Member of the Queensland Legislative Assembly for Stretton
- Incumbent
- Assumed office 24 July 2021
- Preceded by: Duncan Pegg

Personal details
- Born: 20 April 1981 (age 45)
- Party: Labor
- Education: University of Queensland; Griffith University
- Occupation: Electorate officer, industrial advocate and union organiser

James Robert Martin (born 20 April 1981) is an Australian politician who currently serves as the Labor member for Stretton in the Queensland Legislative Assembly, having been elected at the 2021 Stretton state by-election on 24 July 2021.

Martin replaced Duncan Pegg, who died of cancer in June 2021. Prior to his election, Martin had worked as an electorate officer for Pegg from 2015 until Pegg's death. He had previously contested Calamvale Ward at the local government elections for Brisbane City Council in 2020, achieving an 11.4% primary swing towards Labor but was not elected. He holds a bachelor's degree from Griffith University and a master's degree from University of Queensland.

Parliament of Queensland
Preceded by Duncan Pegg	Member for Stretton; 2021–present	Incumbent
