= Electoral district of Stretton =

State electoral district of Queensland, Australia

Stretton Queensland—Legislative Assembly
- Electoral map of Stretton 2017
- State: Queensland
- MP: James Martin
- Party: Labor
- Namesake: Stretton
- Electors: 33,961 (2021)
- Area: 41 km^{2} (15.8 sq mi)
- Demographic: Outer-metropolitan
- Coordinates: 27°37′S 153°4′E
Electorates around Stretton:
Algester	Toohey	Waterford
Algester	Stretton	Woodridge
Algester	Woodridge	Woodridge

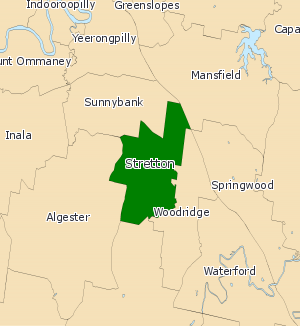
Electoral map of Stretton 2008

Stretton is an electoral district of the Legislative Assembly in the Australian state of Queensland.

The district is based in the southern suburbs of Brisbane. It is named for the suburb of Stretton and also includes the suburbs of Calamvale, Eight Mile Plains, Kuraby, Sunnybank Hills and Underwood. It was first contested at the 2001 state election.

== Members for Stretton ==
Member	Party	Term
Stephen Robertson	Labor	2001–2012
Freya Ostapovitch	Liberal National	2012–2015
Duncan Pegg	Labor	2015–2021
James Martin	Labor	2021–present

== Election results ==
2024 Queensland state election: Stretton
Party	Candidate	Votes	%	±%
Labor	James Martin	13,347	45.58	−11.02
Liberal National	Freya Ostapovitch	9,952	33.99	+3.79
Greens	Ahmed Abdulhamed	4,154	14.19	+5.49
One Nation	Stephen Strong	1,094	3.73	−0.77
Family First	Merle Totenhofer	735	2.51	+2.51
Total formal votes		29,282	95.37	
Informal votes		1,421	4.63	
Turnout		30,703	88.75	
Two-party-preferred result
Labor	James Martin	17,434	59.54	−5.26
Liberal National	Freya Ostapovitch	11,848	40.46	+5.26
Labor hold		Swing	–5.26	

Primary vote results in Stretton (Parties that have never gotten 5% of the vote are omitted)
Labor
Liberal/Liberal National
Greens
One Nation
Independent
View source data.
Two-party-preferred vote vote results in Stretton View source data.
