= Duncan Pegg =

Australian politician (1980–2021)

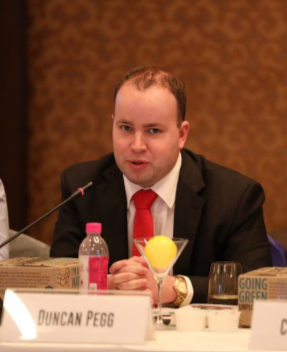

Member of the Queensland Legislative Assembly for Stretton
- In office 31 January 2015 – 10 June 2021
- Preceded by: Freya Ostapovitch
- Succeeded by: James Martin

Personal details
- Born: 27 June 1980 Townsville, Queensland, Australia
- Died: 10 June 2021 (aged 40)
- Party: Labor (1998–2021)
- Education: Griffith University; Queensland University of Technology
- Profession: Lawyer; Politician

Duncan Andrew Pegg (27 June 1980 – 10 June 2021) was an Australian politician. He was the Labor member for Stretton in the Queensland Legislative Assembly from the 2015 election until his death in 2021. On 22 April 2021, Pegg announced he would be resigning within several weeks to undergo treatment for cancer. Pegg's death triggered a by-election for Stretton.

== Early life ==
Pegg was born in Townsville, Queensland. He was the eldest in a family of five boys, including a set of triplets. He was raised and attended high school in Rockhampton, Queensland.

Compelled by his objection to the rise of Pauline Hanson's One Nation, he joined the Australian Labor Party at the age of 17 in 1998.

He graduated from Griffith University with law and commerce degrees. majoring in politics. Pegg was then employed as an articled clerk at Sciaccas Lawyers before working as a lawyer for the National Union of Workers.

== Parliamentary career ==
Pegg was first elected at the 2015 election, defeating incumbent Freya Ostapovitch on a swing of over 14%. Ostapovitch had won the previously safe seat from Labor during the Liberal National Party of Queensland landslide of the 2012 election. In the subsequent 2017 and 2020 elections, Pegg increased the margin of Stretton back into safe territory for Labor, winning 64.8% of the two-party preferred vote in 2020.

During his time as a member of the Queensland Legislative Assembly, Pegg served as a member of various committees including as Deputy Chair of the Parliamentary Crime and Corruption Committee, Chair of the State Development, Tourism, Innovation and Manufacturing Committee, Chair of the Legal Affairs and Community Safety Committee, Chair of the Agriculture and Environment Committee and as a Member of the Ethics Committee.

In 2017, Pegg was awarded the Queensland Public Service Award by the Queensland Intercultural Society.

On 4 June 2021, Stretton State College named its performing arts building the Duncan Pegg Performing Arts Centre in recognition of Pegg's support for the school's arts and instrumental music programs.

Pegg was diagnosed with cancer in 2019. He died at age 40 on 10 June 2021, seven weeks after he announced he was retiring from politics to focus on his health.

Parliament of Queensland
Preceded by Freya Ostapovitch	Member for Stretton; 2015–2021	Succeeded by James Martin
