= Freya Ostapovitch =

Australian politician

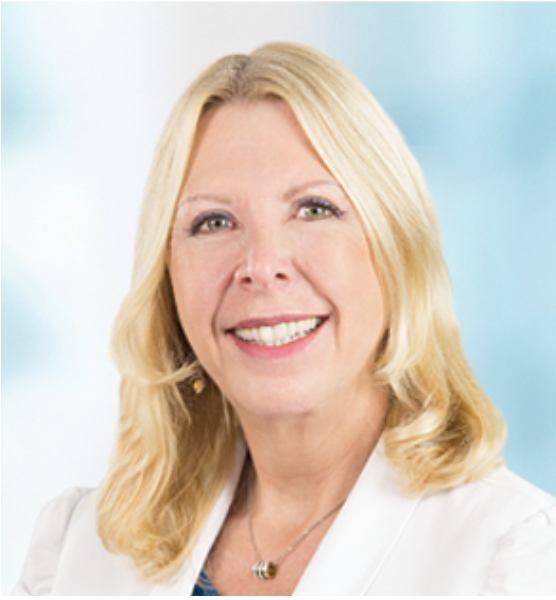

Member of the Queensland Parliament for Stretton
- In office 24 March 2012 – 31 January 2015
- Preceded by: Stephen Robertson
- Succeeded by: Duncan Pegg

Personal details
- Born: 24 February 1956 (age 70) Kerkrade, Netherlands
- Party: Liberal National

Freya Ostapovitch (born 24 February 1956) is an Australian Liberal National politician who was the member of the Legislative Assembly of Queensland for Stretton from 2012 to 2015.

Ostapovitch was a candidate representing the Liberal National Party at the 2016 federal election for the seat of Rankin. She has claimed that abortions increase the risk of breast cancer.

Ostapovitch caused controversy on 18 June 2014 when she was filmed throwing objects aggressively at peaceful media.

== Electoral History ==
Queensland Legislative Assembly
Election year	Electorate	Party	Votes	FP%	+/-	2PP%	+/-	Result
2012	Stretton	LNP	13,000	46.85	▲9.75	59.55	▲19.03	First
2015	Stretton	LNP	10,884	37.93	▼8.92	45.02	▼14.54	Second
2017	Stretton	LNP	7,884	28.40	▼9.90	40.10	▼4.60	Second
2024	Stretton	LNP	9,952	33.99	▲3.79	40.46	▲5.26	Second

Australian House of Representatives
Election year	Electorate	Party	Votes	FP%	+/-	2PP%	+/-	Result
2016	Rankin	LNP	24,455	28.63	▼7.74	38.70	▼6.52	Second

Parliament of Queensland
Preceded by Stephen Robertson	Member for Stretton; 2012–2015	Succeeded by Duncan Pegg
