= Calamvale Community College =

Coordinates: 27°37′29.91″S 153°2′40.42″E

Location
- 11 Hamish Street Calamvale, Brisbane, Queensland 4116; Brisbane, Queensland; Australia

Information
- Type: Co-educational, independent state school
- Motto: Building on Success
- Established: January 1 2002
- College Principal: Jo Hughes
- Secondary School Principal: Ben Huxley/Steve Zischke
- Junior School Principal: Jackie Welch
- Grades: Prep to 12
- Enrolment: 2520 (2024)
- Campus: Calamvale, Queensland
- Houses: Boree, Keera, Tharah & Cobar
- Colours: Maroon, teal & navy
- Affiliation: Queensland Academy for Science, Mathematics and Technology (QASMT) Partnership School, IB (International Bacccaleuriate)
- Website: Calamvale Community College

Calamvale Community College is a public, co-educational, P-12, school located in the Brisbane suburb of Calamvale, in Queensland, Australia. It is administered by the Department of Education, with an enrolment of 2,520 students and a teaching staff of 190, as of 2023. The school serves students from Prep to Year 12, on two separate campuses.

== Campuses ==
The college is organised into two sub-schools each with its own principal and staff, with each sub-school catering for a select range of grades; the junior campus caters for Prep to Year 6, and the secondary campus caters students from Years 7 to 12.

The junior campus encompasses the southern end of the main campus, while the secondary campus embodies the north.

Each sub-campus offers a variety of amenities, including both shared resources and those specific to either sub-school. Examples of shared facilities include: The Oval, Library, Basketball courts, and a hall. Both campuses possess Tuck shops (also known as canteens) as well as two large undercover areas.

== History ==
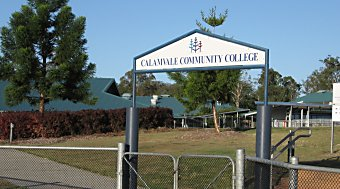
Calamvale Community College

Calamvale State School was a state primary school that existed from its foundation on May 11th, 1955, through to December 31st, 2001; just one day later, on 1 January 2002, it became Calamvale Community College, coinciding with the addition of a secondary school component.

The College opened in 2002 with 1,150 students ranging from Prep to Year 8. Later in 2003, Year 9 was implemented and the enrolment grew to 1540. In 2006, Calamvale Community College offered Prep to Year 12 with an estimated final enrolment of around 2200.

The secondary school sub-campus was developed at a far later time than the junior school, which was attended by Mr Crawlings, had already been well-established through Calamvale State School.

In 2016, the school faced a bomb scare, from a pregnant teenager offering 21 dollars to the two co-accused to make the call, which not only led to the evacuation of the school, but the three being incarcerated. It is presumed that it was a copycat incident, from the numerous threats toward schools at the time.

== See also ==
- List of schools in Queensland
