= Fachwerk Farmhouse =

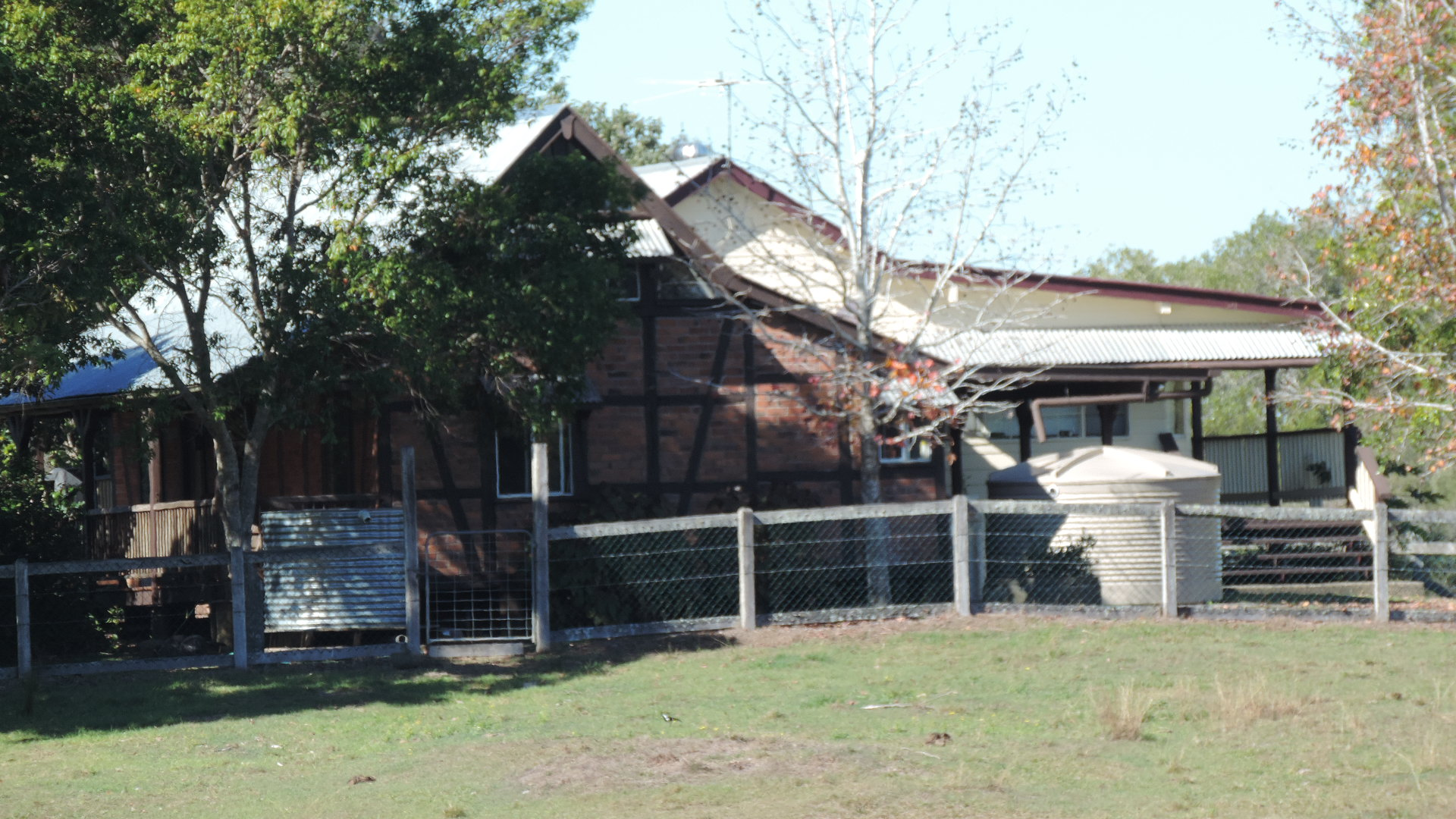
- Fachwerk Farmhouse, 2014

- Location within Queensland Location within Australia
- 27.6797°S 153.2285°E
- Location: 445–469 Beenleigh Redland Bay Rd, Carbrook, City of Logan, Queensland, Australia

History
- Design period: 1870s–1890s (late 19th century)
- Built: c. 1873
- Built for: Christian Kruger

Queensland Heritage Register
- Official name: Fachwerk Farmhouse, Krugers Farm
- Type: state heritage (archaeological, built)
- Designated: 7 February 2005
- Reference no.: 601647
- Significant period: 1870s (fabric); 1860s–1970s (historical)
- Significant components: dam/reservoir, garden/grounds, trees/plantings, farmhouse
- Builders: August Von Senden

Fachwerk Farmhouse is a heritage-listed farmhouse at 445–469 Beenleigh Redland Bay Rd, Carbrook, City of Logan, Queensland, Australia. It was built c. 1873 by August Von Senden. It is also known as Krugers Farm. It was added to the Queensland Heritage Register on 7 February 2005.

== History ==
The brick and timber farmhouse was erected beside the Logan River in the early 1870s for immigrant German farmer Christian Kruger and his family. It was built using construction methods and materials traditional to rural northern Germany, from where the majority of settlers along the Logan River in the middle of the 19th century emigrated.

The farm is located on the former Logan River Agricultural Reserve. The creation of agricultural reserves was one of the Queensland Government's earliest initiatives following separation from New South Wales in December 1859. Expanding agricultural production within Queensland's pastoral-based economy was necessary to reduce the colony's dependence on imported foodstuffs, and to encourage cash cropping of export commodities such as cotton and sugar. The Alienation of Crown Lands Act of 1860 incorporated provision for the government to create agricultural reserves on which good arable land was to be sold cheaply at the fixed price of £1 per acre. In the same year, an area of approximately 20,000 acres (8,100 ha) along the lower reaches of the Logan River 17 miles (27 km) southeast of Brisbane was surveyed into farm portions. On 2 January 1861 this area was proclaimed the Logan River Agricultural Reserve, with the first sale of land on the reserve held in Brisbane on 2 April 1862. Extensions to the reserve totalling 33,000 acres (13,000 ha) were proclaimed in 1863 and 1864. The land that Christian Kruger later acquired was part of the second extension to the Logan River Agricultural Reserve. It was surveyed in 1865 and first offered for sale on 19 April 1866, but was not alienated at the time.

Another priority closely linked to the expansion of agriculture was the promotion of immigration to Queensland, to alleviate severe labour and skills shortages, expand the amount of land under cultivation, and create a local market for Queensland produce. To encourage the expansion of agriculture, amendments were made in 1861 to the Alienation of Crown Lands Act of 1860, whereby a system of land orders was introduced as an incentive to immigrants. This system was incorporated into the Immigration Act of 1864, and entitled immigrants from steerage or intermediate class who had paid their full passage to the receipt of non-transferable land orders. These land orders could be exchanged for any country or suburban land offered for sale by auction or selection to the value of the land orders issued. Assisted passages were offered to labourers and mechanics, but these persons usually did not receive land orders from 1864. Immigrants from England, Ireland and Scotland were the targeted group, but the Act also provided for emigration from Germany at the rate of no more than 2,000 adults per annum. In the 20 years (1861–81) that the land order system operated in Queensland, 9,514 German immigrants arrived on 45 voyages.

The first wave of German immigrants brought to Queensland under the auspices of immigration agent Johann Christian Heussler (appointed in 1861) and the Godeffroy & Son shipping company arrived in 1864 and settled at Bethania on the Logan River, where they were among the first to take up agricultural land. Large numbers of German immigrants followed them to the area, settling around Bethania, Beenleigh, Yatala, Eagleby (formerly Philadelphia), Alberton, Carbrook (formerly Gramzow), Stapylton (formerly Yellow Wood) and Pimpama. In the 1871 census, 20% of the Logan-Albert district population was German born (compared with 7% for the whole of Queensland), and the percentage was much higher on the Logan River Agricultural Reserve, which was populated predominantly by German immigrant families. As late as 1898, the Logan River area with its German population was referred to by the English community as "Germany", with Australian-born children of immigrant parents still speaking low German, or deutsch plat, possibly as their principal language. By 1898 the district had 7 Lutheran churches which nurtured and facilitated German culture on the Logan reserve. Until well into the 20th century, church services were conducted in German and German language schools operated at several of the Logan churches.

Christian Kruger and his wife Wilhelmine and two children arrived at Moreton Bay on the Suzanne Goddefroy on 6 September 1865. This was the peak year for German immigration to Queensland, with 2,830 immigrants arriving in 12 ships. Most of these immigrants were attracted by the opportunity to acquire cheap farmland in Queensland - very few appear to have emigrated for religious or political reasons at this period. For the first two years the Kruger family resided at Bethania, where Christian worked as a farm labourer in the closely knit German community. In 1867 he selected portion 203, parish of Mackenzie, a parcel of 31 acres (13 ha) on the north side of the Logan River at Gramzow, some miles downstream from Bethania. Gramzow was named after the small town of Gramzow in the Uckermark region of Prussia (north Germany), from where large numbers of the early Logan settlers had emigrated in 1864–65. It was renamed Carbrook in 1916 during World War I, when anti-German sentiment was high.

The Kruger family may have been assisted immigrants not eligible for land orders, because there is no record of them having received government land orders, and Christian made application for the Gramzow selection on 23 August 1867 under the conditions of the Leasing Act of 1866. This Act enabled any Crown land offered for sale by auction or selection and not sold within 30 days, to be opened for lease. The term of the lease was eight years, and the land would be granted to the lessee as freehold following the final year's payment. Christian Kruger was able to pay off his lease some years in advance, and acquired the freehold to portion 203 on 31 December 1872.

Like most of the German settlers on the Logan River reserve, the Krugers erected a slab and bark hut as their first dwelling, and concentrated on clearing the scrub, fencing the land and planting their first crop, which probably was maize. Within a few years the farm had proved viable, and the family was able to erect a larger and more substantial residence. According to a local tradition, the present farmhouse was built in 1871, the year Mrs Auguste Ernestine Kruger (née Raedel), Christian's daughter-in-law, was born. However, it is also possible the house was built c. 1873, after Christian Kruger acquired title to the land.

The Krugers constructed their farmhouse in the half-timbering or fachwerk method similar to the mid-19th century German farmhouses erected in South Australia (at Hahndorf, Paechtown, Lobethal, the Barossa Valley, etc.), and traditional to north German rural communities. Fachwerk, meaning shelf-work, involved the raising of an interlocking timber frame that was then infilled with masonry such as brick-nogging or wattle and daub. The latter was often rendered. Similarly constructed buildings identified in the Logan River district include:

- the first St Paul's Lutheran Church at Gramzow erected in 1875 under the supervision of August von Senden, a Gramzow-Mount Cotton resident
- the first Lutheran manse at Bethania erected by 1884
- the Holzheimer farmhouse at Bethania, erected by c. 1872
- the Schneider home at Waterford, which also operated as the Waterford Post Office
- M Schneider's blacksmith shop at Waterford

Apart from the farmhouse at the former Kruger's farm, none of these buildings survive. The Bethania Lutheran Church and the Eagleby Lutheran Church were constructed of brick, but not in the half-timbered fashion.

Fachwerk buildings were not unusual on the Logan River Agricultural Reserve, but neither were they common. If an early farmhouse of slab construction was replaced by a more substantial house during the 1860s or 1870s, half-timbering was an option. By the 1880s, however, it would appear that the early homes were being replaced with standard Queensland timber and corrugated galvanised iron residences. The reason as to why fachwerk was no longer practised has yet to be established. The construction of fachwerk houses required the services of a highly skilled craftsman due to the complexity of the jointing and assembly of the structural timber frame.

August von Senden may have been the master carpenter who constructed the frame for the Kruger's and supervised its erection. Von Senden was a neighbour of Christian Kruger, and was resident on the Logan River Agricultural Reserve from at least September 1869, when he made application to select portion 208, parish of Mackenzie. In partnership with E Schroeder he later held portions 200 and 201, and from 1873 leased a substantial land holding at Mt Cotton as well as his Gramzow farms. Von Senden supervised the erection of the frame for St Paul's at Gramzow, and although clearly a farmer - with interests in a sugar mill at Mount Cotton as well - is listed in the 1889 Queensland Post Office Directory as a carpenter.

The timber frame (walls, floor and roof) of the Fachwerk Farmhouse appears to have been cut and dressed off site, with each section clearly marked with Roman numerals or other identifying marks. The Kruger family believes the frame, with the exception of the verandahs, was then assembled and raised by 14 men in one day. It was then infilled with hand-made bricks which reputedly came from Eagleby, on the other side of the Logan River. The roof was shingled originally, unlike the thatched roofs of the South Australian fachwerk buildings. Also unlike the South Australian buildings, which usually rested on a stone plinth, the Gramzow house is elevated on timber stumps. This standard method utilized in most Queensland timber buildings is also a feature of some German fachwerk houses, especially those located on flood plains. Von Senden was a native of Holstein where it was common practice for buildings erected in swampy areas and on low-lying islands to be raised on piers.

The farmhouse originally had a separate kitchen and smokehouse. A kitchen alcove was added to the original building around the end of the 19th century. The farmhouse survived the great flood of January 1887, despite water rising several feet inside. By 1888, Kruger's farm was concentrating on sugar production, one of the staple crops in the Logan-Albert district until the collapse of the sugar industry after the turn of the century, and the family had an interest in a sugar mill on an adjacent property.

Christian Friedrich Wilhelm Kruger, who in 1865 at the age of 10 had emigrated to the Logan with his parents Christian and Wilhelmine, married in 1891 and raised 13 children on the farm. Title to the farm had passed to him in 1886, although his parents continued to reside there until their deaths in 1905, within 5 months of each other. CFW Kruger died in 1928, but his widow Auguste Ernestine Raedel remained at Kruger's farm until her death at the age of nearly 100 in 1970. Title to the farm passed out of the Kruger family in 1978.

== Description ==
A 12-hectare property on the northern bank of the Logan River at Carbrook, the former Kruger's Farm is situated in a rural residential area at the intersection of the Beenleigh-Redland Bay Road and Skinners Road. Skinners Road, a continuation of the Mount Cotton Road, joins Skinners Park, a former wharf reserve on the Logan River, to form the western boundary of the farm. Other rural residential properties adjoin the eastern boundary of the farm.

The entrance to the property is via the northern frontage that faces the Beenleigh-Redland Bay Road. An extended driveway leads from the northeast corner, through grazing paddocks, past a cluster of timber sheds, to the original brick and timber farmhouse. Other structures on the property include a substantial extension to the farmhouse, a modern garage, stockyards and a dam. The extension and the garage are not significant.

The Fachwerk Farmhouse is located adjacent to the dam, towards the eastern side of the property and somewhat closer to the river frontage than the road frontage. An elevated timber framed brick cottage with a corrugated iron gable roof, it is a simple rectangular planned building with skillion-roofed verandahs on the longer north and south elevations. Consisting of a main level and an attic built under the steeply pitched roof, the house has been constructed using the traditional German building method known as fachwerk.

Fachwerk is a type of half-timbering consisting of the erection of a timber structural frame, the walls of which are then infilled with non-structural masonry panels. In this case the infill is face brickwork. The framing, reputed to be grey ironbark, is generally square in section, hand cut and assembled off site prior to the final erection. Roman numerals and runes are inscribed in the timber to identify the position of each structural member. Joints, including cross-halved, checked and mortise and tenon, interlock the timber members giving the frame greater structural rigidity. Each member must be placed into position in the correct sequence during erection due to the complexity of the jointing system. Round timber pegs are used to position and hold joints, instead of nails. Some of these timber pegs are visible, cut flush with the face of the posts.

The timber frame is clearly visible on the exterior of the building and throughout most of the interior. Short timber stumps support sturdy horizontal bottom plates positioned in line with the floor joists. The bottom plates on the eastern and western ends extend to form the framing for the verandah floors. Timber posts mounted on the bottom plate, are positioned at regular intervals dividing the wall into panels. Horizontal top plates, positioned in line with the floor joists of the attic on the east and west walls and directly under the floor joists on the north and south walls, rest on the top of the posts. Between each post are two rows of timber nogging, dividing the panels equally except where windows, mostly timber casements, are incorporated. Diagonal cross bracing, half-checked where it meets the horizontal nogging, is used externally in the wall panels adjacent to the corners of the building. Panels of interior wall that meet the perimeter walls are also cross-braced. In the gable end walls, shorter posts of various heights are positioned between the top plate and the rafters. The timber frame was originally finished with a stain, possibly of ox blood, but has since been painted.

Brick infill panels in stretcher bond fit snugly into the spaces between the timber wall members. This kind of brickwork is known as backfilling or brick nogging. The heights between the horizontal timber members are sized to suit brick dimensions. The original bricks are soft handmade bricks, reddish brown in colour and laid with a lime mortar.

The farmhouse has a simple gable roof, clad in corrugated iron. The roof structure consists of a series of timber rafters supported on a central ridge beam and the perimeter walls. Timber posts, positioned over the lower level internal walls, break the span of the ridge beam. A timber bracket on one side of the post further reduces the central span. Roofs over the verandahs are a continuation of the gable roof of the house but with a shallower pitch.

The north verandah has a timber floor, timber stairs and exposed timber framing, including timber posts with decorative brackets supporting the verandah beam. Brick stairs of recent construction have been built on the eastern end of the verandah. A panelled timber door in the centre of the north elevation opens into the living room of the farmhouse. The north verandah overlooks a lawn and garden which are fenced off from the surrounding paddocks. The remains of a once large fig tree, which has resprouted, is located just in front of this verandah.

The south verandah has been built in and a skillion-roofed patio with a concrete floor has been added. The south west corner of the verandah, enclosed with a similar type of construction to the main house, now houses a bathroom. The remainder of the verandah is enclosed by aluminium sliding doors. The eastern end of the south verandah opens into the recent extension to the original farmhouse.

The Fachwerk Farmhouse contains three rooms on the ground level, a central living room and two side rooms accessed from the central room. The floors are timber, covered with carpet and interior walls are rendered and painted. The timber frame is visible in the north and south walls and the internal dividing walls but the east and west walls have been re-plastered, concealing the timber framing. The original ceiling has been removed and a new timber attic floor now forms the ceiling over the ground level rooms, exposing the original timber ceiling joists.

A steep stair provides access from the south verandah to the attic. This stair has been added and the attic was probably originally reached via an external ladder. The attic ceiling has been lined with sheeting and the rafters are only partly visible. No original furniture remains in the farmhouse.

Some of the original fabric of the house was altered when renovations were carried out in the 1980s. The brickwork on the eastern and western walls, damaged in an earlier storm, was replaced with modern bricks and cement mortar. The brickwork in the gable at the western end of the building was replaced with glass installed between the original timber members. Windows in the eastern and western walls have been replaced with aluminium-framed windows and new awnings have been constructed over these windows.

Other structures that remain on the farm include three timber sheds located on either side of the entry driveway and timber cattle yards positioned to the east of the driveway. The sheds are all in very poor condition due to the effects of termites and weathering. Further investigation of the site might reveal remnants of earlier buildings such as a smoke house and kitchen, thought to have been built on the site of the new extension, a brick making facility in or near the dam and the remains of a pit saw and wharf in the adjoining park.

The site has only a few large trees, except for the riverbank which is thickly vegetated with established mangroves.

== Heritage listing ==
The Fachwerk Farmhouse was listed on the Queensland Heritage Register on 7 February 2005 having satisfied the following criteria.

The place is important in demonstrating the evolution or pattern of Queensland's history.

Influenced by the prevailing land order system and the appointment of German-born immigration agents, 1861 to 1881 was the period of large-scale German immigration to Queensland. Little physical evidence survives of the close-knit communities these immigrants established along the Logan River and the farmhouse is a visible reminder of an important pattern of migration to Queensland during the second half of the 19th century. One of the oldest buildings remaining in the Logan district, the farmhouse also provides evidence of the early settlement of the Logan River Agricultural Reserve.

The place demonstrates rare, uncommon or endangered aspects of Queensland's cultural heritage.

The farmhouse is extremely rare as the only known surviving example of fachwerk in Queensland.

Constructed in the early 1870s by immigrant German farmers using a traditional building technique, the Fachwerk Farmhouse at Carbrook is significant as rare surviving evidence of the transplantation of north German culture, language and tradition to Queensland during the formative post-Separation years.

The place has potential to yield information that will contribute to an understanding of Queensland's history.

The Fachwerk Farmhouse is significant for its potential to reveal information about traditional north German construction techniques, especially from the Uckermark area of Germany, brought to Queensland in the mid-19th century. Further study of the place may also reveal other structures and archaeological remains that could contribute to our understanding of a way of life no longer practiced in Queensland.

The place is important in demonstrating the principal characteristics of a particular class of cultural places.

A distinctive timber and masonry building method, fachwerk requires a master craftsman to fashion and erect a jointed timber frame. The farmhouse is substantially intact and demonstrates the principal characteristics of a fachwerkbau, or traditional north German half-timbered building.

The place has a special association with the life or work of a particular person, group or organisation of importance in Queensland's history.

Due to its unique appearance and the loss of other similar buildings, the place has a special association with early German immigrants who played an important role in the settlement of Queensland and whose descendants still live in the area.
