= Old Carbrook State School =

Former state school in Queensland, Australia

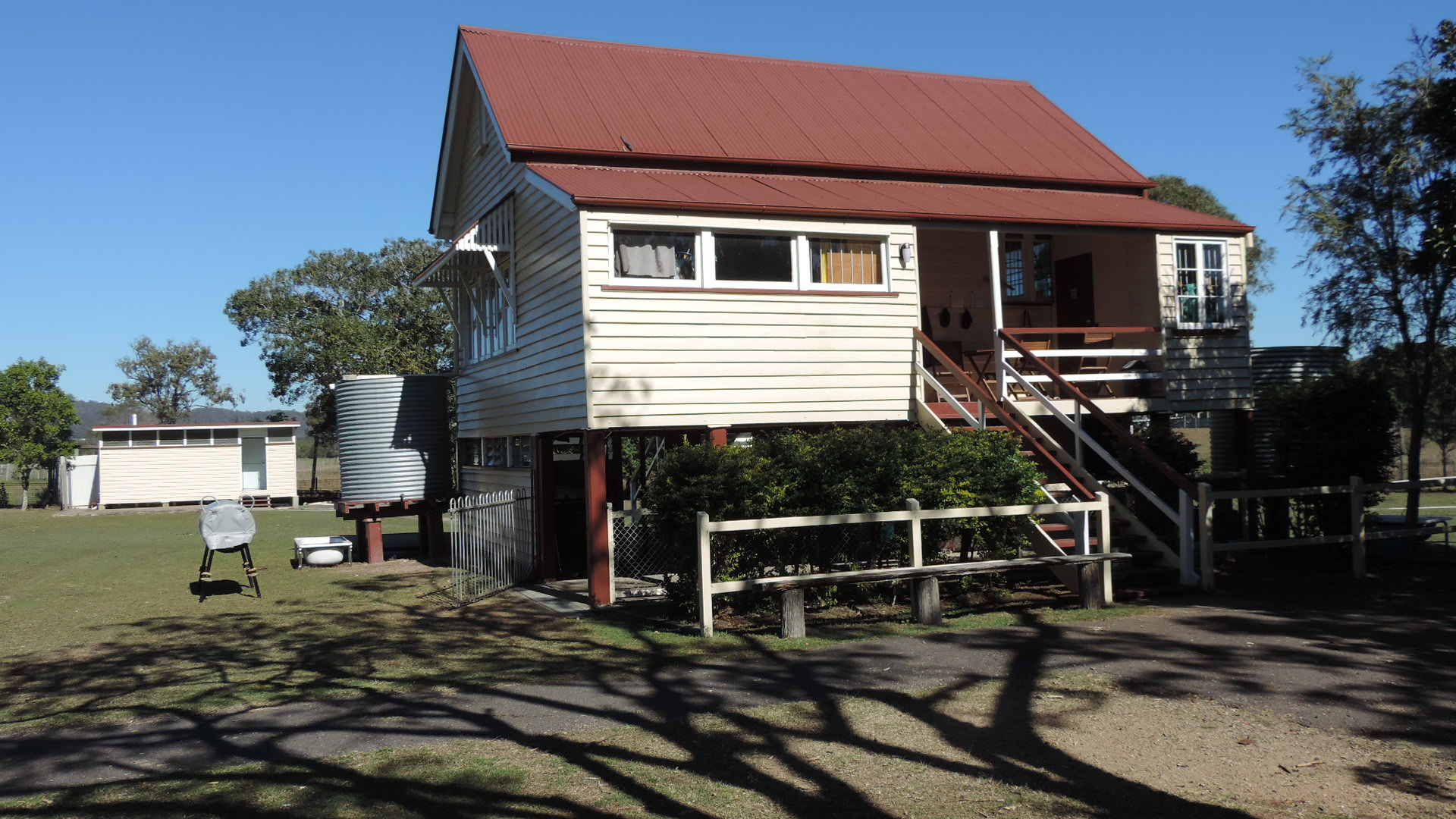
- Carbrook State School, 2014

- Location within Queensland Location within Australia
- 27.6792°S 153.2424°E
- Location: 597–605 Beenleigh–Redland Bay Road, Carbrook, City of Logan, Queensland, Australia

History
- Design period: 1870s–1890s (late 19th century)
- Built: 1877–1977

Site notes
- Architectural style: Classicism

Queensland Heritage Register
- Official name: Carbrook State School (former), Gramzow Provisional School
- Type: state heritage (built)
- Designated: 21 October 1992
- Reference no.: 600661
- Significant period: 1870s–1880s (historical); 1870s–1980s (social); 1870s–1920s (fabric)
- Significant components: school/school room

Old Carbrook State School is a heritage-listed former state school at 597–605 Beenleigh–Redland Bay Road, Carbrook, City of Logan, Queensland, Australia. It was built from 1877 to 1977. It is also known as Gramzow Provisional School. It was added to the Queensland Heritage Register on 21 October 1992.

== History ==
The former Carbrook State School, now a high-set timber and iron building, was originally named Gramzow Provisional School when constructed in 1877.

The area around Carbrook was originally called the Logan District after Captain Patrick Logan who discovered the Logan River in 1826. The area was logged by timber getters before selectors began arriving in the 1860s. The first selector in the area was Herman Meissner who took up his selection in April 1868. The mainly German immigrants who settled in the Carbrook area named the settlement Gramzow after the town Gramzow in Germany, and followed agricultural pursuits including the growing and milling of sugar cane and arrowroot. Later, the area supported dairying which gave way to bananas and a variety of small crops.

In 1876, farmers John Sommer, Charles Habermann, August Fischer and James Graham, formed a committee representing the community and requested the Department of Public Instruction to establish a State School at Gramzow. The request was refused as there were insufficient student numbers to justify the establishment of a State School, but the department suggested that the best way will be to begin with a Provisional School at Gramzow, and when the attendance exceeds thirty, a residence can be added. A Provisional School was described as being one in which temporary provision is made for the primary instruction of children and not being a State school. These schools were established where an average attendance of between 12 and 30 pupils could be maintained and where the local promoters could provide a suitable building at their own expense. These buildings could be built on private land, Crown land or on land vested in the Minister. When the average attendance of the school rose to more than 30, the school committee was expected to raise the requisite one-fifth local contribution towards the cost of a State school.

In March 1876, farmers August Fischer and Herman Meissner each sold two acres of land, creating a four-acre school site, to the Department of Public Instruction for the nominal price of five shillings each (registered in May 1876). The land had been alienated from the crown in 1868, with Fischer obtaining 38 acres (15 ha) and Meissner obtaining 50 acres (20 ha). Tenders for construction were called in March 1877. The school building cost £174, with the residents subscribing £70 (£50 cash and £20 value of the land), and the Gramzow Provisional School opened on 5 November 1877 with 23 pupils enrolled in the December quarter. Tenders were called for the teacher's residence in August 1878. The teacher's residence was completed on 17 January 1879 (no longer extant), the school became a State School on 20 January 1879, and was first inspected on 7 June 1879 at which time there were 33 pupils enrolled.

=== The school ===
The school building was built on low timber stumps with a timber shingled roof, unlined weatherboard walls and without a verandah. The building was set back from the road towards the rear of the lightly timbered site, as this was the highest position within the low-lying land, which was described as being very flat and boggy in wet weather.

A verandah was added to the north side of the school building in 1889, with either end enclosed as a hat room and lavatory. The first Arbor Day was held in 1892, and between 1892 and 1896 a gateway was erected and later, driveway trees were planted. In 1908 the school building was roofed with corrugated iron.

Children of German families from Gramzow walked to Alberton (formerly Elkana) every Thursday to attend the German School to learn German. The school was located near St Peter's Lutheran Church where services were conducted in German until the First World War. In 1916 Gramzow was changed to Carbrook, and in November of that year the Department of Public Instruction approved the change of name of the school to Carbrook State School. The war created anti-German sentiment and the use of the German language was extremely unpopular.

During the early 1920s there was much controversy between parents and teachers at the school, for a number of reasons. Various reports were conducted, with an October 1930 report by the District Inspector concluding that "from the open way in which parents and children talked, I feel that modesty is not one of the virtues of Carbrook".

The school experimented with growing cotton in the school garden, but in April 1923 it was reported that the experiment was unsuccessful as the soil was poor and swampy. The school building was raised onto high stumps in 1932, and the interior walls were lined with vertical boarding. Later that year the rear and sides of the underfloor area was enclosed with corrugated iron.

In September 1936 electricity was connected to the teacher's residence and school building, and a ceiling was installed in the school building in May 1940. To increase light and ventilation, plans had been prepared in May 1941 for the replacement of the east windows of the school building, but it was not until August 1949 that approval was given for the removal of the east sash windows and their replacement with casement windows with fanlights and window hood. The southeast sash window was also removed and walled over.

A six-foot fence was erected between the school and the teacher's residence in May 1952, replacing an earlier timber paling fence. In August 1954 approval was given for asphalting the underfloor area of the school building, which consisted of fine dust and dirt. Due to the removal of the teacher's residence in 1955, the electricity connection was rearranged, as both meters for the school building and teacher's residence were located on the verandah of the residence. In March 1956, the internal painting of the school building was approved, and prior to this the interior wall lining and ceiling had been unpainted. In June 1956 gravel filling was provided for the driveway, parade area and around the school.

In June 1960 two new lights were installed to replace the original single light. In February 1961 the Head Teacher was anxious to start a forestry plot, which was in existence by 1964 and eventually held 375 pine trees. By June 1963 the northeast end of the verandah had been enclosed to form a library.

Student numbers gradually declined (only 16 students in 1974) until 1976, when a significant increase in enrolments necessitated an expansion of facilities at the school. At this time, the school had an extremely high rate of student turnover, and the major source of students was claimed to be the nearby Aquatic Gardens Caravan Park and a Revival Centre.

The school celebrated its centenary in 1977, and a time capsule was buried to the northwest of the school building on 1 October 1977. The school building was restumped with concrete and steel posts, corrugated iron sheeting around the underfloor area was replaced with weatherboard and louvres, and the school was carpeted and repainted. At this time, a demountable classroom (no longer extant) was installed to the northeast of the school building, and an adventure playground was constructed to the west in 1978. From this time, consideration was given to increasing the school grounds but negotiations with neighbouring landholders were not successful. By 1979, the alternative of a replacement school site was being investigated.

In March 1982, a second demountable building (no longer extant) was installed to the east of the school building to be used for classrooms. The original school building was then used as a library, with a staff room on the verandah.

Due to drainage problems on the original school site, it was decided in 1983 to procure a replacement school site. A number of sites were investigated, with the chosen site being located to the west of the school along Beenleigh–Redland Bay Road. Negotiations for the purchase of the site were not successful, and in 1985 the site was recommended to be resumed. Stage one of the replacement school was completed in January 1987, and it opened for the new academic year. The official opening of the replacement school was not held until 14 May 1988.

For a number of years the former Carbrook State School remained vacant. A plan to use the site as a Special Education Facility was investigated for a number of years, but was finally abandoned. The removal of a demountable building was approved in January 1993, and the site was approved for disposal from the Education Department in September 1993.

Since then, the Old Carbrook School has been cared for by Logan City Council and provided to various organisations that provide community services in Logan.

In 2013, Shaftesbury Centre established an animal-assisted learning program for children in care. In June 2017, the program was handed over to Transformed Futures Ltd, who today continue the program as a Special Assistance School. https://www.carbrookcentre.qld.edu.au/

=== The Teacher's Residence ===
The teacher's residence, completed in 1879, was constructed to the east of the school building and was built on low timber stumps with a timber shingled roof.

The first Head Teacher, Horace Heywood, arrived from England in September 1877 and awaited a teacher's residence to be built before he asked his wife and family to join him. No accommodation was made available for him when he arrived, and he was forced to live with two bachelor brothers in filth and confusion ineffable in a small room which swarmed with fleas and bugs that bit me every night. During the Christmas holidays he lived in the school building, at which time the school committee erected a slab humpy, without a floor, and having very small windows. He had to cook on an open air fire, and as the building stood near swampy ground and leaked badly in wet weather his books were spoilt and bedclothing mildewed.

These problems were alleviated with the completion of the teacher's residence in January 1879, which consisted of an L-shaped plan with a kitchen and small verandah at the rear and three main rooms with a verandah at the front. This was later enlarged with the addition of a room at the rear, forming a U-shaped plan with a verandah between, in 1908.

In September 1936 electricity was connected, and in May 1940 a ceiling was installed in the living room of the teacher's residence. In 1954 the residence was severely damaged by a cyclone, and was reported as having been condemned for 17 years. In February 1955, authorisation was given for the residence to be removed, and it was sold to Heindrich Gottfried Berndt of Woongoolba for £160.

== Description ==
The former Carbrook State School building is a high-set timber structure located towards the rear of a large level site and is approached via an avenue of trees leading from Beenleigh-Redland Bay Road to the north.

The building has weatherboard cladding, a corrugated iron gable roof, and is supported by steel and concrete posts. A verandah is located on the north, with a corrugated iron skillion roof, central timber stair, timber posts and timber rail balustrade. Either end of the verandah was enclosed early to form two small rooms, with the northeast room being later extended to the central stair. The building has a central double timber door with glazed fanlight to the verandah, with narrow, paired timber sash windows to either side.

The rear of the building has a central double timber door accessed via a timber stair with a timber and iron awning, with a narrow paired sash window to the west, and the former east window having been closed over with weatherboard. The gable ends originally had three narrow sash windows, evidence of which can be seen in weatherboard infill, but the west gable now has a triple panel of glass louvres and the east has four sets of paired casements with a timber and iron window hood. Each gable has a high level opening which has been closed over.

Internally, the building consists of one large room, with two enclosed rooms on the verandah. Walls have vertically jointed boarding, with boarded ceilings raked to collar beam height, and security bars have been fixed over windows. The northwest verandah room has unlined single-skin walls, a paired casement window, a timber door to the verandah and a doorway which has been cut into the internal wall. The northeast verandah room is larger, and has access to the verandah, but not the main room.

The sub-floor space has a concrete floor and has been partially enclosed with weatherboard and glass louvres to the rear. A storage room is located in the southwest corner, and has been enclosed with vertically jointed boarding and weatherboard.

The building has three corrugated iron rainwater tanks, and a flag pole to the northwest. Two fig trees are located to the north of the building flanking the central driveway, which is lined by an avenue of trees of various species.

A weatherboard toilet block with a skillion roof is located to the south of the building at the rear boundary. Pine trees line the road frontage and the east boundary, and the former playing field is located to the northeast.

== Heritage listing ==
The former Carbrook State School was listed on the Queensland Heritage Register on 21 October 1992 having satisfied the following criteria.

The place is important in demonstrating the evolution or pattern of Queensland's history.

The former Carbrook State School, which opened as Gramzow Provisional School in 1877, functioned for 110 years and reflects the development of, and changes in, Primary Education in Queensland. The building is one of the earliest structures in the area, and as a public building the school is a record of the development of the Carbrook area and the growth of, and changes to, the Carbrook community.

The place is important because of its aesthetic significance.

The former school, with its tree lined driveway and original school building located towards the rear of the site, makes a valuable contribution to the Carbrook landscape.

The place has a strong or special association with a particular community or cultural group for social, cultural or spiritual reasons.

The former school has strong associations with the early German settlers of the district, which is reflected in the importance the current community attaches to the site.
