= Carbrook, Queensland =

Carbrook
- Suburb
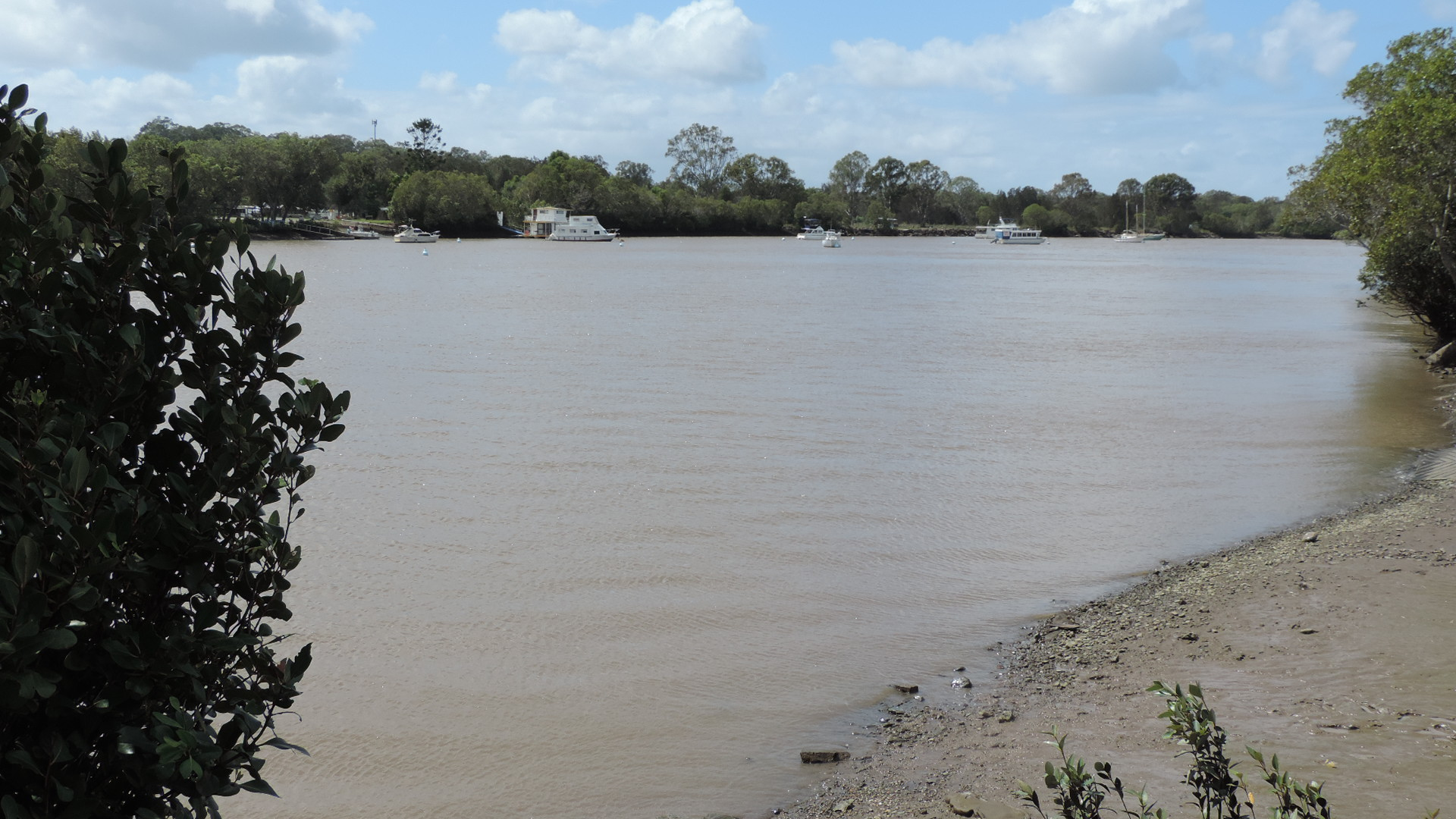
- Logan River at Carbrook Ski Park (left) and Alberton (right), 2014

- Interactive map of Carbrook
- Coordinates: 27.6725°S 153.2527°E
- Country: Australia
- State: Queensland
- City: Logan City
- LGA: Logan City
- Location: 19.8 km (12.3 mi) ESE of Logan Central; 38.1 km (23.7 mi) SE of Brisbane CBD

Government
  - State electorate: Macalister
  - Federal division: Forde

Area
  - Total: 22.4 km^{2} (8.6 sq mi)

Population
  - Total: 1,330 (2021 census)
  - Density: 59.4/km^{2} (153.8/sq mi)
- Time zone: UTC+10:00 (AEST)
- Postcode: 4130
Suburbs around Carbrook
Mount Cotton	Mount Cotton	Redland Bay
Cornubia	Carbrook	Redland Bay
Eagleby	Alberton	Alberton

Carbrook is a suburb in the City of Logan, Queensland, Australia. Carbrook was previously called Gramzow (German: [ˈɡʁam.t͡soː] GRAM-tsoh), a name of German origin, before being changed in 1916 during World War I. In the 2021 census, Carbrook had a population of 1,330 people.

== Geography ==
The Beenleigh–Redland Bay Road runs through from west to east.

== History ==
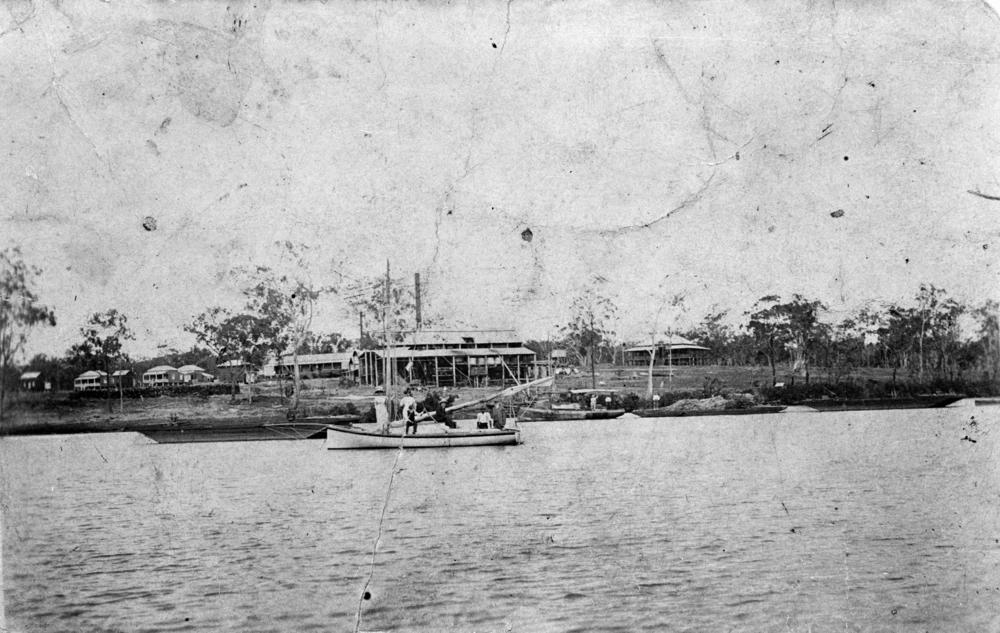
Gramzow Mill at Logan

Carbrook was originally known as Gramzow after the village of Gramzow, Uckermark, Northern Germany, the name being given to it by the early German settlers who arrived in 1867.

The Alberton Ferry was established 1870 to cross the Logan River between Ferry Road at Carbrook (27.6923°S 153.2608°E) and Alberton Road at Alberton. Following the opening of the Logan Bridge in 1931, usage of the ferry declined and it was closed in 1948.

Gramzow State School opened on 5 November 1877, being renamed Carbrook State School in 1916. It relocated to its present location in 1987 with the former school building still extant and listed on the Queensland Heritage Register.

During World War I, German names were unpopular and many German- or German-sounding placenames were changed. In 1916, Gramzow was renamed Carbrook. Its school and post office were also renamed Carbrook.

Until 1949, Carbrook was within the Shire of Tingalpa.

Calvary Christian College opened on 1 February 1978.

Christian Life College opened on 5 February 1979 and closed on 16 December 1993.

Kimberley College opened in January 2000.

The Carbrook campus of the Calvary Christian College opened in 2002.

== Demographics ==
In the 2011 census, Carbrook had a population of 1,195 people, of whom 48.1% were female and 51.9% were male. The median age of the Carbrook population was 47 years old, 10 years above the national median of 37. 74.2% of people living in Carbrook were born in Australia. The other top responses of country of birth were England (6.4%), New Zealand (3.7%), Scotland (1.3%), Germany (1.0%) and India (1.0%). 89.8% of people only spoke English at home; the next most common languages were Punjabi (1.6%), Arabic (0.8%), Dutch (0.8%), Spanish (0.3%) and Italian (0.3%).

In the 2016 census, Carbrook had a population of 1,216 people, of whom 49.5% were female and 50.5% were male. The median age of the Carbrook population was 48 years old, 10 years above the national median of 38. 78.3% of people living in Carbrook were born in Australia. The other top responses for country of birth were England (5.2%), New Zealand (3.2%), Scotland (1.1%), India (1.0%), and the Netherlands (0.7%). 91.6% of people spoke only English at home; the next most common languages were Punjabi (1.7%), Dutch and Afrikaans (0.5% each), Italian (0.4%), and Spanish (0.3%).

In the 2021 census, Carbrook had a population of 1,330, of whom 49.6% were female and 50.4% were male. The median age of the Carbrook population was 46 years old, 8 years above the National median of 38. 79.1% of people living in Carbrook were born in Australia. The other top responses for country of birth were England (5.3%), New Zealand (4.4%), Germany (0.9%), Ireland (0.8%), and South Africa (0.8%). 91.1% of people spoke only English at home; the next most common languages were Punjabi (1.7%), Dutch (0.8%), Arabic (0.8%), Indonesian (0.7%) and Croatian (0.5%).

== Heritage listings ==
Carbrook has a number of heritage-listed sites, including:

- Carbrook Lutheran Cemetery, Mount Cotton Road
- Fachwerk Farmhouse, 445–469 Beenleigh Redland Bay Road
- Old Carbrook State School, 597–605 Beenleigh Redland Bay Road

== Education ==
Carbrook State School is a government primary (Prep–6) school for boys and girls at Redland Bay Road (27.6780°S 153.2352°E). In 2018, the school had an enrolment of 452 students with 34 teachers (29 full-time equivalent) and 19 non-teaching staff (12 full-time equivalent). It includes a special education program.

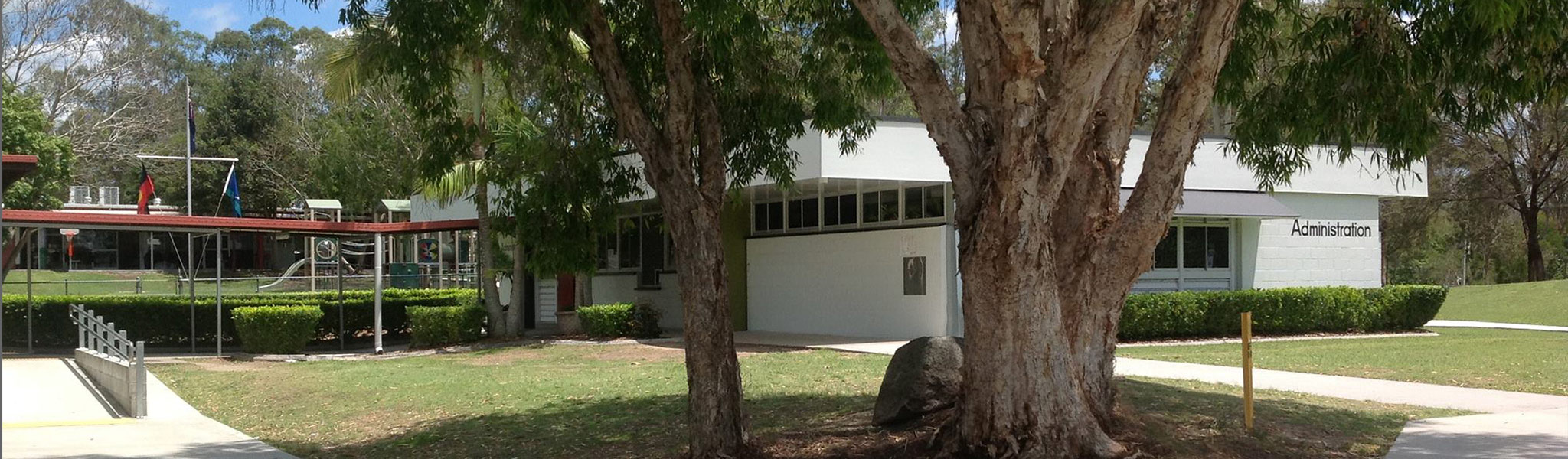
Carbrook State School, circa 2021

Kimberley College is a private primary and secondary (Prep–12) school for boys and girls at 35–41 Kruger Road (27.6809°S 153.2356°E). In 2018, the school had an enrolment of 855 students with 60 teachers and 28 non-teaching staff (27 full-time equivalent).

Calvary Christian College is a private primary and secondary (Prep–12) school. It has two campuses, one at 559–581 Beenleigh-Redland Bay Road in Carbrook (27.6782°S 153.2404°E) and the other in Springwood.

Carbrook Animal Assisted Learning Centre is a private secondary (7–12) special education school at 597–605 Beenleigh Redland Bay Road (the Old Carbrook State School, 27.6792°S 153.2424°E). It provides support for students who have disengaged from mainstream schooling through the use of animal therapy.

There is no government secondary school in Carbrook. The nearest government secondary school is Shailer Park State High School in Shailer Park to the west.

== Facilities ==
Great Southern Memorial Park is a cemetery and crematorium at 1774–1794 Mount Cotton Road (27.6532°S 153.2408°E).

Wirunya Aged Care Centre is an aged care facility at 559–581 Beenleigh Redland Bay Road (27.6795°S 153.2385°E).

== Amenities ==
Recreational fishing is popular along the Logan River.

There are two boat ramps into the Logan River, both managed by the Logan City Council:

- at the south end of Reidel Road (27.6952°S 153.2794°E)
- at the south end of Skinners Road (27.6812°S 153.2269°E)

There are a number of parks in the area:

- California Creek Park (27.6778°S 153.2200°E)
- Native Dog Creek East Park (27.6617°S 153.2667°E)
- Native Dog Creek Park (27.6510°S 153.2486°E)
- Skinners Park (27.6799°S 153.2267°E)

== Attractions ==
The Carbrook Golf Club, located at 653 Beenleigh Redland Bay Road (27.6846°S 153.2471°E), is near the confluence of the Logan River and its tributary, the Albert River. More than a dozen bull sharks inhabited an oxbow lake at the south edge of the golf course, and locals claim that the sharks likely arrived there following a flood in the 1990s. The club has embraced the existence of the sharks, having adopted a shark-shaped logo and running monthly Shark Lake Challenge golf competitions; eventually, during another flood, the sharks migrated back to the river.

Carbrook is home to one of three cable skiing parks in Australia. Bayside Wake Park (formerly Cable Ski Logan) is at 80 Ferry Road next to the Logan River (27.6910°S 153.2619°E). It is suitable for the first time kneeboarder to the experienced wakeboarder.

Aquatic Gardens Caravan Park is at 833–901 Beenleigh Redland Bay Road near the cable ski (27.6882°S 153.2628°E).

== Notable residents ==
- Lily Sullivan, actress born in Carbrook

== See also ==
- Australian place names changed from German names
