= Eagleby, Queensland =

Eagleby
- Suburb
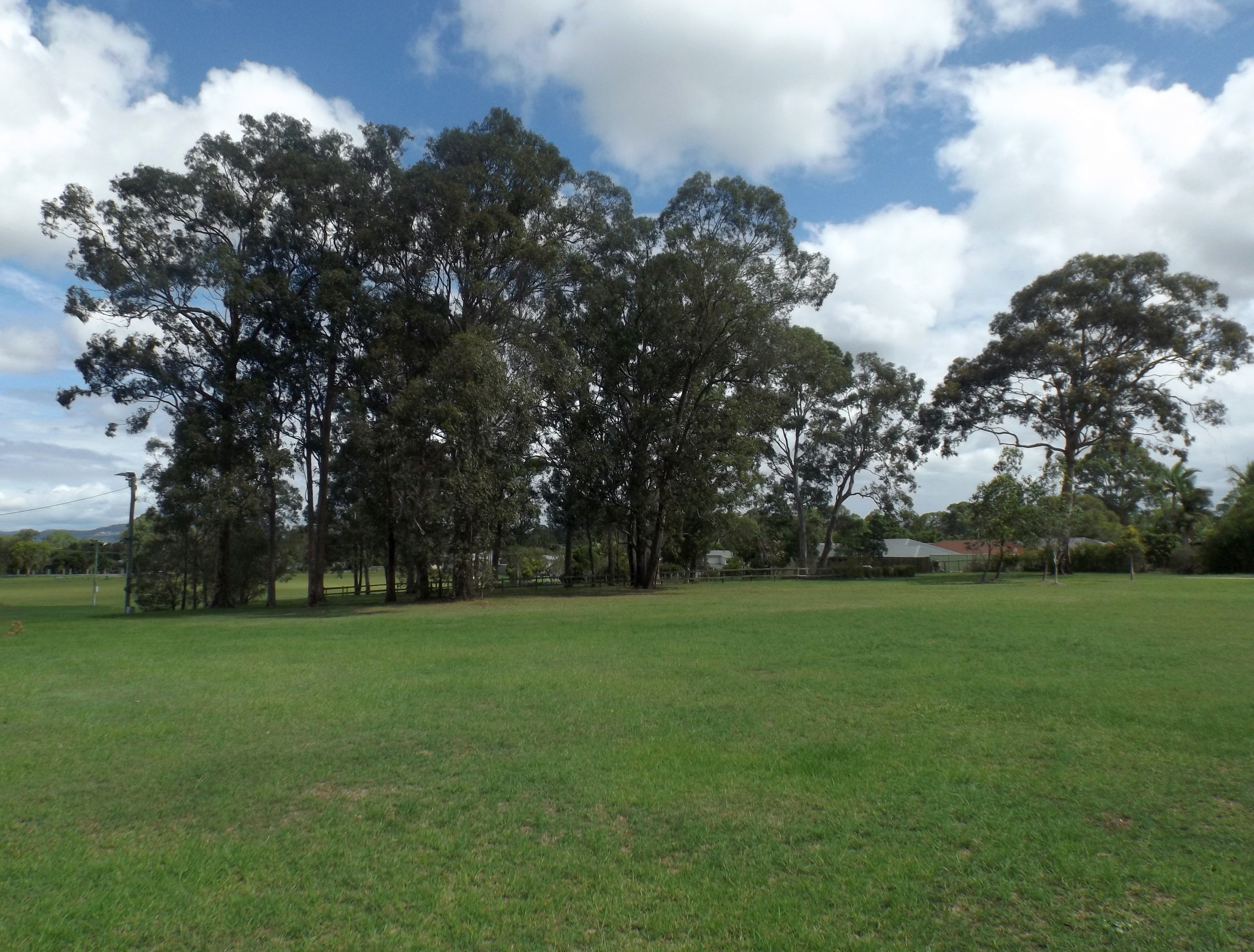
- Olivers Sports Complex

- Interactive map of Eagleby
- Coordinates: 27.7030°S 153.2197°E
- Country: Australia
- State: Queensland
- City: Logan City
- LGA: Logan City
- Location: 15.5 km (9.6 mi) SE of Logan Central; 34.3 km (21.3 mi) SE of Brisbane CBD

Government
  - State electorate: Macalister
  - Federal division: Forde

Area
  - Total: 13.8 km^{2} (5.3 sq mi)

Population
  - Total: 13,594 (2021 census)
  - Density: 985/km^{2} (2,551/sq mi)
- Time zone: UTC+10:00 (AEST)
- Postcode: 4207
Suburbs around Eagleby
Loganholme	Cornubia	Carbrook
Beenleigh	Eagleby	Alberton
Beenleigh	Yatala	Stapylton

Eagleby (formerly Philadelphia) is a suburb in the City of Logan, Queensland, Australia. In the 2021 census, Eagleby had a population of 13,594 people.

== Geography ==
Eagleby is immediately east of Beenleigh, and is 32 km south-east of central Brisbane, being located on the southern bank of the Logan River at the juncture with the Albert river, which forms the southern and eastern boundary. The Pacific Motorway marks the western boundary. Eagleby was originally a suburb of Beenleigh.

== History ==
Eagleby was originally known as Philadelphia.

In October 1905, tenders were called for the erection of a provisional school. Eagleby Provisional School opened in 1906. On 1 January 1909, it became Eagleby State School. It closed in 1966. It was located at 133 Eagleby Road (27.68702°S 153.21806°E). The school building was purchased for use as a private residence, but was removed circa 2021. It is approximately 1 kilometre (0.62 mi) from the present school location.

Eagleby was a sugar-growing area and had one of the many sugar mills in the Logan/Albert Shire district. When its mill closed in 1943 it was the second last in operation.

Eagleby South State School opened on 23 January 1978.

The fire station on the Pacific Motorway was built in September 1983.

On 25 January 1988, a new Eagleby State School opened at a new location.

Eagleby Plaza (the supermarket and 21 other shops) opened in 1989.

Eagleby Learning Centre opened in 1992.

== Demographics ==
In the 2011 census, Eagleby had a population of 11,971 people, 51.0% female and 49.0% male. The median age of the Eagleby population was 33 years, 4 years below the national median of 37. 68.1% of people were born in Australia. The most common countries of birth were New Zealand 8.9%, England 4.9%, Philippines 1.1%, Scotland 0.6%, and Germany 0.5%. 83.9% of people spoke only English at home; the next-most common languages were 0.7% Samoan, 0.7% Turkish, 0.5% Spanish, 0.4% Tagalog, and 0.4% Filipino.

In the 2016 census, Eagleby had a population of 13,326 people, 47.9% male and 52.1% female. The median age of the Eagleby population was 37 years, 1 year below the national median of 38. Aboriginal and Torres Strait Islander people made up 4.4% of the population. 65.5% of people were born in Australia. The most common countries of birth were New Zealand 10.2%, England 4.5% and Philippines 1.2%. 81.4% of people spoke only English at home. Other languages spoken at home included Turkish 1.2% and Maori (New Zealand) 0.8%. The most common responses for religion were No Religion 31.4%, Catholic 15.9% and Anglican 14.7%. Eagleby has the largest Turkish Australian community of any suburb in Queensland, numbering 183 individuals and making up 1.4% of the suburb's population.

In the 2021 census, Eagleby had a population of 13,594 people, 51.3% female and 48.7% male. The median age of the Eagleby population was 37 years, 1 year below the national median of 38. 64.1% of people were born in Australia. The most common countries of birth were New Zealand 8.6%, England 4.2%, Philippines 1.5%, India 1.3%, and Turkey 0.5%. 77.5% of people spoke only English at home; the next-most common languages were 1.1% Turkish, 0.9% Punjabi, 0.8% Tagalog, 0.7% Maori (New Zealand), and 0.6% Mandarin.

== Education ==
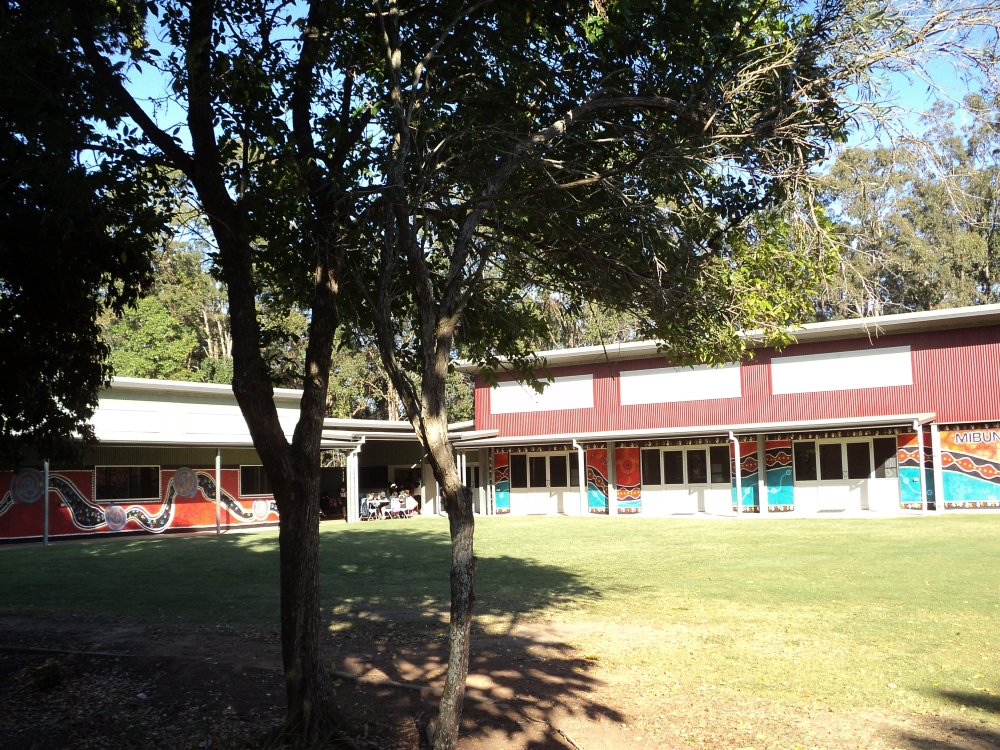
Eagleby State School, 2010

Eagleby State School is a government primary (Prep–6) school for boys and girls at 222–2660 Fryar Road (corner of Herses Road, 27.6928°S 153.2144°E). In 2018, the school had an enrolment of 548 students with 43 teachers (38 full-time equivalent) and 31 non-teaching staff (18 full-time equivalent). It includes a special education program.

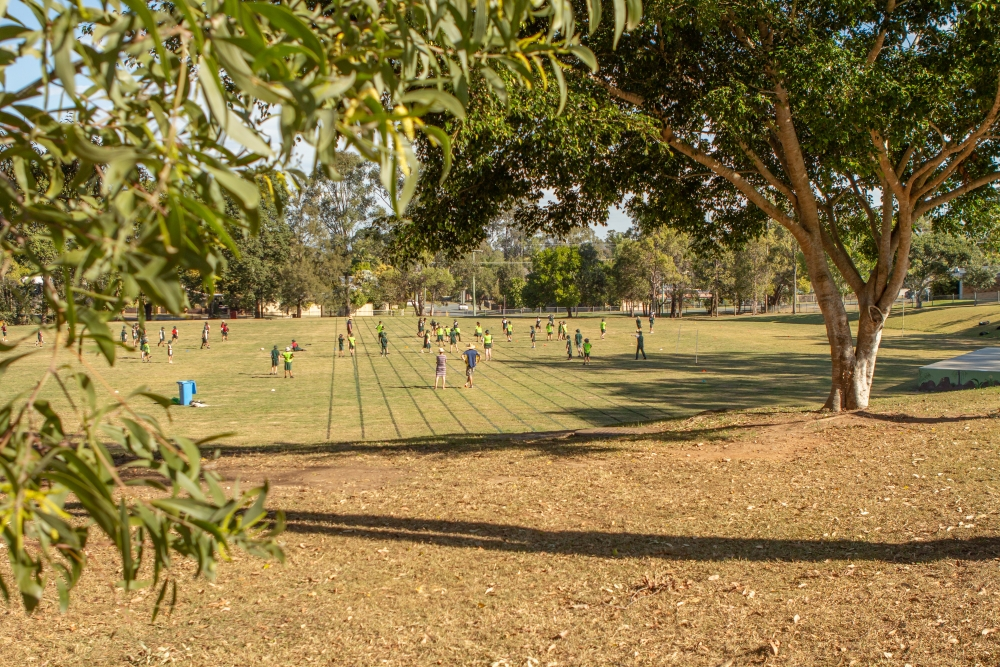
Sports field, Eagleby State School, 2018

Eagleby South State School is a government primary (Prep–6) school for boys and girls at the corner of 131–171 River Hills Road (corner of Fryar Road, 27.7036°S 153.2130°E). In 2018, the school had an enrolment of 492 students with 39 teachers (36 full-time equivalent) and 27 non-teaching staff (19 full-time equivalent). It includes a special education program.

STEPS Positive Learning Centre is a specific-purpose primary and secondary (5–10) school 131–171 River Hills Road (corner of Fryar Road, 27.7036°S 153.2130°E). The role of Positive Learning Centres is to re-engage with school-age children who need intervention to enable them to return to conventional schooling or to transition into vocational training.

Eagleby Learning Centre is a secondary (7–12) Centre for Continuing Secondary Education at 161 Herses Road (27.6947°S 153.2124°E). It provides secondary education with flexible delivery for "second chance learners", for school-age and adult students, who have disengaged from conventional schooling in the past.

There are no mainstream secondary schools in Eagleby. The nearest government secondary school is Beenleigh State High School in neighbouring Beenleigh to the south-east.

== Facilities ==
A wastewater treatment plant is located in Eagleby. The facility was established in 1967 and processes water in three stages before releasing it into the Albert River.

== Amenities ==
There is a post office at Eagleby Shopping Plaza at the corner of River Hills and Fryar Roads. Major shopping centres and services are at Beenleigh and the Logan Hyperdome at Loganholme. Eagleby is also the home of the Beenleigh Distillery and Twin Rivers Food Co Op.

Eagleby Community Hall is located at 112 Fryar Road.

The Eagleby branch of the Queensland Country Women's Association meets at Cowper Avenue.

== Transport ==
There is a bus service (Logan City Bus Service), Translink 563 that runs approximately 6:00am to 7:00pm weekdays with a reduced service on Saturdays. The 553 runs at the west end of River Hills Road hourly into the evenings and on weekends, however this does not service the majority of homes in Eagleby. Most of the homes in Eagleby lie between 2 kilometres (1.2 mi) and 6 kilometres (3.7 mi) from Beenleigh Railway Station.

== See also ==
- Beenleigh Rum
