= Kimberley College, Carbrook =

School in Queensland, Australia

Location
- 35-41 Kruger Road, Carbrook, Queensland, Australia; 27.68017°S 153.23454°E

Information
- School type: Private
- Motto: With Courage and Compassion
- Established: 2000
- Principal: Glenn Johnson
- Teaching staff: 50 (2023)
- Grades: Prep to Year 12
- Enrollment: 742 (2023)
- Website: Official site

Kimberley College is an independent coeducational primary and secondary school located in the Logan City suburb of Carbrook, Queensland, Australia. It is administered by Independent Schools Queensland, with an enrolment of 742 students and a teaching staff of 50, as of 2023. The school serves students from Prep to Year 12.

== History ==
The school was established on 1 January 2000, being founded by Paul Thomson, who served as the principal until he was dismissed in May 2018 for mismanaging the school's funds. The original school was located in Mount Cotton but moved to its current location on Kruger Road in 2003.

In 2017, less than two percent of students at the school were taking the NAPLAN test due to parents having the knowledge that they could withdraw them under philosophical or religious grounds. While the principal denied actively encouraging withdrawals, he acknowledged that NAPLAN can cause significant and unnecessary stress for students.

In 2018, after a financial audit was conducted by the school's board, it was revealed that the foundation principal, Paul Thomson had taken roughly $800,000 from the school, which approximately $700,000 of it was spent on vacations for him and his family. The school community was divided on the issue, with separate online petitions being created, some for the principal to be dismissed and others for him to be kept.

After a through police investigation on the matter was conducted, which was sparked when the Education Department alerted police in August 2018, it was revealed that the principal gave himself "$221,000 in backpay, spent $819,000 on luxury overseas trips and accrued $197,000 on the school's credit card." After raids were conducted through July and August of 2019, which seized documents, computers and mobile phones, the former principal, along with his associates, were arrested and charged by September. It was reported that approximately $4.6 million was taken from the school between the period of 2012 and 2018. As of March 2023, court proceedings were still ongoing.

== Demographics ==
In 2023, the school had a student enrollment of 742 with 50 teachers (48.6 full-time equivalent) and 26 non-teaching staff (24.1 full-time equivalent). Female enrollments consisted of 415 students and Male enrollments consisted of 327 students; Indigenous enrollments accounted for a total of 2% and 9% of students had a language background other than English.

== See also ==
- List of schools in Greater Brisbane
