= Stapylton, Queensland =

Stapylton
- Suburb
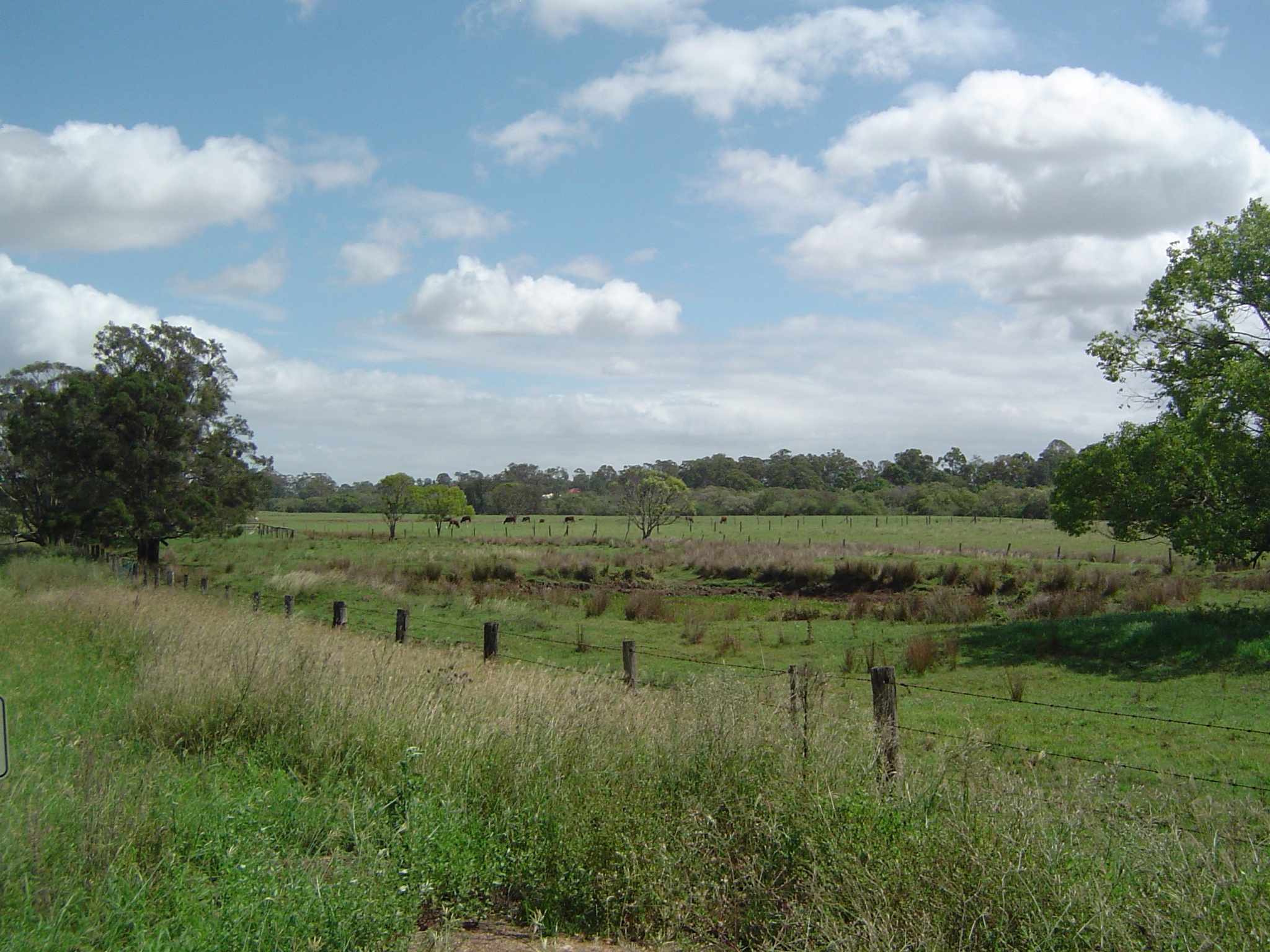
- Paddocks along Bruckner Road, 2014

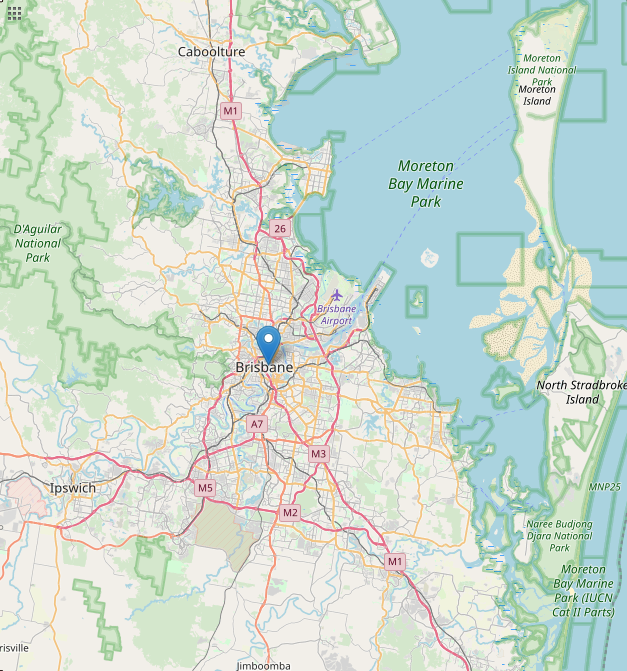
- Interactive map of Stapylton
- Coordinates: 27.7302°S 153.2447°E
- Country: Australia
- State: Queensland
- City: Gold Coast
- LGA: City of Gold Coast
- Location: 6.0 km (3.7 mi) ESE of Beenleigh; 38.4 km (23.9 mi) NNW of Southport; 38.8 km (24.1 mi) SE of Brisbane; 40.7 km (25.3 mi) NNW of Surfers Paradise

Government
  - State electorate: Coomera
  - Federal division: Fadden

Area
  - Total: 15.0 km^{2} (5.8 sq mi)

Population
  - Total: 430 (2021 census)
  - Density: 28.7/km^{2} (74.2/sq mi)
- Time zone: UTC+10:00 (AEST)
- Postcode: 4207
Suburbs around Stapylton
Eagleby	Alberton	Alberton
Yatala	Stapylton	Norwell
Yatala	Ormeau	Norwell

Stapylton is a mixed-use locality in the City of Gold Coast, Queensland, Australia. In the 2021 census, Stapylton had a population of 430 people.

== Geography ==
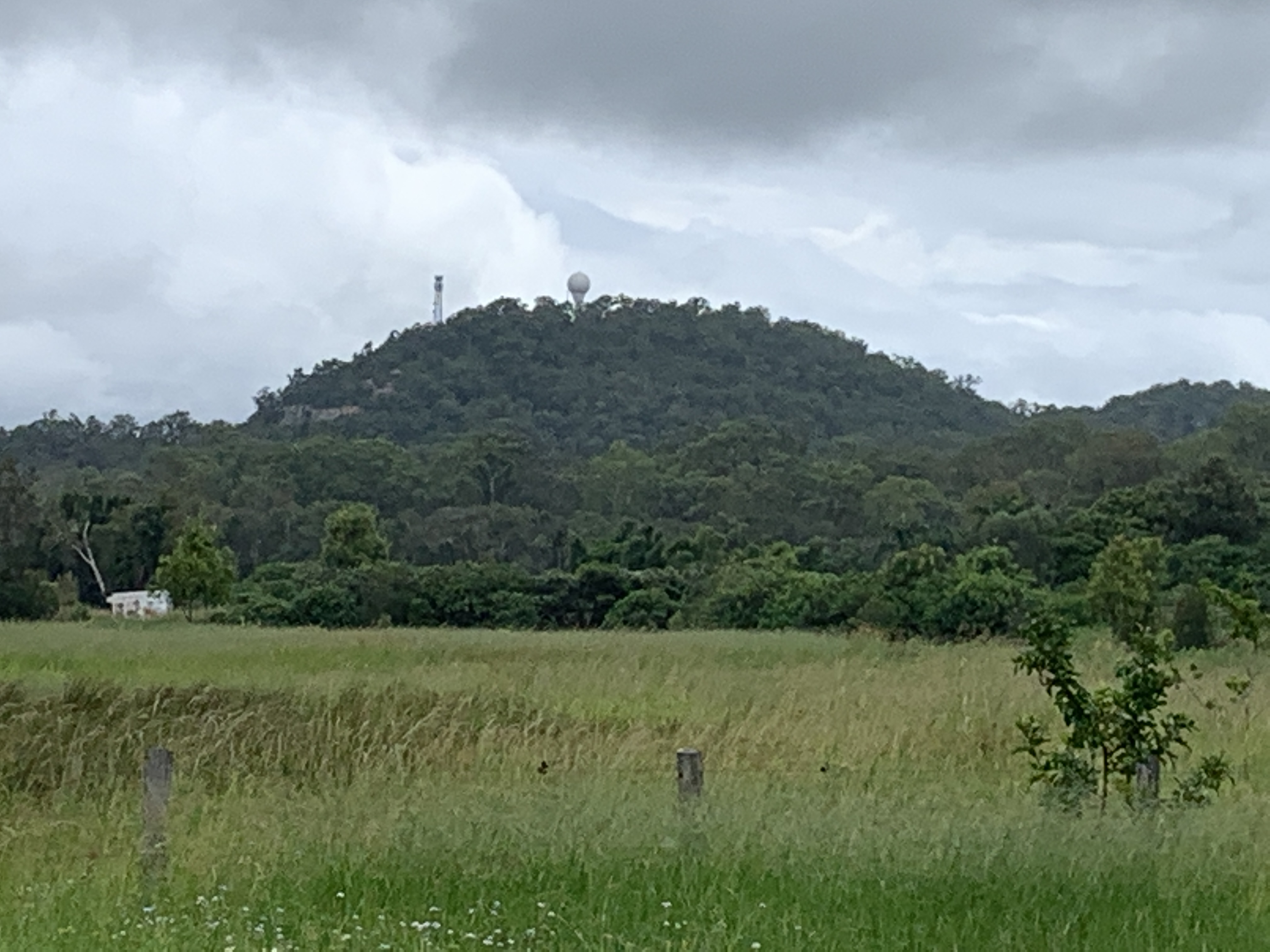
Mount Stapylton, as seen from Rotary Park Road, Alberton, 2022

Stapylton is bounded to the west by the Albert River and the Pacific Motorway.

Stapylton has the following mountains in the north of the locality:

- Mount Stapylton (Yellowwood Mountain) (27.7176°S 153.2397°E) 152 metres (499 ft) above sea level
- Quinns Hill (27.7238°S 153.2456°E) 42 metres (138 ft) above sea level

== History ==
The area was named after surveyor Granville William Chetwynd Stapylton (1800–1840), who was killed by Aborigines on 31 May 1840, near Mount Lindesay.

Stapylton railway station was the first one to open after Beenleigh on the South Coastline in 1889.

Stapylton State School opened on 18 May 1920. It closed in 1961. The school was located on the south-eastern corner of Hester Drive and Stapylton Jacobs Well Road (approx 27.7349°S 153.2309°E).

The Yatala drive-in theatre was opened on 27 October 1974.

Stapylton was once part of the Shire of Albert until its amalgamation in 1995.

== Demographics ==
In the 2011 census, Stapylton recorded a population of 445 people, 43.8% female and 56.2% male. The median age of the Stapylton population was 42 years, 5 years above the national median of 37. 71.5% of people living in Stapylton were born in Australia. The other top responses for country of birth were New Zealand 6.1%, England 5.4%, Philippines 2.5%, Fiji 1.4% and India 1.1%. 88.3% of people spoke only English at home; the next most common languages were 2.3% Hindi, 1.4% Tagalog, 0.9% Maltese, 0.9% Filipino and 0.9% Shona.

In the 2016 census, Stapylton recorded a population of 444 people, 41.2% female and 58.8% male. The median age of the Stapylton population was 41 years, 3 years above the national median of 38. 74.1% of people living in Stapylton were born in Australia. The other top responses for country of birth were New Zealand 6.8%, England 3.8%, South Africa 1.4%, Germany 0.9% and Philippines 0.9%. 86.1% of people only spoke English at home; the next most common languages were 1.4% Mandarin, 0.9% Afrikaans, 0.9% Zulu, 0.7% Greek and 0.7% Italian.

In the 2021 census, Stapylton recorded a population of 430 people, 42.7% female and 57.3% male. The median age of the Stapylton population was 45 years, 7 years above the national median of 38. 69.1% of people living in Stapylton were born in Australia. The other top responses for country of birth were New Zealand 5.6%, England 3.0%, South Africa 2.1%, Germany 0.9% and Samoa 0.7%. 81.6% of people only spoke English at home; the next most common languages were 0.9% German, 0.9% Ndebele, and 0.7% Maltese.

== Economy ==
Australia's first green waste to energy power plant was built at Stapylton.

The suburb contains the Mount Stapylton Weather station, several quarries and the Stapylton Landfill and Recycling Centre. The radar tower is 30 m tall and was completed in 2006.

Apart from the inevitable transport service centre and take-away restaurant on the motorway, Stapylton has an industrial park, Aldi, Harvey Norman, three quarries and the Yatala twin drive-in. There is also the Ecomemorial Park crematorium.

== Education ==
There are no schools in Staplyton. The nearest government primary school is Mount Warren Park State School in Mount Warren Park to the west. The nearest government secondary school is Beenleigh State High School in Beenleigh to the west and Ormeau Woods State High School in Ormeau to the south.

== Amenities ==
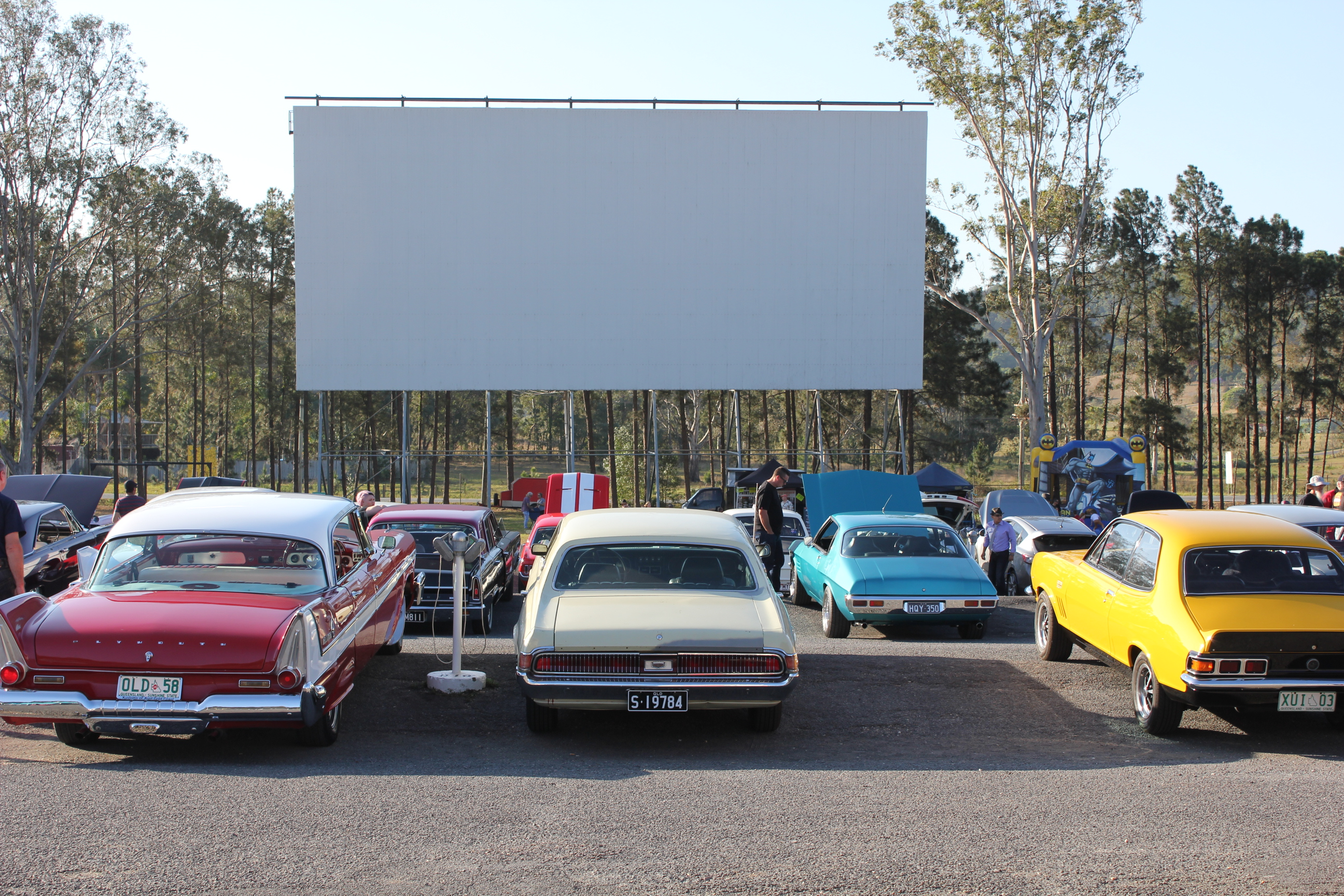
Yatala Drive-In 2013

The Yatala drive-in theatre is at 100 Stapylton Jacobs Well Road (27.7308°S 153.2376°E). It contains two large screens and covers 10 acres (4.0 ha).

== Motor sport ==
Supercars team Dick Johnson Racing is based in Stapylton as was Tekno Autosports.
