= Albert River (South East Queensland) =

River in Queensland, Australia

Albert
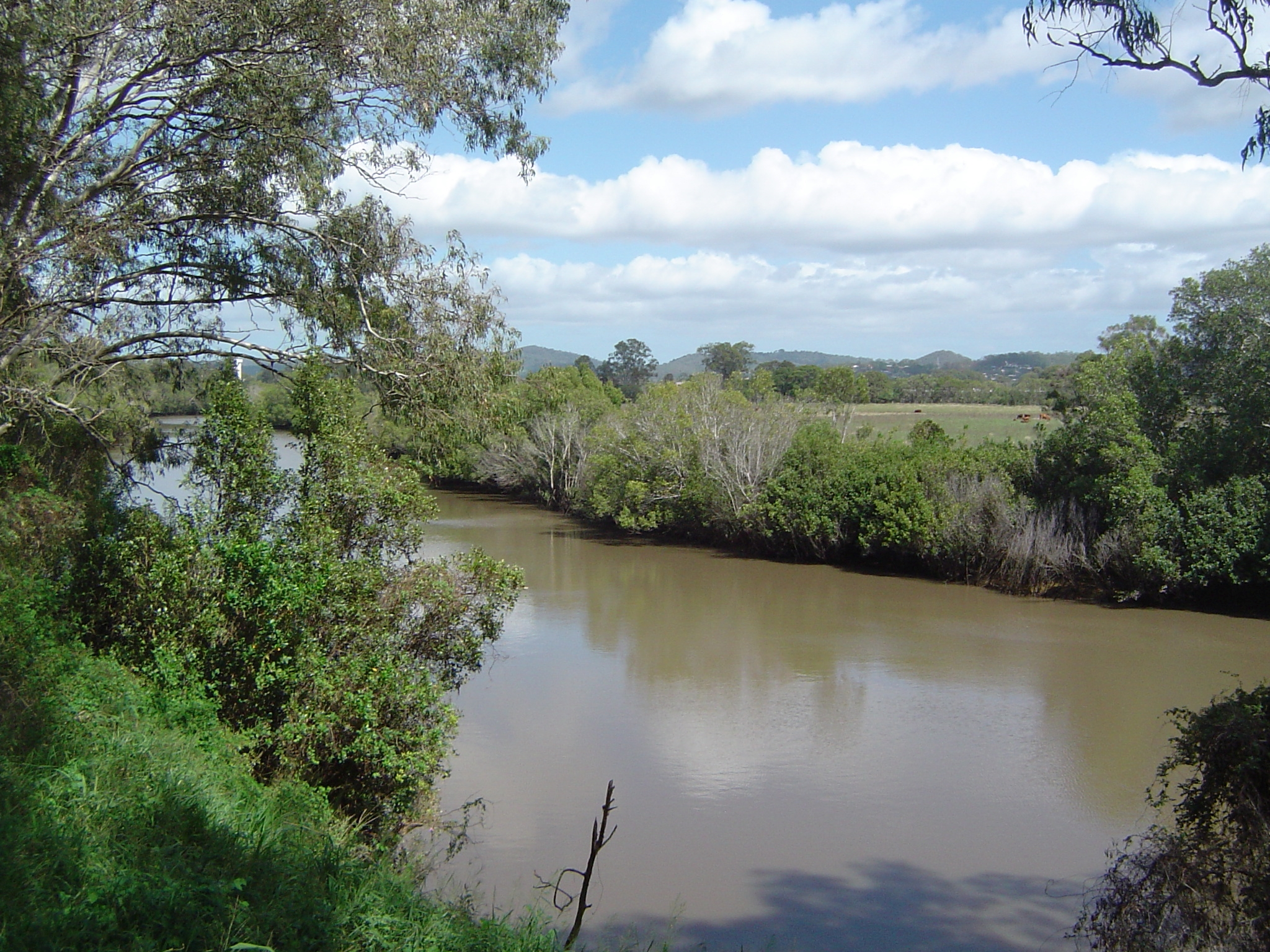
- Albert River at Stapylton, 2014

- Location of Albert River river mouth in Queensland
- Etymology: Prince Albert of Saxe-Coburg and Gotha

Location
- Country: Australia
- State: Queensland
- Region: South East Queensland
- Local government areas: Scenic Rim Region, City of Gold Coast

Physical characteristics
- Source: McPherson Range, Great Dividing Range
- Source confluence: Right and Left Branches of the Albert River
  - location: below Neglected Mountain
  - coordinates: 28°12′44″S 153°2′36″E
  - elevation: 184 m (604 ft)
- Mouth: confluence with the Logan River
  - location: Alberton
  - coordinates: 27°41′44″S 153°14′24″E
  - elevation: 3 m (9.8 ft)
- Length: 102 km (63 mi)
- Basin size: 782 km^{2} (302 sq mi)

Basin features
- River system: Logan River

The Albert River is a perennial river in the South East region of Queensland, Australia. Its catchment lies within the Gold Coast and Scenic Rim Region local government areas and covers an area of 782 square kilometres (302 sq mi). The river provides potable water for the town of Beaudesert.

== Course and features ==
Formed by the confluence of the Right and Left Branches of the river that begin in the Lamington National Park and drain the northern slopes of the Border Ranges within the Great Dividing Range, the Albert River rises below Neglected Mountain and east of the settlement of Hillview. The river flows generally north, joined by six minor tributaries before reaching its confluence with the Logan River between Alberton and Eagleby. From there the Logan flows a further 12 kilometres (7.5 mi) before entering Moreton Bay. The Albert River catchment is bounded by the McPherson Range to the south, the Beechmont Range in the east and the Jinbroken Range and Birnam Range to the west. The river's upper catchment is heavily influenced by the national parks of Tamborine, Main Range and the Lamington Plateau, and numerous local government-owned reserves and conservation areas, that comprise part of the Shield Volcano Group of the UNESCO World Heritage Site Gondwana Rainforests of Australia.

Tributaries of the Albert River include the Stockyard Creek, Duck Creek, Kerry Creek, Cainbable Creek, Canungra Creek and Bidaddaba Creek.

The Albert River is crossed by the Pacific Motorway, the Old Pacific Highway, and the Gold Coast railway line at Yatala.

== History ==
Yugembah (also known as Yugumbir, Jugambel, Jugambeir, Jugumbir, Jukam, Jukamba) is one of the Australian Aboriginal languages in areas that include the Albert River, Gold Coast, Logan, Scenic Rim, Beaudesert, Beenleigh, Coolangatta, Coomera, Logan River, Pimpama, Tamborine and Tweed River Valley, within the local government boundaries of the City of Gold Coast, City of Logan, Scenic Rim Regional Council and the Tweed River Valley.

Mununjali (also known as Mananjahli, Manaldjahli and Manandjali) is a dialect of the Yugambeh language. The Mununjali language area includes landscape within the local government boundaries of the Scenic Rim and Beaudesert Shire Councils.

The river was named by Robert Dixon in honour of Prince Albert of Saxe-Coburg and Gotha. A rise in the Albert River would see access to O'Reilly's Rainforest Retreat difficult or impossible during its early years of operation.

Floods have been recorded on the Albert River in 1925, 1947, 1972, 1976, 1980, 1989, 2013 and 2017 (Cyclone Debbie). In 1884, the S.S. Walrus ran aground on the bank of the river. The vessel had been used as a floating sugar mill and distillery.

=== Proposed dam ===
In 1989, the Goss Government rejected a proposal to build Wolffdene Dam on the Albert River. Later, a dam near Glendower Homestead was once planned in a Queensland Government water strategy report from 1990. The option was discarded after it was revealed the site was too costly to build a dam for the amount of water it would have provided.

== Environmental concerns ==
The water quality of the Albert River remains in relatively good condition until it merges with the Logan River where the quality declines. Residential and industry development and land clearing in the catchment have deteriorated the water quality of the Albert River, particularly in its lower reaches. Key environmental issues that face the catchment are rapid population increase and development; altered flow patterns of the creek causing active erosion; deteriorating water quality; increased noise and vehicle movements; waste disposal; invasion of bushland by exotic plants and animals; management of the extractive industries; and day-to-day behaviour of residents and workers of the catchment.

== Gallery ==
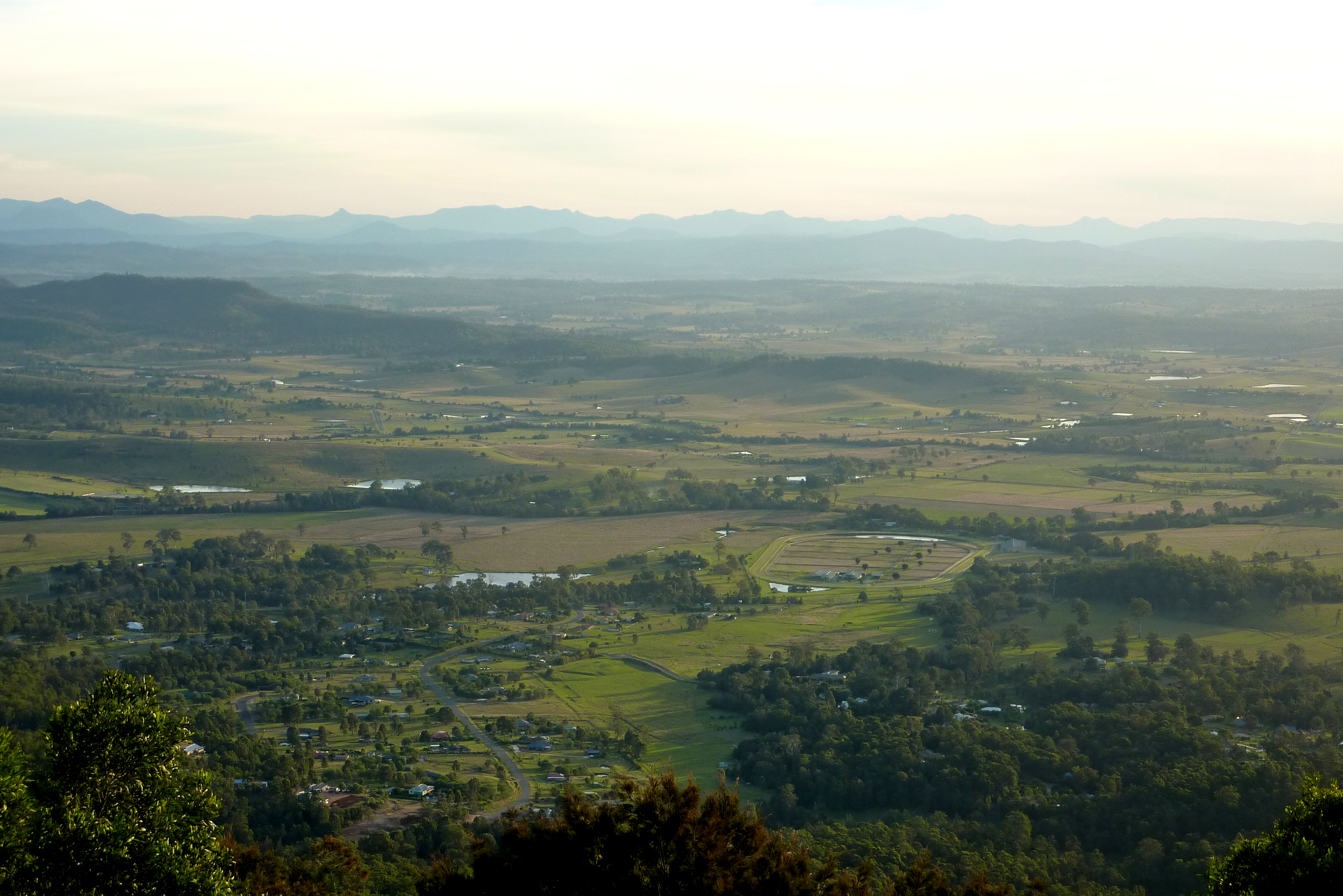
View west over Wonglepong and the Albert River, 2010

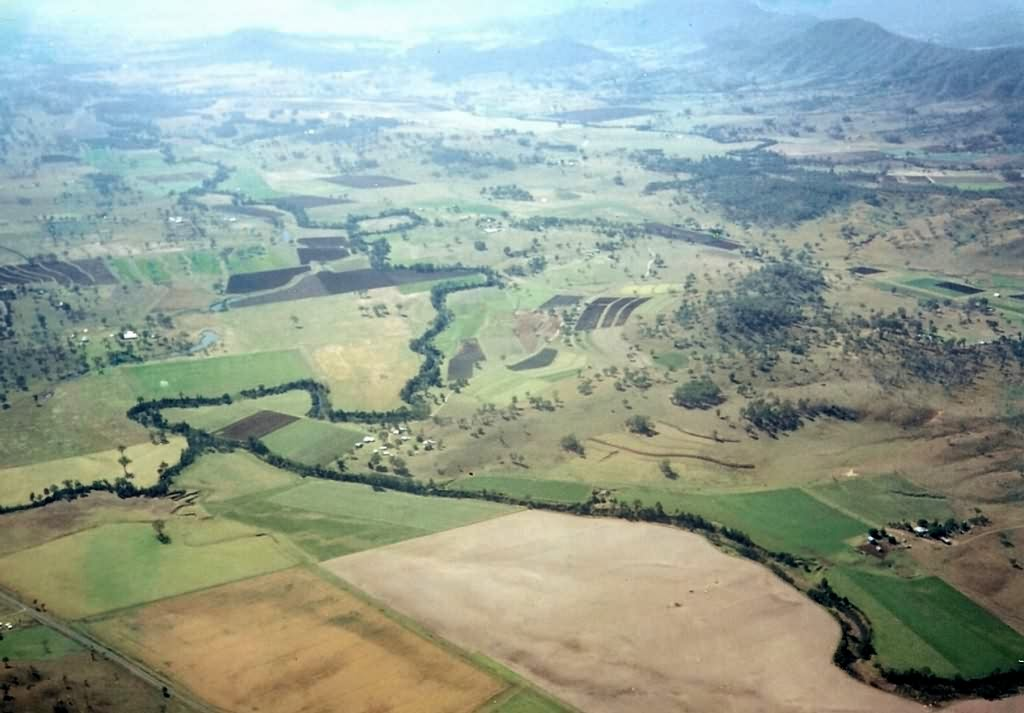
The Albert River valley and farmlands, south east of Beaudesert. Cainbable Creek flows into the Albert River from the east.

== See also ==
- List of rivers of Australia § Queensland
