= Alberton, Queensland =

Alberton
- Suburb
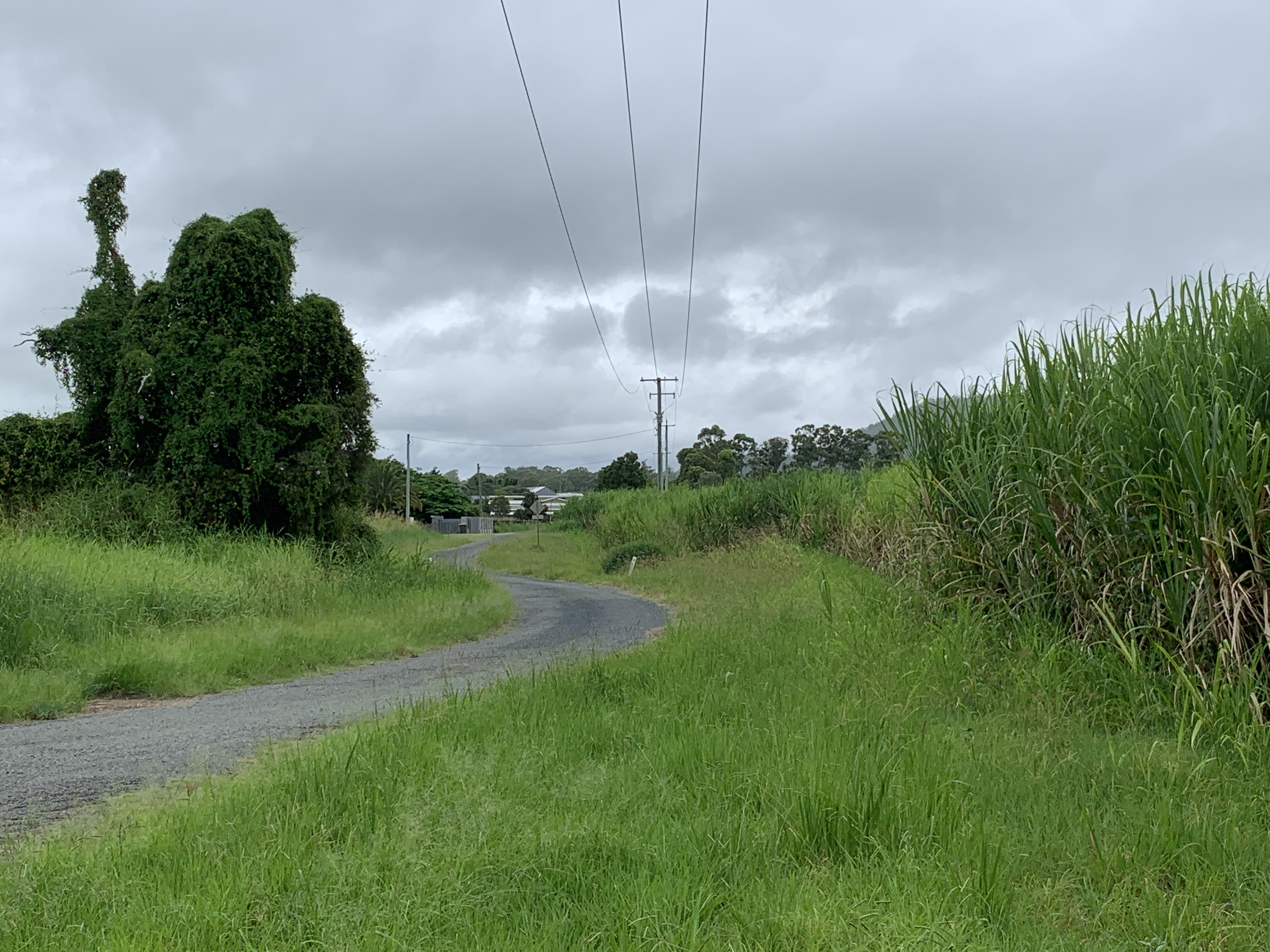
- Sugarcane fields, looking south down Cane Farm Road, Alberton, 2022

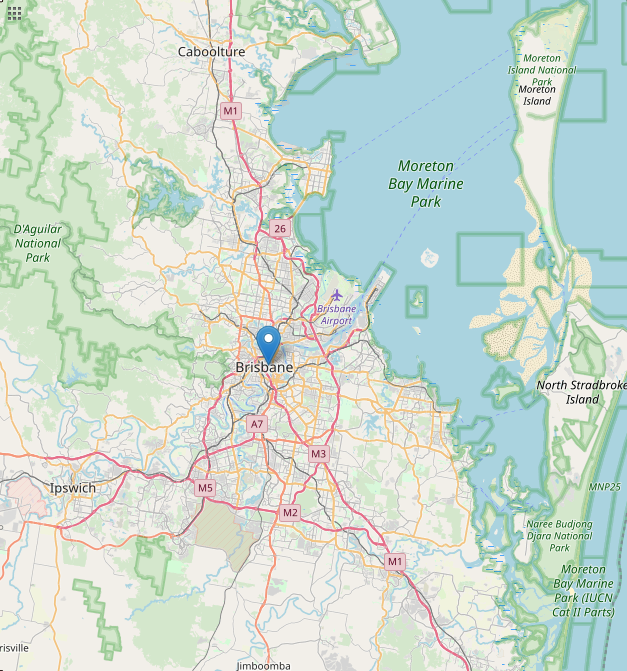
- Interactive map of Alberton
- Coordinates: 27.7069°S 153.2688°E
- Country: Australia
- State: Queensland
- City: Gold Coast
- LGA: City of Gold Coast
- Location: 12.7 km (7.9 mi) E of Beenleigh; 45.1 km (28.0 mi) N of Southport; 46.4 km (28.8 mi) N of Surfers Paradise; 45.5 km (28.3 mi) SSE of Brisbane

Government
  - State electorate: Coomera
  - Federal division: Fadden

Area
  - Total: 17.0 km^{2} (6.6 sq mi)

Population
  - Total: 547 (2021 census)
  - Density: 32.18/km^{2} (83.3/sq mi)
- Time zone: UTC+10:00 (AEST)
- Postcode: 4207
Suburbs around Alberton
Eagleby	Carbrook	Redland Bay
Eagleby	Alberton	Woongoolba
Stapylton	Gilberton	Woongoolba

Alberton is a rural locality in the City of Gold Coast, Queensland, Australia. In the 2021 census, Alberton had a population of 547 people.

== Geography ==
Alberton is bounded in the north by the Logan River and in the west by its tributary, the Albert River.

== History ==
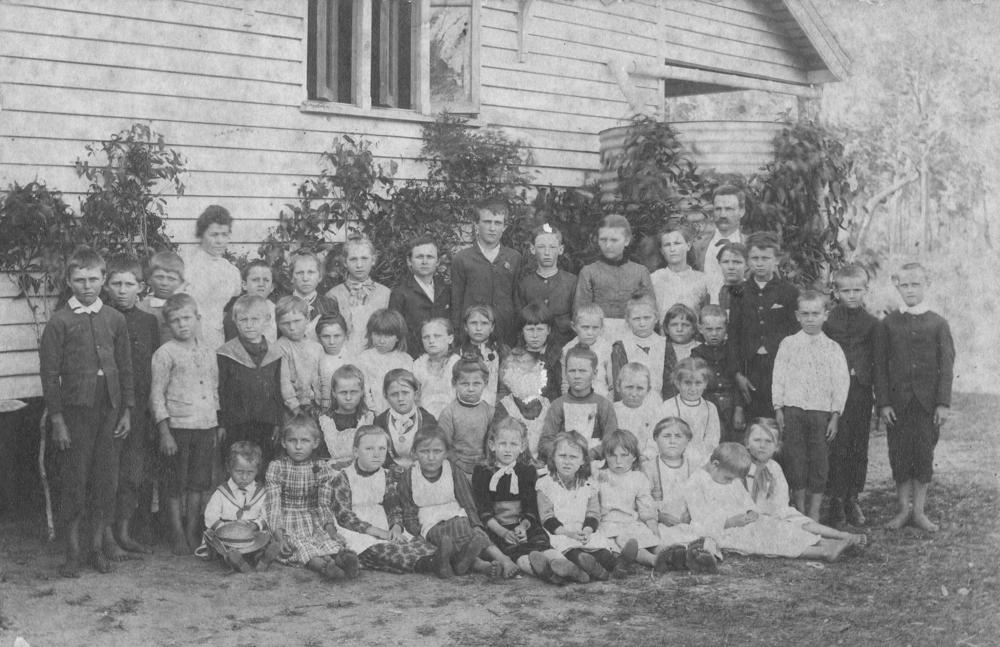
Alberton State School and students, circa 1892

The Aboriginal name for the area was Wobbomerijee (where Wobum means mud and Mudtheri means sticky).

European settlement began in 1863 when the first settlers arrived, mostly German immigrants.

A town reserve was established in 1865 on the southern bank near the junction of the Logan and Albert Rivers.

The Ageston sugar plantation and sugar mill operated from 1866 to the 1890s and was described as "one of the finest plants in the Moreton district" in 1873.

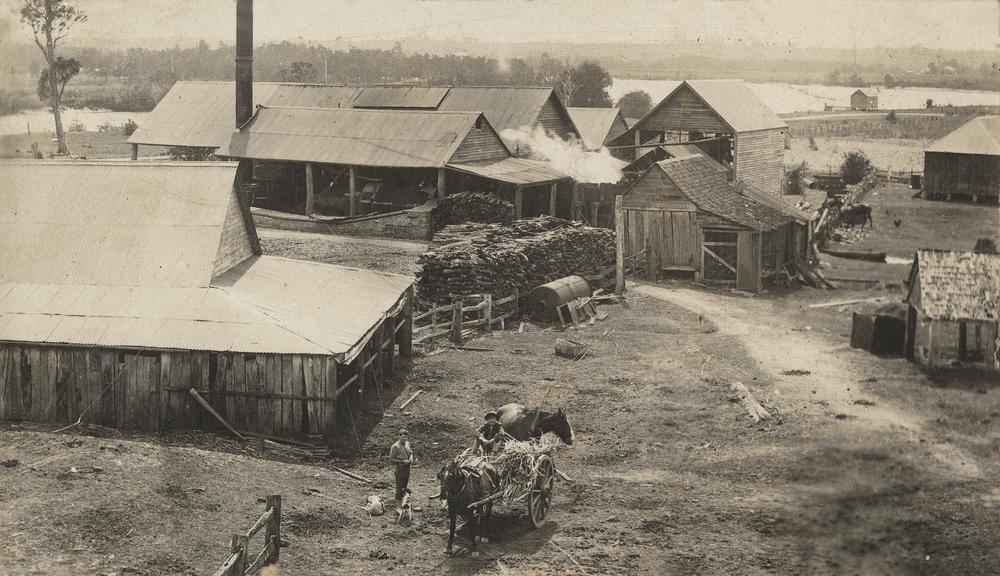
Alberton Sugar Mill, 1922

In 1869, the first Lutheran church was established near the Lutheran cemetery on Zipfs Road. The area was known as Elkana (meaning "God has created and blessed"). A German school was established early in the 1870s beside the church. In 1886, a new larger Lutheran church (the present St Peter's) was built. It was consecrated in 1887 by Rev Hellmuth. The German school was demolished in 1919.

Later the area was called Alberton after Prince Albert, consort to Queen Victoria, but the name Elkana is preserved in Elkana Road.

The Alberton Ferry was established 1870 to cross the Logan River between Ferry Road at Carbrook and Alberton Road at Alberton (27.6937°S 153.2611°E). Following the opening of the Logan Bridge in 1931, usage of the ferry declined and it was closed in 1948.

The Alberton Provisional School opened on 13 May 1876 with children attending German school on only one day a week. On 13 October 1884 the provisional school became the Alberton State School. It closed in 1966. It was on a 10-acre (4.0 ha) site at 88 Alberton Road (corner of Zipfs Road, 27.7109°S 153.2596°E).

In October 1886, a well-known property on the Albert River owned by W. K. Witty called "Yellowwood Estate" was advertised for subdivision into suitable sized farms and then auctioned by Simon Fraser & Son. A map advertising the auction states that 40 choice farms were available and the auction was to be held on Saturday 27 November at the Palm's Hotel, Beenleigh.

The Gem Hotel was established in 1877 but it was destroyed by fire on 27 June 1933 but was insured. By December 1933, the hotel had been rebuilt.

In the 1950s, a very notable Bora ceremonial site on the Logan river was destroyed, and replaced with a pineapple plantation owned by a Mr Inklemann. The site bore the characteristics of the classic twin circles, with a north-south orientation, the large northern ring measuring 70–80 feet in diameter, while the smaller ring lay some 100 feet to its south. In the middle of the latter was a native stone hut, consisting of several stone slabs supporting a stone roof, not unlike the dolmen structures of prehistoric Europe.

In September 2012, an archaeological dig was undertaken on the former Ageston sugar plantation, revealing stone and steel structures, a Cornish boiler and evaporating pans.

== Demographics ==
In the 2011 census, Alberton had a population of 576 people.

In the 2016 census, Alberton had a population of 590 people.

In the 2021 census, Alberton had a population of 547 people.

== Economy ==
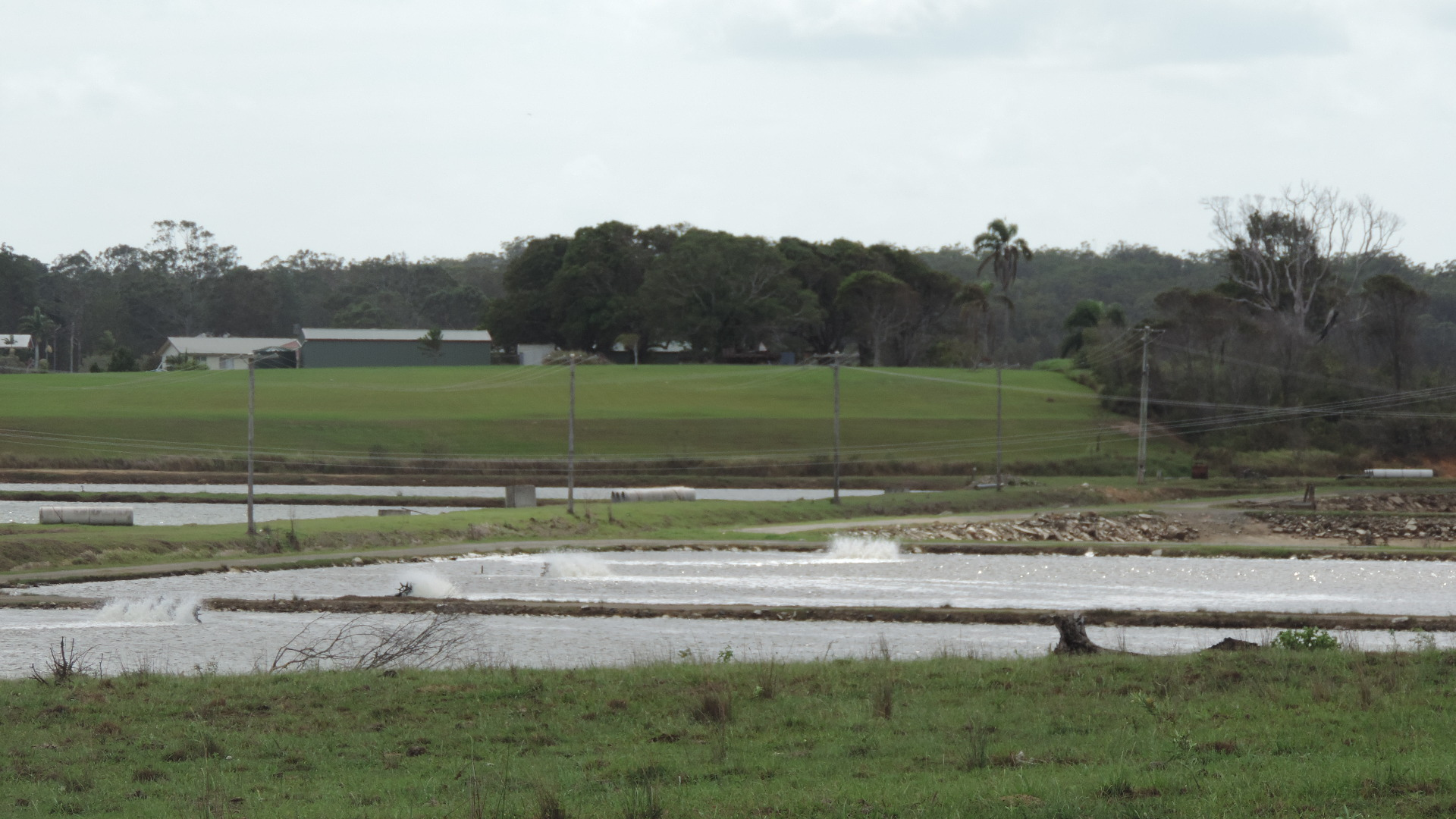
Prawn farming, Alberton, 2014

Alberton is primarily a rural area with sugar cane plantations and prawn farms.

== Education ==
There are no schools in Alberton. The nearest government primary schools are Woongoolba State School in neighbouring Woongoolba to the south-east and Mount Warren Park State School in Mount Warren Park to the south-west. The nearest government secondary school is Beenleigh State High School in Beenleigh to the south-west.

== Facilities ==
AIberton Cemetery is at 80 Zipfs Road (27.7116°S 153.2662°E). Established by the German settlers, it is now operated by the Gold Coast City Council.

== Amenities ==
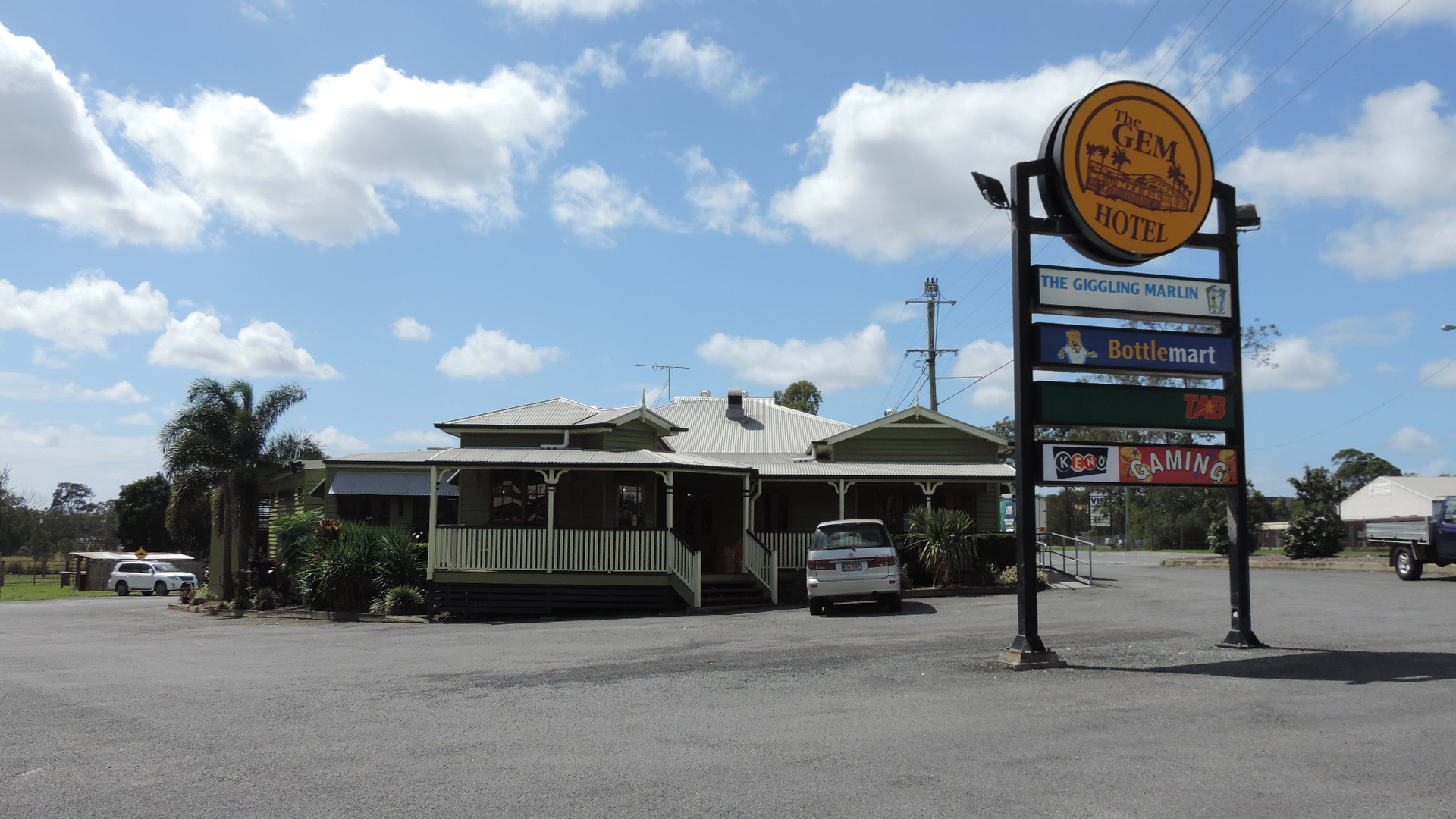
The Gem Hotel, 2014

The Gem Hotel is on the corner of Stapylton-Jacobs Well Road and Rotary Park Road (27.7207°S 153.2523°E).

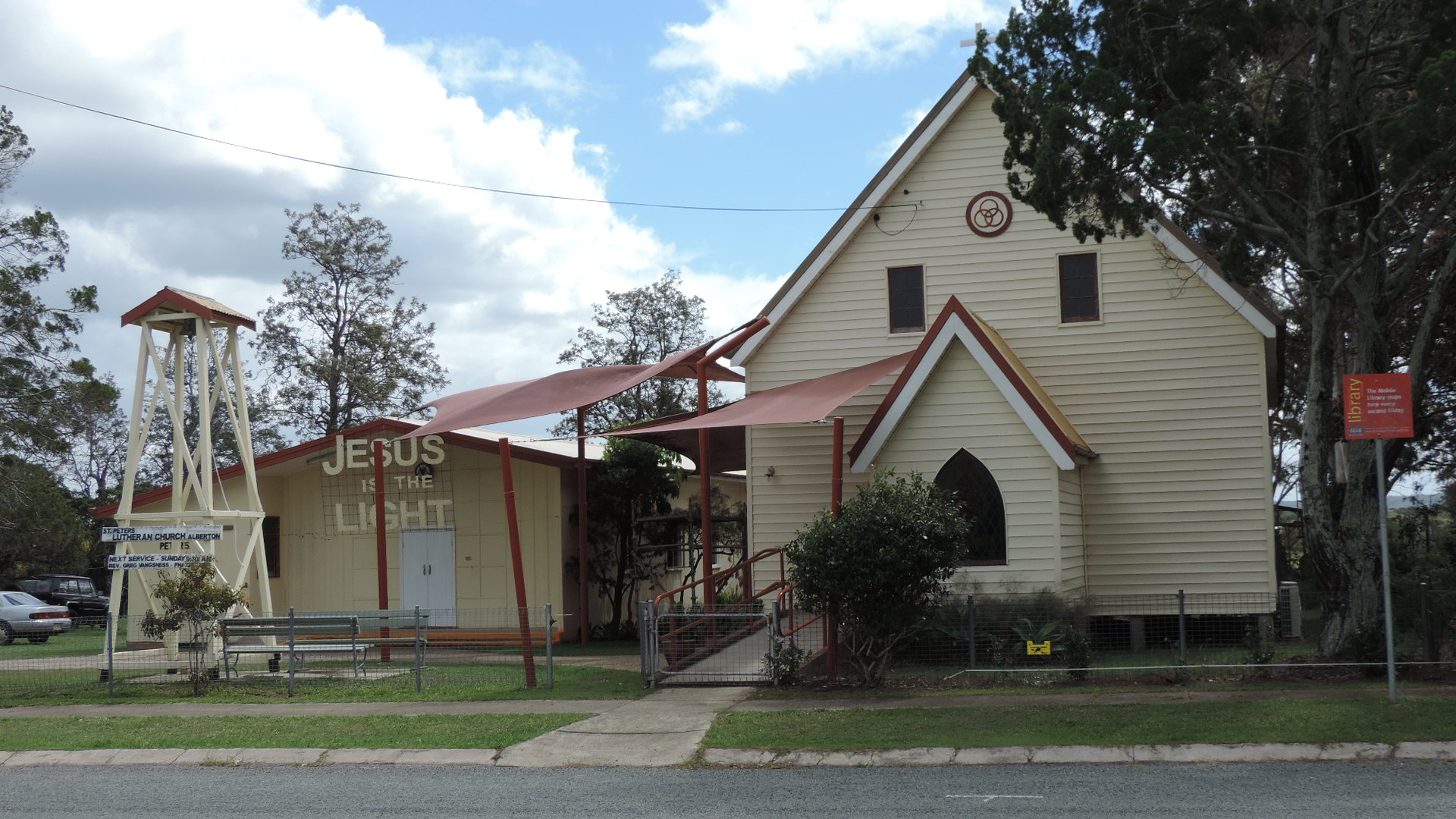
St Peter's Lutheran Church, Alberton, 2014

St Peter's Lutheran Church is at 187 Alberton Road (27.7031°S 153.2566°E).

The Gold Coast City Council operates a fortnightly mobile library service which visits St Peter's Lutheran Hall in Alberton Road.

Alberton Cricket Club is in Zipf Park at 88 Alberton Road (27.7115°S 153.2595°E).

There is a boat ramp at the northern end of Alberton Road on the south bank of Logan River (27.6937°S 153.2608°E). It is managed by the Gold Coast City Council.

There are a number of parks in the area:

- Alberton Park (27.7054°S 153.2586°E)
- August Burow Park (27.6954°S 153.2598°E)
- Beitz Park (27.6968°S 153.2785°E)
- Woolshed Parklands (27.7180°S 153.2543°E)
- Zipfs Park (27.7110°S 153.2597°E)
