= Logan River =

Logan
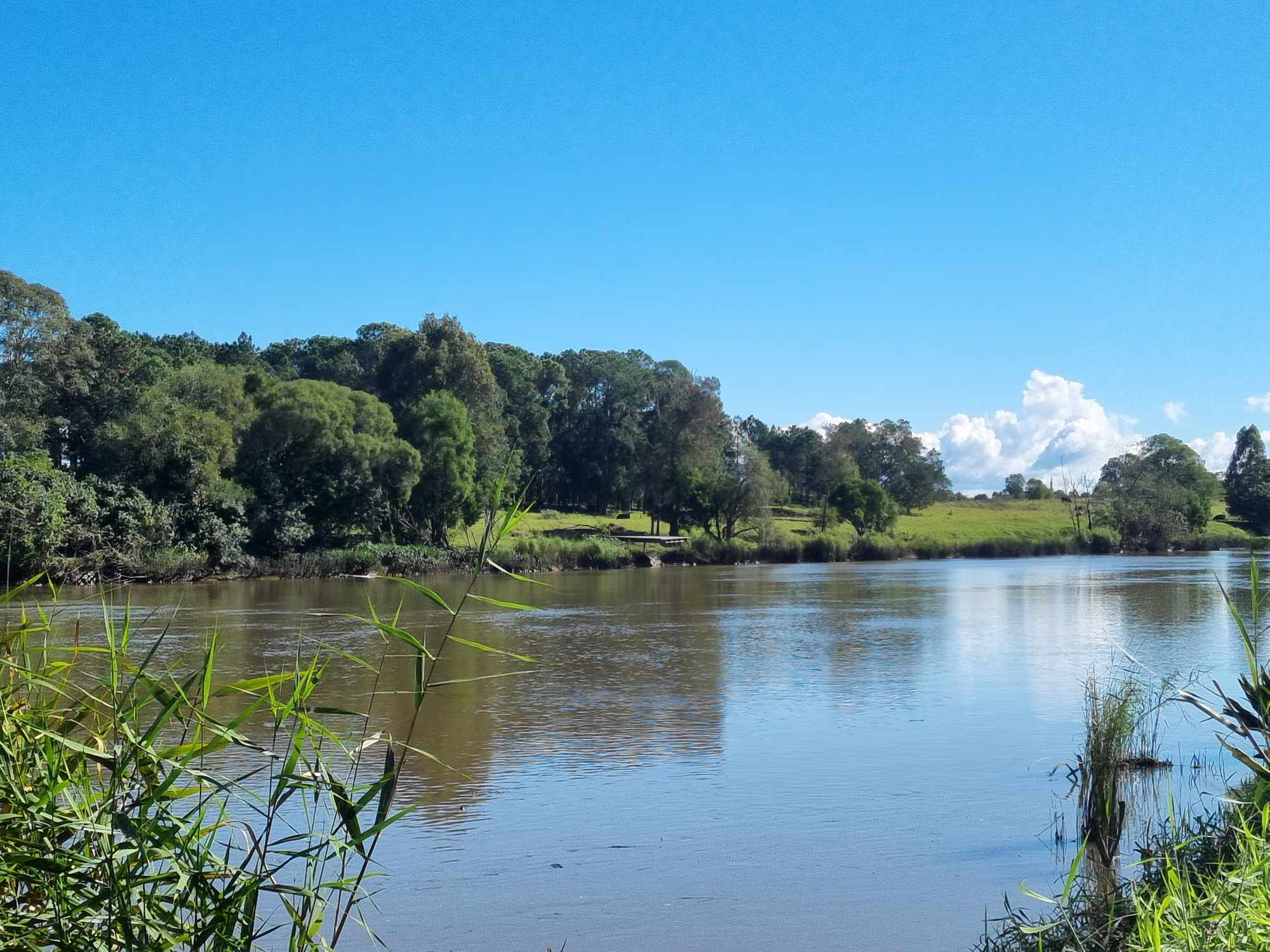
- The Logan River from Tansey Park, Tanah Merah looking toward Bethania, 2025

- Location of the Logan River mouth in Queensland
- Etymology: Captain Patrick Logan
- Native name: Dugulumba (Minjungbal)

Location
- Country: Australia
- State: Queensland
- Region: South East Queensland
- Local government areas: Scenic Rim Region, City of Logan, City of Gold Coast
- Cities: Beaudesert, Logan City

Physical characteristics
- Source: Scenic Rim
  - location: below Mount Ernest
  - coordinates: 28°19′40″S 152°42′55″E
  - elevation: 380 m (1,250 ft)
- Mouth: Moreton Bay
  - location: east of Alberton
  - coordinates: 27°41′40″S 153°20′43″E
  - elevation: 0 m (0 ft)
- Length: 184 km (114 mi)
- Basin size: 3,076 km^{2} (1,188 sq mi)

Basin features
- Tributaries
  - left: Mount Barney Creek, Burnett Creek, Tamrookum Creek, Knapps Creek (Queensland), Sandy Creek (Queensland), Allan Creek, Teviot Brook, Flagstone Creek (Queensland)
  - right: Running Creek, Oaky Creek (Queensland), Christmas Creek (Queensland), Albert River
- National park: Mount Barney National Park

The Logan River (Yugambeh: Dugulumba) is a perennial river in the Scenic Rim, Logan and Gold Coast local government areas of the South East region of Queensland, Australia. The 184-kilometre (114 mi)-long river is one of the dominant waterways in South East Queensland that drains the southern ranges of the Scenic Rim and empties into Moreton Bay after navigating the City of Logan, a major suburban centre located south of Brisbane. The catchment is dominated by urban and agricultural land use. Near the river mouth are mangrove forests and a number of aquaculture farms.

== Course and features ==
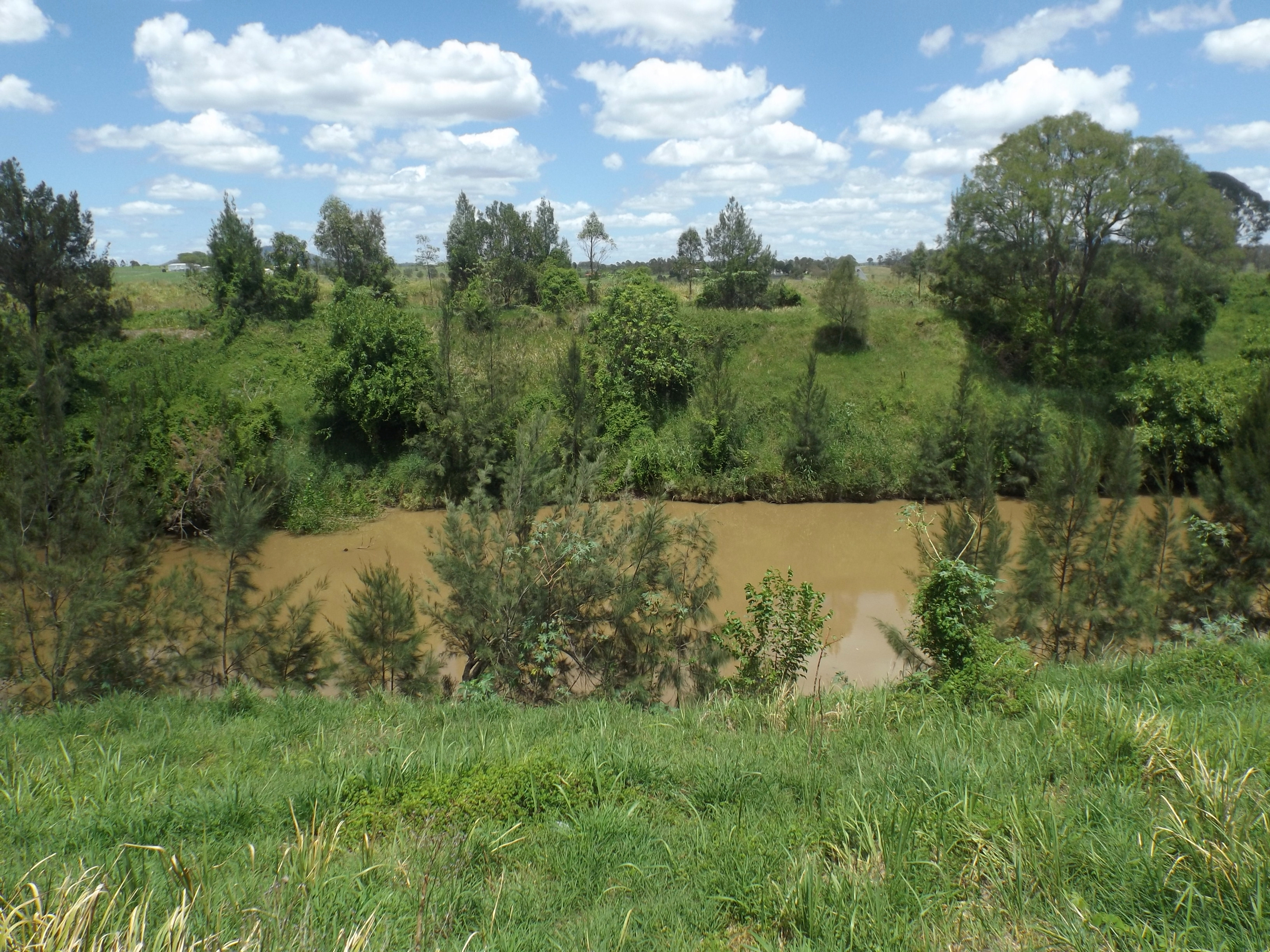
Woodhill, 2016

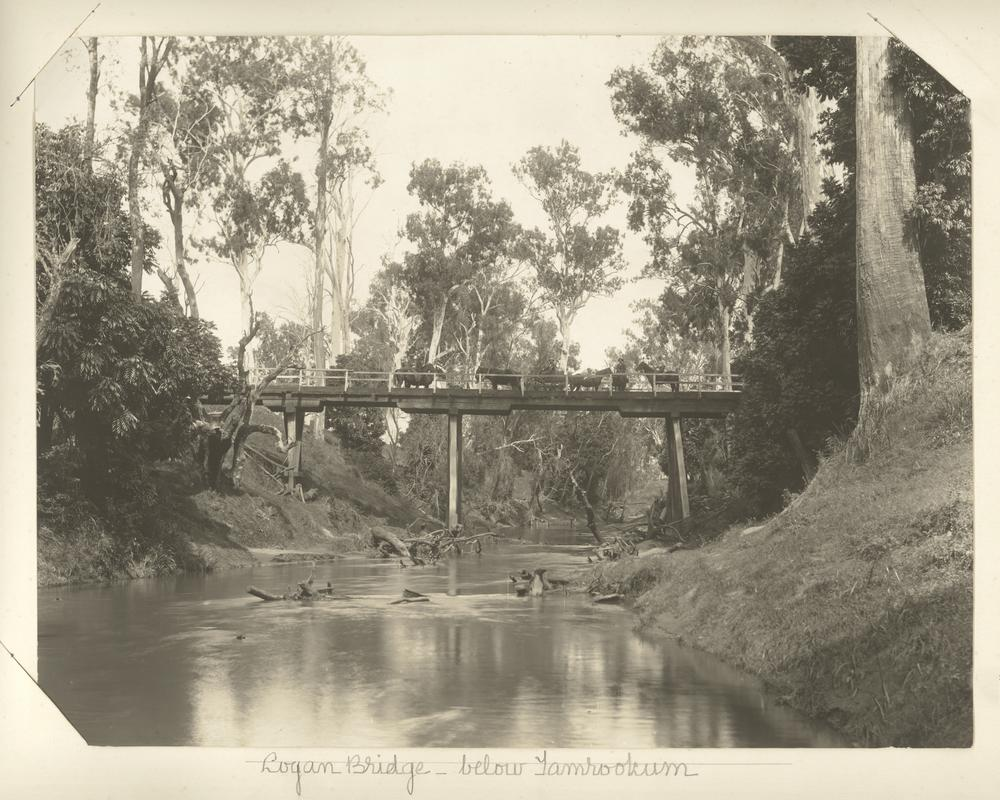
Logan Bridge below Tamrookum, 1903

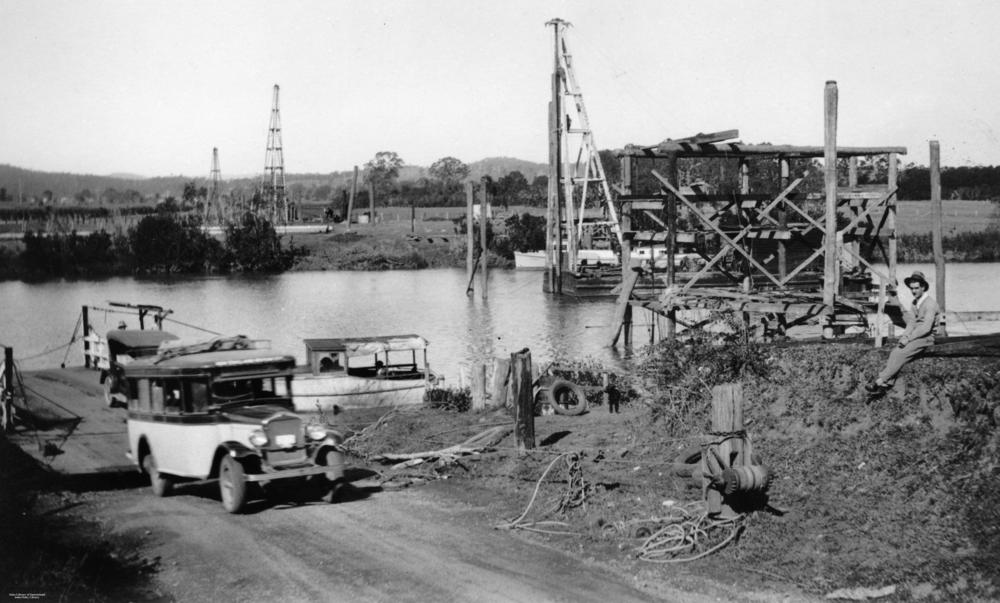
Bridge construction on the Logan River, 1930

The river rises below Mount Ernest on the southern slopes of the Scenic Rim, part of the Great Dividing Range and forms in the Mount Barney National Park, near the Queensland – New South Wales border, below Mount Lindesay. The river flows generally north by northeast, joined by eleven minor tributaries, before heading east and eventually emptying into Moreton Bay. Its principal tributaries are the Albert River which joins it just east of Beenleigh; Teviot Brook which begins at Mount Superbus and joins the Logan River at Cedar Pocket; and Burnett Creek which is subverted by the Maroon Dam west of Rathdowney. The river descends 380 metres (1,250 ft) over its 184-kilometre (114 mi) course.

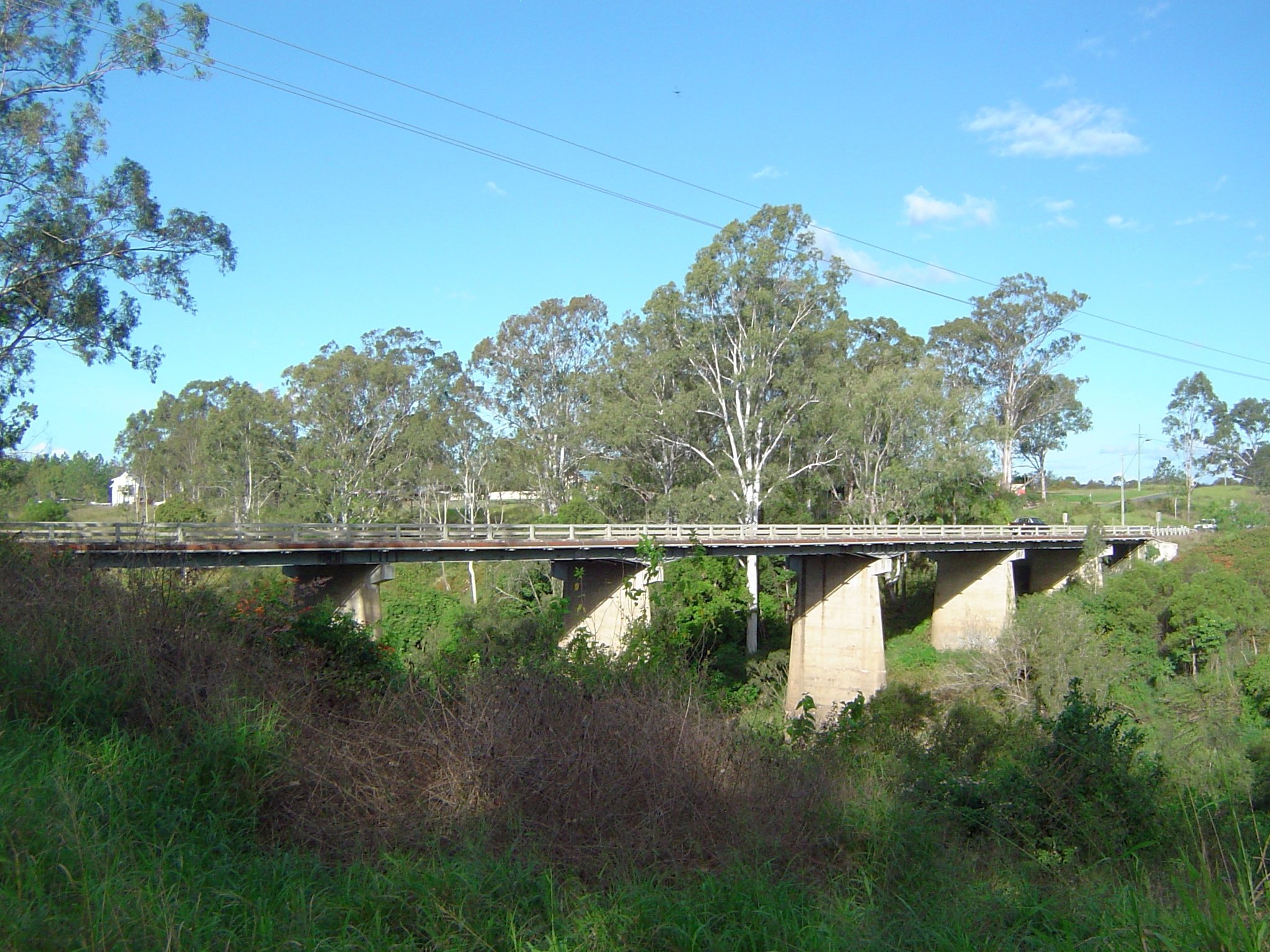
The Mount Lindesay Highway via the Maclean Bridge at North Maclean, 2014

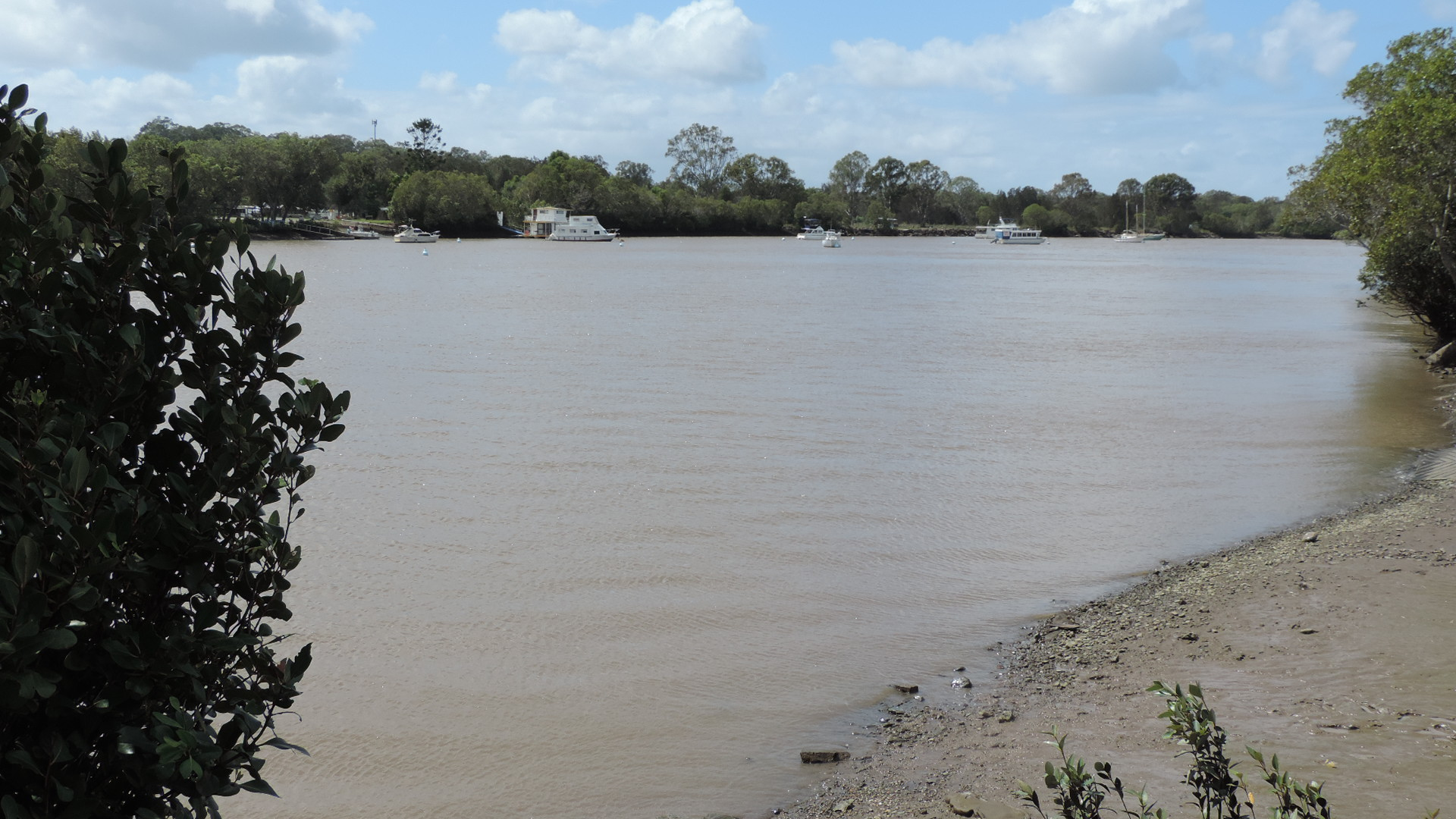
Logan River at Carbrook (left) and Alberton (right), 2014

In addition to the Scenic Rim, the Logan and its tributaries drain more than 3,000 square kilometres (1,200 sq mi) including the northern parts of the Border Ranges, the western slopes of the McPherson Range and the eastern slopes of the Main Range. The river's upper catchment is heavily influenced by the national parks of Tamborine, Mount Barney, Moogerah Peaks, Main Range and the Lamington Plateau, and numerous local government-owned reserves and conservation areas, that comprise part of the Shield Volcano Group of the UNESCO World Heritage Site Gondwana Rainforests of Australia.

The river is crossed by the Mount Lindesay Highway near Rathdowney and at North Maclean via Maclean's Bridge. The river is also crossed by the Pacific Motorway and the Old Pacific Highway south of Loganholme. The Beenleigh railway line crosses the Logan between Loganlea and Bethania. A second rail crossing is planned to accommodate a doubling of rail tracks between the Kuraby and Beenleigh in time for the 2032 Brisbane Olympics. Tidal waters reach to just downstream of the Maclean's Bridge.

== Water harvesting ==
Maroon Dam subverts Burnnett Creek, and supplies water to the Beaudesert Shire. Maroon is managed by SunWater and covers approximately 106 square kilometres (41 sq mi). The Queensland Government has considered several projects to supply water to its Southern Regional Pipeline. The Bromelton off-stream storage facility is under construction on the Logan River, outside Beaudesert, as is the Cedar Grove Weir, near Jimboomba. In 2006 the Queensland Government decided against the construction of a Logan River dam at Tilley's Bridge in Rathdowney due to mounting public pressure and high road diversion costs. Instead, the Wyaralong Dam was proposed on Teviot Brook near Boonah which will inundate fifteen properties instead of the one hundred properties for the Tilley's Bridge site. The Tilley's Bridge dam, if it had been approved, would have inundated the area of land between Tilley's Bridge, just to the south of Rathdowney, and Bigriggan Camping Reserve (28.1986°S 152.7799°E), some 8 kilometres (5.0 mi) west, covering a significant section of the Boonah-Rathdowney Road.

== History ==
The Yugambeh clan of the Jagera people are thought to have once roamed throughout the catchment. Traditional owners in the catchment made use of the abundant natural resources, various plants and animals were used as staple foods as the seasons changed and as new food sources became available. They called the river Dugulumba in their traditional Yugambeh dialect of the Bandjalang language. Yugembah (also known as Yugumbir, Jugambel, Jugambeir, Jugumbir, Jukam, Jukamba) is one of the Australian Aboriginal languages in areas that include the Beenleigh, Beaudesert, Gold Coast, Logan, Scenic Rim, Albert River, Coolangatta, Coomera, Logan River, Pimpama, Tamborine and Tweed River Valley, within the local government boundaries of the City of Gold Coast, City of Logan, Scenic Rim Regional Council and the Tweed River Valley.

Mununjali (also known as Mananjahli, Manaldjahli and Manandjali) is a dialect of the Yugambeh language. The Mununjali language area includes landscape within the local government boundaries of the Scenic Rim and Beaudesert Shire Councils.

In August 1826 Captain Patrick Logan was the first European to discover the river. Logan initially named the river the Darling River, but to avoid confusion, Governor Ralph Darling ordered the name be changed to honour its discoverer. A run at Bromelton was the first property along the river to be settled in 1842 by Hugh Henry Robertson. By 1850 the property had transferred hands to Thomas Lodge Murray-Prior. Rosa Campbell Praed, one of Queensland's first novelists spent time at the property and wrote about station life in detail in a 1902 book titled My Australian Girlhood.

Boat traffic was thriving along the river by the 1860s mostly because it was the best transport route in the area. Steam ships, cutters and hand-loaded punts were the most common vessels.

For navigation purposes the river was surveyed in 1871 from its mouth upstream to McLean. Wharfs were initially built at McLean, Beenleigh, Waterford and Logan Village with more built due to public demand. Unofficial ferry crossings were conducted as early as 1862. Long-term services were established at Alberton, Loganholme and Waterford. The rail bridge at Loganlea was operating in 1885 only to be demolished two years later during floods. A new bridge opened in 1888 and lasted until 1972 when another bridge was built.

In 1905, a 12 ft 7 in (3.84 m) saltwater crocodile was found shot dead floating near the ferry by banks of the river. The find was preceded by reports of sightings for several years which were met with scepticism because southern Queensland is well south of their natural distribution.

A toll bridge on the river north of Beenleigh was opened and began collecting tolls in 1931, as weekend traffic between Brisbane and the Gold Coast increased.

The worst flooding in the lower reaches of the river in the 20th century occurred during the 1974 Brisbane flood.

== Water quality and conservation ==
Running Creek near Andrew Drynan Park at Running Creek, 2016

The quality of the water in the Logan River is very turbid. The annual Healthy Waterways Report Card for the waterways and catchments of South East Queensland in 2007 rated the condition of the Logan River as very poor. Much of the environmental degradation has been caused by land clearing, the Bromelton Industrial Estate, nutrient run-off, and pumping wastewater directly from several wastewater treatment plants in and around the Logan River. In 2009, the Healthy Waterways Ecosystem Health Monitoring Program rated the River's freshwater area at a "D"; its Estuarine area was given an "F". Historically, cholera has been found in the Logan River from around 1977. Community projects in the Logan catchment area aim to improve the quality of the ecosystem. Competitions such as Carp-busters are aimed at reducing the number of carp and hence allowing native species of fish a better chance of survival.

== See also ==
- List of rivers of Australia § Queensland
