= Woongoolba, Queensland =

Woongoolba
- Suburb
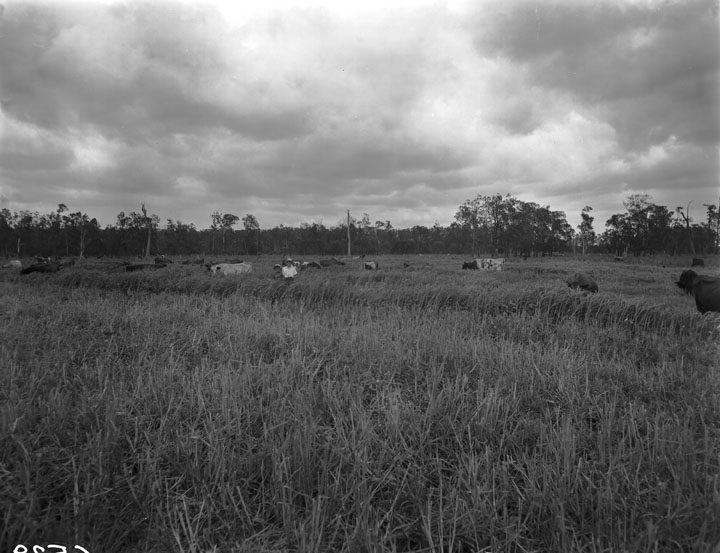
- Cattle grazing, Woongoolba, 1956

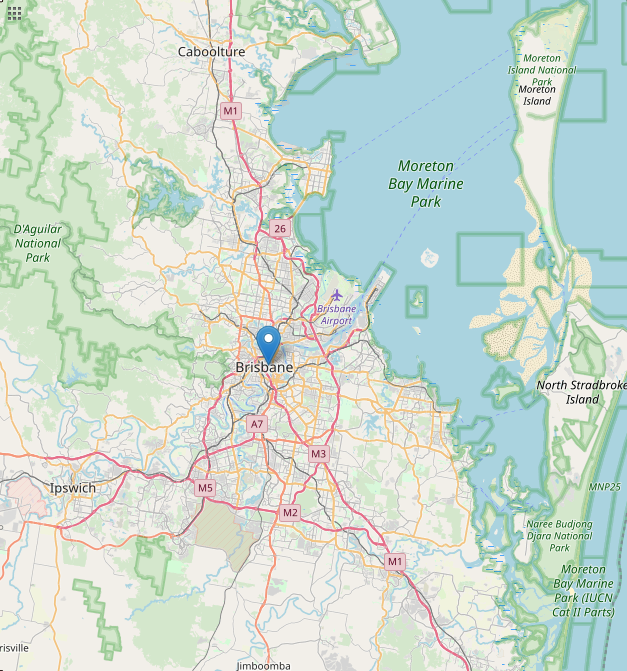
- Interactive map of Woongoolba
- Coordinates: 27.7277°S 153.3147°E
- Country: Australia
- State: Queensland
- City: Gold Coast
- LGA: City of Gold Coast
- Location: 8.2 km (5.1 mi) NE of Ormeau; 16.7 km (10.4 mi) E of Beenleigh; 36.5 km (22.7 mi) N of Southport; 39.5 km (24.5 mi) N of Surfers Paradise; 49.4 km (30.7 mi) SE of Brisbane CBD

Government
  - State electorate: Coomera
  - Federal division: Fadden

Area
  - Total: 32.5 km^{2} (12.5 sq mi)

Population
  - Total: 282 (2021 census)
  - Density: 8.677/km^{2} (22.47/sq mi)
- Time zone: UTC+10:00 (AEST)
- Postcode: 4207
Suburbs around Woongoolba
Alberton	Carbrook	Redland Bay
Gilberton	Woongoolba	Steiglitz
Norwell	Norwell	Jacobs Well

Woongoolba is a coastal rural locality in the northern part of City of Gold Coast, Queensland, Australia. In the 2021 census, Woongoolba had a population of 282 people.

== Geography ==
The locality is bounded to the north by the Logan River (27.6958°S 153.3408°E) and to the north-east by Moreton Bay.

Little Rocky Point is a headland jutting into Moreton Bay (27.7122°S 153.3561°E).

The land is low-lying (less than 10 metres above sea level) with only three places higher than this in the locality:

- Marks Hill (27.7099°S 153.3318°E) rising to 20 metres (66 ft) in the north-east of the locality, close to the mouth of the Logan River
- immediately inland of Little Rocky Point
- Cecil Zipf Park along the coast

The land is predominantly used for growing sugarcane except for the north-east of the locality which is used for aquaculture, mostly prawns. Parts of the north-east of the locality are marshland and undeveloped.

== History ==
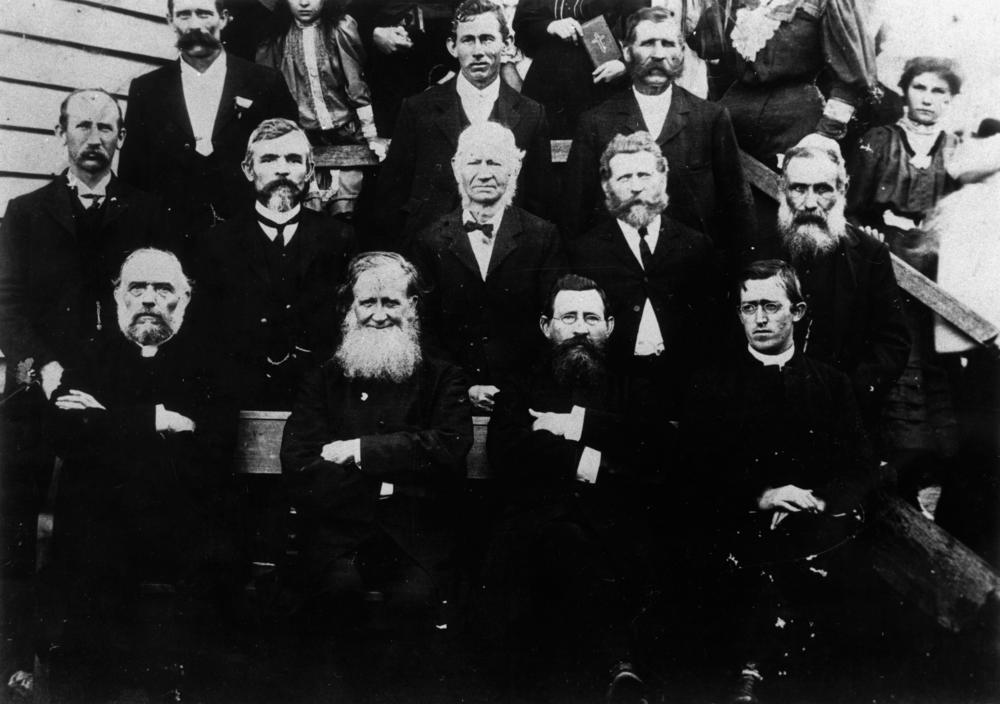
Bethlehem Lutheran Church gathering, Pimpama Island (Carl Heinrich Heck is centre of the middle row)

In the late 1800s, the farming district located between the Pimpama River and the Logan River called Pimpama Island and encompasses the modern localities of Jacobs Well, Norwell, Steiglitz and Woongoolba. It was referred to as an island because there were a number of lagoons and swamps that isolated the area during the wet season; however, this disadvantage made it good land for growing sugar cane.

The name Woongoolba is believed to be an Aboriginal word for the geebung tree.

The district was predominantly settled by German immigrants who arrived in the period 1864–1900.

The Pimpama Island Provisional School opened on 17 April 1876 under the direction of teacher Joseph Schindler with 13 pupils (of German parentage). It became Pimpama Island State School on 7 September 1898. It was renamed Woongoolba State School in 1930. Additional classrooms and a library were built in 1941, with further expansions in 1991, 1997 and 2010.

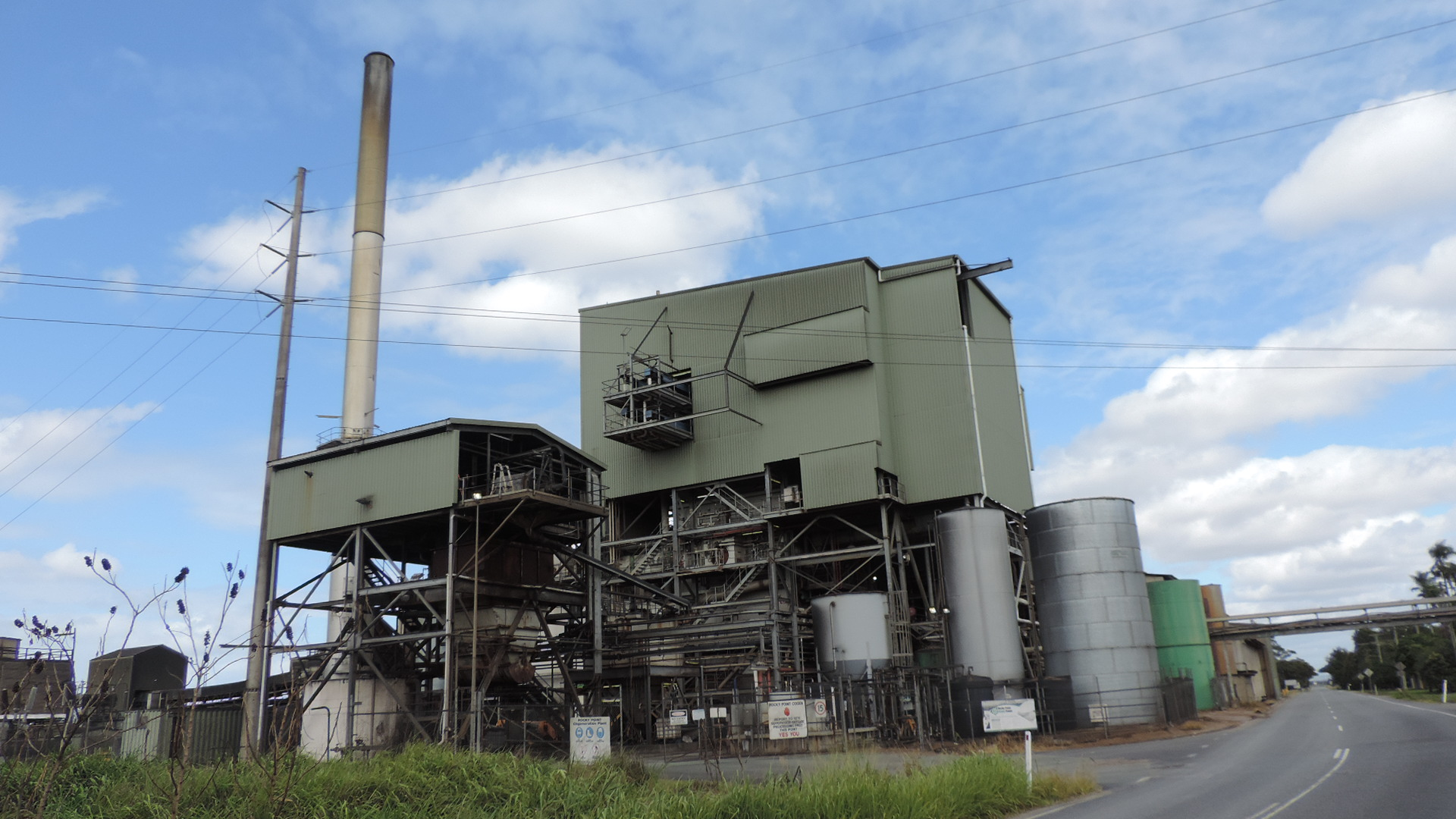
Rocky Point Sugar Mill, Woongoolba and Steiglitz, 2014

The Rocky Point Sugar Mill was established by Carl Heinrich Heck in 1878 on Mill Road (and crosses the boundary between Woongoolba and Steiglitz). Despite being one of the oldest sugar mills in Australia, it is still privately owned by the Heck Group. There were once other sugar mills in the area, but they have now closed and Rocky Point has expanded to replace their lost capacity.

The first Bethlehem Lutheran church was built in 1882. It was replaced by the current building in 1908, which was renovated in 1930.

On Friday 13 July 1917, the Pimpama Island Public Hall was officially opened by James Stodart, the Member of the Queensland Legislative Assembly for Logan. In the 1970s or 1980s, the original Norwell State School building was relocated to the site and used to extend the hall.

In December 2016, the prawn industry in Woongoolba was disrupted by an outbreak of white spot virus. The disease was found in imported prawns in June 2016, and it is believed that recreational fishermen used these imported prawns as bait in the Logan River (from where the prawn industry draws its water), introducing the disease into the prawn farms. In 2021, one prawn farming company initiated legal action for damages of over $44 million against the prawn importing companies and the Australian Government for their role in this biosecurity failure. In 2021, submissions were made to the Australian Government to require imported prawns to be cooked rather than raw (which would kill the white spot disease and hopefully minimise biosecurity risk of other diseases).

in July 2019 the Heck family homestead "‘Friedensheim" (House of Peace), then at 129 Mill Road, opposite the Rocky Point Sugar Mill (27.7345°S 153.3263°E), was divided into three pieces and relocated to the Beenleigh Historical Village, an open-air museum. Following work to reconstruct and restore the building, it was officially reopened in November 2021 at the museum. The homestead was built in 1914 for the Heck family who operated the sugar mill but had not been used as a home since the 1970s.

== Demographics ==
In the 2011 census, Woongoolba had a population of 460 people.

In the 2016 census, Woongoolba had a population of 280 people.

In the 2021 census, Woongoolba had a population of 282 people.

== Education ==
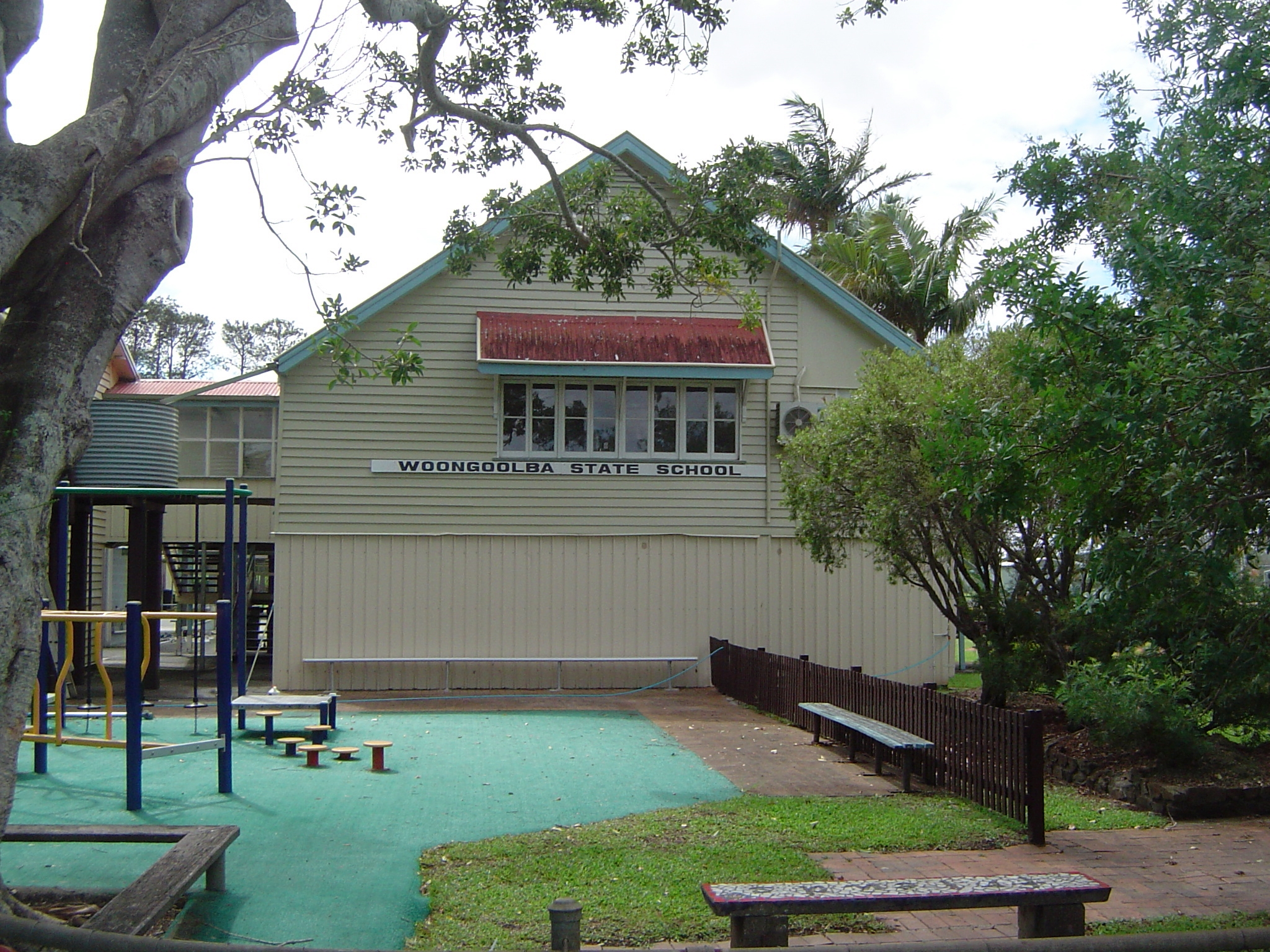
Woongoolba state school, 2014

Woongoolba State School is a government primary (Prep-6) school for boys and girls at 1219 Jacobs Well Road (27.7451°S 153.3193°E). In 2018, the school had an enrolment of 224 students with 20 teachers (13 full-time equivalent) and 11 non-teaching staff (8 full-time equivalent).

There are no secondary schools in Woongoolba. The nearest government secondary schools are Ormeau Woods State High School in Ormeau to the south-west and Beenleigh State High School in Beenleigh to the west.

== Amenities ==
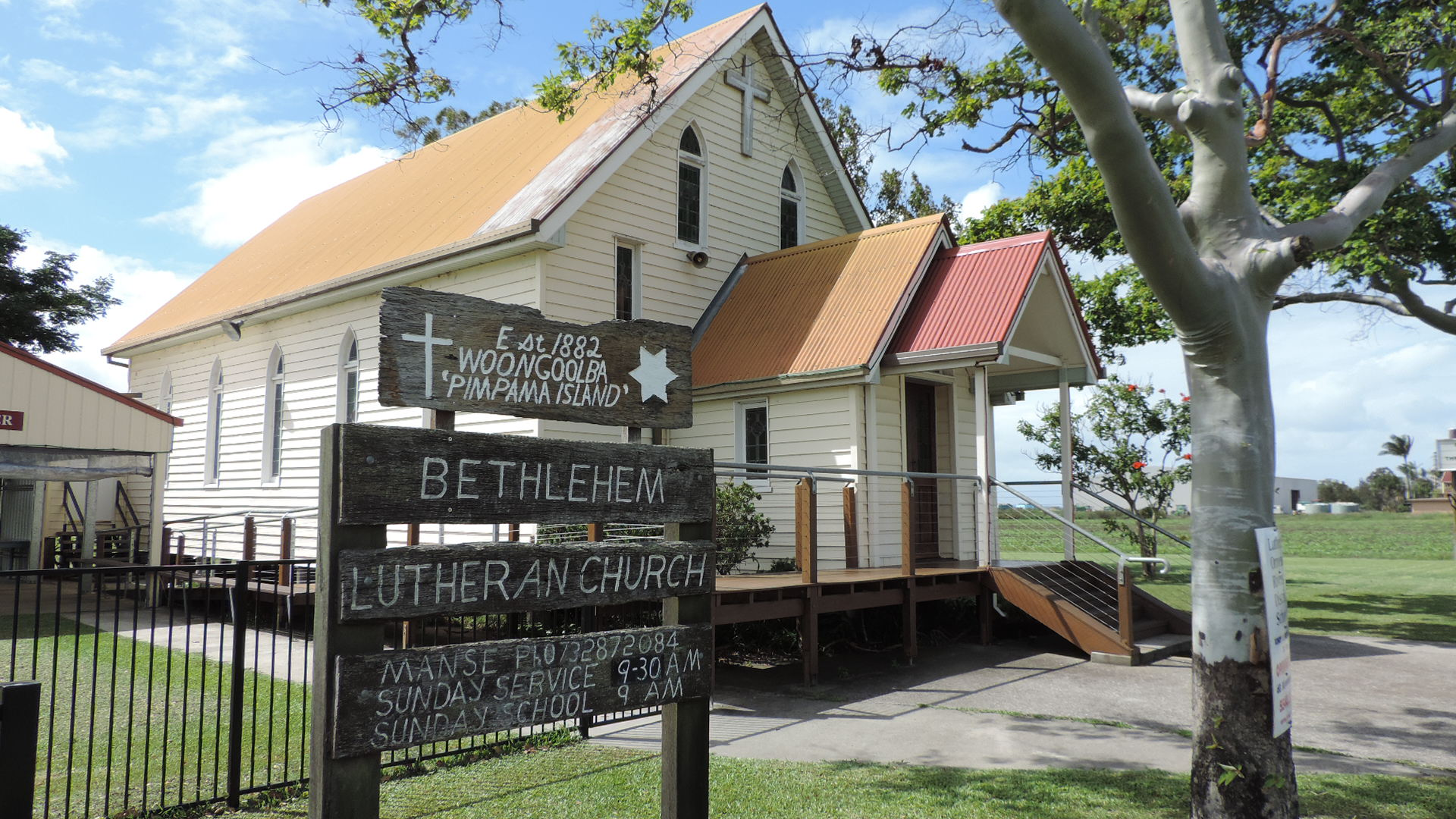
Bethlehem Lutheran Church, Woongoolba, 2014

The Gold Coast City Council operates a fortnightly mobile library service which visits Woongoolba State School on Jacobs Well Road.

Bethlehem Lutheran Church is at 1281 Stapylton Jacobs Well Road (27.7459°S 153.3258°E).

Woongoolba Public Hall (also known as Pimpama Island & Districts Community Centre) is at 1226 Stapylton Jacobs Well Road (27.7457°S 153.3201°E).

Accessed via a causeway through the mangroves, the Cecil Zipf Park at Little Rocky Point (27.7166°S 153.3537°E) offers views of Moreton Bay, off-leash dog area, BBQ and toilets. The beach below the park is a good place for fishing, especially for bream.

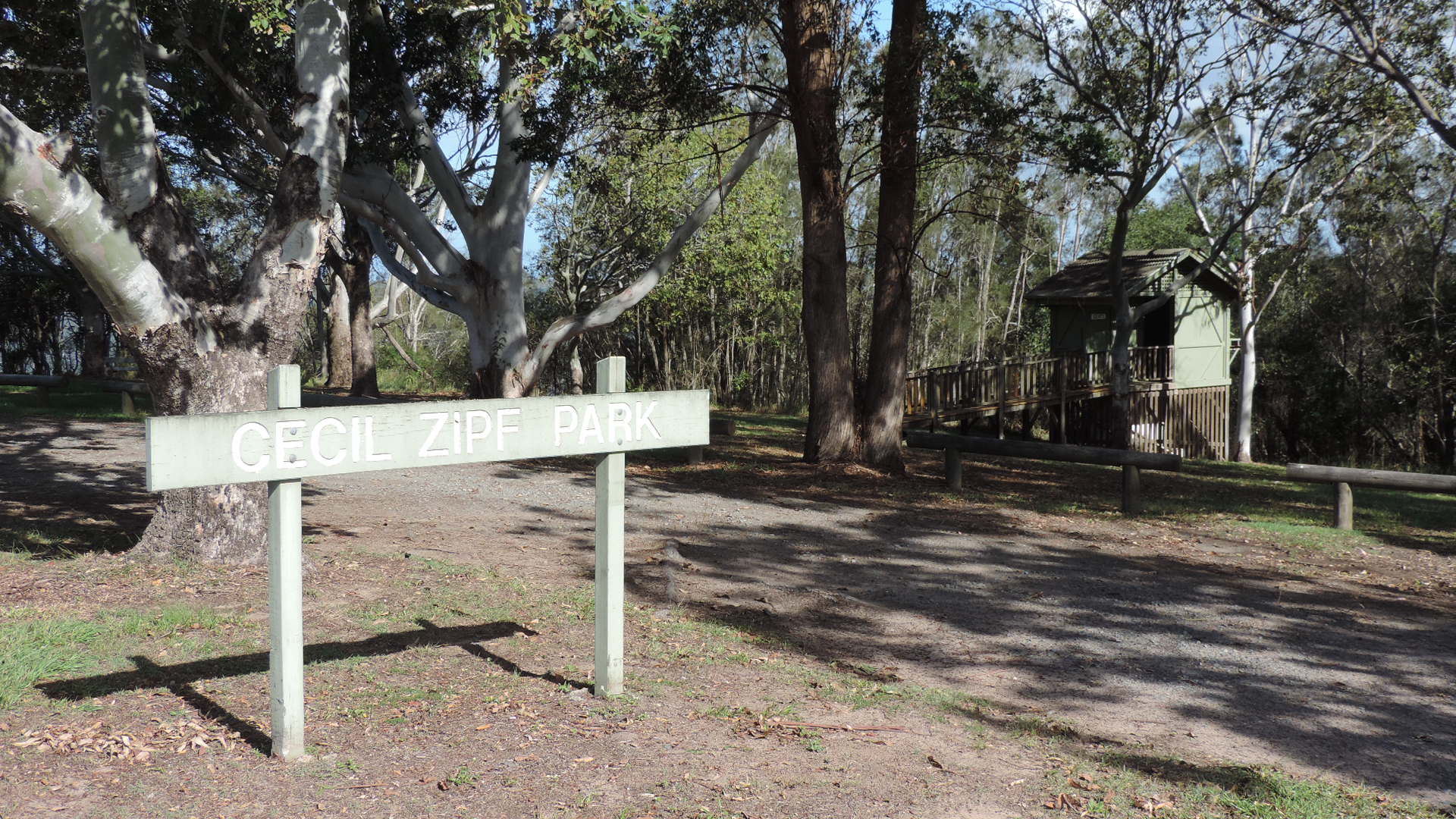
Cecil Zipf Park, 2014

There are a number of other parks in the locality, including:

- Behm Creek Reserve (27.7633°S 153.3310°E)
- Loves Road Weir (27.7164°S 153.3023°E)
- New Norwell Rd Reserve (27.7585°S 153.3134°E)
- Norwell Reserve (27.7560°S 153.3028°E)
- Pimpama Island Recreational Reserve (27.7383°S 153.3050°E)
- Rocky Point Reserve (27.7120°S 153.3412°E)
- Sandy Creek Park (27.7141°S 153.3008°E)
