= Ormeau Hills, Queensland =

Ormeau Hills
- Suburb
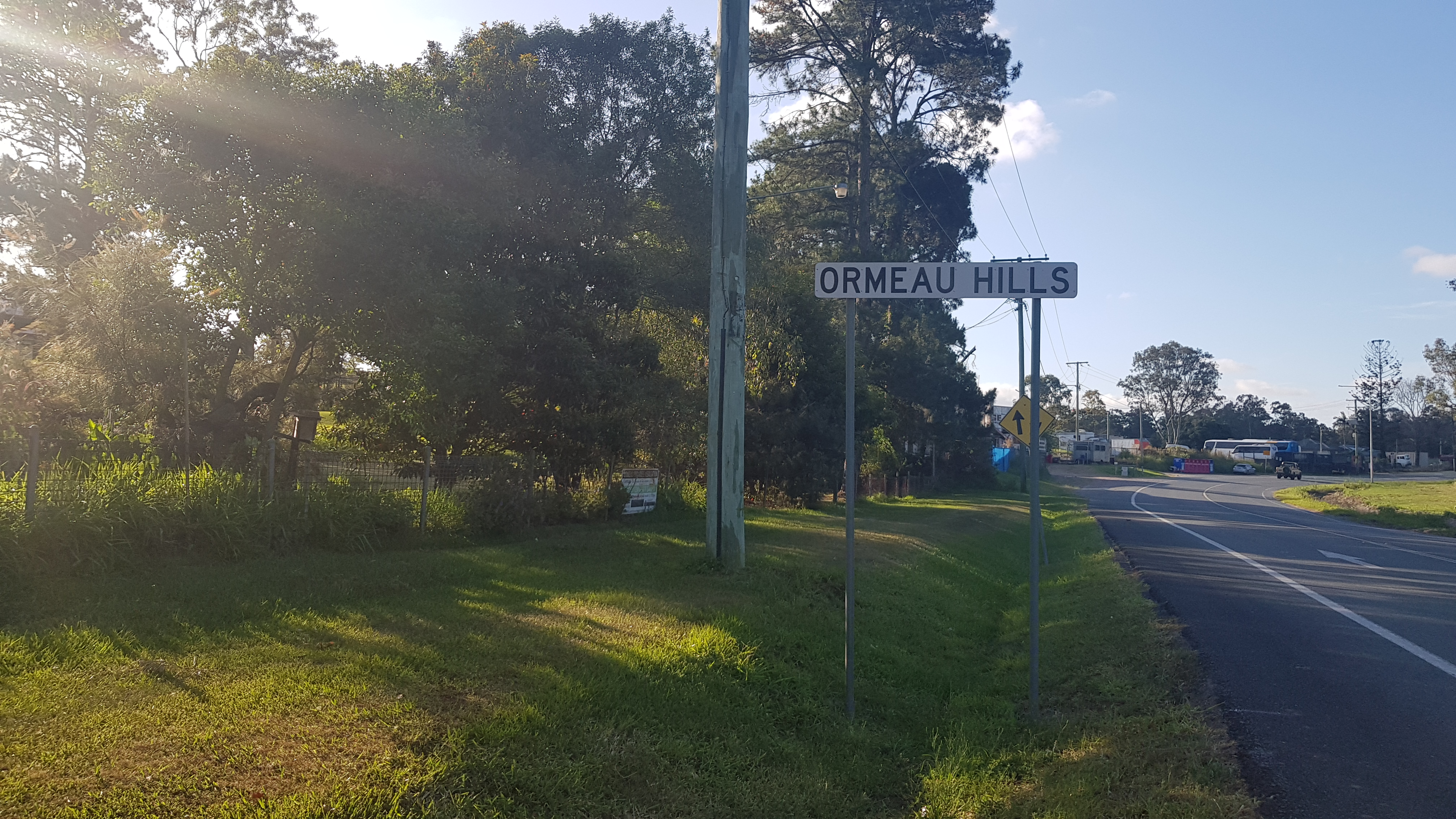
- Tillyroen Road, 2022

- Interactive map of Ormeau Hills
- Coordinates: 27.7988°S 153.2366°E
- Country: Australia
- State: Queensland
- City: Gold Coast City
- LGA: City of Gold Coast
- Location: 34.9 km (21.7 mi) NNW of Southport; 37.2 km (23.1 mi) NNW of Surfers Paradise; 52.0 km (32.3 mi) SSE of Brisbane CBD

Government
  - State electorate: Coomera
  - Federal division: Forde

Area
  - Total: 8.5 km^{2} (3.3 sq mi)

Population
  - Total: 4,521 (2021 census)
  - Density: 532/km^{2} (1,378/sq mi)
- Time zone: UTC+10:00 (AEST)
- Postcode: 4208
Suburbs around Ormeau Hills
Luscombe	Ormeau	Ormeau
Luscombe	Ormeau Hills	Pimpama
Kingsholme	Kingsholme	Kingsholme

Ormeau Hills is a residential locality in the City of Gold Coast, Queensland, Australia. In the 2021 census, Ormeau Hills had a population of 4,521 people.

== Geography ==
A small section of the eastern boundary of Ormeau Hills follows the Pacific Motorway.

The eastern part of the locality is a suburban development on lower flatter land (10 to 30 metres (33 to 98 ft) above sea level). The centre of the locality is more hilly, up to 130 metres (430 ft), and the land use is rural residential. The west of the locality is more mountainous, rising to 250 metres (820 ft), and is undeveloped.

Davis Hill is located in the west of the suburb on the border with Luscombe. It reaches a height of 298m, and has a radio mast at the summit.

== History ==
The name of the locality comes from the neighbouring locality of Ormeau, which, in turn, takes its name from Ormeau House the estate of Major Alexander Jenyns Boyd, a sugar planter of the 1860s. His first wife, Isabella (née Dawson) was born at Ormeau Road, Belfast, Ulster, United Kingdom. The word ormeau is French, meaning young elm.

== Demographics ==
In the 2011 census, Ormeau Hills had a population of 1,212 people.

In the 2016 census, Ormeau Hills had a population of 3,148 people.

In the 2021 census, Ormeau Hills had a population of 4,521 people.

== Education ==
There are no schools in Ormeau Hills. The nearest government primary school is Ormeau State School in neighbouring Pimpama to the east. The nearest government secondary school is Ormeau Woods State High School in neighbouring Ormeau to the north-east.
