= Norwell, Queensland =

Norwell
- Suburb
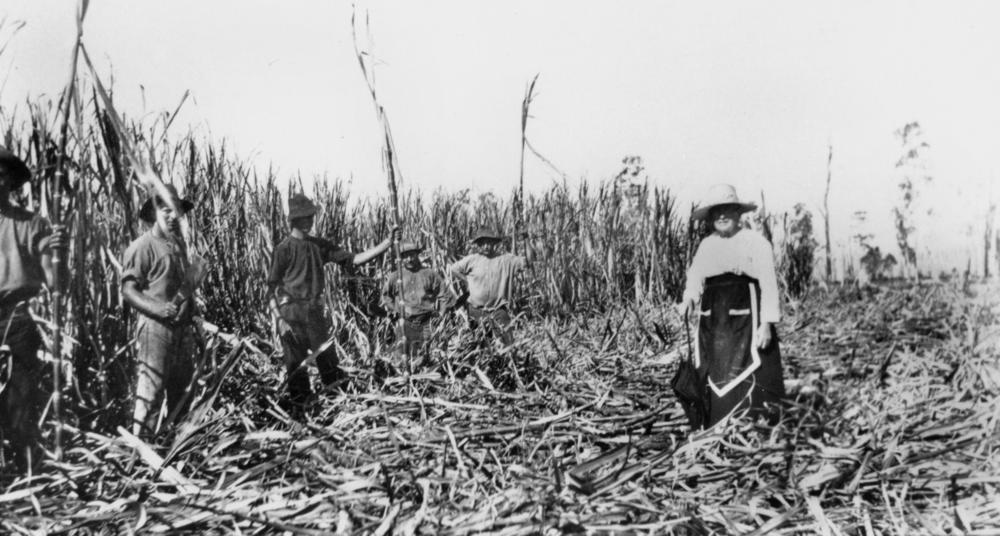
- Canefields, Norwell, circa 1915

- Interactive map of Norwell
- Coordinates: 27.7769°S 153.3125°E
- Country: Australia
- State: Queensland
- City: Gold Coast
- LGA: City of Gold Coast
- Location: 32.1 km (19.9 mi) NNW of Southport; 34.5 km (21.4 mi) NNW of Surfers Paradise; 50.7 km (31.5 mi) SE of Brisbane CBD

Government
  - State electorate: Coomera
  - Federal division: Fadden

Area
  - Total: 26.1 km^{2} (10.1 sq mi)

Population
  - Total: 189 (2021 census)
  - Density: 7.24/km^{2} (18.76/sq mi)
- Time zone: UTC+10:00 (AEST)
- Postcode: 4208
Suburbs around Norwell
| Gilberton | Woongoolba | Steiglitz |
| Ormeau | Norwell | Jacobs Well |
| Ormeau | Pimpama | Pimpama |

Norwell is a rural locality in the City of Gold Coast, Queensland, Australia. In the 2021 census, Norwell had a population of 189 people.

== Geography ==
Norwell is in the north of the City of Gold Coast. It is bounded to the east by Jacobs Well, to the south by Pimpama, to the west by Ormeau, and to the north by Gilberton and Woongoolba.

== History ==
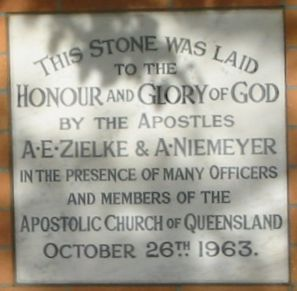
Foundation stone, Apostolic Church, 2005

In the late 1800s, the farming district located between the Pimpama River and the Logan River called Pimpama Island and encompasses the modern localities of Jacobs Well, Norwell, Steiglitz and Woongoolba. It was referred to as an island because there were a number of lagoons and swamps that isolated the area during the wet season; however, this disadvantage made it good land for growing sugar cane.

Norwell was named after the Norwell sugar plantation which was owned by William Pidd in the 1870s.

On 17 January 1910, Norwell State School was officially opened by James Stodart, Member of the Queensland Legislative Assembly for Logan. It closed on 30 April 1971. The school was at approx 544 Norwell Road (27.7753°S 153.3099°E). Later, the Norwell State School building was relocated to Woongoolba to extend the Woongoolba Public Hall.

Jacob's Well State School opened in 1920. It closed on 3 May 1974. The school then became the Jacob's Well Environmental Study Centre.

In 1914, the Apostolic Church of Queensland opened in a church in Norwell. On 26 October 1963, the foundation stone for a new church was laid by the Apostles Arnold Edward Zielke and Arnan Niemeyer. It opened in 1964, replacing an earlier church which was demolished.

St John's Lutheran Church was officially opened on Sunday 19 July 1914 by the Reverend Pastor Thiele. It was demolished in 1980. It was at approx 557 Norwell Road (27.7750°S 153.3105°E).

== Demographics ==
In the 2011 census, Norwell had a population of 282 people.

In the 2016 census, Norwell had a population of 200 people.

In the 2021 census, Norwell had a population of 189 people.

== Education ==
Despite the name, Jacobs Well Environmental Education Centre is an Outdoor and Environmental Education Centre on the corner of Behms and Pimpama-Jacobs Well Roads in Norwell (27.7824°S 153.3349°E). It was the former Jacob Wells State School.

There are no mainstream schools in Norwell. The nearest government primary schools are:

- Norfolk Village State School in neighbouring Ormeau to the west
- Woongoolba State School in neighbouring Woongoolba to the north
- Ormeau State School in neighbouring Pimpama to the south
- Pimpama State Primary College, also in Pimpama

The nearest government secondary schools are Ormeau Woods State High School in Ormeau and Pimpama State Secondary College in Pimpama.

== Amenities ==
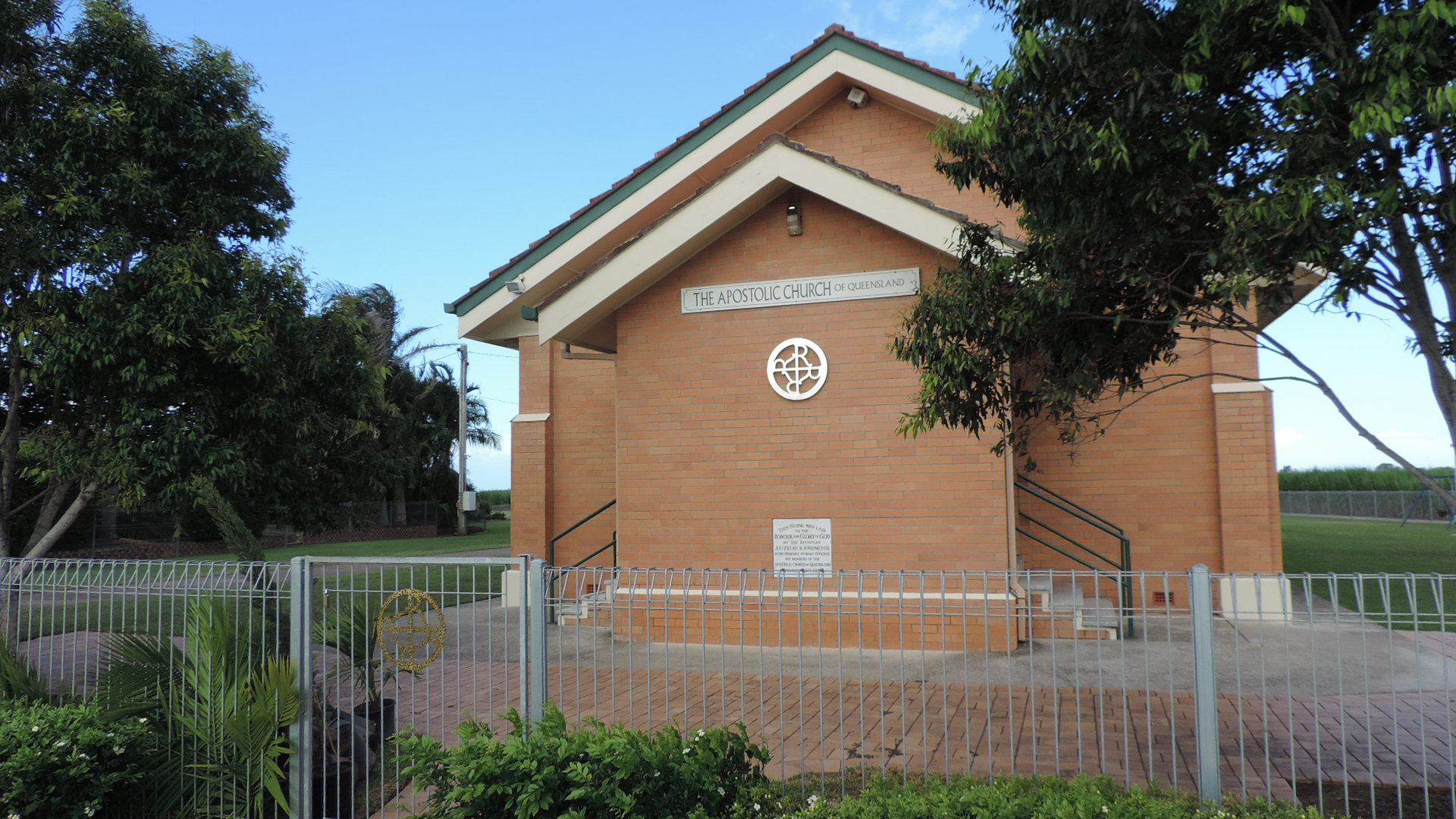
Apostolic Church, Norwell, 2014

Norwell Apostolic Church is at 207 Norwell Road (27.75901°S 153.29006°E).

The Gold Coast Sports Flying Club is based out of Heck Field (also known as Jacobs Well airfield), a small airfield located in the north-east of Norwell at 1638 Stapylton Jacobs Well Road (27.76767°S 153.33941°E). It provides facilities for recreational aviation. The club provides flight training from the airfield.

== Attractions ==
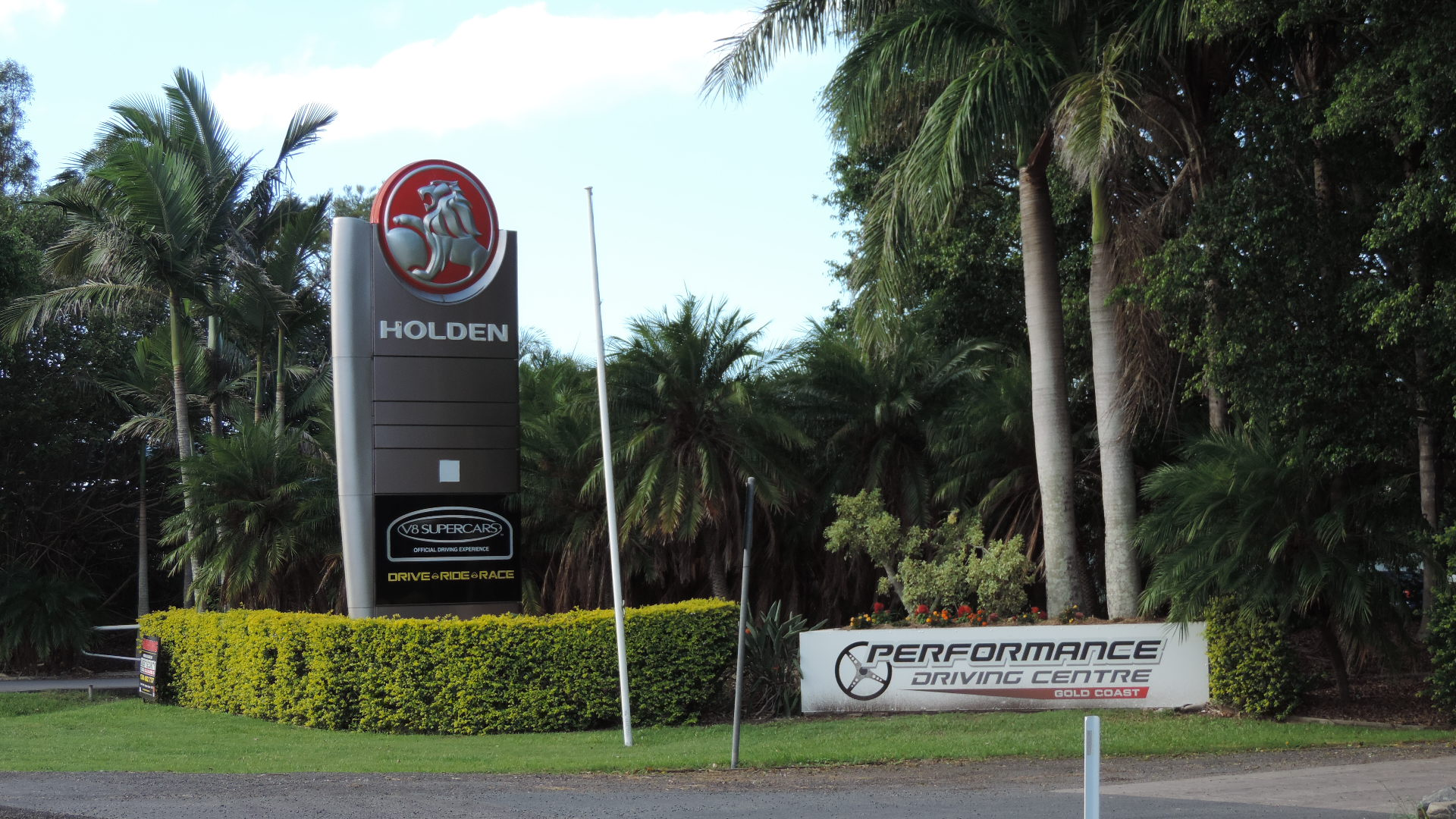
Entrance to the Holden Driving Centre, 2014

Holden operate a driver training facility at Norwell. In addition to driver safety programs at a number of levels of experience, the centre also offers 4WD training and performance driving courses and "hot laps" in a high-performance car. It is also the base for Paul Morris Motorsport and MARC Cars Australia.
