= Gilberton, Queensland =

Gilberton, Queensland may refer to:

- Gilberton, Queensland (Etheridge Shire), Australia
- Gilberton, Queensland (Gold Coast), Australia
