= Gilberton =

Gilberton is a place name used in several English-speaking countries.

In Australia:

- Gilberton, Queensland (Etheridge Shire)
- Gilberton, Queensland (Gold Coast)
- Gilberton, South Australia

In the United States:

- Gilberton, Pennsylvania

Other uses:

- Gilberton (publisher)
