= William Alexander Jenyns Boyd =

Australian journalist and schoolmaster

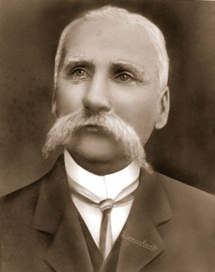
William Alexander Jenyns Boyd

William Alexander Jenyns Boyd (1842–1928) was a journalist and schoolmaster in Australia. He was admired for his "upright bearing and extensive learning".

== Early life ==
Boyd was born in Paris on 27 November 1842. His father was Colonel Charles Boyd (of the 95th Regiment), of Kilmarnock, Scotland. His mother was Mary Vachell, and Horace Vachell, the author, was his cousin. He was educated in France, Switzerland, Germany, and Italy, including at the Lycee de Versailles, near Paris.

== Career in Queensland ==
Although expected to join the army, Boyd decided to work on American sailing ships allowing him to he traveled widely around the world. When in England he heard John Dunmore Lang lecture on cotton-growing in Queensland, and this induced him to immigrate on the Saldanha to Brisbane in Queensland arriving in January 1862 where he purchase land at Oxley Creek (now Corinda). After a few years he obtained the appointment as head teacher at the Oxley West National School (now Sherwood State School).

Later on he took up a large area of land at Pimpama, growing sugarcane, and erected a sugar mill. He was successful in that business until cane disease, frosts, and other problems ruined nearly all the sugar-growers on the Pimpama, Logan, and Albert Rivers. His plantation, named Ormeau, gives its name to the town of Ormeau. His first wife, Isabella (née Dawson) was born at Ormeau Road, Belfast, Ulster, Ireland. The word ormeau is French, meaning young elm.

Next he became head master at the Townsville State School and Inspector of Schools in North Queensland. The only means of journeying in those days was horseback.

Journalism next attracted him and he purchased the Townsville newspaper Cleveland Bay Express which proved a good investment. Later he sold out and opened the Eton School at Milton and then at Nundah in Brisbane. From mid 1888 through to early 1890, he was headmaster of the Toowoomba Grammar School. From 1895 to 1896 he served as acting headmaster at Ipswich Boys' Grammar School while the headmaster was on leave.

As a journalist, he contributed to the London "Graphic'', Brisbane Courier, and The Queenslander.

In 1897 he was appointed editor of the Queensland Agricultural Journal which he held up to the time of his retirement.

He was a major in the Queensland Garrison Artillery.

Boyd was a past master of the St. Patrick's Lodge, Irish Constitution, of Brisbane Freemasons.

== Personal life ==
Boyd was twice married. He married is first wife, Isabella (née Dawson) on 2 December 1862 in Brisbane. Isabella was born at Ormeau Road, Belfast, Ulster, Ireland. Isabella died on 16 May 1916 and was buried in Toowong Cemetery.

On 22 January 1918 he married Cora Violet Pickton White at St Martins Church of England, Milton. She died on 4 December 1927.

He had an adopted daughter who was the widow of Lieutenant Ralph Clifton, an officer in the Royal Artillery, killed at the Western Front during World War I.

== Later life ==
Boyd retired from the position of editor of the "Queensland Agricultural Journal" in May 1921. After which he was engaged in literary pursuits, some of his work being published in the Brisbane Courier and The Queenslander.

Following the death of his second wife, he lived in Sydney with his adopted daughter where he died on Saturday 19 May 1928 aged 85 years. His body was brought to Brisbane for burial in the Toowong Cemetery on 21 May 1928; he was buried with his first wife Isabella.

== Published works ==
- Boyd, Alexander Jenyns (1882), Old colonials, Gordon and Gotch
- Boyd, Alexander Jenyns (1882), Queensland, Queensland Emigration Office
- Boyd, Alexander Jenyns (1889), The earth's history for boys, or, Geology in verse, Watson, Ferguson
- Boyd, Alexander Jenyns (1895), The mineral industry of Queensland at the close of 1895, Queensland Department of Mines
- Boyd, Alexander Jenyns (1895), Narrative of Capt. G. Pennefather's exploration of the Coen, Archer, and Batavia rivers, and of the islands of the western coast of the Gulf of Carpentaria in 1880, Royal Geographical Society of Australasia, Queensland Branch
- Boyd, Alexander Jenyns (1895), Antarctic exploration, Royal Geographical Society of Australasia (Queensland)
- Boyd, Alexander Jenyns (1910), Cotton cultivation in Queensland, A.J. Cumming, Queensland Government Printer
- Boyd, Alexander Jenyns (1920), Seasonable notes on potato culture, Queensland Department of Agriculture and Stock
