= Pimpama & Ormeau War Memorial =

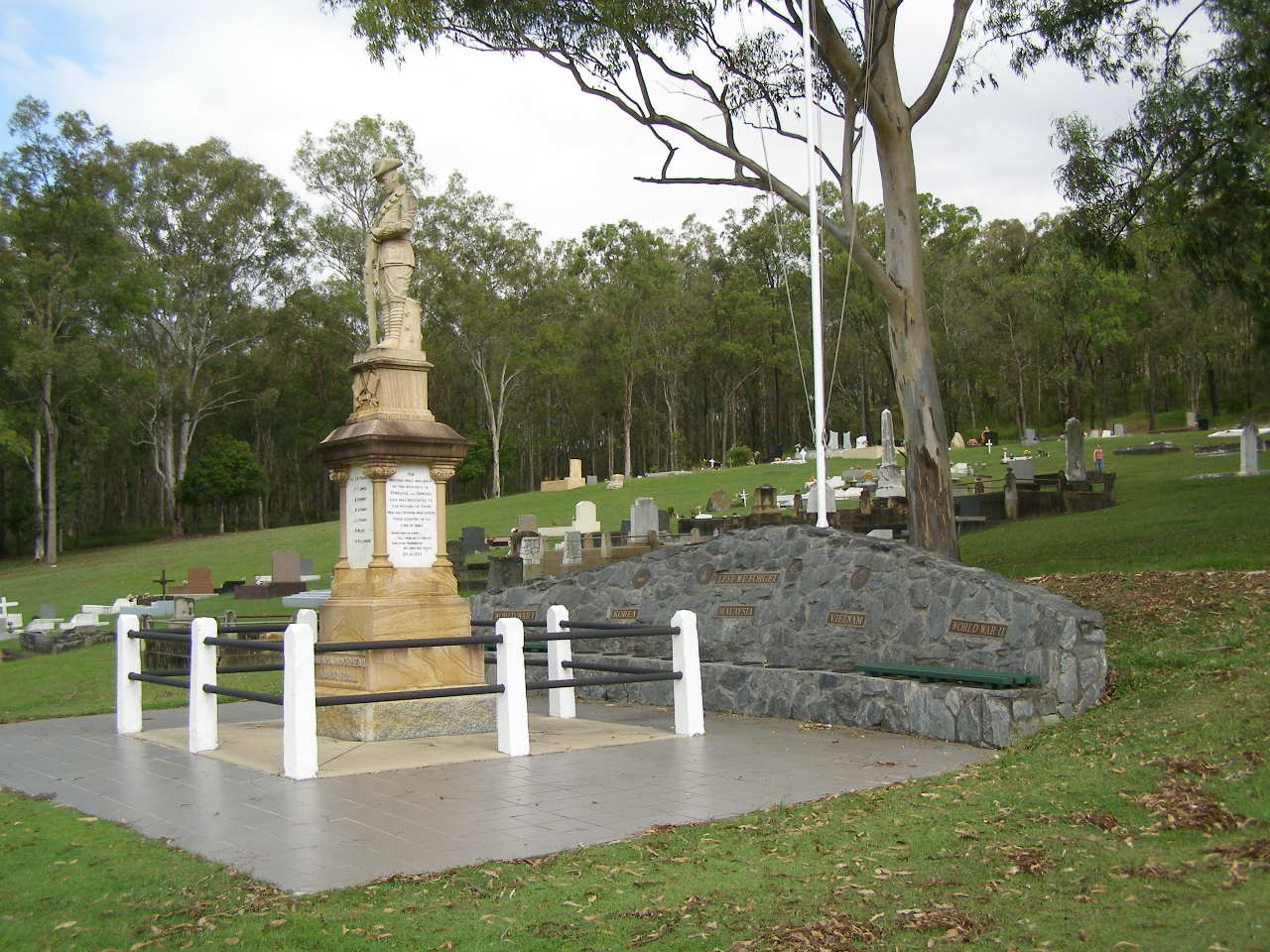
- Pimpama and Ormeau War Memorial, 2007

- Location within Queensland
- 27.8053°S 153.2677°E
- Location: Pacific Highway, Pimpama, Queensland, Australia

History
- Design period: 1914–1919 (World War I)
- Built: 1919

Queensland Heritage Register
- Official name: Pimpama & Ormeau War Memorial
- Type: state heritage (built)
- Designated: 21 October 1992
- Reference no.: 600004
- Significant period: 1919–
- Significant components: memorial surrounds/railings, memorial – soldier statue, views to

Pimpama & Ormeau War Memorial is a heritage-listed memorial at Pacific Highway, Pimpama, Queensland, Australia. It was built in 1919. It was added to the Queensland Heritage Register on 21 October 1992.

== History ==
The Pimpama and Ormeau War Memorial was erected by local residents in the grounds of the Pimpama Uniting (previously Methodist) Church. The masons were Andrew Lang Petrie and Son of Toowong, Brisbane who were responsible for many war memorials throughout Queensland. It cost £154, which was raised by public subscription.

Pimpama was originally part of the pastoral run of Beaudesert. When the railway line was constructed between Brisbane and Southport in the 1880s, the towns of Pimpama and Ormeau prospered.

The Methodist church was constructed away from the town centre in 1880 by David Coulter who arrived in the district in the 1870s. The War Memorial was erected in 1919 in the grounds of the church cemetery, (gazetted in 1923) in remembrance of the six local men who lost their lives in the First World War. It has been relocated within the church property many times, most recently in 1993. Despite this, it continues to be a prominent landmark in the area.

Australia, and Queensland in particular, had few civic monuments before the First World War. The memorials erected in its wake became our first national monuments, recording the devastating impact of the war on a young nation. Australia lost 60,000 from a population of about 4 million, representing one in five of those who served. No previous or subsequent war has made such an impact on the nation.

Even before the end of the war, memorials became a spontaneous and highly visible expression of national grief. To those who erected them, they were as sacred as grave sites, substitute graves for the Australians whose bodies lay in battlefield cemeteries in Europe and the Middle East. British policy decreed that the Empire war dead were to be buried where they fell. The word "cenotaph", commonly applied to war memorials at the time, literally means "empty tomb".

Australian war memorials are distinctive in that they commemorate not only the dead. Australians were proud that their first great national army, unlike other belligerent armies, was composed entirely of volunteers, men worthy of honour whether or not they made the supreme sacrifice. Many memorials honour all who served from a locality, not just the dead, providing valuable evidence of community involvement in the war. Such evidence is not readily obtainable from military records, or from state or national listings, where names are categorised alphabetically or by military unit.

Australian war memorials are also valuable evidence of imperial and national loyalties, at the time, not seen as conflicting; the skills of local stonemasons, metalworkers and architects; and of popular taste. In Queensland, the soldier statue was the popular choice of memorial, whereas the obelisk predominated in the southern states, possibly a reflection of Queensland's larger working-class population and a lesser involvement of architects.

Many of the First World War monuments have been updated to record local involvement in later conflicts, and some have fallen victim to unsympathetic re-location and repair.

Although there are many different types of memorials in Queensland, the digger statue is the most common. It was the most popular choice of communities responsible for erecting the memorials, embodying the ANZAC spirit and representing the qualities of the ideal Australian: loyalty, courage, youth, innocence and masculinity. The digger was a phenomenon peculiar to Queensland, perhaps due to the fact that other states had followed Britain's lead and established Advisory Boards made up of architects and artists, prior to the erection of war memorials. The digger statue was not highly regarded by artists and architects who were involved in the design of relatively few Queensland memorials.

Most statues were constructed by local masonry firms, although some were by artists or imported.

Of those produced by masonry firms, A L Petrie and Son of Toowong were the most prolific. They were the largest masonry firm in Queensland at this time and were responsible for many First World War memorials throughout the state. Some statues differed in detailing, although most were supplied on a range of standard pedestals. The pedestal at Pimpama is an early example of the style that was first used for the memorial at Ebbw Vale.

Following the relocation of the memorial within the church property in 1993, the Ormeau Pimpama War Memorial Committee sought professional advice on repair of the sandstone digger statue which had substantially deteriorated. At that time the arms were failing, as were the head and the hat. All of the available options for remedial work were considered to be only short-term solutions. Permission was granted to commission a sandstone replica of the original statue. The rifle, which had already been replaced due to earlier vandalism, was retained. The new digger was produced by R C Zeigler Monuments of Toowoomba during 1994 and unveiled on ANZAC Day 1995. The original digger was given to the Miles Historical Village.

== Description ==
The Pimpama Memorial is prominently located in the grounds of the Pimpama Uniting Church facing the Pacific Highway approximately halfway between Brisbane and the Gold Coast.

The stone memorial comprises a pedestal surmounted by a digger statue. It is surrounded by a low fence of evenly spaced white painted concrete posts linked by steel rails, also painted white.

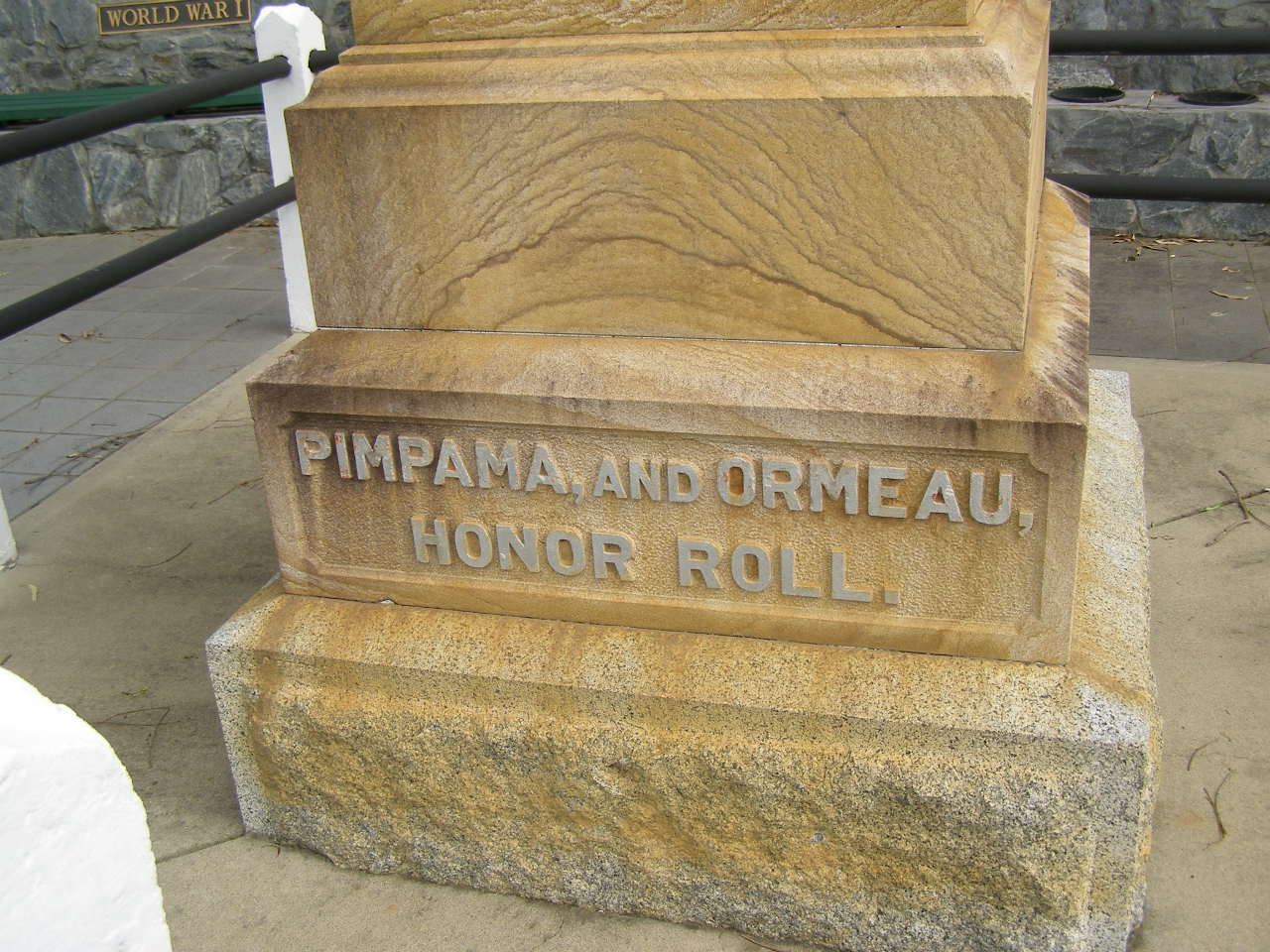
Pimpama and Ormeau War Memorial, base, 2007

It sits on a base step with margined, rough stone faces. Surmounting this are two smooth faced steps, the lower one having the words "Pimpama and Ormeau Honour Roll" relief carved on the front face.

The pedestal comprises a recessed square of marble plates with sandstone columns at each corner with foliated carved capitals and simple moulded bases. The front plate bears the leaded names of the seven local war dead, and the east side plate bears a commemorative inscription and a patriotic verse. This is capped by a cornice with curved pediment detail upon which sits a square sandstone plinth. Crossed flags (the Australian flag and the Union Jack) are carved in relief on the front face of the plinth and show remains of red, white, blue and gold paint.

Surmounting the plinth is the digger statue. The soldier stands to attention with his head bowed and his rifle reversed; his hands are crossed and resting on top of the rifle (reversed arms). He is supported by a tree trunk which is located behind and to one side of him.

== Heritage listing ==
Pimpama & Ormeau War Memorial was listed on the Queensland Heritage Register on 21 October 1992 having satisfied the following criteria.

The place is important in demonstrating the evolution or pattern of Queensland's history.

War Memorials are important in demonstrating the pattern of Queensland's history as they are representative of a recurrent theme that involved most communities throughout the state. They provide evidence of an era of widespread Australian patriotism and nationalism, particularly during and following the First World War. The monuments manifest a unique documentary record and are demonstrative of popular taste in the inter-war period.

The place is important in demonstrating the principal characteristics of a particular class of cultural places.

Erected in 1919, the memorial at Pimpama demonstrates the principal characteristics of a commemorative structure erected as an enduring record of a major historical event. This is achieved through the use of appropriate materials and design elements. As a digger statue it is representative of the most popular form of memorial in Queensland.

The place is important because of its aesthetic significance.

This particular statue is also of aesthetic value, both for its high level of workmanship and design, and as a highly visible and well-known landmark in the area. It is rare for its inclusion of an unusual inscription and patriotic verse.

The place has a strong or special association with a particular community or cultural group for social, cultural or spiritual reasons.

It has a strong association with the community as evidence of the impact of a major historic event and probably is Queensland's best known digger memorial.

The place has a special association with the life or work of a particular person, group or organisation of importance in Queensland's history.

It also has special association with the monumental masonry firm, A L Petrie and Son as evidence of their work.
