= Gilberton, Queensland (Gold Coast) =

Gilberton Queensland
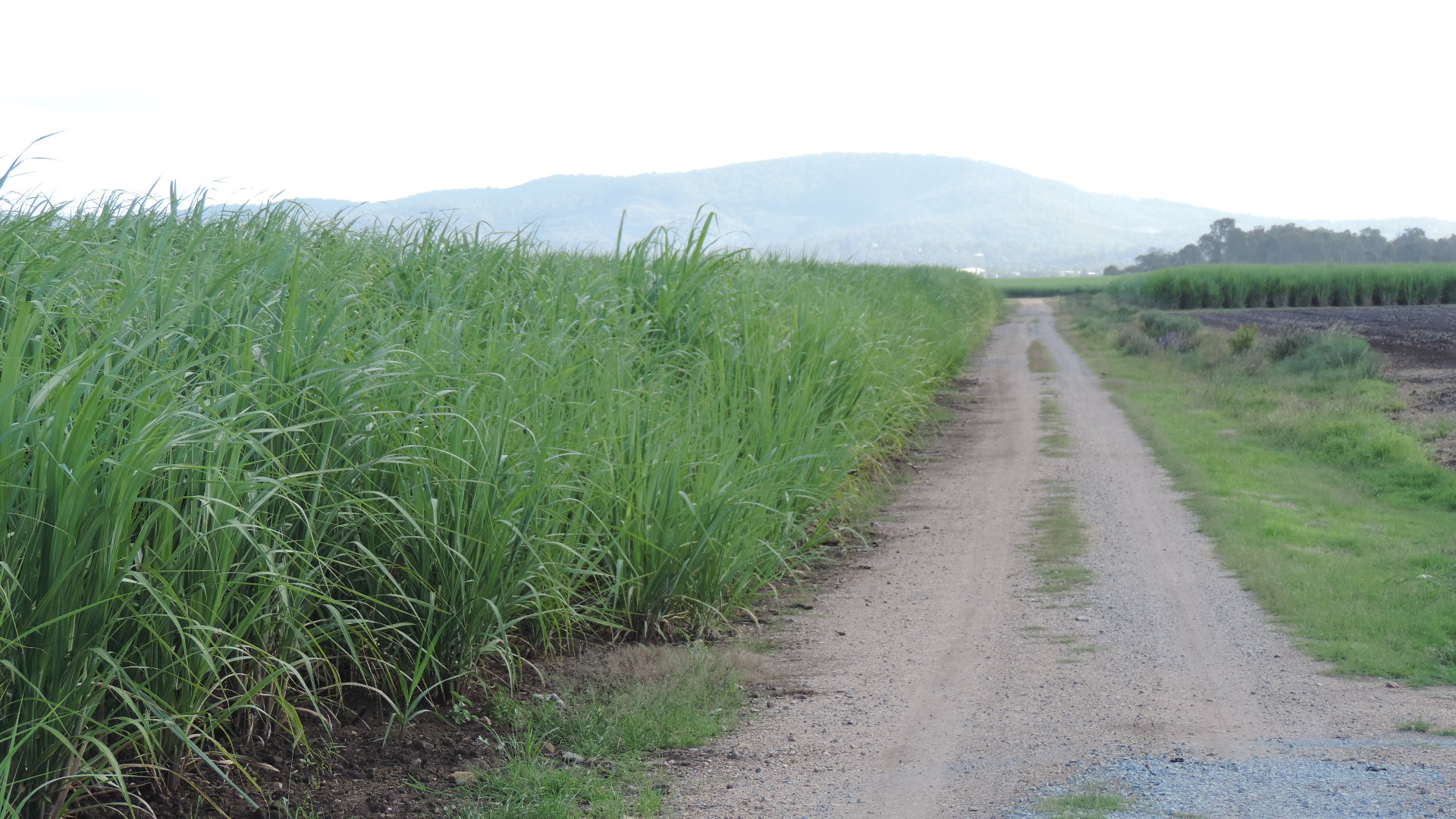
- Private road through sugar cane fields, 2014

- Coordinates: 27.7425°S 153.2738°E
- Population: 31 (2021 census)
  - Density: 3.88/km^{2} (10.04/sq mi)
- Postcode(s): 4208
- Area: 8.0 km^{2} (3.1 sq mi)
- Time zone: AEST (UTC+10:00)
- Location: 11.3 km (7 mi) ESE of Beenleigh; 38.9 km (24 mi) NNW of Southport; 42.1 km (26 mi) NNW of Southport; 44.2 km (27 mi) SSE of Brisbane
- LGA(s): City of Gold Coast
- State electorate(s): Coomera
- Federal division(s): Fadden
Suburbs around Gilberton:
Alberton	Alberton	Alberton
Stapylton	Gilberton	Woongoolba
Ormeau	Norwell	Norwell

Gilberton is a rural locality in the City of Gold Coast, Queensland, Australia. In the 2021 census, Gilberton had a population of 31 people.

== Geography ==
The land is flat and low-lying, being less than 10 metres (33 ft) above sea level. It is well-watered by a number of creeks. Most of the land use is growing sugarcane with a small area of grazing on native vegetation in the west of the locality.

== Demographics ==
In the 2016 census, Gilberton had a population of 25 people.

In the 2021 census, Gilberton had a population of 31 people.

== Education ==
There are no schools in Gilberton. The nearest government primary schools are Woongoolba State School in neighbouring Woongoolba to the east, Ormeau State School in Pimpama to the south, and Norfolk Village State School in neighbouring Ormeau to the south-east. The nearest government secondary schools are Beenleigh State High School in Beenleigh to north-east and Ormeau Woods State High School in neighbouring Ormeau to the south-east.

== Amenities ==
There are a number of parks in the area, including:

- Goldmine Park (27.7623°S 153.2624°E)
- Prairie Reserve (27.7550°S 153.2544°E)

== Environmental issues ==
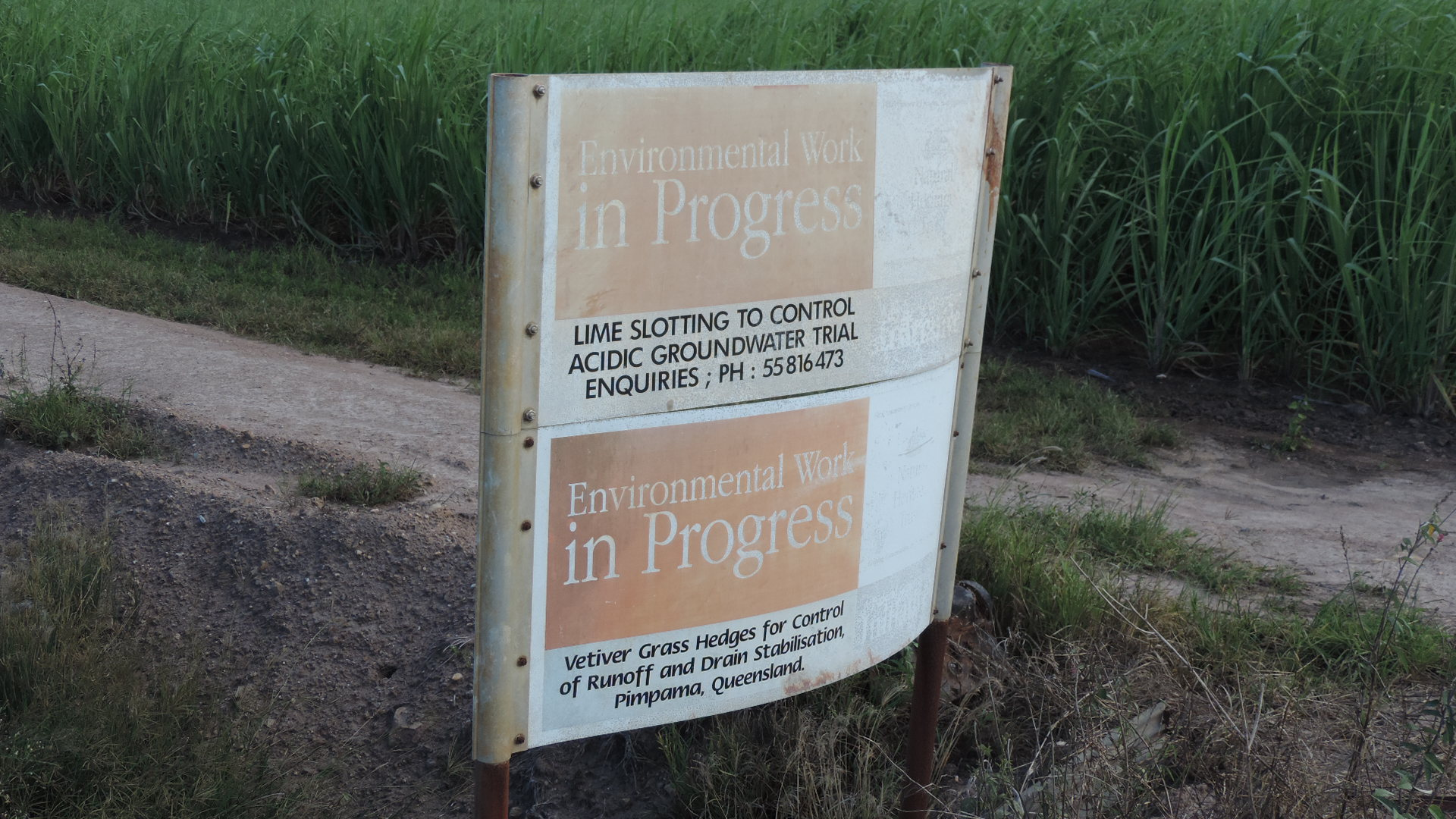
Sign about environment remediation, Gilberton, 2014

Gilberton has acid sulphate soil in naturally water-logged conditions. The lowering of the water table due to drainage work on the Pimpama River allows oxidisation of the iron sulfide to create sulphuric acid which can, in turn, enable the release of iron, aluminium and other heavy metals, doing damage to both the natural and built environment. Application of lime to neutralise low pH levels and the maintenance of broad shallow drains to reduce oxidisation are used to mitigate the problem.

== Coomera Connector ==
The Coomera Connector will connect Gold Coast suburbs from Coomera to Carrara with a multi-modal urban arterial road by 2031. It is proposed to reserve a land corridor from Coomera to Stapylton for future extensions; on current plans, this land corridor will pass through Gilberton near the confluence of Sandy Creek and Halfway Creek.
