= Kingsholme, Queensland =

Kingsholme Gold Coast City, Queensland
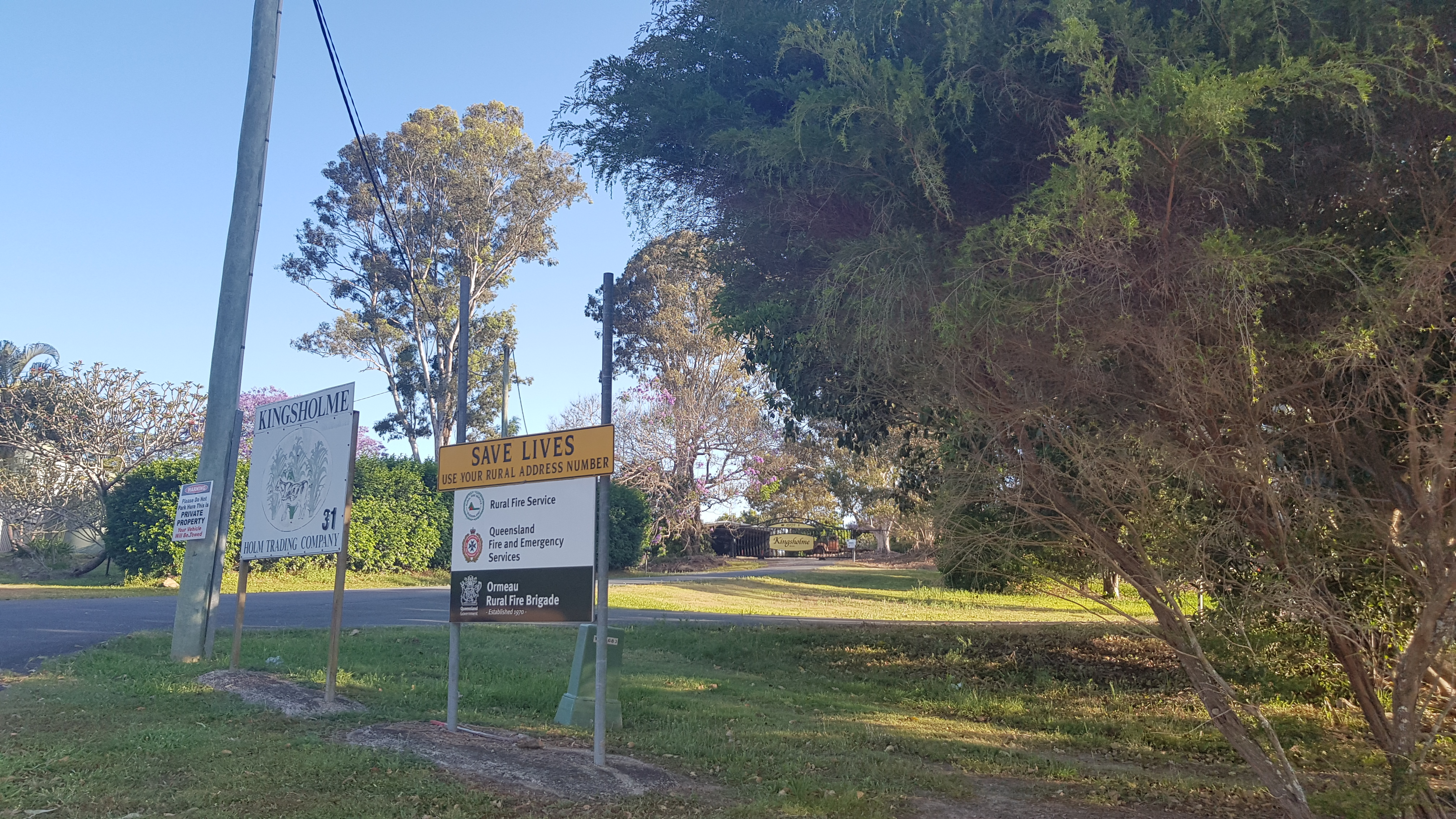
- Upper Ormeau Road, 2022

- Coordinates: 27.8230°S 153.2352°E
- Population: 782 (2021 census)
  - Density: 38.91/km^{2} (100.76/sq mi)
- Postcode(s): 4208
- Area: 20.1 km^{2} (7.8 sq mi)
- Time zone: AEST (UTC+10:00)
- Location: 35.6 km (22 mi) NNW of Southport; 38 km (24 mi) NNW of Surfers Paradise; 52.7 km (33 mi) SSE of Brisbane CBD
- LGA(s): City of Gold Coast
- State electorate(s): Coomera
- Federal division(s): Forde
Suburbs around Kingsholme:
Luscombe	Ormeau Hills	Ormeau; Pimpama
Cedar Creek	Kingsholme	Willow Vale
Cedar Creek	Wongawallan	Wongawallan

Kingsholme is a rural locality in the City of Gold Coast, Queensland, Australia. In the 2021 census, Kingsholme had a population of 782 people.

== Geography ==
The locality is roughly bounded to the west by the Darlington Range (27.8254°S 153.2142°E).

A small portion of the northeastern boundary of the locality follows the Pacific Motorway.

== History ==
The locality was named by James Murtha circa 1869. Originally from County Cork, Ireland, he named his property, Kingsholme. Other notable pioneering families included the Thomson family (Alexander Thomson) who emigrated from Scotland in 1889.

Historically, farming families grew bananas, sugar cane and arrowroot. Some supplemented their farm income with dairying or sawmilling. Today, many former farms have been sub divided.

== Demographics ==
In the 2011 census, Kingsholme had a population of 281 people.

In the 2016 census, Kingsholme had a population of 286 people.

In the 2021 census, Kingsholme had a population of 782 people.

== Education ==
There are no schools in Kingsholme. The nearest government primary schools are Ormeau State School in neighbouring Pimpama to the north-east and Cedar Creek State School in neighbouring Cedar Creek to the west. The nearest government secondary school is Ormeau Woods State High School in Ormeau to the north-east.

== Amenities ==
Ormeau Rural Fire Station is the southern side of eastern end of Upper Ormeau Road (27.8031°S 153.2597°E).

There are a number of parks in the locality, including:

- Edward Courbould Reserve And Nature Retreat (27.8059°S 153.2125°E)
- Gerrale Dr Reserve 1 (27.8319°S 153.2513°E)
- Gerrale Dr Reserve 2 (27.8334°S 153.2484°E)
- Hidden Court Reserve (27.8190°S 153.2481°E)
- Howard Creek Reserve (27.8603°S 153.2190°E)
- Monty Kerkin Environmental Reserve (27.8093°S 153.2359°E)
- Ormeau Hill District Sports Park (27.8004°S 153.2592°E)
- Rocky Creek Conservation Area (27.8232°S 153.2105°E)
- Stage Coach Reserve (27.8198°S 153.2533°E)
- The Grange Environmental Park (27.8414°S 153.2366°E)
- Upper Ormeau Conservation Area (27.8481°S 153.2155°E)
- Upper Ormeau Rd Reserve (27.8152°S 153.2250°E)
- Wongawallan Conservation Area (27.8515°S 153.2301°E)
