= Heck Field =

Heck Field Jacobs Well Airfield
- IATA: none; ICAO: YHEC

Summary
- Airport type: Private
- Owner: W.H. Heck & Sons Pty Ltd
- Operator: Gold Coast Sports Flying Club
- Location: 1638 Stapylton – Jacobs Well Road, Norwell, Queensland
- Elevation AMSL: 10 ft / 3 m
- Coordinates: 27.76767°S 153.33941°E

Map
- Location in Queensland YHEC (Queensland) YHEC (Australia) YHEC (Oceania)

Runways
Direction	Length		Surface
Direction	m	ft	Surface
10/28	700	2,297	Gravel
18/36	640	2,100	Gravel
- Sources: Australian AIP and aerodrome chart

Heck Field, also known as Jacobs Well Airfield (IATA: YHEC) is a small airfield in Norwell, on the northern outskirts of the City of Gold Coast, in Queensland. The privately owned and operated facility serves as a base for the Gold Coast Sports Flying Club and provides facilities for flight training and recreational aviation.

== Airport facilities and operations ==
Heck Field has two runways, with crushed gravel over grass surfaces measuring 700 m (2,300 ft) long by 10 m (33 ft) wide on runway 10/28 and 640 m (2,100 ft) by 15 m (49 ft) for runway 18/36, suitable for light-sport category aircraft. It is restricted to single-engine general aviation types and operates only during daylight hours. As an uncontrolled airport with a low volume of traffic, pilots are required to communicate via a Common Traffic Advisory Frequency (CTAF) shared with nearby Southport Airport to safely co-ordinate arrivals and departures. The Jacobs Well VOR radio-navigation aid was located approximately 1 km (0.62 mi) north-west of the airfield prior to its decommissioning in May 2016.

In addition to the Gold Coast Sports Flying Club, tenants at Heck Field include the Australian Pacific Aviation flight school and formerly Foxbat Australia, the Australian dealer for Aeroprakt aircraft (now based at Albury Airport in New South Wales). The airfield has been used as a filming location, with scenes from movies including San Andreas and Dora and the Lost City of Gold shot here.

== See also ==
- List of airports in Queensland
