= Queensland Agricultural Journal =

- Discipline: Agriculture, agricultural science
- Language: English

Publication details
- History: 1897–1989
- Publisher: Queensland Department of Primary Industries (Australia)
- Frequency: Bimonthly

Standard abbreviations
- ISO 4: Qld. Agric. J.

Indexing
- ISSN: 0157-7786
- OCLC no.: 1763300

The Queensland Agricultural Journal was a peer-reviewed scientific journal published by the Queensland Department of Primary Industries (formerly the Department of Agriculture and Stock). It was established in 1897, with William Alexander Jenyns Boyd as the founding editor-in-chief until 1921.
