= Jacobs Well, Queensland =

Jacobs Well Gold Coast, Queensland
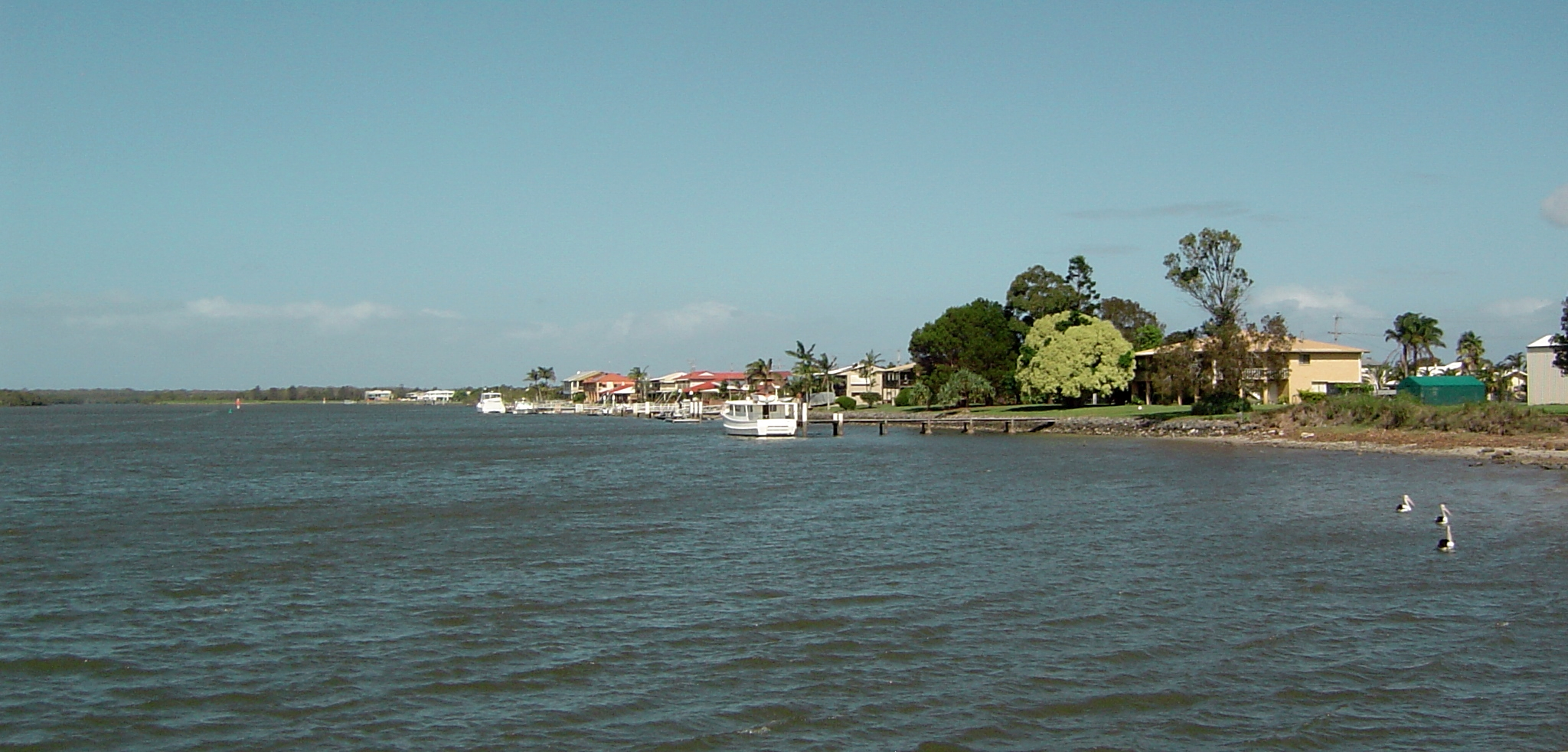
- Jacobs Well as seen from Moreton Bay, 2014

- Coordinates: 27.7861°S 153.3613°E
- Population: 2,882 (2021 census)
  - Density: 203.0/km^{2} (525.7/sq mi)
- Postcode(s): 4208
- Area: 14.2 km^{2} (5.5 sq mi)
- Time zone: AEST (UTC+10:00)
- Location: 10.8 km (7 mi) NE of Pimpama; 35.3 km (22 mi) N of Southport; 38.5 km (24 mi) N of Surfers Paradise; 56.3 km (35 mi) SE of Brisbane CBD
- LGA(s): City of Gold Coast
- State electorate(s): Coomera
- Federal division(s): Fadden
Suburbs around Jacobs Well:
Woongoolba	Steiglitz	Southern Moreton Bay Islands
Norwell	Jacobs Well	Southern Moreton Bay Islands
Pimpama	Pimpama	Southern Moreton Bay Islands

Jacobs Well is a coastal suburb in the City of Gold Coast, Queensland, Australia. In the 2021 census, Jacobs Well had a population of 2,882 people.

Jacob Wells is positioned on the delta of the Pimpama River at the southern end of Moreton Bay. It is best known for its four-lane boat ramp, Volunteer Marine Rescue facility and the surrounding sugarcane fields.

== Geography ==
Jacobs Well is bounded to the north by Steiglitz, to the east by Moreton Bay, to the south by the Pimpama River and to the west by Norwell.

Calypso Bay is a canal estate at the south-east end of Jacobs Well (27.7940°S 153.3750°E), built on a former sand mining lease and the surrounding mangrove tidal land. The estate has direct boating access to The Broadwater and Moreton Bay.

== History ==
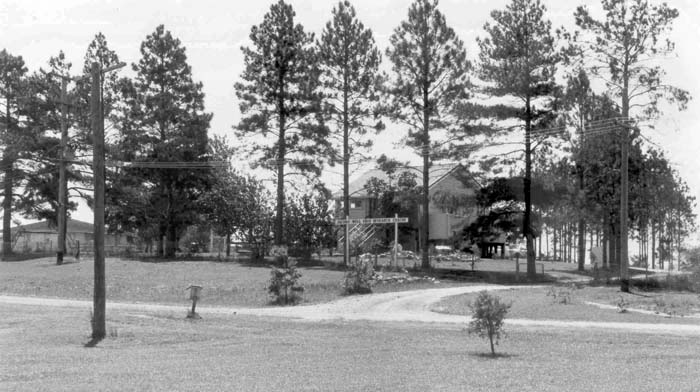
Former Jacobs Well State School

In the late 1800s, the farming district located between the Pimpama River and the Logan River called Pimpama Island encompassed the present-day localities of Jacobs Well, Norwell, Steiglitz and Woongoolba. It was referred to as an island because there were a number of lagoons and swamps that isolated the area during the wet season; however, this disadvantage made it good land for growing sugarcane.

Jacob's Well State School opened in 1920. It closed on 3 May 1974. The school then became the Jacob's Well Environmental Study Centre. The school was on the corner of Behms and Pimpama-Jacobs Well Roads (27.7824°S 153.3349°E), now within the neighbouring suburb of Norwell to the west.

Jacobs Well was once part of the Shire of Albert.

In February 2020, record levels of rainfall caused flooding in the Calypso Bay canal estate.

== Demographics ==
In the 2016 census, Jacobs Well had a population of 1,839 people.

In the 2021 census, Jacobs Well had a population of 2,882 people.

== Education ==
There are no schools in Jacobs Well. The nearest government primary schools are Woongoolba State School in neighbouring Woongoolba to the north-west and Pimpama State Primary College in neighbouring Pimpama to the south-west. The nearest government secondary school is Pimpama State Secondary College also in Pimpama to the south-west.

Despite the name, Jacobs Well Environmental Education Centre is in neighbouring Norwell.

== Amenities ==
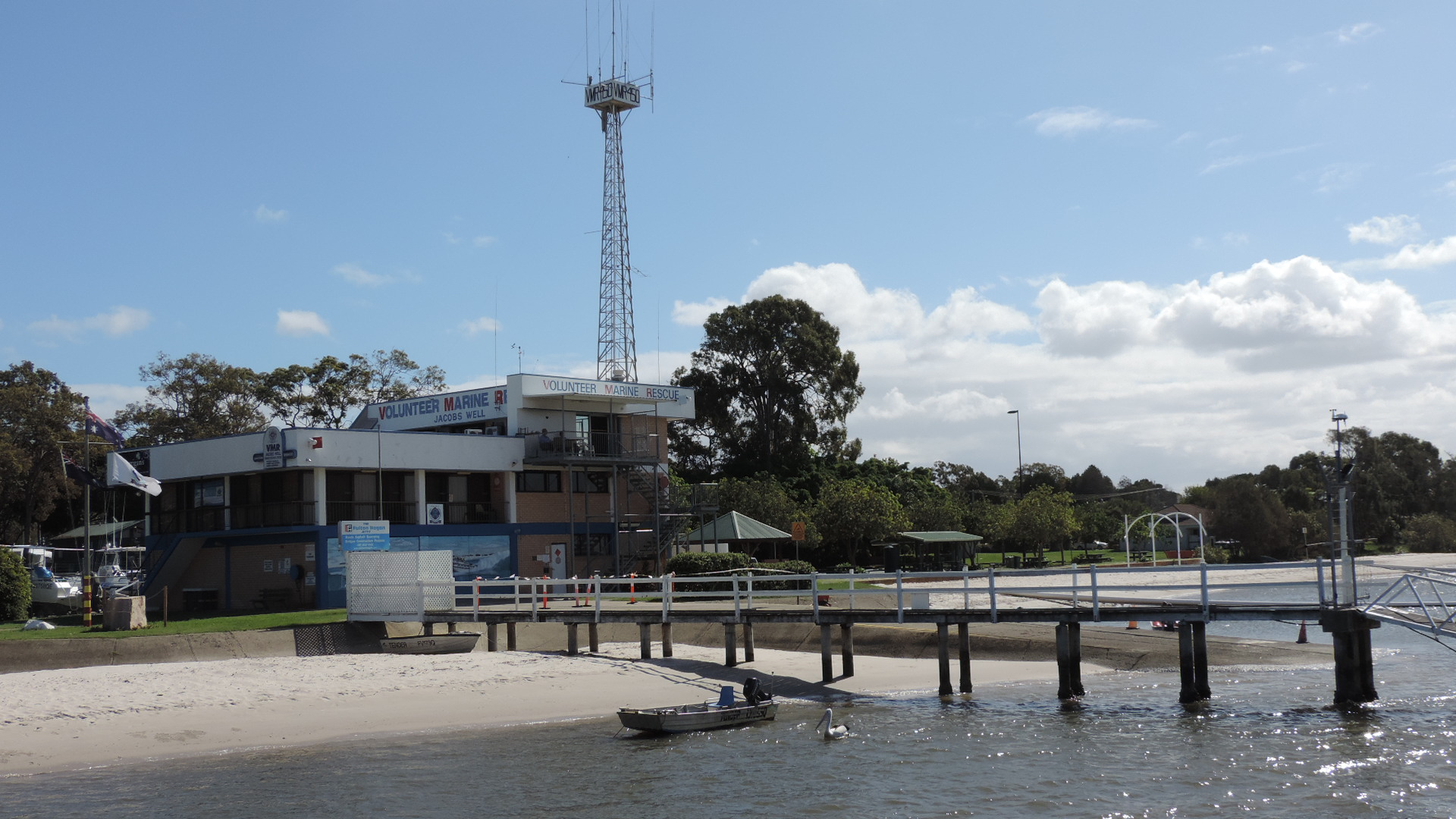
Volunteer Marine Rescue facility, 2014

Jacobs Well offers many amenities for the boating and fishing enthusiast. The Lions Park at the eastern end of Jacobs Well Road (27.7807°S 153.3668°E) has a sandy beach facing Moreton Bay, with an enclosed swimming area, barbeque facilities and a bait & tackle shop. There is a four-lane boat ramp, pontoon, parking for cars with trailers, and camping ground.

Jacobs Well Volunteer Marine Rescue operates from the Lions Park (27.7796°S 153.3664°E). It provides rescue services on Moreton Bay, the Gold Coast Broadwater and in the Coomera, Logan and Albert Rivers.

The village has a doctors surgery, chemist, small supermarket, bakery, real estate agents, hair dressers, several cafes, takeaways & a tavern with restaurant.

Jacobs Well Community Centre is in Riesenweber Park at 3 Bay Drive (27.7796°S 153.3635°E). It is operated by the Gold Coast City Council and is available for community events. The council operates a mobile library service which visits the Community Centre fortnightly.

The Calypso Bay Marina is at 5 Harrigans Lane (27.7884°S 153.3760°E).
