= Ormeau, Queensland =

Populated place in Australia

Ormeau
- Town
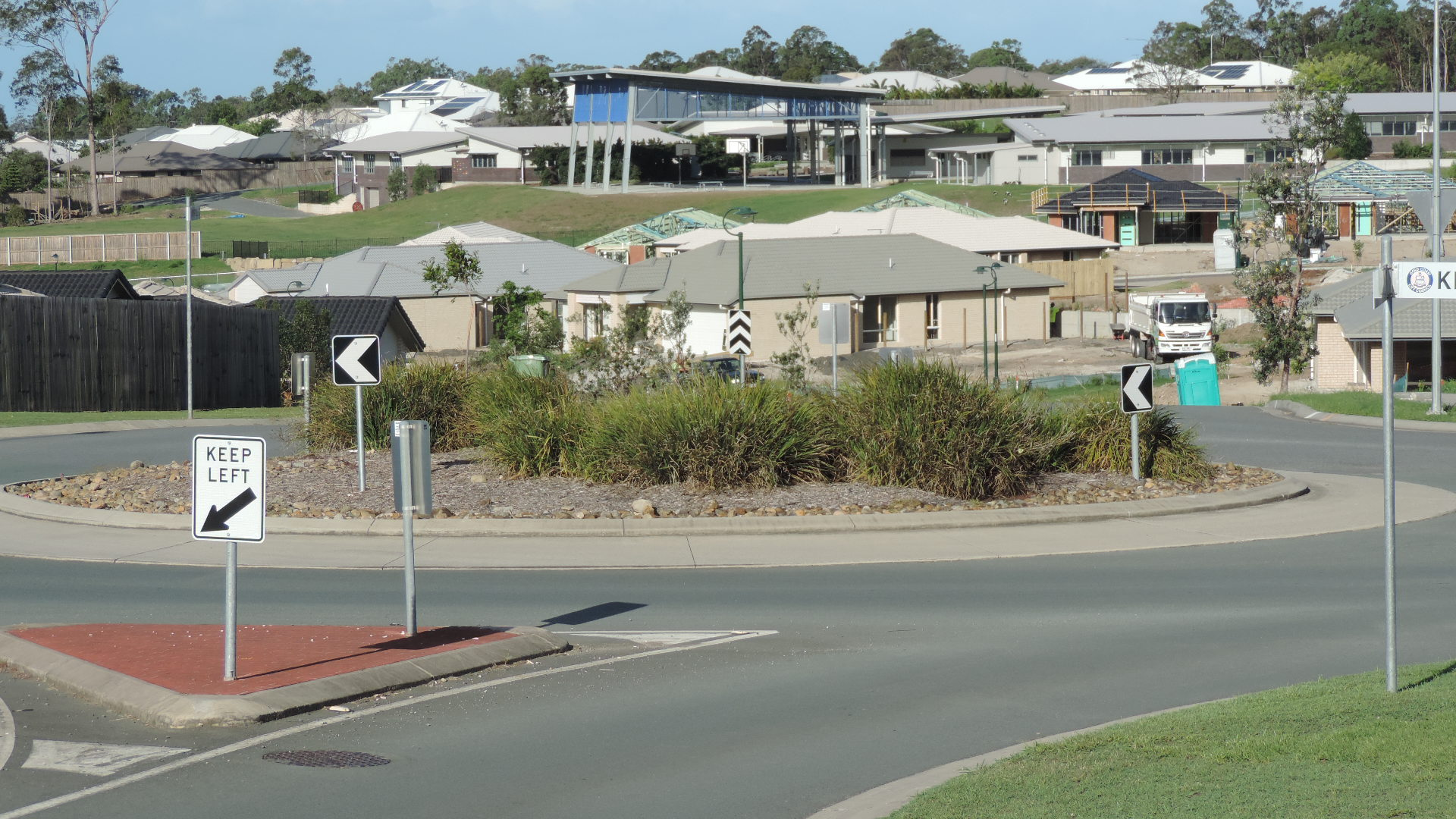
- Looking from Jasmine Crescent across new housing developments towards the Mother Teresa Catholic Primary School, Ormeau, 2014

- Interactive map of Ormeau
- Coordinates: 27.7966°S 153.26°E
- Country: Australia
- State: Queensland
- City: Gold Coast
- LGA: City of Gold Coast
- Location: 30.0 km (18.6 mi) NNW of Southport; 33.1 km (20.6 mi) NNW of Surfers Paradise; 44.2 km (27.5 mi) SE of Brisbane CBD

Government
  - State electorate: Coomera
  - Federal division: Forde

Area
  - Total: 16.4 km^{2} (6.3 sq mi)

Population
  - Total: 15,938 (2021 census)
  - Density: 971.8/km^{2} (2,517/sq mi)
- Time zone: UTC+10:00 (AEST)
- Postcode: 4208
Localities around Ormeau
Yatala	Stapylton	Gilberton
Luscombe	Ormeau	Norwell
Ormeau Hills	Kingsholme	Pimpama

Ormeau is a hinterland town and suburb in the City of Gold Coast, Queensland, Australia. In the 2021 census, the suburb of Ormeau had a population of 15,938 people.

== Geography ==
Ormeau is located in the northern Gold Coast, approximately 41 kilometres (25 mi) north of Surfers Paradise, and 49 kilometres (30 mi) south of Brisbane.

Its northern boundary adjoins Yatala and its southern boundary is the Pimpama River.

Cupania is a neighbourhood within the north of the suburb (27.7691°S 153.2386°E). It was gazetted on 5 October 1991 and named after the Cupaniopsis anacardioides tree that was planted on the estate.

== History ==
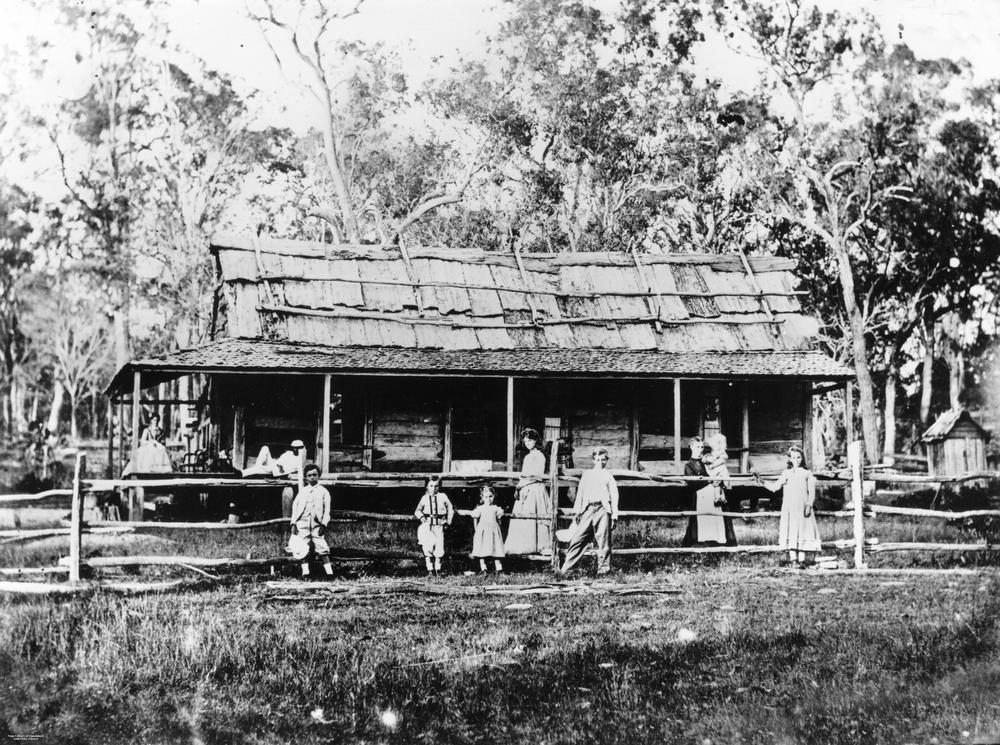
Family outside a homestead at Ormeau, ca. 1875

The name of the town came from Ormeau House the estate of Major Alexander Jenyns Boyd, a sugar planter of the 1860s. His first wife, Isabella (née Dawson) was born at Ormeau Road, Belfast, Ulster, Northern Ireland. The word ormeau is French, meaning young elm.

Podinga Provisional School opened on 5 August 1878. In 1892 it was renamed Ormeau Provisional School. On 1 January 1909, it became Ormeau State School. It is within the present-day boundaries of the suburb of Pimpama.

Ormeau Upper State School opened on 3 February 1919 and closed circa 1933.

Toogoolawa School opened on 26 September 2001.

Livingstone Christian College opened in January 2002.

Lutheran Ormeau Rivers District School opened on 23 January 2006.

Norfolk Village State School opened on 1 January 2009 with 430 students. It was originally proposed to be named Cupania State School after the neighbourhood.

Ormeau Woods State High School opened on 1 January 2009. It was originally proposed to be named Ormeau State High School.

Mother Teresa Catholic Primary School opened in 2011 with 54 students in Years Prep-3.

== Demographics ==
In the 2011 census, the suburb of Ormeau had a population of 12,439 people, 50.1% female and 49.9% male. The median age of the Ormeau population was 31 years, 6 years below the national median of 37. 70.8% of people living in Ormeau were born in Australia. The other top responses for country of birth were New Zealand 10.2%, England 6.0%, South Africa 1.6%, Scotland 0.8% and Germany 0.5%. 90.4% of people only spoke English at home; the next most common languages were 0.3% Spanish, 0.3% German, 0.3% Dutch, 0.3% Afrikaans and 0.3% Russian.

In the 2016 census, the suburb of Ormeau had a population of 14,460 people, 50.7% female and 49.3% male. The median age of the Ormeau population was 32 years, 6 years below the national median of 38. 70.1% of people living in Ormeau were born in Australia. The other top responses for country of birth were New Zealand 9.8%, England 4.8%, South Africa 1.8%, Scotland 0.8% and Germany 0.4%. 87.7% of people only spoke English at home; the next most common languages were 0.7% Afrikaans, 0.5% Mandarin, 0.4% German, 0.3% Spanish and 0.3% Russian.

In the 2021 census, the suburb of Ormeau had a population of 15,938 people, 50.9% female and 49.1% male. The median age of the Ormeau population was 33 years, 5 years below the national median of 38. 73.1% of people living in Ormeau were born in Australia. The other top responses for country of birth were New Zealand 9.2%, England 4.6%, South Africa 1.5%, Scotland 0.5% and the Philippines 0.5%. 89.2% of people only spoke English at home; the next most common languages were 0.5% Mandarin, 0.5% Afrikaans, 0.4% Spanish, 0.3% Maori (New Zealand), and 0.3% Russian.

== Education ==
Norfolk Village State School is a government primary (Prep–6) school for boys and girls at 83 Halfway Drive (27.7729°S 153.2447°E). In 2018, the school had an enrolment of 1,050 students with 72 teachers (67 full-time equivalent) and 44 non-teaching staff (30 full-time equivalent). It includes a special education program.

Mother Teresa Catholic Primary School is a Catholic primary (Prep–6) school for boys and girls at 169 Eggersdorf Road (27.7824°S 153.2726°E). In 2018, the school had an enrolment of 243 students with 21 teachers (17 full-time equivalent) and 13 non-teaching staff (7 full-time equivalent).

Livingstone Christian College is a private primary and secondary (Prep–12) school for boys and girls at 62 Reedmans Road (27.7931°S 153.2665°E). In 2018, the school had an enrolment of 1050 students with 80 teachers (65 full-time equivalent) and 69 non-teaching staff (51 full-time equivalent).

Toogoolawa School is a private primary and secondary (2–10) school for boys at Off Service Road, Pacific Highway (27.7973°S 153.2623°E). In 2018, the school had an enrolment of 96 students with 4 teachers and 21 non-teaching staff (19 full-time equivalent).

Ormeau Woods State High School is a government secondary (7–12) school for boys and girls at Goldmine Road (27.7703°S 153.2641°E). In 2018, the school had an enrolment of 1263 students with 100 teachers (98 full-time equivalent) and 56 non-teaching staff (41 full-time equivalent). It includes a special education program.

Despite their names, Ormeau State School and Lutheran Ormeau Rivers District School (LORDS) are both within the suburban boundaries of neighbouring Pimpama to the south-east.

== Amenities ==
The Gold Coast City Council operates a fortnightly mobile library service which makes four visits to Ormeau:

- the corner of Eggersdorf and Stewarts Road
- Peachey Road
- Reedmans Road, between Toogoolawa and Livingstone schools
- Norfolk Park at Halfway Drive

== Sport and recreation ==
A number of well-known sporting teams represent the local area, including the Ormeau Shearers is the local rugby league club who play home games at Ormeau Oval. The Ormeau Bulldogs are the local football (AFL) team for both juniors and masters (over 35's), which had two new ovals open for use in 2014.

Ormeau All Stars Football Club was formed in 2013 to fill the need for a local soccer club in the community. All Stars play home games at Norfolk Park in Ormeau.

== Transport ==
- Ormeau railway station (Gold Coast Line)
