= Pimpama, Queensland =

Pimpama
- Suburb
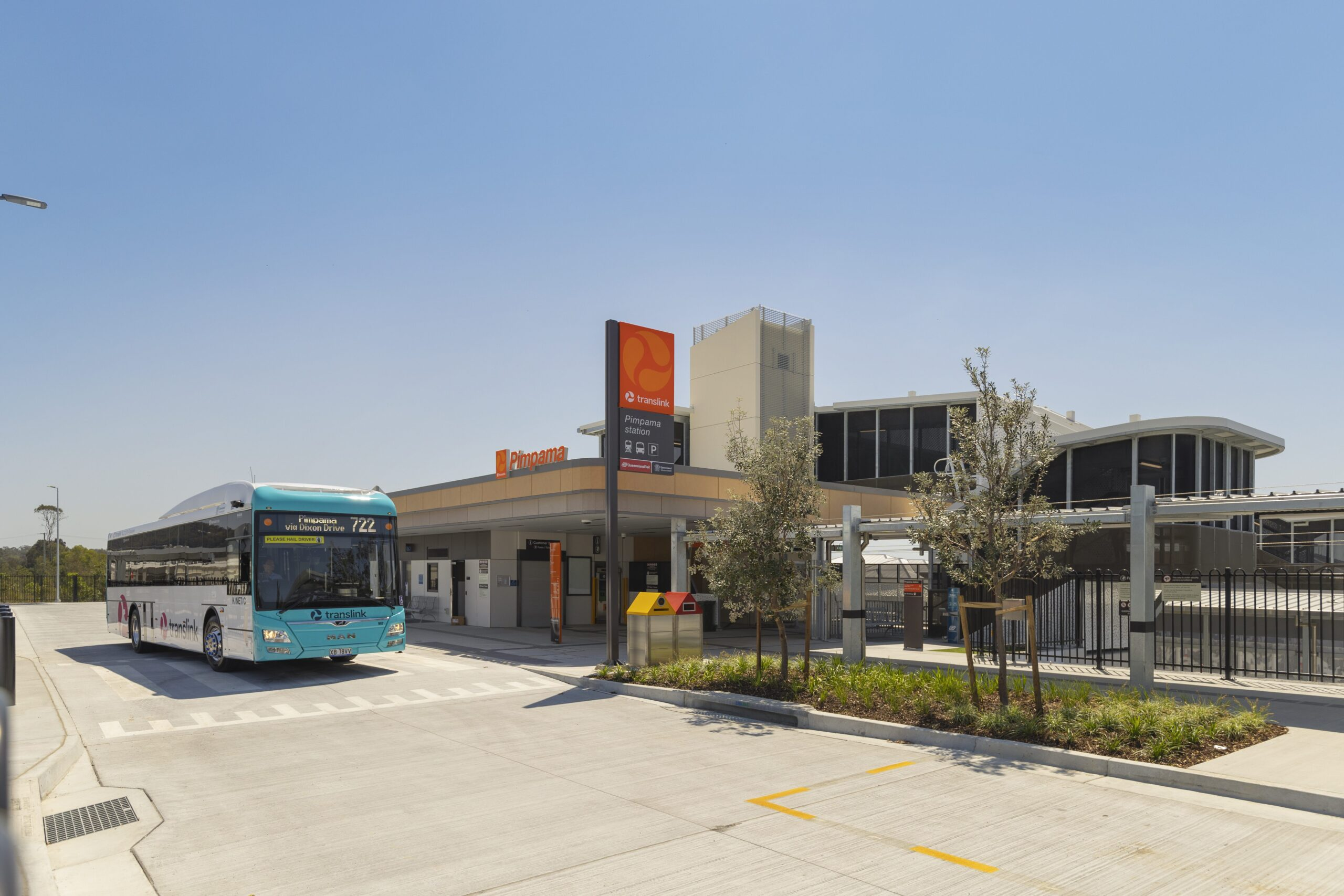
- Pimpama railway station

- Interactive map of Pimpama
- Coordinates: 27.8161°S 153.3177°E
- Country: Australia
- State: Queensland
- City: Gold Coast
- LGA: City of Gold Coast
- Location: 29.5 km (18.3 mi) NNW of Surfers Paradise; 50.9 km (31.6 mi) SSE of Brisbane; 29.8 km (18.5 mi) SE of Logan Central; 54 km (34 mi) NNW of Tweed Heads
- Established: 1860

Government
  - State electorate: Coomera
  - Federal division: Fadden

Area
  - Total: 41.4 km^{2} (16.0 sq mi)
- Elevation: 4 m (13 ft)

Population
  - Total: 24,601 (2021 census)
  - Density: 594.2/km^{2} (1,539.0/sq mi)
- Time zone: UTC+10:00 (AEST)
- Postcode: 4209
Suburbs around Pimpama
Ormeau Hills; Ormeau	Norwell	Jacobs Well
Kingsholme	Pimpama	Southern Moreton Bay Islands
Willow Vale	Upper Coomera	Coomera

Pimpama (/pɪmpɑːmə/ PIM-PAH-mə) is a northern suburb in the City of Gold Coast, Queensland, Australia. The name is of Aboriginal origin. The suburb contains numerous schools with the first opening in the 1870s.

A small farming community grew in the area from the 1860s. It was once a stop for Cobb and Co coach services. Pimpama was the location of the state's first sawmill. Growing arrowroot had become popular from as early as the 1880s. By 1908, the region's arrowroot crop supplied the whole country.

In the 2021 census, Pimpama had a population of 24,601 people.

== Geography ==
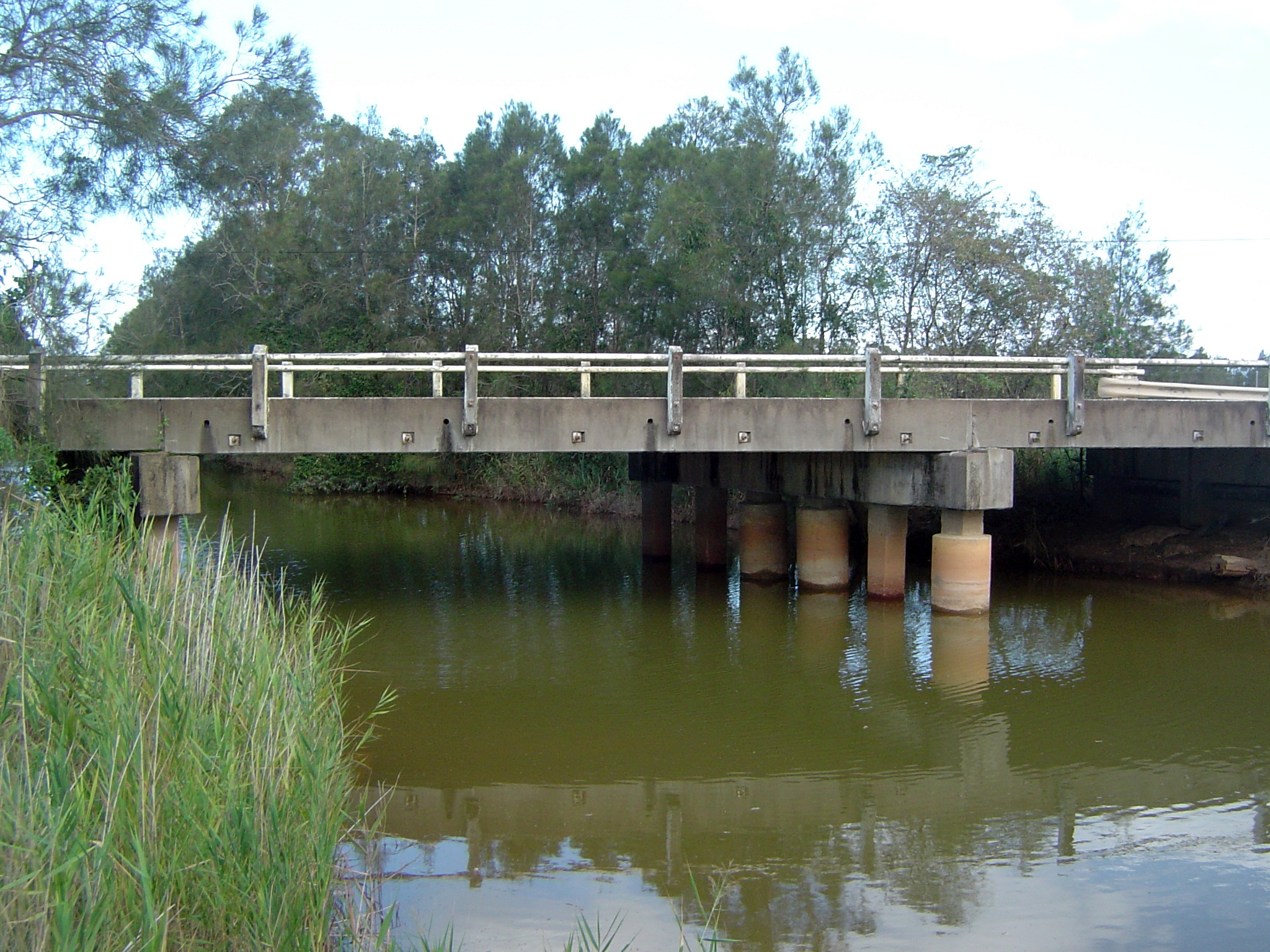
Pimpama River, 2014

Pimpama is located on the Pacific Motorway 29.5 kilometres (18.3 mi) north of Surfers Paradise. The township of Pimpama is the last remaining rural town on the Pacific Motorway between Brisbane and the Gold Coast. It has a large area of undeveloped land. With the urban development of the region, Pimpama's population has had rapid growth, increasing by 92%.

The Pimpama River marks the northern boundary of the suburb, which flows from the Darlington Range at Kingsholme down to Moreton Bay. Hotham Creek also flows through the suburb and meets with Pimpama River to the north-east of the suburb.

== History ==
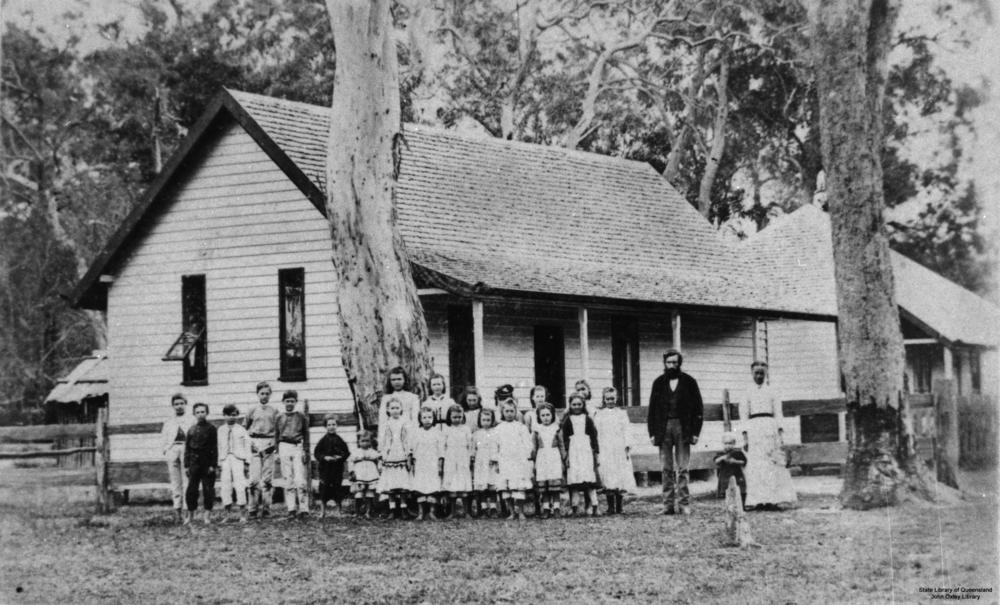
Pimpama State School, 1878

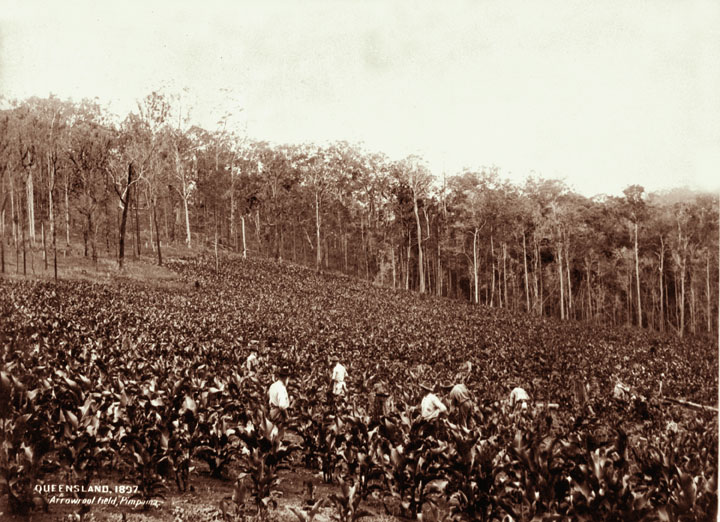
Arrowroot crop, 1897

=== 19th century ===
Yugembah (also known as Yugumbir, Jugambel, Jugambeir, Jugumbir, Jukam, Jukamba) is one of the Australian Aboriginal languages in areas that include the Beenleigh, Beaudesert, Gold Coast, Logan, Scenic Rim, Albert River, Coolangatta, Coomera, Logan River, Pimpama, Tamborine and Tweed River Valley, within the local government boundaries of the City of Gold Coast, City of Logan, Scenic Rim Regional Council and the Tweed River Valley.

The name Pimpama is reportedly derived from the Bundjalung language (Yugumbir dialect), pim pim ba or bim bim ba, meaning place of soldier (mickey) birds.

Much of the Pimpama district had been taken up in the 1850s by William Duckett White of Beau Desert Station, who leased 20,000 acres (81 km^{2}) between the Logan and Coomera Rivers, including upper Hotham Creek (a tributary of Pimpama River), as Pimpama run. A small settlement was established on the Pimpama River c. 1860, but the site was abandoned within a few years in preference to Hotham Creek. Much of Pimpama run was thrown open for selection from April 1869, and White forfeited his remaining leasehold on Pimpama from 1 January 1870. The private subdivision and sale in February 1870 of town and farm lots at the junction of the Pimpama River and Hotham Creek, consolidated Pimpama township and initiated a small farming community of mostly Irish settlers.

In the 1860s, farmers along the Pimpama River experimented firstly with cotton growing, then with sugar, both of which initially were dependent on South Pacific Islands labour.

The first sawmill in South East Queensland was built at Pimpama in 1863 by Jesse Daniells.

Irish-born settlers William Doherty and his wife Eliza Fannon had arrived in Queensland by September 1867. It appears that they were Residents in Brisbane until November 1869 at least, but had moved to the Pimpama district by August 1870, when William Doherty signed a local petition calling for a provisional school to be established in the area. It is not known where in Pimpama the Doherty family lived at this period, but William Doherty worked on a number of local sugar plantations and farms before taking up his own selections in the mid-1870s.

From about 1868, Pimpama was the terminus of Cobb & Co Coach services from Brisbane. As a result of this, two hotels were built on either side of Hotham Creek, neither of which remain today. The route was extended to Nerang in 1882.

The first commercial arrowroot in Pimpama was grown in the late 1860s, and the Lahey family, who moved to Pimpama in 1870 and eventually took up Sunnyside, adjoining William Doherty on Hotham Creek, went into arrowroot cultivation on a large scale, inventing a mechanical processing method which revolutionised the production of arrowroot, and marketing arrowroot under their own brand. The Pimpama selectors of the 1870s, searching for a new commercial crop, discovered that the climate, soil, and abundance of pure water in the Pimpama district were ideal for the cultivation and manufacture of arrowroot. Arrowroot gave about the same return as maize or potatoes, but was more frost, drought and flood resistant. By 1884, arrowroot was widely grown in the Pimpama and Coomera districts, and a number of new manufacturing plants were being established.

Most of the selections along upper Hotham Creek were surveyed in 1871, but not proclaimed for selection until August 1874. In the interim, many farmers were 'squatting' on these selections, with no guarantee that they would ultimately secure the land as leasehold.

Pimpama State School opened on 15 April 1872.

In October 1874, Doherty selected portion 21, parish of Pimpama (158 acres (0.64 km^{2}) of second class pastoral land on Hotham Creek, on which Laurel Hill Farmhouse was later built). The block already contained some improvements, including a slab barn and a small humpy, and about 12 acres (49,000 m^{2}) of scrub cleared and partly under cultivation, for which Doherty paid £20, and was issued with a conditional lease on the property for 10 years from 1 January 1875. At the same time he selected the adjoining portion 31 [135 acres], on which existing improvements comprised a bark-roofed barn, a small slab house, some cleared scrub and a small stockyard. It appears that the Dohertys resided on portion 31 from October 1874 until mid-1879, when they moved to portion 21. In 1879, Doherty also acquired the lease to portion 151, an 84-acre (340,000 m^{2}) block which abutted the eastern boundary of portion 21.

By December 1876, the main Pimpama sugar plantations (Ormeau, Malungmavel, Pimpama and Yahwulpah) had ceased production, and were devoted either to cattle or arrowroot, but some smaller farms in the district continued with sugar growing for several decades.

Podinga Provisional School opened on 5 August 1878. In 1892 it was renamed Ormeau Provisional School. On 1 January it became Ormeau State School.

Laurel Hill Farmhouse, a single-storeyed timber farm house with attic, was erected in 1883-84 for Pimpama arrowroot grower and manufacturer, William Doherty. Laurel Hill Farmhouse was one of the finest residences in the area, being photographed in 1897 by the Queensland Lands Department as a model example of a Queensland home on a selection. The builder was Alexander Fortune of Coomera who had himself been granted 880 acres of crown land for pastoral use.

In January 1884, he obtained title to portions 21 & 31, and embarked on substantial improvements to the property, which he had named Laurel Hill. A fine new house, erected for the Dohertys by Coomera builder Alexander Fortune, was completed by late January 1884. [This is understood to be the existing Laurel Hill Farmhouse.] Fortune, resident in the Coomera district by 1872, was a carpenter by trade, and had erected Coomera State School and an Anglican church at upper Coomera.

At Laurel Hill, William Doherty raised cattle and grew various crops. By 1884 he had between 40 and 50 acres (200,000 m^{2}) under arrowroot, and erected his own factory in the first half of the year. Remnants of this mill survive. Before the turn of the century, he purchased Pimpama Plantation at Ormeau, [approximately 1,150 acres (4.7 km^{2}) which he used for grazing purposes], and c1901 acquired Sunnyside, the Lahey family's substantial arrowroot plantation adjacent to Laurel Hill on Hotham Creek. Following William Doherty's death in 1904, the properties were divided between his three sons: Laurel Hill went to William Alexander [Alex], Sunnyside [renamed Willowvale by the Dohertys] to Thomas, and Pimpama to Robert.

On 24 January 1889, the old South Coast railway line opened from Beenleigh to Southport. Pimpama was served by Pimpama railway station (27.8152°S 153.2921°E). The line and the station closed on 30 June 1964.

=== 20th century ===
By 1908, Queensland farmers on about a dozen farms in the Yatala, Pimpama, Ormeau and Nerang districts, were supplying almost the whole of the arrowroot used in Australia. Doherty Brothers of Hotham Creek and Robert Doherty of Ormeau, with together approximately 100 acres (0.40 km^{2}) under arrowroot [or 50% of the total 200 acres (0.81 km^{2}) under arrowroot in these districts], were among the largest arrowroot growers/producers in Australia. The Willowvale arrowroot mill was moved further downstream on Hotham Creek, closer to the Pacific Highway at Pimpama, and continued production until the mid-1930s. Alex Doherty at Laurel Hill turned to dairying in the early 1920s before retiring to the Gold Coast c1947. Subsequently, the property was purchased by the Miles family of Pimpama, with title to Laurel Hill transferred in 1950. Members of this family resided in the house until mid-October 1997.

The Doherty family were prominent members of the local community, involved in church and civic affairs. William Doherty was a trustee of Pimpama School of Arts and served as a councillor on Coomera Divisional Board from c1887 to c1889. His son Thomas later became chairman of Coomera Shire.

Some changes to the farmhouse were made during the Doherty family's occupation. There is evidence of minor re-arrangement of internal partition walls, and the staircase to the attic has been removed and the stairwell enclosed, possibly in the 1920s. The ceiling linings in several of the rooms may date to the 1920s also. The original kitchen wing reputedly burnt down in the late 1920s, and was replaced with the present kitchen building.

From 1930 onwards, there was a move toward dairy farming in the Pimpama/Willow Vale region; more recently these farms were used for fattening cattle.

=== 21st century ===
Lutheran Ormeau Rivers District School opened on 23 January 2006.

Pimpama State Secondary College opened 1 January 2013.

A Woolworths supermarket opened on 5 July 2014.

Pimpama State Primary College opened 1 January 2015.

King's Christian College opened its second campus in Pimpama in 2015; their first campus opened at Reedy Creek in 1980 and their third campus opened in Chambers Flat in 2020.

Pimpama City Shopping Centre opened in September 2018 and is anchored by Aldi, Coles and Best & Less alongside over 60 speciality shops.

On 17 December 2021, Pimpama Sports Hub opened.

Gainsborough State School commenced construction in March 2020 and opened in January 2021.

== Demographics ==
In the 2016 census, Pimpama had a population of 9,396 people.

In the 2021 census, Pimpama had a population of 24,601 people. The suburb is experiencing the highest growth rate of any suburb outside of capital cities in Australia.

== Heritage listings ==
Pimpama has a number of heritage-listed sites, including:

- Pimpama & Ormeau War Memorial, 246 Creek Street (former Pacific Highway)
- former Pimpama Rifle Range, 193 Rifle Range Road
- Laurel Hill Farmhouse, Ruffles Road, Willow Vale (the farmhouse was historically in Pimpama)

== Urban planning ==
For the twenty years prior to 2010 most of the population of Pimpama was concentrated in the Canowindra estate, located in the north of the suburb. This estate, first developed in the 1980s is often referred to as a suburb itself. Hawthorne Woods, an estate built since 2000 across the motorway from the township also contained a large portion of the population. At this time the hamlet of Pimpama consisted of a general store surrounded by a handful of homes. Some employment was offered by a large sawmill and hardware business, and by the ambulance training station serving the Pacific Motorway. The owners of the general store, Jenny Houston and her son Robert, had enlarged the property to include a bar and a small restaurant.

Extensive and intensive urban development came to Pimpama in the first decade of the 21st century, as a result of planning that had started ten years earlier.

In 1995, the City of Gold Coast Council (GCCC) and the Queensland Government collaborated in staging "The Coomera Charrette Planning Study". By that year, there was general agreement between the Commonwealth Government, the Queensland Government, and the GCCC that in the northern part of the territory administered by the GCCC a new urban area should be created, involving a new city centre based at Coomera, in what had previously been mainly rural land.

This proposal bore similarities to the earlier Robina project in the south, and a justification was that in large parts of the Pimpama/Coomera area there had been rural subdivisions in the 1970s that had created wide many 2-5 hectare parcels, thought to be useless for anything except further subdivision into much smaller lots.

The innovative Charrette method, never before used in Queensland, assembled everyone who at that time had an interest in the development of the area. Participants included local residents and landowners; clubs and associations; land developers; state and federal officials representing road and railway authorities; GCCC personnel involved in planning, sewerage, water, traffic and so on, and many others. The intention was that this diverse group would be put into a ‘pressure cooker’ environment for a week, charged with coming up with overall concept plans for further consideration by the various authorities. It was purely a study, with no executive power.

The Charrette zone straddled the Pacific Highway, with its northern boundary on Hotham Creek and southern boundary on the Coomera river. The total area was over 5,000 hectares, comprising at the time 1207 separate rateable properties in 603 different ownerships. The GCCC Local Area Plans that flowed eventually from the Charrette - pretty closely following its recommendations - comprised one of the largest re-zonings in south-east Queensland, intended to house 66,000 people.

It was held during the week of 28 June to 3 July 1995. The Charrette leader was Professor Paul Murrain, a highly regarded English urban planning consultant who was imported for the occasion and proved an inspirational speaker.

The Charrette process sent a signal to anyone who was paying attention that in due course there would indeed be large-scale rezoning in the Pimpama district. Land developers (the word speculator is also applicable) moved in and a great many properties changed hands before any official rezoning took place, in many cases leading to the consolidation of large parcels. One of the leading developers to emerge in Pimpama was Mirvac Ltd., who acquired a very large tract running along the northern side of Yawalpah Road practically for its entire length (at the time) including the Gainsborough Greens golf course and several farms.

Significant construction works moved ahead in and around Coomera (which had sewerage connections to the existing Coombabah facility) but similar activity in Pimpama had to await environmental studies associated with the construction of the Pimpama Waste Water Treatment Plant, which was not begun until 2006. The completion of Stage 1 late in 2008, with associated trunk sewers, signalled the launch of a spate of housing subdivisions.

== Tourism ==
Pimpama is home to a few tourist attractions. The Strawberry Farm is a working farm located in the township. It is home to a variety of animals, as well as a kiosk. The Le Mans complex contains Australia's only Zorb course, as well as a go-kart track.

Gainsborough Greens, a golf course is also located in the suburb. Another golf course, Pacific Springs was partly demolished to make way for the Pacific Motorway upgrade in the early 2000s. Remains of the course, as well as the street formerly accessing the course still exist, west of the Hotham Creek crossing of the motorway.

== Education ==
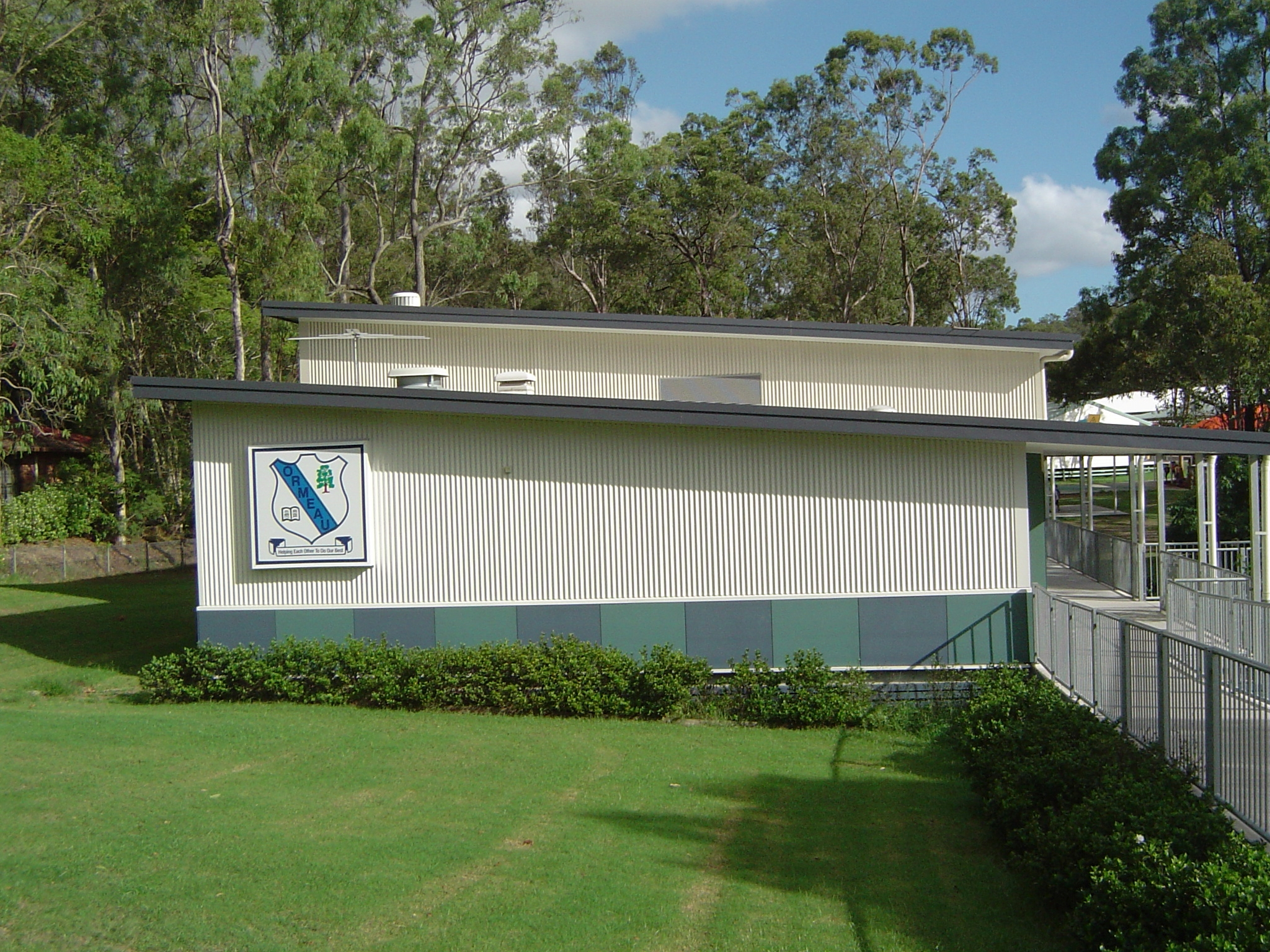
Ormeau state school, 2014

Pimpama State School is a government primary (Prep–6) school for boys and girls at 9 Hotham Creek Road North (27.8171°S 153.2785°E). In 2017, the school had an enrolment of 639 students with 48 teachers (42 full-time equivalent) and 24 non-teaching staff (13 full-time equivalent). It includes a special education program.

Pimpama State Primary College is a government primary (Prep–6) school for boys and girls at Cunningham Drive North (27.8333°S 153.3222°E). In 2017, the school had an enrolment of 631 students with 40 teachers (38 full-time equivalent) and 22 non-teaching staff (12 full-time equivalent). It includes a special education program.

Ormeau State School is a government primary (Prep–6) school for boys and girls at 29 Mirambeena Drive (27.7999°S 153.2766°E) in the Canowindra estate. In 2017, the school had an enrolment of 892 students with 65 teachers (55 full-time equivalent) and 27 non-teaching staff (20 full-time equivalent). It includes a special education program.

Gainsborough State School is a government primary (Prep–6) school on the corner of Yawalpah Road and Gawthern Drive. In 2024, the school had an enrolment of 751 students with 51 teachers (48 full-time equivalent) and 31 non-teaching staff (24 full-time equivalent). The school is planned to cater for up to 1,200 students.

King's Christian College is a private primary and high school (Pre–Prep to 12). It has one campus in Pimpama with two others at Reedy Creek and Logan Village. The Pimpama campus is at 198 Pimpama-Jacobs Well Road (27.8074°S 153.2953°E).

Lutheran Ormeau Rivers District School is a private primary and secondary (Prep–12) school for boys and girls at 68 Mirambeena Drive (27.8008°S 153.2859°E). In 2017, the school had an enrolment of 525 students with 37 teachers (35 full-time equivalent) and 26 non-teaching staff (19 full-time equivalent).

Pimpama State Secondary College is a government secondary (7–12) school for boys and girls at Dixon Drive (27.8344°S 153.3184°E). In 2017, the school had an enrolment of 1,362 students with 103 teachers (100 full-time equivalent) and 46 non-teaching staff (38 full-time equivalent). It includes a special education.

== Transport ==
Pimpama railway station opened on Monday 20 October 2025 as part of the Cross River Rail project. The suburb is serviced by the Queensland Rail City network and is bisected by the M1 Motorway.

== Amenities ==
The Gold Coast City Council operates a fortnightly mobile library service which visits Pimpama State School in Hotham Creek Road and Lords School, Mirambeena Drive.

== See also ==
- List of Gold Coast suburbs
