= Pimpama River =

Pimpama
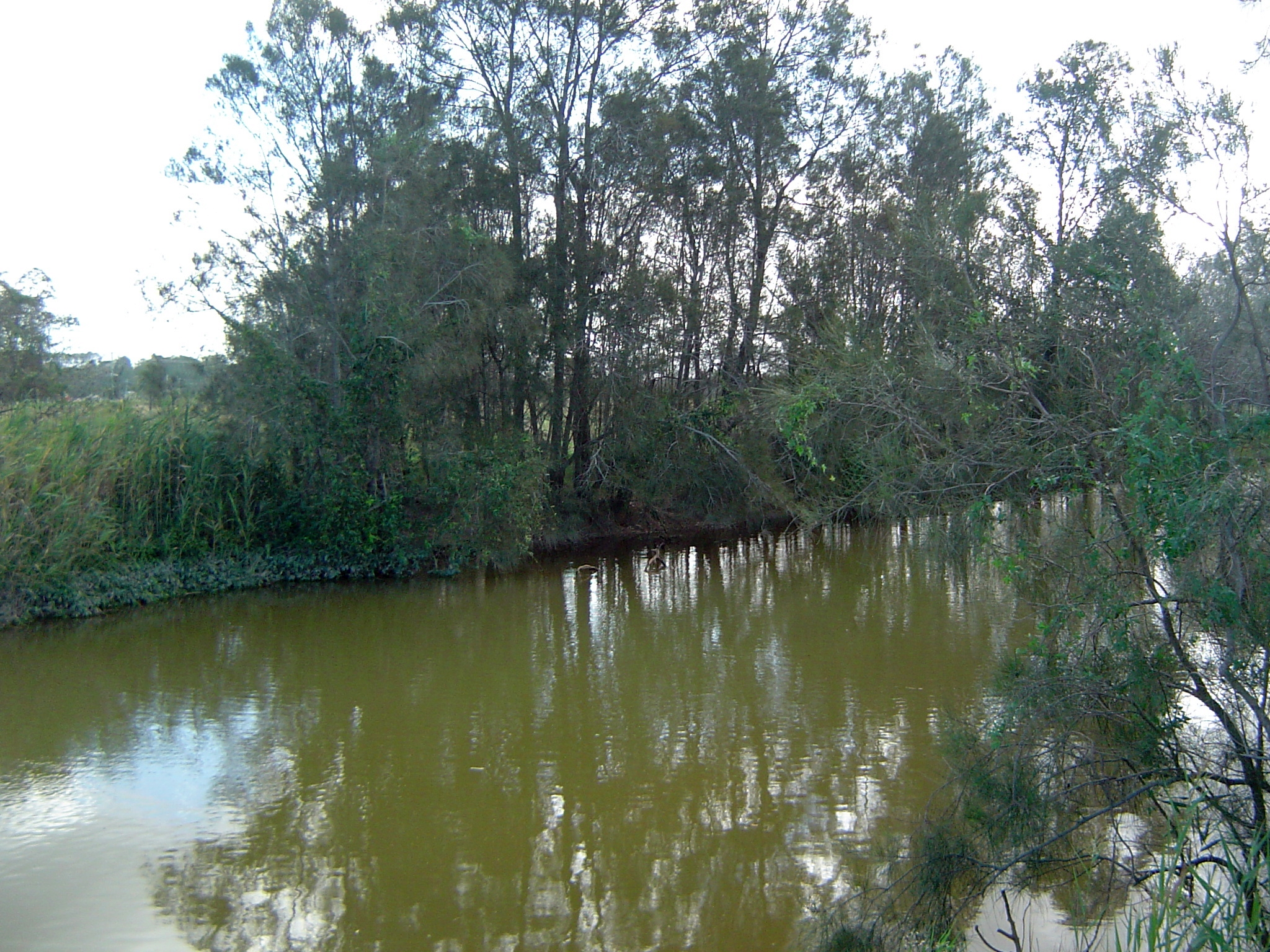
- The Pimpama River at Pimpama, 2014

- Location of the Pimpama River river mouth in Queensland

Location
- Country: Australia
- State: Queensland
- Region: South East Queensland
- Local government area: City of Gold Coast

Physical characteristics
- Source: Darlington Range
  - location: west of Willow Vale
  - coordinates: 27°49′14″S 153°13′59″E
  - elevation: 350 m (1,150 ft)
- Mouth: Tipplers Passage
  - location: south of Jacobs Well
  - coordinates: 27°47′54″S 153°21′49″E
  - elevation: 0 m (0 ft)
- Length: 80 km (50 mi)
- Basin size: 489 km^{2} (189 sq mi)

Basin features
- River system: Gold Coast Broadwater
- Tributaries
  - right: Hotham Creek, McCoys Creek
- National park: Southern Moreton Bay Islands National Park

The Pimpama River is a perennial river in the South East region of Queensland, Australia. Its catchment lies within the Gold Coast local government area and covers an area of 171 square kilometres (66 sq mi).

== Course and features ==
The Pimpama River rises in the Darlington Range on the north-western slopes of Wongawallan Mountain, west of Willow Vale in the Gold Coast hinterland. The river flows generally north-easterly, joined by two minor tributaries before emptying into Tipplers Passage where it is joined by the North Branch of the Coomera River in the Southern Moreton Bay Islands National Park and south of Woogoompah Island. From here the river forms its confluence with the Broadwater, part of the southern Moreton Bay and enters the Coral Sea either south or north of South Stradbroke Island.

The catchment area of the Pimpama River is bounded by the Logan and Albert rivers catchment to the north, the Coomera River catchment to the south and the Broadwater in the east. The name of the river was the source for the naming of nearby Pimpama. The Pacific Motorway crosses the river between Kingsholme and Ormeau. The Gold Coast railway line crosses to the east between Pimpama and Ormeau.

A conservation area is located on the southern bank of the river at its junction with Moreton Bay, bordering the Southern Moreton Bay Island National Park and the Ramsar wetland site. The Pimpama River wetlands has mangroves, saltmarshs and marine flats providing protected breeding grounds for marine species including four frog species and the vulnerable false water rat (Xeromys myoides). The wetlands are an important conservation area for a recorded 184 species of native plants, 134 vertebrate fauna species including 13 species of mammals, 108 species of birds and nine species of reptiles.

== History ==
Like most other coastal rivers in the region, the river was used to transport timber cut during the 19th century. The fertile delta area of the river centered on Jacobs Well was home to a thriving arrowroot crop. Growing sugarcane has become the area's main land use.

A bridge was first constructed over the Pimpama River between late 1871 and early 1872 by John Thomas Brigg.

In 2015, the remains of Tiahleigh Palmer were found in the river.

== See also ==
- List of rivers of Australia § Queensland
