= Electoral district of Coomera =

State electoral district of Queensland, Australia

Coomera Queensland—Legislative Assembly
- Electoral map of Coomera 2017
- State: Queensland
- Dates current: 2009–present
- MP: Michael Crandon
- Party: Liberal National Party
- Namesake: Coomera
- Electors: 45,715 (2020)
- Area: 340 km^{2} (131.3 sq mi)
- Demographic: Outer-metropolitan
- Coordinates: 27°49′S 153°19′E
Electorates around Coomera:
Macalister	Macalister	Redlands
Logan	Coomera	Broadwater
Scenic Rim	Theodore	Broadwater

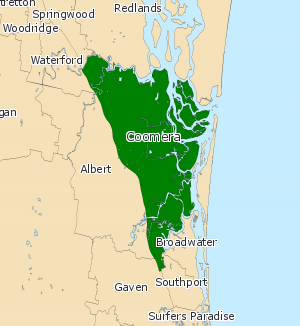
Electoral map of Coomera 2008

Coomera is an electoral district of the Legislative Assembly in the Australian state of Queensland, based at the northern end of the Gold Coast. The seat has been held by the Liberal National Party since its establishment in 2009.

== Geography ==
A coastal suburban electorate, Coomera lies entirely east of the Pacific Motorway. It includes the City of Gold Coast suburbs of Hope Island, Jacobs Well, Steiglitz and parts of Coomera, Ormeau and Pimpama. It also includes the Logan City suburb of Eagleby.

== History ==
A new district created for the 2009 state election to accommodate the Gold Coast's urban growth, Coomera was in large part drawn from the eastern half of the district of Albert, which was significantly reduced in size. The southern end of Coomera also includes parts previously belonging to the districts of Broadwater and Gaven. Its inaugural member is Michael Crandon of the Liberal National Party.

== Members for Coomera ==
Member	Party	Term
Michael Crandon	Liberal National	2009–present

== Election results ==
2024 Queensland state election: Coomera
Party	Candidate	Votes	%	±%
Liberal National	Michael Crandon	19,108	44.35	+4.38
Labor	Chris Johnson	11,897	27.61	−8.69
One Nation	Nick Muir	4,575	10.62	+2.30
Greens	Stuart Fletcher	2,847	6.61	−1.61
Legalise Cannabis	Suzette Luyken	2,667	6.19	+6.19
Family First	Nathan O'Brien	1,993	4.62	+4.62
Total formal votes		43,087	95.16	+0.06
Informal votes		2,193	4.84	−0.06
Turnout		45,280	84.03	−0.30
Two-party-preferred result
Liberal National	Michael Crandon	25,866	60.03	+8.95
Labor	Chris Johnson	17,221	39.97	−8.95
Liberal National hold		Swing	+8.95	

Primary vote results in Coomera (Parties that have never gotten 5% of the vote are omitted)
Liberal National
Labor
Greens
One Nation
Palmer United/United Australia Party
Katter's Australian
View source data.
Two-party-preferred vote vote results in Coomera View source data.
