= Luscombe, Queensland =

Luscombe Gold Coast City, Queensland
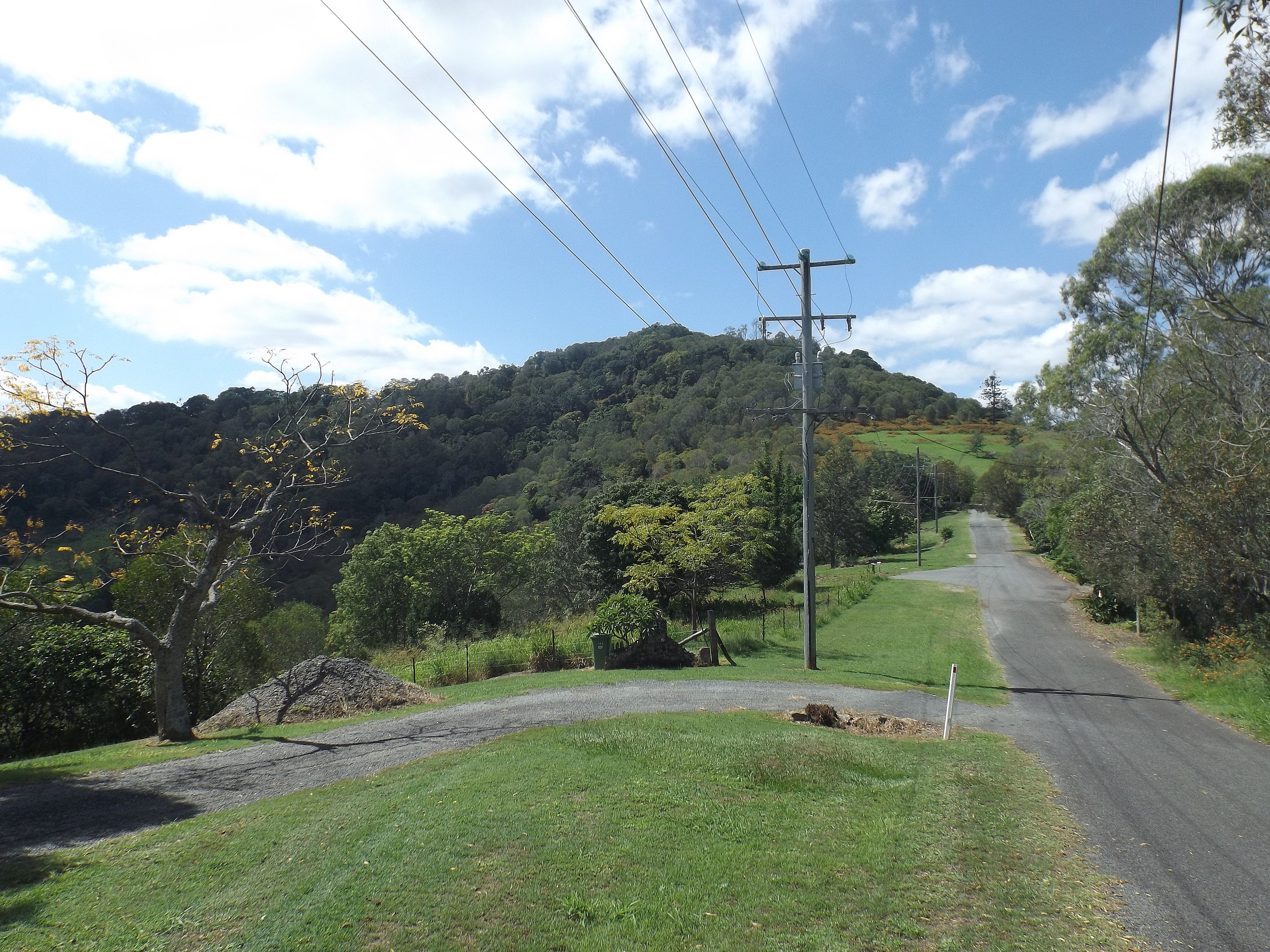
- Needham Road, 2016

- Coordinates: 27.7894°S 153.2024°E
- Population: 265 (2021 census)
  - Density: 15.59/km^{2} (40.37/sq mi)
- Postcode(s): 4207
- Area: 17.0 km^{2} (6.6 sq mi)
- Time zone: AEST (UTC+10:00)
- Location: 42.7 km (27 mi) NW of Southport; 45 km (28 mi) NW of Surfers Paradise; 45.9 km (29 mi) SSE of Brisbane CBD
- LGA(s): City of Gold Coast
- State electorate(s): Coomera
- Federal division(s): Forde
Suburbs around Luscombe:
Wolffdene	Bannockburn; Yatala	Ormeau
Wolffdene	Luscombe	Ormeau Hills
Cedar Creek	Cedar Creek	Kingsholme

Luscombe is a rural locality in the City of Gold Coast, Queensland, Australia. In the 2021 census, Luscombe had a population of 265 people.

== Geography ==
The eastern boundary of Luscombe follows the Albert River. Several large quarries are located in the north and east of the locality.

Davis Hill is located in the east of the suburb on the border with Ormeau Hills. It reaches a height of 298m, and has a radio mast at the summit.

The Beaudesert–Beenleigh Road runs through the south-west corner.

== History ==
The Darlington Park Raceway was a 1.3-kilometre (0.81 mi) go-kart racing track. It was used for an assignment on the third season of The Mole. The raceway was shut down on 3 February 2007 after residents complained to the council about excessive noise. The raceway was located on the western side of Peachey Road near Stanmore Road (27.7661°S 153.2154°E), now replaced by the Darlington Park Industrial Estate.

== Demographics ==
In the 2011 census, Luscombe had a population of 448 people.

In the 2016 census, Luscombe had a population of 307 people.

In the 2021 census, Luscombe had a population of 265 people.

== Education ==
There are no schools in Luscombe. The nearest government primary schools are Cedar Creek State School in neighbouring Cedar Creek to the south, Windaroo State School in Mount Warren Park to the north, Ormeau State School in Pimpama to the east, and Norfolk Village State School in Ormeau to the north-east. The nearest government secondary schools are Windaroo Valley State High School in Bahrs Scrub to the north and Ormeau Woods State High School in Ormeau to the east.

== Amenities ==
There are a number of parks in the area:

- Halls Road East Parklands (27.7979°S 153.1830°E)
- Halls Road Reserve (27.7850°S 153.1893°E)
- Halls Road South Reserve (27.7935°S 153.1831°E)
- Luscombe Reserve East (27.7653°S 153.2107°E)
