= Wolffdene, Queensland =

Suburb of Logan City, Queensland, Australia

Wolffdene
- Suburb
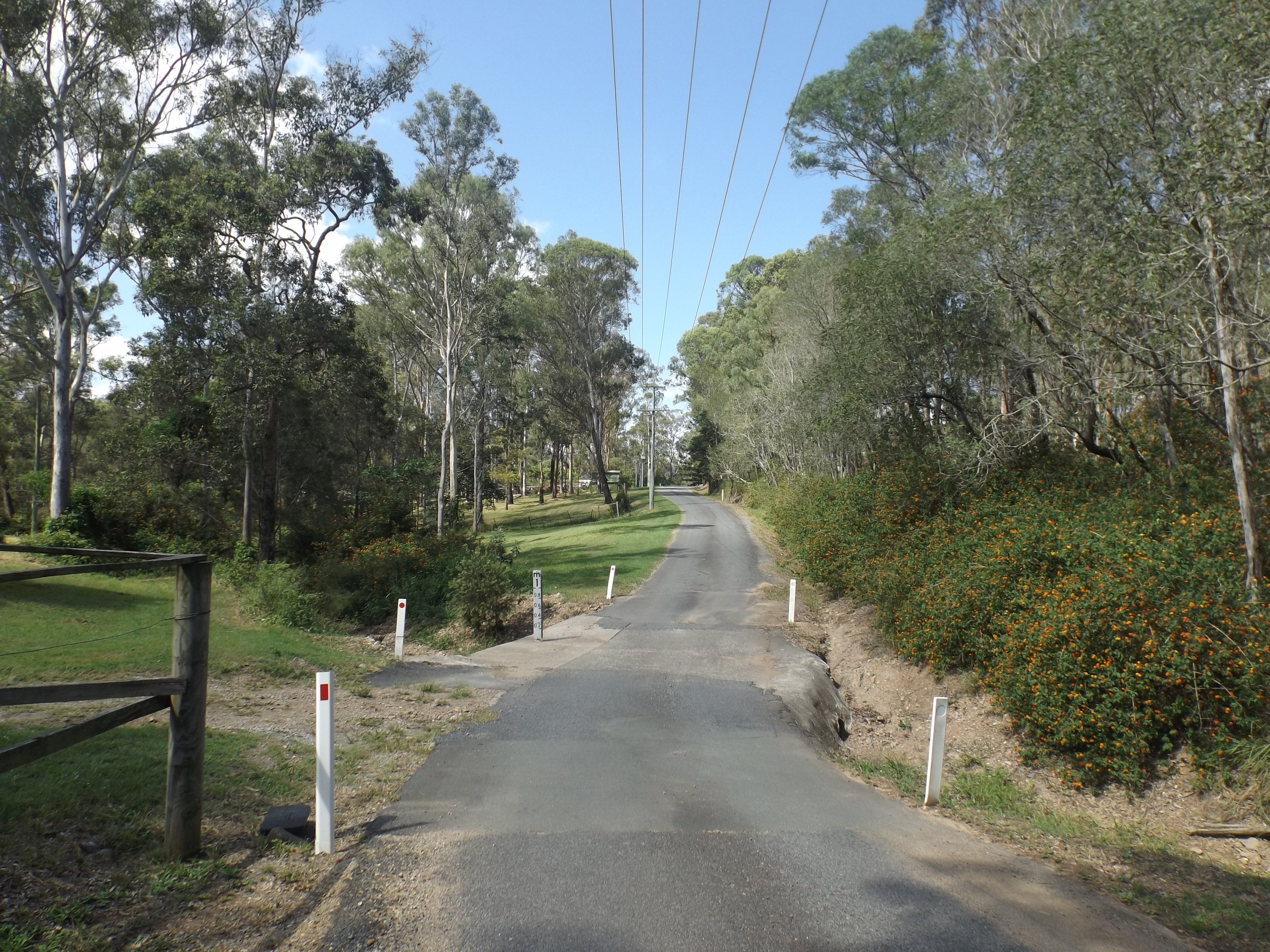
- Wickham Road, 2016

- Interactive map of Wolffdene
- Coordinates: 27.7805°S 153.1741°E
- Country: Australia
- State: Queensland
- LGA: Logan City
- Location: 7.8 km (4.8 mi) S of Beenleigh; 26.4 km (16.4 mi) SE of Logan Central; 45.2 km (28.1 mi) S of Brisbane CBD

Government
  - State electorate: Logan
  - Federal division: Forde

Area
  - Total: 11.1 km^{2} (4.3 sq mi)

Population
  - Total: 266 (2021 census)
  - Density: 23.96/km^{2} (62.1/sq mi)
- Time zone: UTC+10:00 (AEST)
- Postcode: 4207
Suburbs around Wolffdene
Buccan	Belivah; Bannockburn	Yatala
Logan Village	Wolffdene	Luscombe
Cedar Creek	Cedar Creek	Luscombe

Wolffdene is a rural locality in the City of Logan, Queensland, Australia. In the 2021 census, Wolffdene had a population of 266 people.

== Geography ==
The locality is bounded to the east by the Albert River.

The Beaudesert–Beenleigh Road runs through from south-east to north-east.

== History ==
Belivah Provisional School opened circa 1874 and classes were held in a church. In September 1891, the residents were agitating to relocate the school to a location closer to where more children lived, but Queensland Government did not wish to pay for a new provisional school. In March 1892, the residents commenced the construction of a new school themselves and the Queensland Government agreed to contribute £37 to complete the building. It was renamed Wolffdene Provisional School. On 1 January 1909, it became Wolffdene State School. It closed in 1935 but re-opened 15 February 1939. It closed permanently on 31 August 1942. It was located at 810 Beaudesert Beenleigh Road (27.7838°S 153.1862°E).

In 1989, the Goss Government rejected a proposal to build Wolffdene Dam on the Albert River. Later, a dam near Glendower Homestead was once planned in a Queensland Government water strategy report from 1990. The option was discarded after it was revealed the site was too costly to build a dam for the amount of water it would have provided.

== Demographics ==
In the 2011 census, Wolffdene had a population of 292 people.

In the 2016 census, Wolffdene had a population of 288 people.

In the 2021 census, Wolffdene had a population of 266 people.

== Education ==
There are no schools in Wolffdene. The nearest government schools are Windaroo State School in Mount Warren Park to the north and Cedar Creek State School in Cedar Creek to the south. The nearest government secondary school is Windaroo Valley State High School in Bahrs Scrub to the north.
