= Cedar Creek, Queensland (Logan & Gold Coast) =

Cedar Creek Queensland
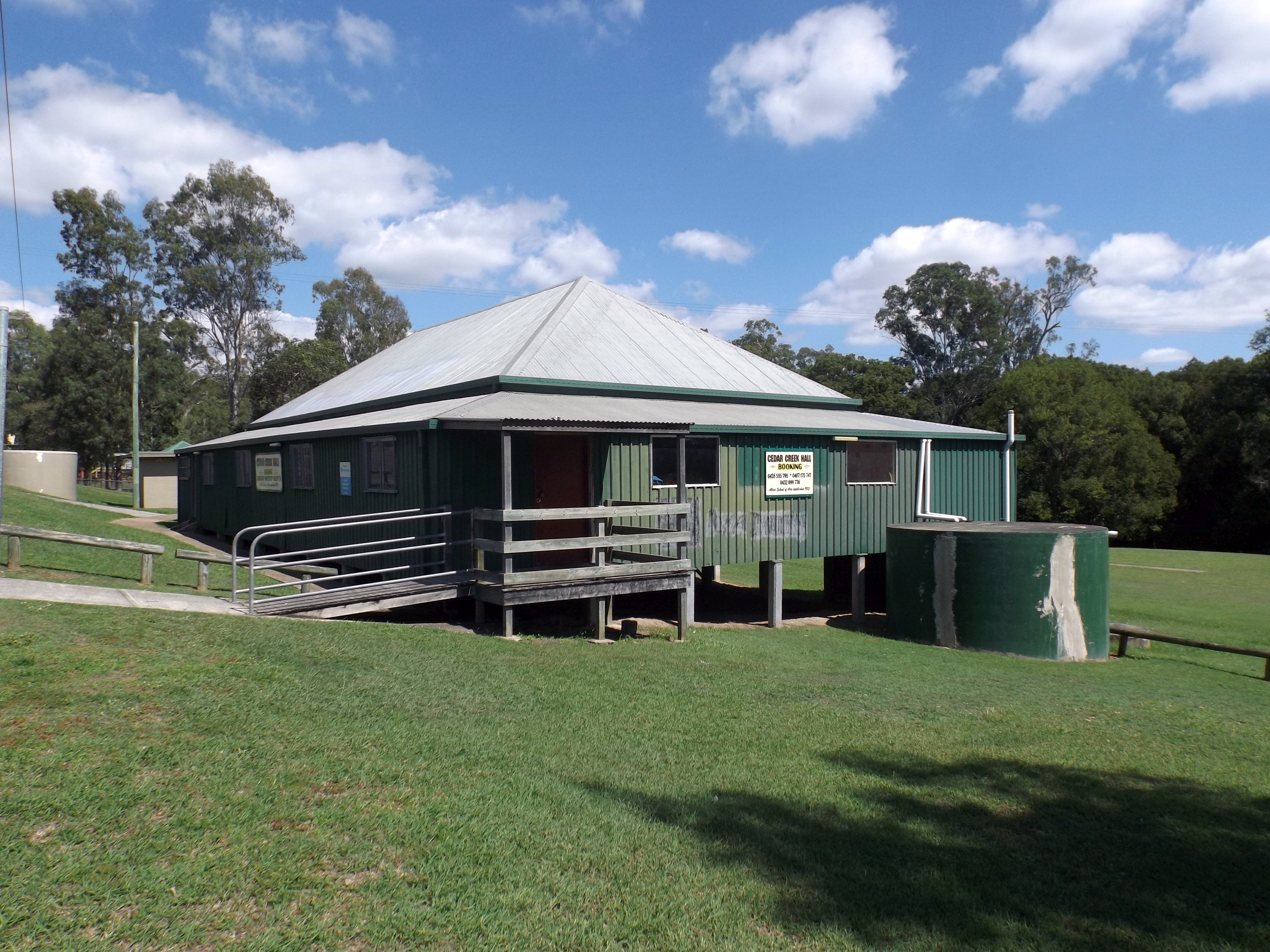
- Cedar Creek Hall, 2106

- Coordinates: 27.8494°S 153.1974°E
- Population: 861 (2021 census)
  - Density: 22.25/km^{2} (57.62/sq mi)
- Postcode(s): 4207
- Area: 38.7 km^{2} (14.9 sq mi)
- Time zone: AEST (UTC+10:00)
- Location: 28.9 km (18 mi) S of Logan Central; 47.3 km (29 mi) NW of Southport; 50.5 km (31 mi) NW of Surfers Paradise; 51.5 km (32 mi) S of Brisbane CBD
- LGA(s): City of Gold Coast; Logan City
- State electorate(s): Logan; Coomera
- Federal division(s): Forde; Wright
Suburbs around Cedar Creek:
Logan Village	Wolffdene	Luscombe
Yarrabilba; Kairabah	Cedar Creek	Kingsholme
Tamborine	Tamborine Mountain	Wongawallan

Cedar Creek is a locality split between City of Gold Coast and Logan City in Queensland, Australia. In the 2021 census, Cedar Creek had a population of 861 people.

== Geography ==
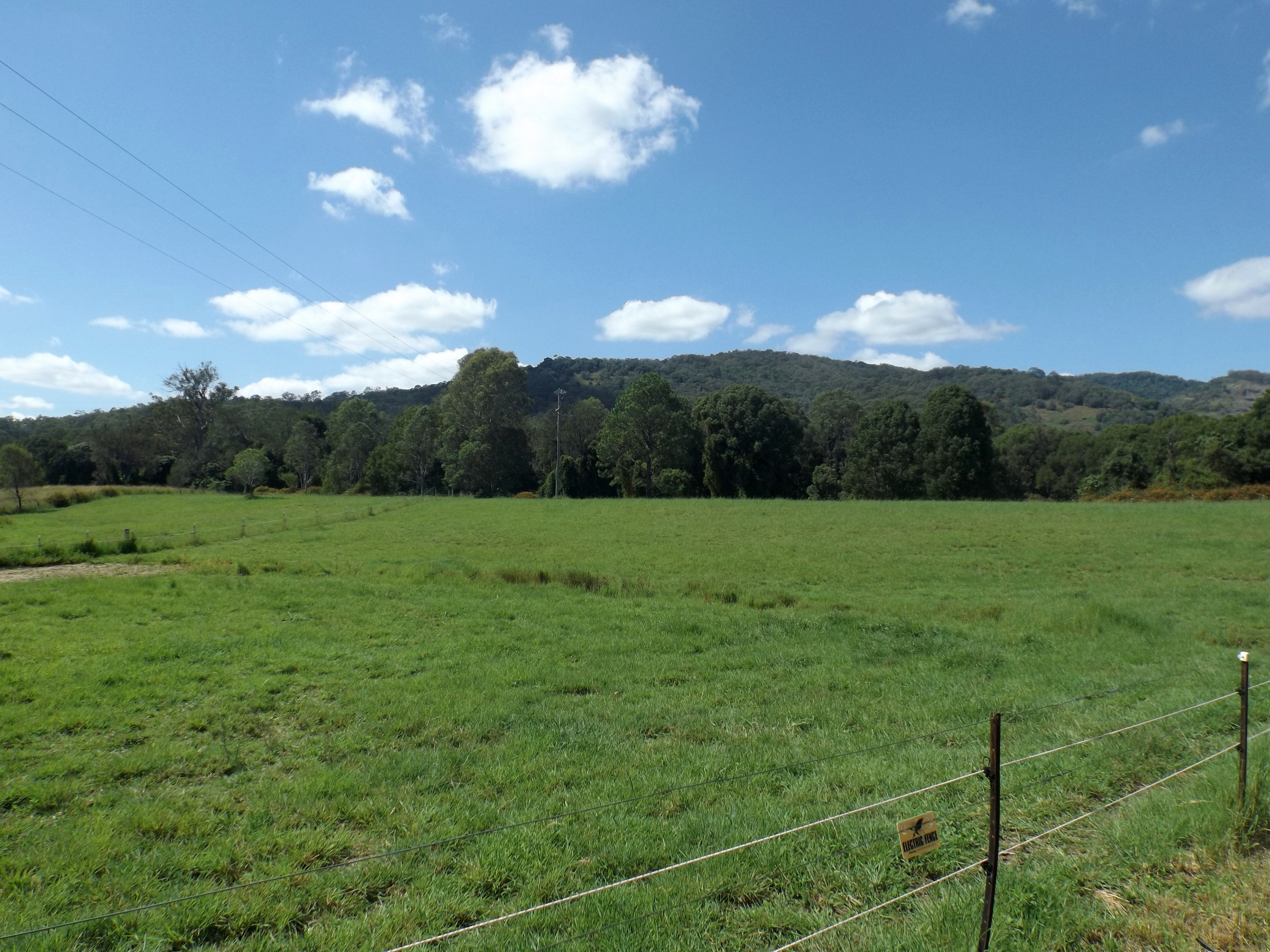
Paddocks along Chardon Bridge Road, 2016

The locality is located about 41 kilometres (25 mi) south-southeast of Brisbane, Queensland's capital city.

The Beaudesert–Beenleigh Road runs through from south to north.

== History ==
The first European settler in the district was Jessie Daniells who established a timber mill in the area in 1864. Most of the early farmers in the district grew sugar cane. David Veivers established a dairy in the 1870s.

Cedar Creek Wesleyan Methodist Church was established in 1871 on the property of Mr Bowser at the junction of Cedar Creek and Albert River (27.835152°S 153.173°E). It was not listed as an active church in 1882 and has been demolished.

The Cedar Creek Vested School opened on 21 September 1874 with 48 pupils under headmaster T.F. Williams (vested meant the school was funded by the Queensland Government) on 2 acres (0.81 ha) of land. William Fowles became the headmaster in 1875. In 1876, the school was enlarged to 12 acres (4.9 ha). In 1888, it became Cedar Creek State School, but low student numbers reduced it to Cedar Creek Provisional School in 1892. In 1895, it became Cedar Creek State School again. In 1913, 2 acres (0.81 ha) of land were given up to be used for a School of Arts. The diamond jubilee celebrations were held in December 1934 and were attended by Members of the Queensland Legislative Assembly, Reginald King (Member for Logan) and Thomas Flood Plunkett (Member for Albert). At that time there were less than 25 students. In 2014, there are about 240 students enrolled.

The Cedar Creek School of Arts was erected in December 1913 by the Upper Albert branch of the Farmers' Union.

Formerly in the Shire of Beaudesert, Cedar Creek became split between Logan City and City of Gold Coast following the local government amalgamations in March 2008. Parts of Cedar Creek were to be taken up by the waters of the proposed but never completed Wolffdene Dam.

== Demographics ==
In the 2011 census, Cedar Creek had a population of 832 people.

In the 2016 census, Cedar Creek had a population of 838 people.

In the 2021 census, Cedar Creek had a population of 861 people.

== Education ==
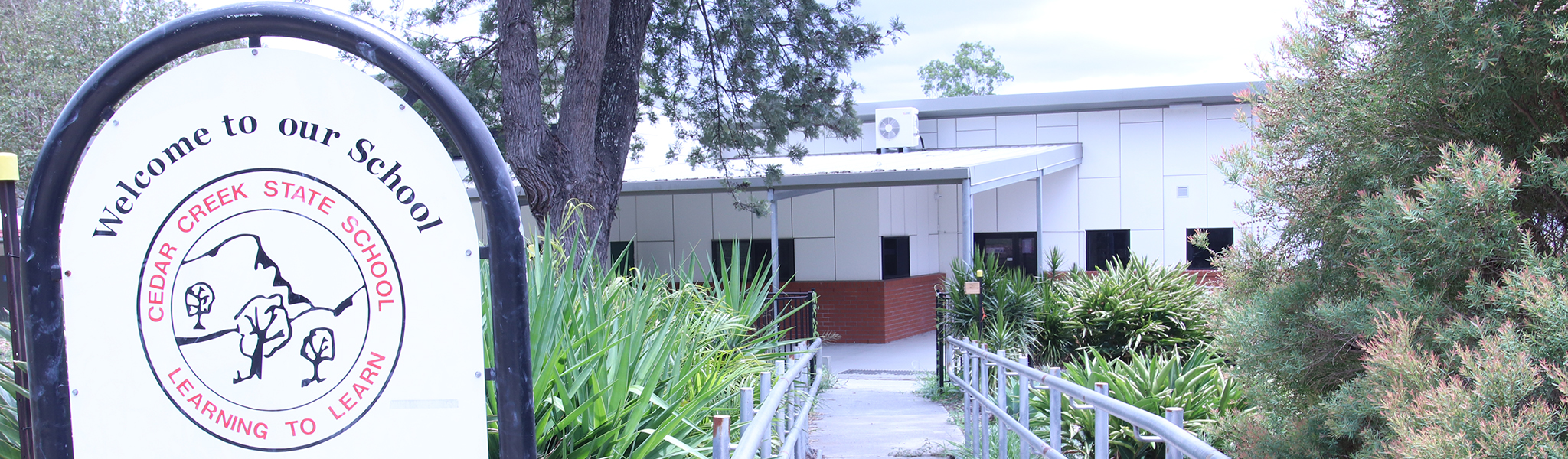
Entrance to Cedar Creek State School, 2019

Cedar Creek State School is a government primary (Prep-6) school for boys and girls at 1a Chardon Bridge Road (27.8275°S 153.1792°E). In 2018, the school had an enrolment of 230 students with 19 teachers (17 full-time equivalent) and 18 non-teaching staff (10 full-time equivalent). It includes a special education program.

There are no secondary schools in Cedar Creek. The nearest government secondary schools are Windaroo Valley State High School in Bahrs Scrub to the north and Tamborine Mountain State High School in neighbouring Tamborine Mountain to the south.

== Facilities ==
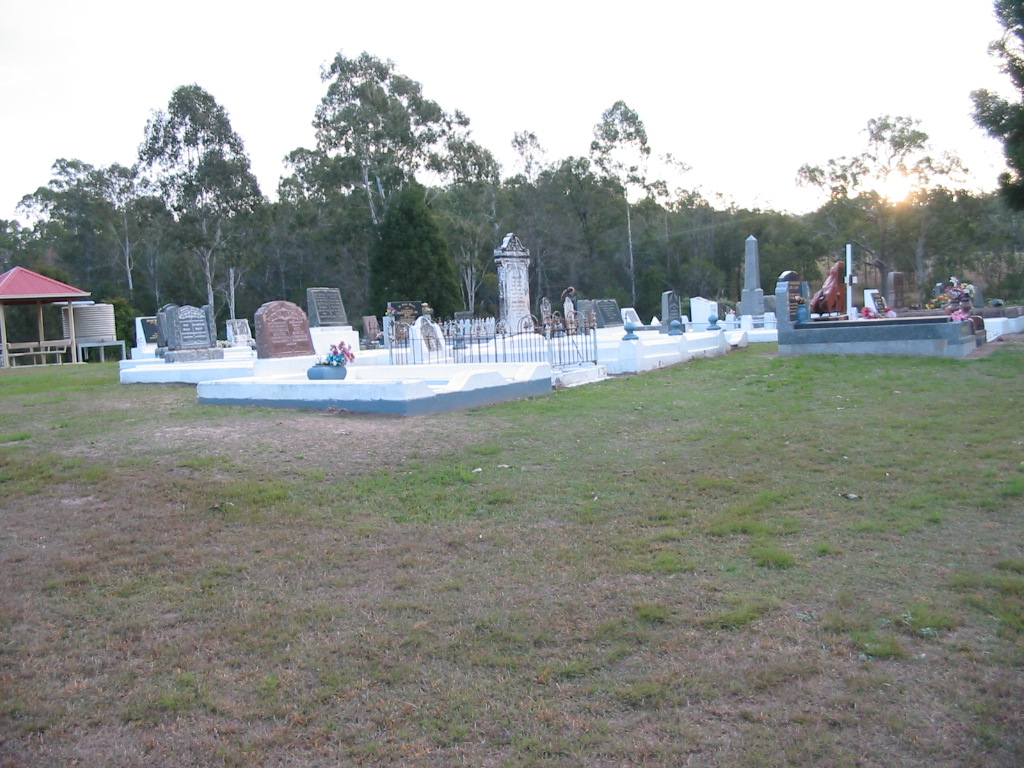
Parkhouse Cemetery, 2005

Parkhouse Cemetery is on Veivers Road (27.8112°S 153.1697°E).

== Amenities ==
Cedar Creek Hall is on the corner of Beenleigh-Beaudesert Road and Chardon Bridge Road (27.8268°S 153.1795°E).

The Gold Coast City Council operates a fortnightly mobile library service which visits Cedar Creek State School on Beenleigh-Beaudesert Road.

There are a number of parks in the locality, including:

- Cedar Creek Conservation Area (27.8470°S 153.1912°E)
- Cedar Creek Parklands (27.8166°S 153.1819°E)
- Chardon Bridge Park (27.8245°S 153.1810°E)
- Howard Creek Reserve (27.8654°S 153.2155°E)
- Little Cedar Creek Reserve (27.8443°S 153.1884°E)
- Lower Cedar Creek Parklands (27.8356°S 153.1751°E)
- Plunkett Road Park (27.8312°S 153.1732°E)
- Rocky Creek Conservation Area (27.8232°S 153.2105°E)
- Rowe Reserve (27.8580°S 153.2060°E)
- Schmidt Road Parklands (27.8251°S 153.1943°E)
- Tamaree Reserve (27.8363°S 153.1838°E)
- Tamborine Oxenford Rd Bend Reserve (27.8772°S 153.2145°E)
- Tamborine Recreation Reserve (27.8953°S 153.1985°E)
- Upper Ormeau Conservation Area (27.8466°S 153.2142°E)
