= Yatala, Queensland =

Yatala
- Suburb
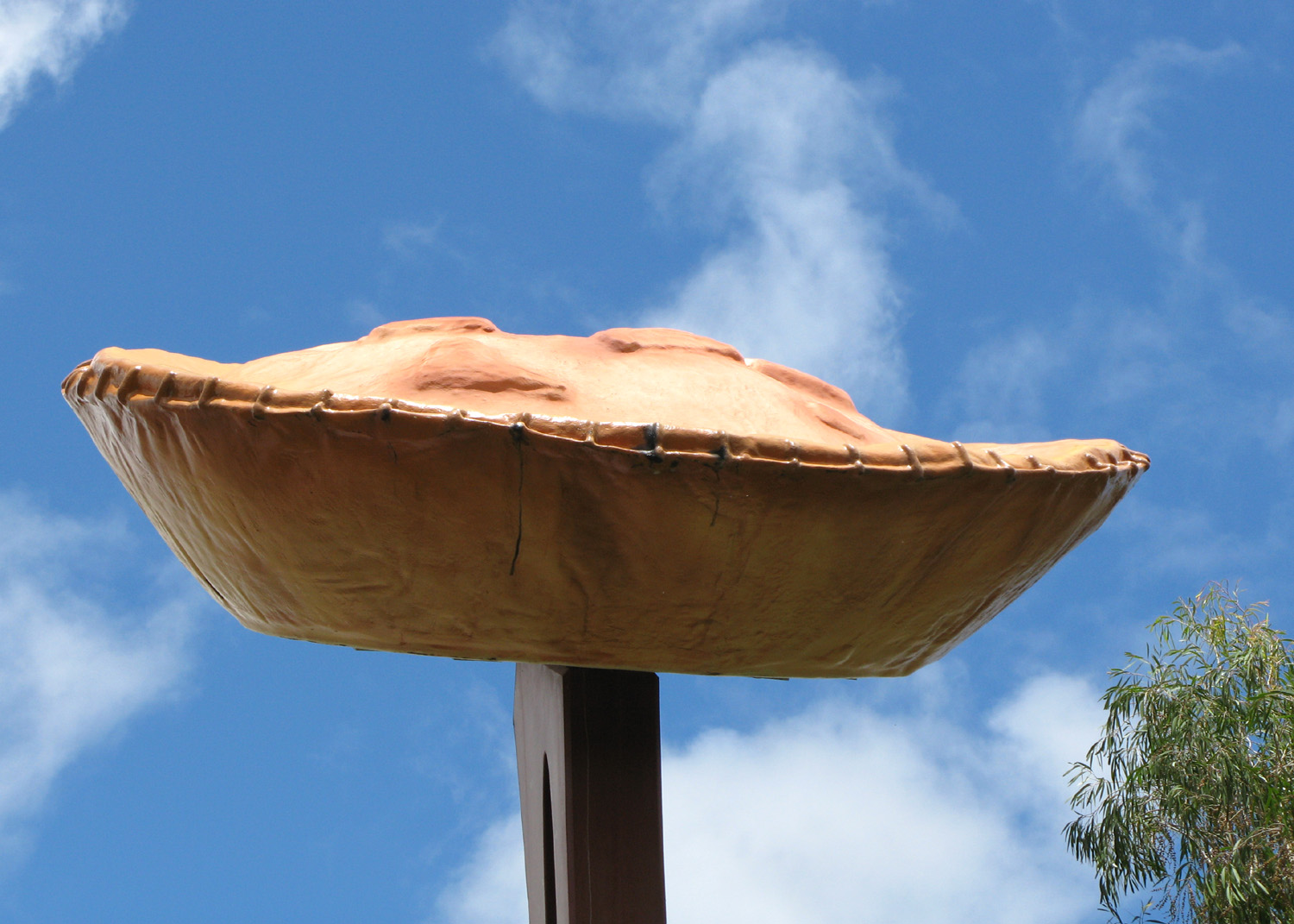
- The Big Pie sign at Yatala Pies (2008)

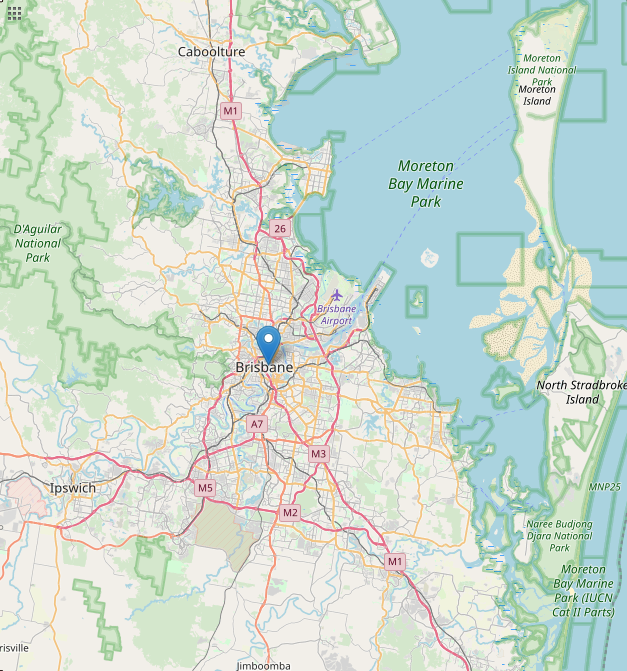
- Interactive map of Yatala
- Coordinates: 27.7511°S 153.2174°E
- Country: Australia
- State: Queensland
- City: Gold Coast City
- LGA: City of Gold Coast
- Location: 6.7 km (4.2 mi) SE of Beenleigh; 35.7 km (22.2 mi) NW of Southport; 38.8 km (24.1 mi) NW of Surfers Paradise; 39.9 km (24.8 mi) SE of Brisbane CBD

Government
  - State electorate: Coomera
  - Federal division: Forde

Area
  - Total: 14.0 km^{2} (5.4 sq mi)

Population
  - Total: 1,405 (2021 census)
  - Density: 100.4/km^{2} (259.9/sq mi)
- Time zone: UTC+10:00 (AEST)
- Postcode: 4207
Suburbs around Yatala
Mount Warren Park	Beenleigh	Eagleby
Windaroo	Yatala	Stapylton
Bannockburn; Wolffdene	Luscombe	Ormeau

Yatala (/ˈjætlə/ YAT-lə) is a suburb in the City of Gold Coast, Queensland, Australia. In the 2021 census, Yatala had a population of 1,405 people.

== Geography ==
The Albert River bounds the suburb to the north and west.

== Etymology ==
The suburb takes its name from a property on the Albert River which was named by a South Australian after Yatala Harbor near Port Augusta, South Australia. The word is presumed to be from the Kaurna Aboriginal word 'yertalla', meaning water running by the side of a river. As a place name it specifically referred to the inundation of the usually-dry plain either side of Dry Creek in South Australia after heavy rain.

== History ==
St Mary's Catholic Church was officially opened by Bishop James Quinn on Sunday 12 December 1875. The church was originally built as a masonic hall. The church building is no longer extant.

St Joseph's School opened in November 1875 and closed in December 1877.

Some of the early residents of the area included Ann Jemima Butler (c.1851 – 16 December 1933) and her husband, George Dovey Butler (17 June 1849 – 8 April 1925). Ann Butler was born in Waunfawr, Wales, and emigrated to Australia in her mid-thirties. Her husband was a well-known grazier who also managed the Bulliwallah cattle station in Charters Towers, and together they had two children: Mary Jane Maria Salmon (2 May 1873 – 28 February 1929) and Martha Ann Birkbeck (3 April 1875 – 22 March 1917). Ann and George Butler occupied a residence close to the current Stanmore Road, where they had lived since at least 1913. Ann is buried with her second daughter, Martha, in a small wooded area at the corner of Paterson Road and Torvill Street. The grave can still be visited, and is in very good condition.

In 1988, Bernie Powers opened Power's Brewery in Yatala. Powers entered into a joint venture with Carlton & United Breweries (CUB) in 1992, and then sold completely to them in 1993. For CUB, it provided a modern, efficient plant on a large site, ideal for their northern brewing operations. By 2010, CUB had expanded the plant to over 20 times its original size, enabling it to produce one quarter of Australia's beer.

Yatala was home to an African safari park, operated by Bullen Circuses, from 1969 to 1988. It was sold due to financial unviability and developed into industrial estates. It was located on what is now Lions Park Drive, Yatala.

Rivermount College opened in 1992.

The Bannockburn Bridge, also known as the Paterson Footbridge, opened to pedestrians and cyclists on 11 September 2001 and spans the Albert River, connecting the suburbs of Yatala and Bannockburn.

Since 2006, development has been rapidly occurring within the suburb, with over 300 businesses now established within its boundaries. This type of urban development is predicted to eventually encompass all the semi-rural land currently separating the Brisbane Metropolitan Area and Gold Coast City. Currently, there is approximately 6 kilometres (3.7 mi) of this land remaining between the two cities.

== Demographics ==
In the 2011 census, Yatala had a population of 1,346 people, 48.4% female and 51.6% male. The median age of the Yatala population was 38 years, 1 year above the national median age of 37. 79.6% of people living in Yatala were born in Australia. The other top responses for country of birth were England 6.3%, New Zealand 4.6%, South Africa 1.2%, the Netherlands 1.0%, and Scotland 0.8%. 94.7% of people spoke only English at home; the next-most common languages were 0.6% Dutch, 0.5% Hindi, 0.4% Polish, 0.4% Italian and 0.3% German.

In the 2016 census, Yatala had a population of 1,312 people, 47.9% female and 52.1% male. The median age of the Yatala population was 42 years, 4 years above the national median age of 38. 77.4% of people living in Yatala were born in Australia. The other top responses for country of birth were England 5.2%, New Zealand 5.2%, South Africa 1.6%, Scotland 1.0% and Belgium 0.5%. 90.3% of people only spoke English at home; the next-most common languages were 0.9% Afrikaans, 0.8% Italian, 0.5% Dutch, 0.4% Japanese and 0.3% Maltese.

In the 2021 census, Yatala had a population of 1,405 people, 50.6% female and 49.4% male. The median age of the Yatala population was 43 years, 5 years above the national median age of 38. 76.7% of people living in Yatala were born in Australia. The other top responses for country of birth were New Zealand 5.1%, England 4.5%, South Africa 1.6%, Scotland 0.8%, and Papua New Guinea 0.5%. 89.7% of people only spoke English at home; the next-most common languages were 0.7% Maori (New Zealand), 0.6% Afrikaans, 0.4% Dutch, 0.4% Hindi, and 0.3% Greek.

== Economy ==
The Yatala Brewery is on a site bounded by Cuthbert Drive (and the Pacific Motorway) to the east, Darlington Drive to the north and Pearson Road to the west (27.75493°S 153.23486°E).

Yatala is the base for Supercar team Matt Stone Racing, and was previously the base for Stone Brothers Racing and later Erebus Motorsport.

Kanga Loaders, a heavy machinery manufacturer, are headquartered at 4 Octal Street.

In mid-2024, construction was finalised on a 10,000 sqm advanced manufacturing facility for Gilmour Space Technologies, which will also serve as the company’s headquarters. The facility is on Pearson Road, adjacent to the Yatala Brewery, and situated within the Stockland Distribution Centre South.

== Education ==
Rivermount College is a private primary and secondary (Preparatory to Year 12) school for boys and girls at Rivermount Drive (27.7539°S 153.2004°E). In 2018, the school had an enrolment of 917 students with 66 teachers (64 full-time equivalent) and 50 non-teaching staff (39 full-time equivalent).

There are no government schools in Yatala. The nearest government primary schools are Norfolk Village State School in neighbouring Ormeau to the south-east and Mount Warren Park State School in neighbouring Mount Warren Park. to the north-west. The nearest government secondary schools are Ormeau Woods State High School in neighbouring Ormeau to the south-east, Beenleigh State High School in Beenleigh to the north-west, and Windaroo Valley State High School in neighbouring Bahrs Scrub to the west.

== Amenities ==
The Gold Coast City Council operates a mobile library which regularly visits the nearby suburb of Ormeau. Residents of the Gold Coast can also use the Logan City libraries, with neighbouring Beenleigh being the closest.

There are a number of parks in the area:

- Beenleigh Special Needs Park (27.7748°S 153.1897°E)
- Brewery Reserve (27.7575°S 153.2396°E)
- Darlington Drive Park (27.7508°S 153.2286°E)
- David Arbon Park (27.7472°S 153.2119°E)
- Enkleman Road Park (27.7634°S 153.1987°E)
- Ferguson Park (27.7409°S 153.2094°E)
- Freeway Reserve Yatala (27.7609°S 153.2431°E)
- Gassman Reserve (27.7357°S 153.2203°E)
- Link Park (27.7498°S 153.2263°E)
- Lower Halfway Creek Parklands (27.7697°S 153.2317°E)
- Luscombe Reserve East (27.7651°S 153.2107°E)
- Luscombe Reserve West (27.7619°S 153.2084°E)
- Pagan Parklands (27.7472°S 153.2181°E)
- Paterson Park (27.7547°S 153.1989°E)
- Sears Road Reserve (27.7516°S 153.2106°E)
- Stanmore Park (27.7540°S 153.2190°E)
- Yatala Laneway Reserve (27.7449°S 153.2309°E)

== Transport ==
Yatala is linked to Beenleigh and Ormeau railway stations by bus routes 728 and 729, operated by Kinetic Gold Coast. There are no buses serving the western side of the suburb. However, bus routes 565 and 566 can be accessed from Windaroo by crossing the Bannockburn footbridge at the end of Paterson Road. There is also a public boat ramp providing access to the Albert River, located beneath the bridge on the eastern bank.

== Attractions ==
Yatala is home to the Yatala Pie Shop which claims to have been "a landmark in the Yatala area" for "more than 130 years" as of 2011. The restaurant is considered a common stop-over for travellers between Brisbane and the Gold Coast.
