= Buccan, Queensland =

Buccan
- Suburb
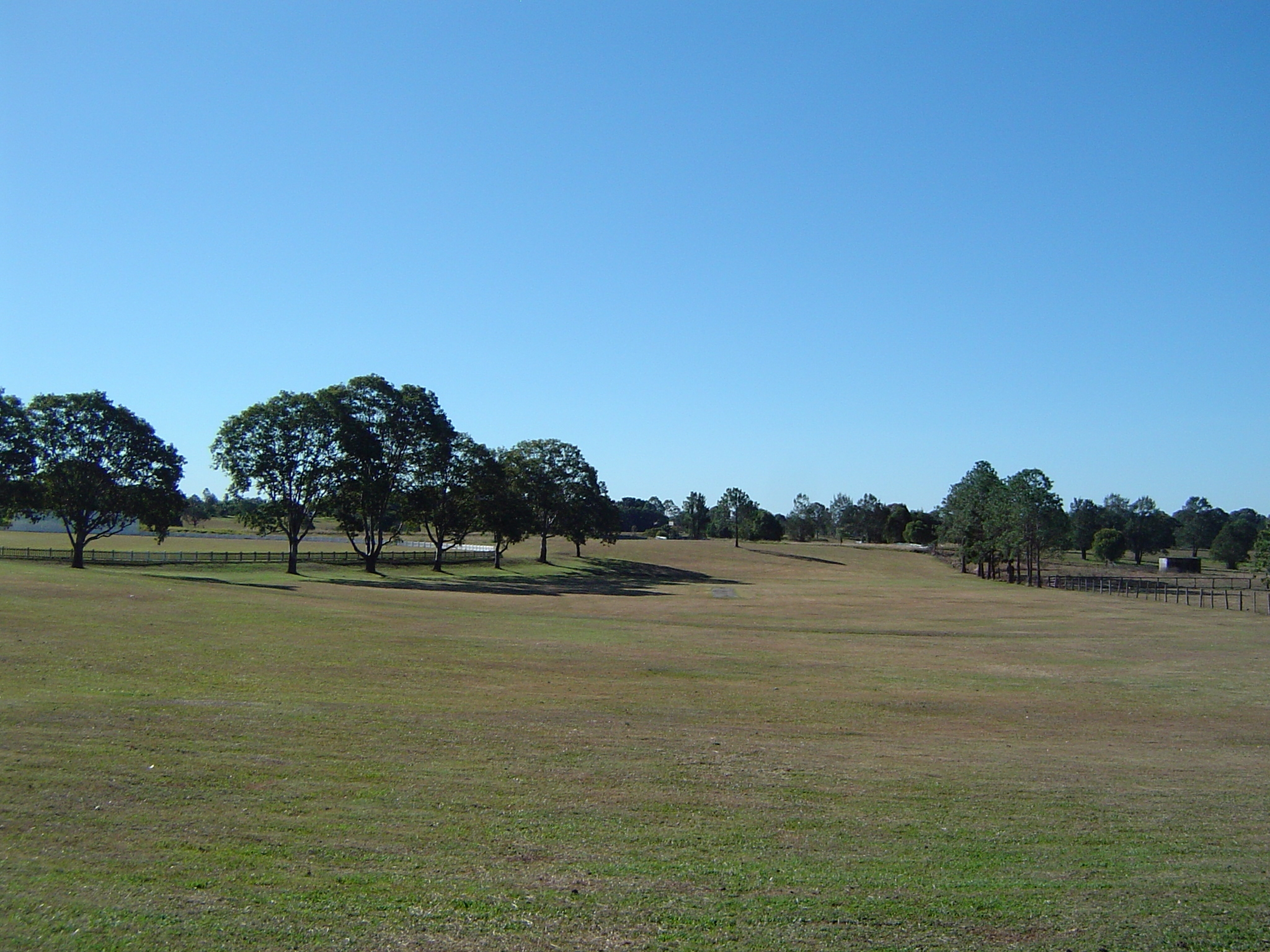
- Newstead Park, 2014

- Interactive map of Buccan
- Coordinates: 27.7422°S 153.1352°E
- Country: Australia
- State: Queensland
- City: Logan City
- LGA: Logan City
- Location: 14.8 km (9.2 mi) SSE of Logan Central; 37.5 km (23.3 mi) SSE of Brisbane CBD

Government
  - State electorate: Logan
  - Federal division: Forde

Area
  - Total: 18.2 km^{2} (7.0 sq mi)

Population
  - Total: 2,134 (2021 census)
  - Density: 117.3/km^{2} (303.7/sq mi)
- Time zone: UTC+10:00 (AEST)
- Postcode: 4207
Suburbs around Buccan
Logan Reserve	Waterford	Holmview
Logan Reserve	Buccan	Bahrs Scrub; Belivah
Chambers Flat	Logan Village	Wolffdene

Buccan is a rural locality in the City of Logan, Queensland, Australia. In the 2021 census, Buccan had a population of 2,134 people.

== Geography ==
Buccan is immediately south of Waterford and east of the Logan River. It is a low density semi-rural suburb with larger acreage bushland type blocks. Buccan does not have a formalised town centre or shopping facilities, with its residents relying on Logan Village, Waterford and Beenleigh to access such services.

Buccan is home to the Buccan Conservation Park, a nature conservation area managed by the Queensland Parks and Wildlife Service.

Waterford-Tamborine Road (State Route 95) runs through from north to south.

== History ==
Early European settlers in Buccan were James Williamson and his brother-in-law Mr. A. Fraser who selected land south of Bethania in about 1863. They attempted to grow cotton but had problems with bollworm. However, sugar cane was successfully grown in the district. One of the largest sugar cane plantations in the area was on the land which is Newstead Park today (beside the Logan River). Dairying was also an important farm industry.

Buccan railway station (27.7517°S 153.1253°E) was on the disused Beaudesert railway line from Bethania to Beaudesert. The line opened on 21 September 1885 and closed in 1996.

Buccan remained rural until acreage plots were put up for sale in the 1970s.

Once part of the Shire of Beaudesert, Buccan became part of Logan City in the local government amalgamations of 2008.

== Demographics ==
In the 2011 census, Buccan had a population of 1,575 people, 48.8% female and 51.2% male. The median age of the Buccan population was 40 years, 3 years above the national median of 37. 75.4% of people were born in Australia. The other top responses for country of birth were New Zealand 5.5%, England 5.2%, Germany 0.4%, the Netherlands 0.4% and South Africa 0.4%. 88.2% of people only spoke English at home; the next most common languages were 0.8% German, 0.4% Italian, 0.4% Mandarin, 0.4% Vietnamese and 0.3% Spanish.

In the 2016 census, Buccan had a population of 1,818 people, 48.8% female and 51.2% male. The median age of the Buccan population was 40 years, 2 years above the national median of 38. 76.7% of people were born in Australia. The other top responses for country of birth were England 4.8%, New Zealand 4.7%, Scotland 0.6%, Cambodia 0.6% and South Africa 0.6%. 90.1% of people only spoke English at home; the next most common languages were 0.8% Mandarin, 0.6% Russian, 0.6% Khmer, 0.4% German and 0.4% Japanese.

In the 2021 census, Buccan had a population of 2,134 people, 50.3% female and 49.7% male. The median age of the Buccan population was 39 years, 1 year above the national median of 38. 78.9% of people were born in Australia. The other top responses for country of birth were New Zealand 4.5%, England 4.4%, Cambodia 0.7%, South Africa 0.6%, and Scotland 0.4%. 87.6% of people only spoke English at home; the next most common languages were 0.9% Romanian, 0.8% Khmer, 0.5% German, 0.4% Arabic, and Greek 0.4%.

== Education ==
There are no schools in Buccan. The nearest government primary schools are Logan Village State School in neighbouring Logan Village to the south, Waterford State School in neighbouring Waterford to the north, and Windaroo State School in Mount Warren Park to the north-east. The nearest government secondary schools are Windaroo Valley State High School in neighbouring Bahrs Scrub to the east, Loganlea State High School in Loganlea to the north, and Yarrabilba State Secondary College in Yarrabilba to the south.

== Amenities ==
There are a number of parks in the area:

- Buccan Conservation Reserve (27.7528°S 153.1529°E)
- Newstead Park (27.7303°S 153.1167°E)
- Samuel and Agnes Smith Park (27.7411°S 153.1235°E)
