= Belivah, Queensland =

Belivah
- Suburb
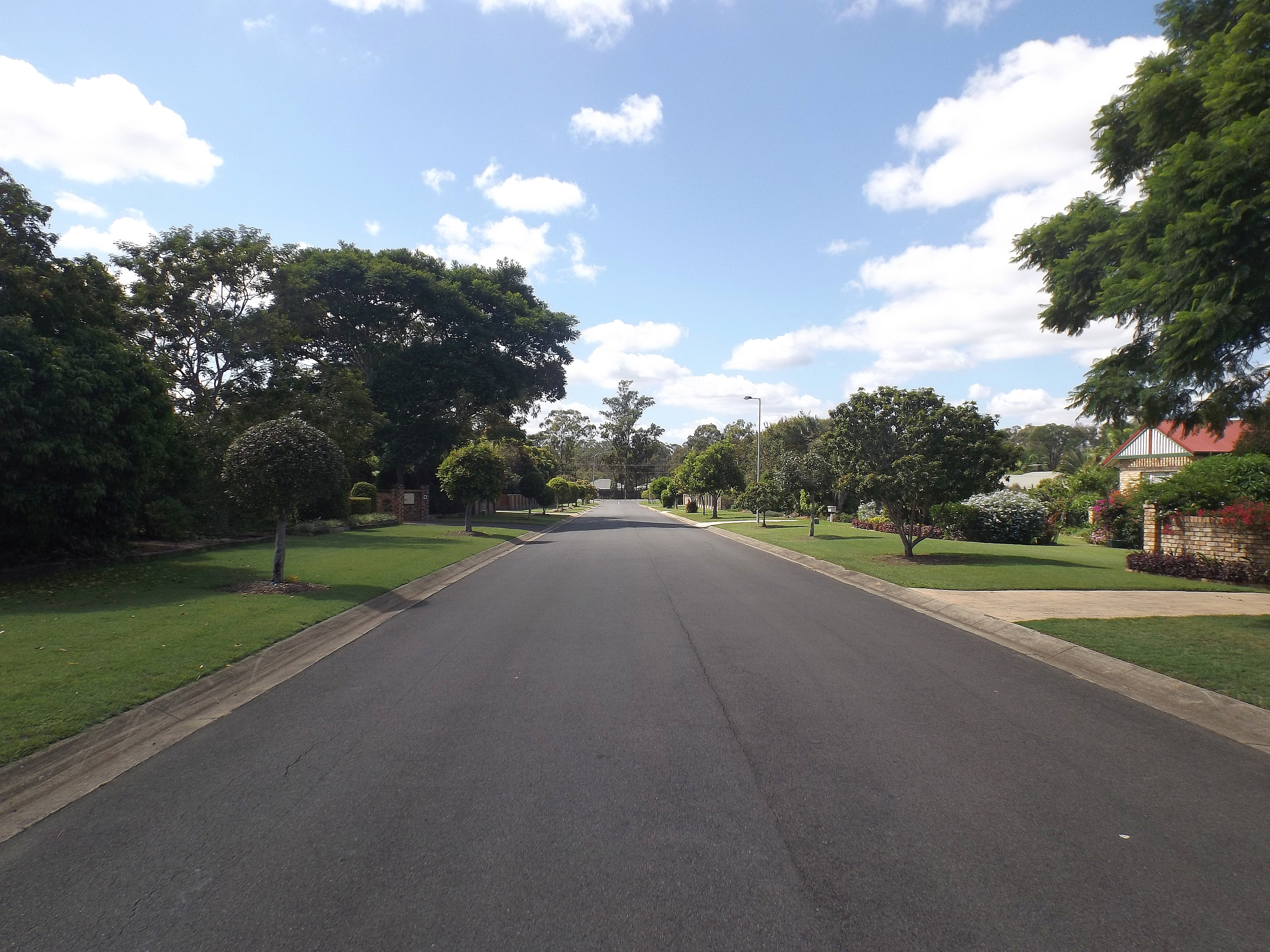
- Stubbin Street, 2016

- Interactive map of Belivah
- Coordinates: 27.7586°S 153.1750°E
- Country: Australia
- State: Queensland
- City: Logan City
- LGA: Logan City
- Location: 5.6 km (3.5 mi) SSW of Beenleigh; 20.0 km (12.4 mi) SSE of Logan Central; 41.0 km (25.5 mi) SSE of Brisbane CBD

Government
  - State electorate: Logan
  - Federal division: Forde

Area
  - Total: 3.3 km^{2} (1.3 sq mi)

Population
  - Total: 515 (2021 census)
  - Density: 156.1/km^{2} (404/sq mi)
- Time zone: UTC+10:00 (AEST)
- Postcode: 4207
Suburbs around Belivah
Bahrs Scrub	Bahrs Scrub	Windaroo
Buccan	Belivah	Bannockburn
Buccan	Wolffdene	Wolffdene

Belivah is a suburb in the City of Logan, Queensland, Australia. In the 2021 census, Belivah had a population of 515 people.

== Geography ==
The Beaudesert–Beenleigh Road runs along most of the eastern boundary.

== History ==
Belivah is an Aboriginal word, indicating big fella fighting ground, however the specific language and dialect were not recorded.

In December 1872, a Congregational Church opened on Mr McLean's land. It was 16 by 24 feet (4.9 m × 7.3 m) and built of hardwood.

Belivah Provisional School opened circa 1874 and classes were held in a church. In September 1891, the residents were agitating to relocate the school to a location closer to where more children lived, but the Queensland Government did not wish to pay for a new provisional school. In March 1892 the residents commenced the construction of a new school themselves and the Queensland Government agreed to contribute £37 to complete the building. It was renamed Wolffdene Provisional School. On 1 January 1909, it became Wolffdene State School. It closed in 1935 but re-opened on 15 February 1939. It closed permanently on 31 August 1942.

Belivah was named by the Governor in Council on 11 May 1985. The first stages of the suburb’s residential development began in 1991, the Boundaries were amended, and the area was changed to Suburb status on 7 February 2003.

== Demographics ==
In the 2011 census, Belivah had a population of 323 people (48.3% female and 51.7% male). The median age of the Belivah population was 43 years, 6 years above the national median of 37. 67.6% of people living in Belivah were born in Australia. The other top responses for country of birth were England 9.6%, New Zealand 3.7%, Germany 2.5%, Scotland 1.9%, Zimbabwe 1.9%. 86.7% of people spoke only English at home; the next most common languages were 2.8% Mandarin, 1.2% Finnish, 1.2% Persian (excluding Dari), 0.9% Polish, 0.9% Italian.

In the 2016 census, Belivah had a population of 317 people, 48.1% female and 51.9% male. The median age of the Belivah population was 47 years, 9 years above the national median of 38. 73.0% of people living in Belivah were born in Australia. The other top responses for country of birth were England 8.0%, New Zealand 3.9%, Philippines 2.3%, South Africa 1.9% and Finland 1.6%. 91.4% of people spoke only English at home; the next most common languages were 1.7% Finnish, 1.0% Dutch, 1.0% Spanish, 1.0% Persian (excluding Dari) and 1.0% Tagalog.

In the 2021 census, Belivah recorded a population of 515 people, 50.3% female and 49.7% male. The median age of the Belivah population was 36 years, 2 years below the national median of 38. 74.8% of people living in Belivah were born in Australia. The other top responses for country of birth were New Zealand 6.0%, England 5.2%, Germany 1.4%, Finland 1.4%, and South Africa 1.4%. 86.2% of people spoke only English at home; the next most common languages were 1.9% Mandarin, 1.6% Tongan, 1.4% Finnish, 1.0% Persian (excluding Dari), and 0.8% Polish.

== Education ==
There are no schools in Belivah. The nearest government primary school is Windaroo State School in Mount Warren Park to the north-east. The nearest government secondary school is Windaroo Valley State High School in neighbouring Bahrs Scrub to the north.
