= Bannockburn, Queensland =

Bannockburn
- Suburb
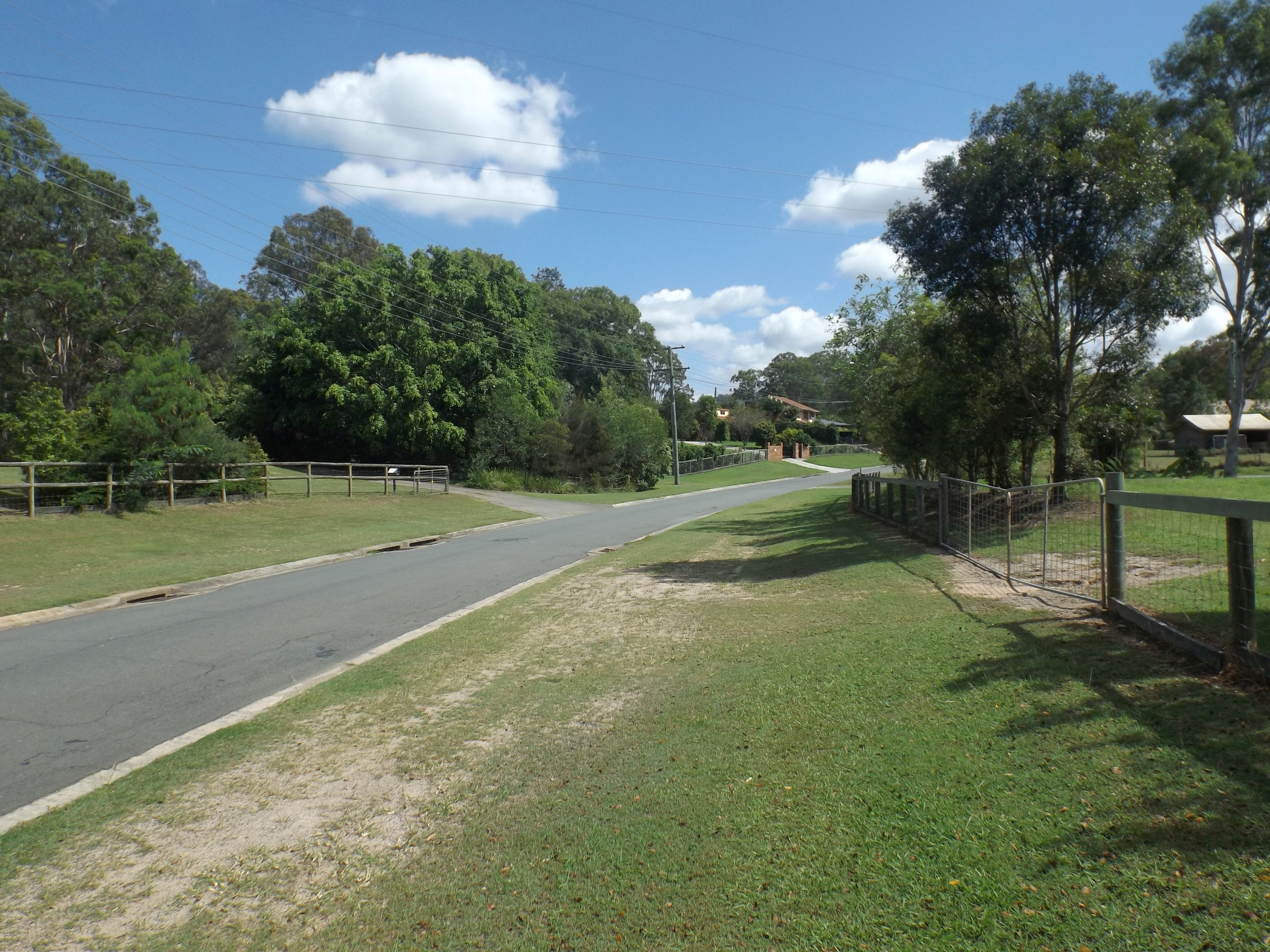
- Richland Drive, 2106

- Interactive map of Bannockburn
- Coordinates: 27.7600°S 153.1922°E
- Country: Australia
- State: Queensland
- City: Logan City
- LGA: Logan City
- Location: 22.8 km (14.2 mi) SSE of Logan Central; 41.6 km (25.8 mi) SSE of Brisbane CBD

Government
  - State electorate: Macalister
  - Federal division: Forde

Area
  - Total: 1.6 km^{2} (0.62 sq mi)

Population
  - Total: 960 (2021 census)
  - Density: 600/km^{2} (1,550/sq mi)
- Time zone: UTC+10:00 (AEST)
- Postcode: 4207
Suburbs around Bannockburn
Bahrs Scrub	Windaroo	Yatala
Belivah	Bannockburn	Yatala
Belivah	Wolffdene	Yatala

Bannockburn is a suburb in the City of Logan, Queensland, Australia. In the 2021 census, Bannockburn had a population of 960 people.

== Geography ==
The Albert River marks the eastern boundary of the suburb, while the Beaudesert–Beenleigh Road runs along the western boundary. Bannockburn Road forms the northern boundary, separating it from the neighbouring suburb of Windaroo.

== History ==
The suburb was named by the Queensland Place Names Board on 1 May 1975. It was named and bounded on 31 March 1979.

== Demographics ==
In the 2011 census, Bannockburn had a population of 460 people, 46.1% female and 53.9% male. The median age of the Bannockburn population was 43 years, 6 years above the national median of 37. 73.9% of people living in Bannockburn were born in Australia. The other top responses for country of birth were England 9.2%, New Zealand 6.8%, India 1.5%, Italy 0.9%, Ireland 0.9%. 92.6% of people spoke only English at home; the next most common languages were 1.5% Gujarati, 0.9% Hungarian, 0.7% Dutch, 0.7% Italian, 0.7% Danish.

In the 2016 census, Bannockburn had a population of 756 people, 50.5% female and 49.5% male. The median age of the Bannockburn population was 32 years, 6 years below the national median of 38. 72.5% of people living in Bannockburn were born in Australia. The other top responses for country of birth were New Zealand 9.1%, England 6.1%, Philippines 1.5%, Zimbabwe 1.2% and South Africa 1.1%. 89.2% of people spoke only English at home; the next most common languages were 1.1% Turkish, 1.1% Tagalog, 0.8% Samoan, 0.7% Hungarian and 0.5% Maori (New Zealand).

In the 2021 census, Bannockburn had a population of 960 people, 50.7% female and 49.3% male. The median age of the Bannockburn population was 32 years, 6 years below the national median of 38. 72.8% of people living in Bannockburn were born in Australia. The other top responses for country of birth were New Zealand 6.9%, England 5.4%, Philippines 1.4%, India 1.1% and South Africa 0.8%. 87.5% of people spoke only English at home; the next most common languages were 0.8% Arabic, 0.5% Gujarati, 0.5% Auslan, 0.4% Dutch and 0.4% Maori (New Zealand).

== Education ==
There are no schools in Bannockburn. The nearest government primary school is Windaroo State School in Mount Warren Park to the north. The nearest government secondary school is Windaroo Valley State High School in neighbouring Bahrs Scrub to the north-west.

== Amenities ==
Carter Park is at 77 Bannockburn Road beside the Albert River (27.7549°S 153.1961°E). Fitness equipment is provided by the Logan City Council.

== Transport ==
Bannockburn is served by bus routes 565 and 566, operated by Translink. These buses depart from Windaroo. Route 565 offers connections to Beenleigh and Loganholme stations, while Route 566 travels as far north as Brisbane City via Beenleigh, Loganholme, Eight Mile Plains, Upper Mount Gravatt, Griffith University (Mt Gravatt and Nathan) and Buranda.
