= Beaudesert–Beenleigh Road =

Road in Queensland, Australia

Beaudesert–Beenleigh Road Queensland

General information
- Type: Rural road
- Length: 35.5 km (22 mi)
- Route number(s): State Route 92 (Tabragalba – Beenleigh)

Major junctions
- South-west end: Beaudesert–Nerang Road (State Route 90), Tabragalba
- Mundoolun Connection Road (State Route 90); Tamborine Mountain Road / Waterford–Tamborine Road (State Route 95)
- North-east end: Beenleigh Connection Road (State Route 94), Beenleigh

Location(s)
- Major settlements: Tamborine, Wolffdene

Beaudesert–Beenleigh Road is a continuous 35.5 kilometres (22.1 mi) road route in the Scenic Rim and Logan City regions of Queensland, Australia. Part of the road is signed as State Route 90 and the rest as State Route 92. Beaudesert–Beenleigh Road (number 203) is a state-controlled road, part district and part regional.

== Route Description ==
The Beaudesert–Beenleigh Road commences at an intersection with the Beaudesert–Nerang Road (State Route 90) in Tabragalba, a locality 7.7 kilometres (4.8 miles) north-east of Beaudesert.

Note that the section of road from Beaudesert to Tabragalba, while officially part of Beaudesert–Nerang Road, is known, with local and state government approval, as Beaudesert–Beenleigh Road

The road runs north-east through Birnam as State Route 90. It follows the north bank of the Albert River, passing through Mundoolun and crossing the river into Tamborine. It passes the exit to Mundoolun Connection Road (Note: Mundoolun Connection Road is a state-controlled regional road (number 209). It is part of State Route 90.) (State Route 90) and becomes State Route 92. It reaches Tamborine village where it crosses State Route 95, Tamborine Mountain Road to the south-east and Waterford-Tamborine Road to the north-west.

The road continues north-east along the river, through Tamborine, Cedar Creek and Luscombe, before crossing to the north of the river in Wolffdene. It next runs between Bannockburn and Belivah, then between Windaroo and Bahrs Scrub. Finally it passes Mount Warren Park and reaches Beenleigh, where it ends at an intersection with Beenleigh Connection Road (Note: Beenleigh Connection Road is a state-controlled district road (number 208). It is part of State Route 94.) (State Route 94).

Land use along the road is primarily rural until it reaches Bannockburn, where it becomes largely residential.

This road is part of a network that enables access to Tamborine Mountain from four lowland points, thus providing alternatives in case of flooding, other natural disasters, or planned maintenance.

== State Route 92 ==
Prior to the closure of the northern end of James Street as part of the Beenleigh Town Square development, State Route 92 continued north-east on James Street and then north on City Road to the Pacific Motorway. It now follows Beenleigh Connection Road north and east to the Pacific Motorway.

== Road condition ==
Beaudesert–Beenleigh Road is fully sealed. It has about 3.5 kilometres (2.2 miles) with an incline greater than 5% and about 360 metres (390 yd) greater than 10%.

== History ==
Nindooinbah pastoral run was established as a sheep station in the area around where Beaudesert now stands about 1842, and the town was settled in 1847. By the early 1880s the town had become the commercial centre for the surrounding district, and had a stagecoach connection to Brisbane. The first school opened in 1882, and 125 town lots were offered for sale in 1885. In 1888 the railway line arrived and the first church was built.

Tabragalba pastoral run was established in 1843 and Mundoolun in 1842. From 1863 to 1872 Mundoolun was a stop on a mail coach run between Casino and Brisbane. Tamborine was settled by the early 1870s, with a school and a church opening in that decade. A timber mill was established in Cedar Creek in 1864, and the locality had farms, a school and a church by the early 1870s. Belivah opened its first church in 1872 and a school in 1874. Mount Warren Park was the site of a sugar cane plantation in 1865.

Sugar cane was grown in Beenleigh in the 1860s, with a sugar mill opening in 1867. The town was surveyed in 1866 and a post office opened in 1867. Schools, churches, and subdivision of land for residences and small farms soon followed. By the 1880s Beenleigh was the commercial centre for the surrounding areas. The railway line arrived in 1885.

The first roads along the Albert River valley were cut to provide access to the pastoral runs and new settlements for wheeled vehicles. With the growth of closer settlement and small farms came the need for better roads and bridges to ensure reliable access to markets.

== Upgrades ==
=== Safety improvements ===
A project to provide safety improvements to sections of Beaudesert-Beenleigh Road and Beaudesert-Nerang Road, at a cost of $24 million, was due for completion in mid-2022.

=== Pavement widening and strengthening ===
A project to widen and strengthen sections of the road and to raise a floodway, at a cost of $10 million, was to start in early 2022.

=== Road duplication ===
A project to duplicate a section of the road, at a cost of $10 million, was to start in early 2022.

== Major intersections ==
All distances are from Google Maps.

LGA	Location	km	mi	Destinations	Notes
Scenic Rim	Tabragalba	0	0.0	Beaudesert–Nerang Road (State Route 90) – south–west – Beaudesert (no shield) Beaudesert–Nerang Road – east – Wonglepong	South–western end of Beaudesert–Beenleigh Road. Road runs north–east as State Route 90.
Scenic Rim	Tamborine	10.0	6.2	Mundoolun Connection Road (State Route 90) – south–east – Wonglepong	Road changes to State Route 92.
Scenic Rim	Tamborine	13.4	8.3	Tamborine Mountain Road (State Route 95) – south–east – Tamborine Mountain; Waterford–Tamborine Road (State Route 95) – north–west – Yarrabilba, Waterford	Road continues north-east.
Logan City	Beenleigh	35.5	22.1	Beenleigh Connection Road (State Route 94) – east – Pacific Motorway north – Beenleigh CBD	North–eastern end of Beaudesert–Beenleigh Road (State Route 92).
1.000 mi = 1.609 km; 1.000 km = 0.621 mi: Route transition

== See also ==
- List of road routes in Queensland
- List of numbered roads in Queensland
