= Logan Village, Queensland =

Logan Village
- Town
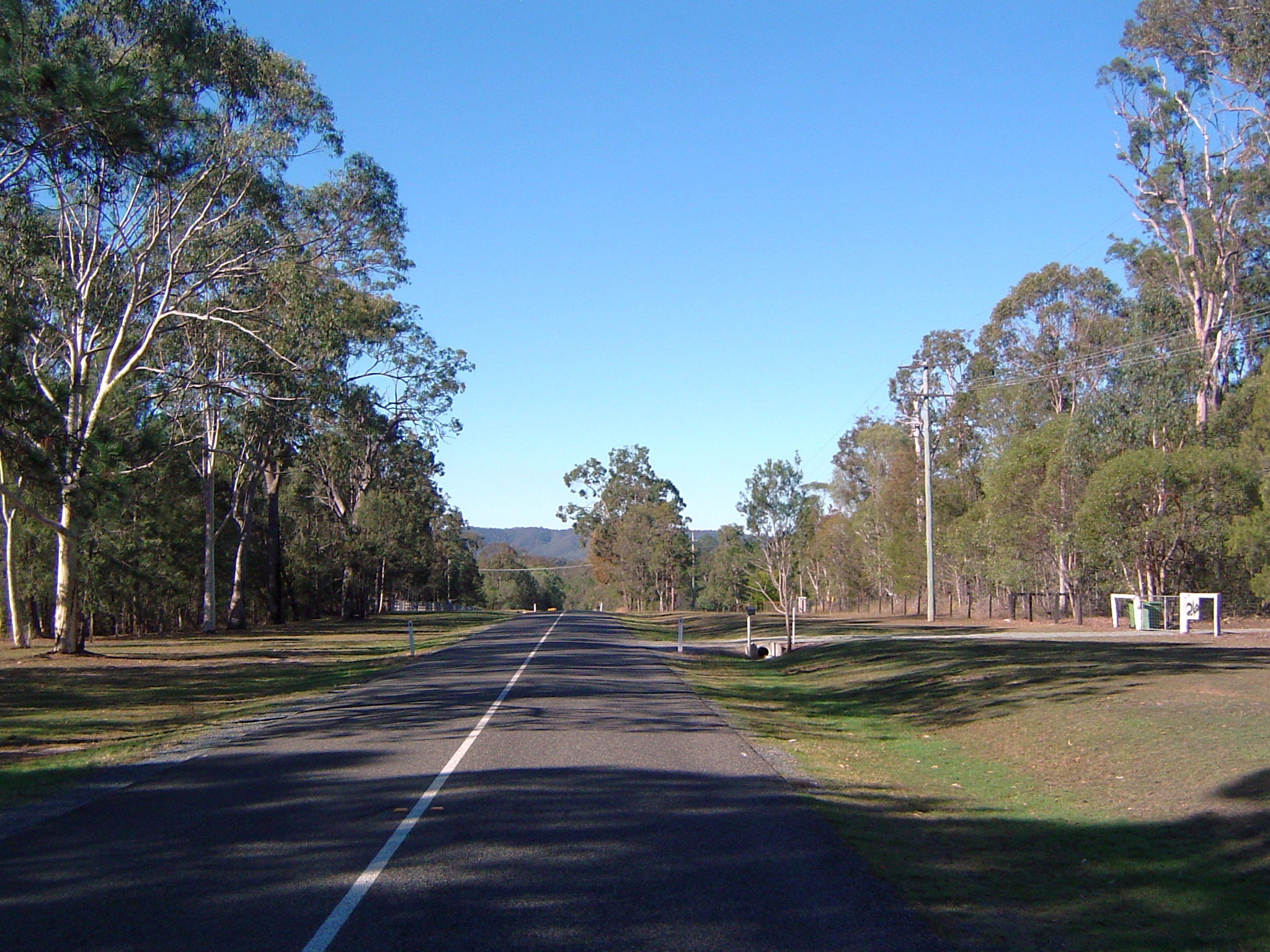
- Hotz Road, 2014

- Interactive map of Logan Village
- Coordinates: 27.7659°S 153.1091°E
- Country: Australia
- State: Queensland
- City: Logan City
- LGA: Logan City
- Location: 20.5 km (12.7 mi) S of Logan Central; 43.5 km (27.0 mi) S of Brisbane CBD

Government
  - State electorate: Logan
  - Federal division: Wright

Area
  - Total: 39.5 km^{2} (15.3 sq mi)

Population
  - Total: 5,316 (2021 census)
  - Density: 134.58/km^{2} (348.6/sq mi)
- Time zone: UTC+10:00 (AEST)
- Postcode: 4207
Localities around Logan Village
Chambers Flat	Buccan	Wolffdene
Stockleigh	Logan Village	Wolffdene
Jimboomba	Tamborine; Yarrabilba	Cedar Creek

Logan Village is a semi-rural town and locality in the City of Logan, Queensland, Australia. Logan Village was once known as the head of the navigable Logan River. Its importance as a town grew again when the railway arrived.

In the 2021 census, the locality of Logan Village had a population of 5,316 people.

== Geography ==
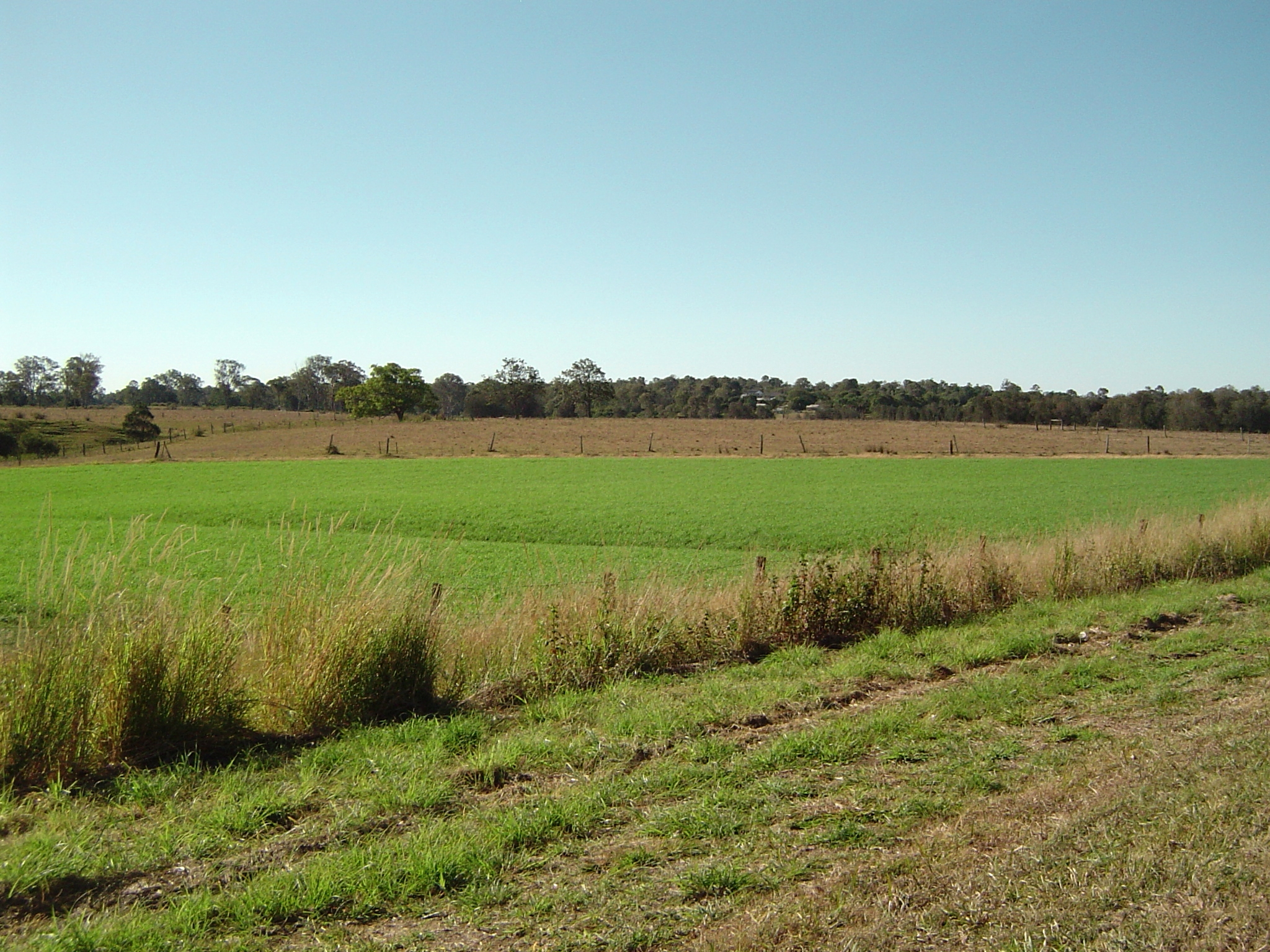
Paddocks along Waterford Tamborine Road, 2014

Logan Village is a low density semi-rural suburb. The area has remained remote with few commercial or retail outlets. The Logan River passes through the middle of the suburb as does the disused Beaudesert railway line from Bethania to Beaudesert and the Waterford–Tamborine Road.

The name derives from the river which was named by Ralph Darling, the Governor of New South Wales, after Captain Patrick Logan. The township was referred to by various names in the colonial era, including Village of Logan, Town of Logan, and Logan Town.

Waterford-Tamborine Road (State Route 95) runs through from north to south.

== History ==
In 1827, Captain Patrick Logan, commandant of the Moreton Bay penal colony, made an expedition to Mount Barney. The expedition is believed to have camped beside the Logan River near present-day Logan Village; Logan notes in his journal, "June 19th.—…at two o’clock arrived at the Logan, not fordable; stopped for the night;".

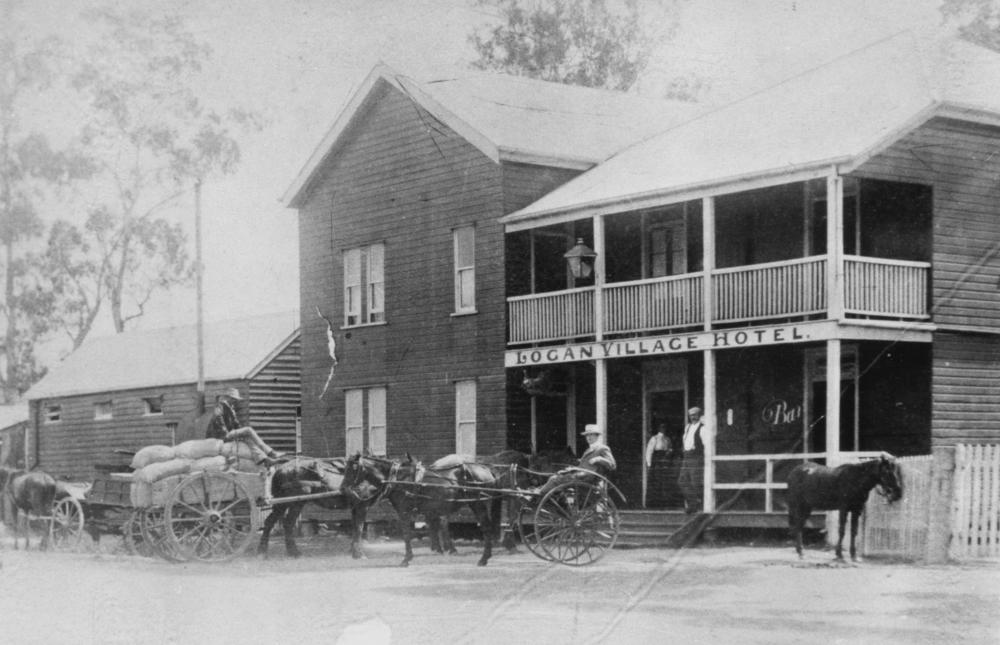
Logan Village Hotel, 1912

On the first accurate map of the region compiled by the surveyor Robert Dixon and published in 1842, the Logan River is shown with a navigation limit marked near the locality of Logan Village. The label "Boats to here" is placed at 4 miles (6.4 km) up river from the site now occupied by the township.

The area was initially subject to settlement restrictions. Until 1842 a 50-mile (80 km) exclusion radius for the penal colony prohibited free settlers. Apart from escaped convicts it was timber, especially cedar, that brought the first European activity to the Albert and Logan catchments. After 1842, with closure of the penal colony, land north of Beaudesert towards Brisbane was opened for leasehold only, to facilitate planning and cropping; unlike further south in the Upper Logan where squatters occupied large runs or stations.

European settlement at Logan Village itself originated in its location as the head of navigation on the Logan River, and with the Logan Agricultural Reserve being proclaimed in 1862 for freehold selection. The first constructions were a wharf and store for the cotton plantation at ‘Townsvale’ (Veresdale) owned by Robert Towns.

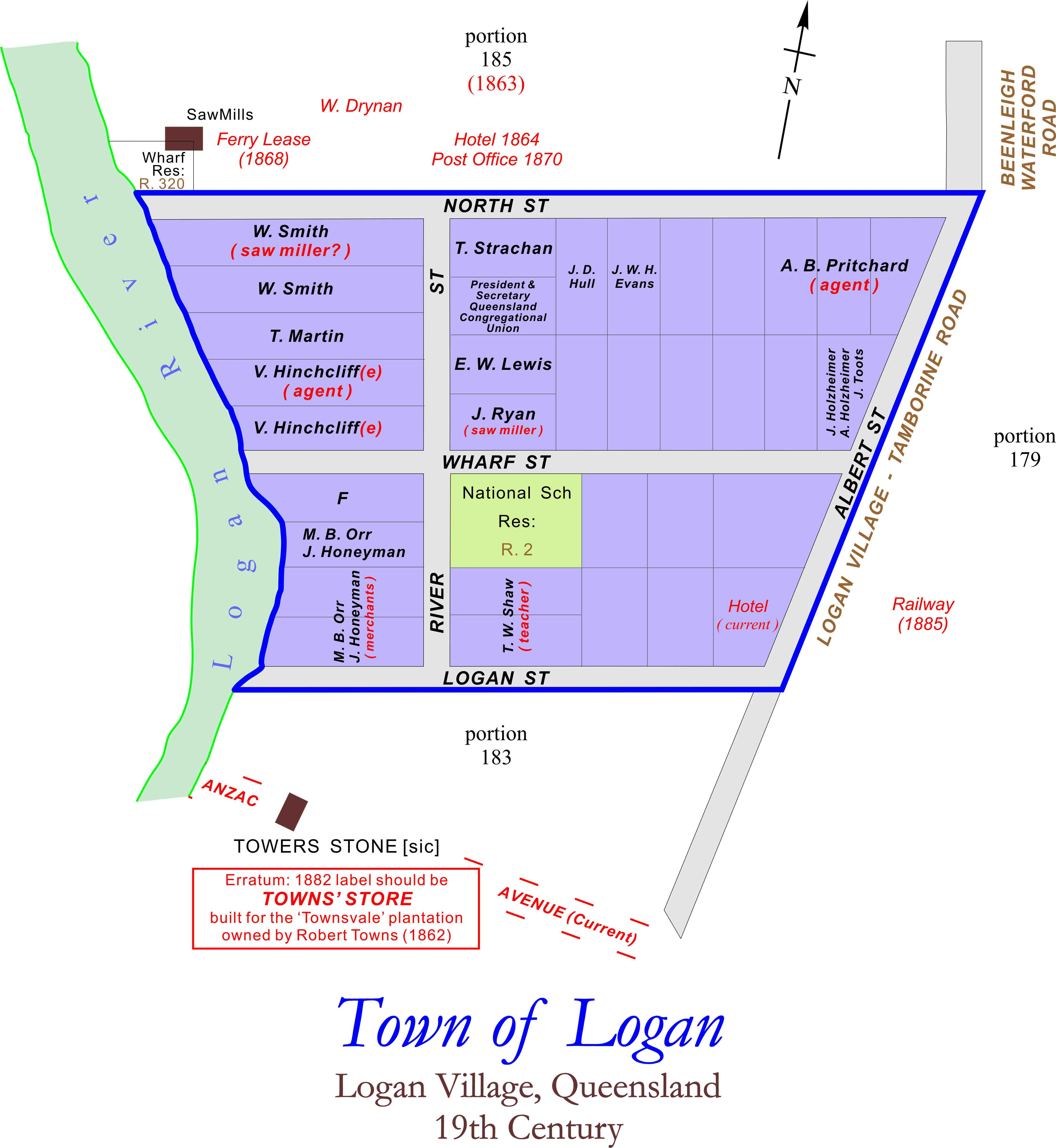
Town of Logan, Logan Village, 19th century

The locality became part of the Agricultural Reserve when it was extended the following year in 1863 by a further 25,000 acres (10,000 ha). The 1863 plan of extension for the Reserve shows the proposed township as portion no. 184, designated RES (reserve), along the east side of the Logan River with an area of 47 acres (19 ha).

The township was surveyed in 1865, with town lots of around 1 acre (0.40 ha).

The first recorded burial in the Logan Village cemetery occurred on 30 October 1878. However, it was not until 1 February 1879 that the reserve for the cemetery was gazetted and the trustees were appointed on 14 March 1879. On 2 September 1976, the Beaudesert Shire Council took over control of the cemetery. A lawn graves section was established on 15 April 1981.

In January 1871, a meeting was held which concluded with the decision to build a Congregational church. Logan Village Congregational Church was officially opened in the village on 24 December 1871 by Reverend Edward Griffiths. It was at 33-35 River Street (27.7660°S 153.1055°E). There is no longer a church at that site.

The Village of Logan Provisional School opened on 1 February 1872, later being renamed Logan Village Provisional School. In February 1901, it become Logan Village State School. The school relocated in 1981 to its current location with the original school being heritage-listed and turned into community facilities.

The Beaudesert railway line opened from Bethania to Logan Village on 21 September 1885. Its extension to Beaudesert was completed on 16 May 1888. The town was served by Logan Village railway station (27.7686°S 153.1081°E).

The first bridge built at Logan Village over the Logan River opened in 1897. Swept away by flood in 1903, it was 93 years before it was replaced with a new bridge in 1996 which was named after the Beaudesert Shire Engineer, Geoff Philp.

A railway from Logan Village to Canungra was first proposed in 1900 with a survey commissioned in 1908. In 1911 the Queensland Government decided to construct the Canungra railway line from Logan Village railway station on the Beaudesert railway line to Canungra. Construction began in 1913 and the line opened to Canungra on 2 July 1915. The line closed after 30 June 1955.

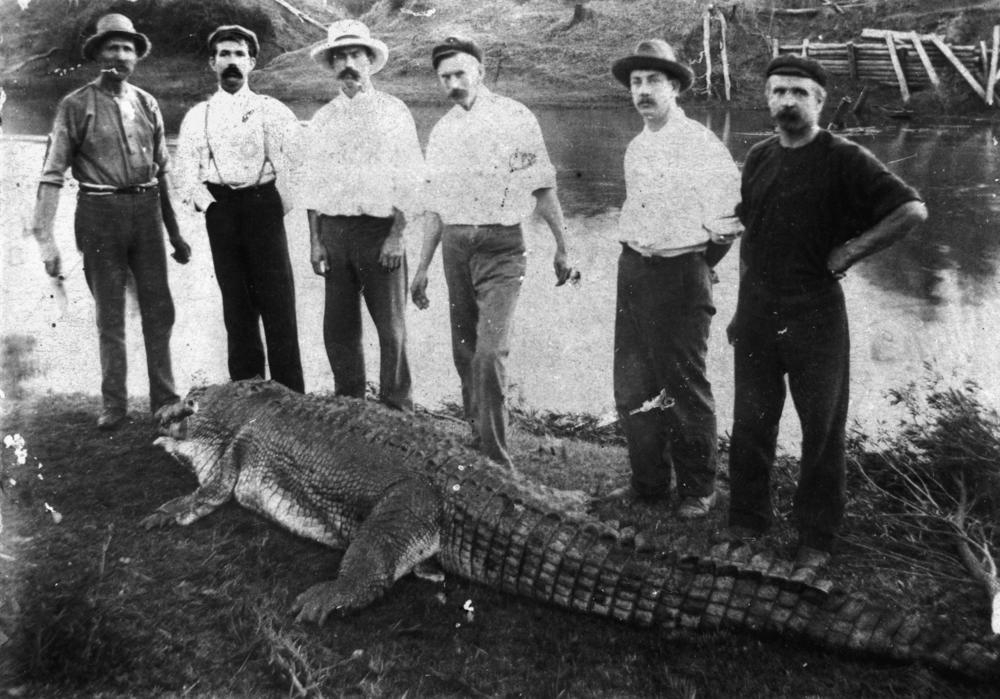
Crocodile shot in the Logan River near Logan Village, 1905

In June 1905, a dead crocodile was found in the Logan River near the Logan Village ferry. There had been occasional sightings of a crocodile in the river, but these had been disbelieved as crocodiles had never been seen south of the Mary River. However, it was seen and shot at by Charlie Gottch at his property (now at Waterford West), but it disappeared, being found dead a few days later at Logan Village. It was 12 feet 7 inches (3.84 m) long. It was suspected to be the crocodile that was brought to Brisbane nine years earlier from North Queensland, which had escaped. The crocodile was skinned and the skin was hung on the walls of the Logan Village State School for many years.

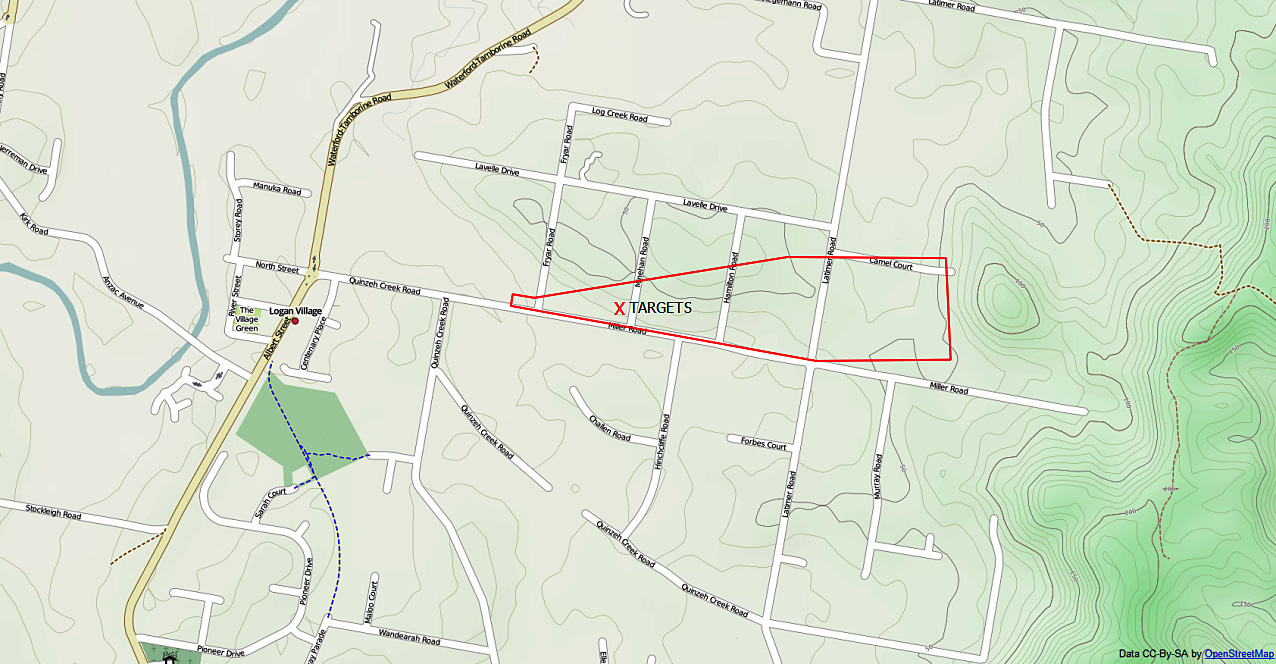
Location of the 1920s rifle range

In the 1920s, Rifle Range no. 98 was located along Miller Road for the Logan Village Rifle Club.

During the Second World War Camp Cable, an army training base, extended from Logan Village in the north to the Albert River in the south-east. Memorials relating to the camp were relocated from its former entrance to the grounds of the Logan Village RSL in 2012.

Formerly in the Shire of Beaudesert, Logan Village became part of Logan City following the local government amalgamations in March 2008.

In 2011, the Logan City Council endorsed the Logan Village Local Plan to develop the town centre and surrounds.

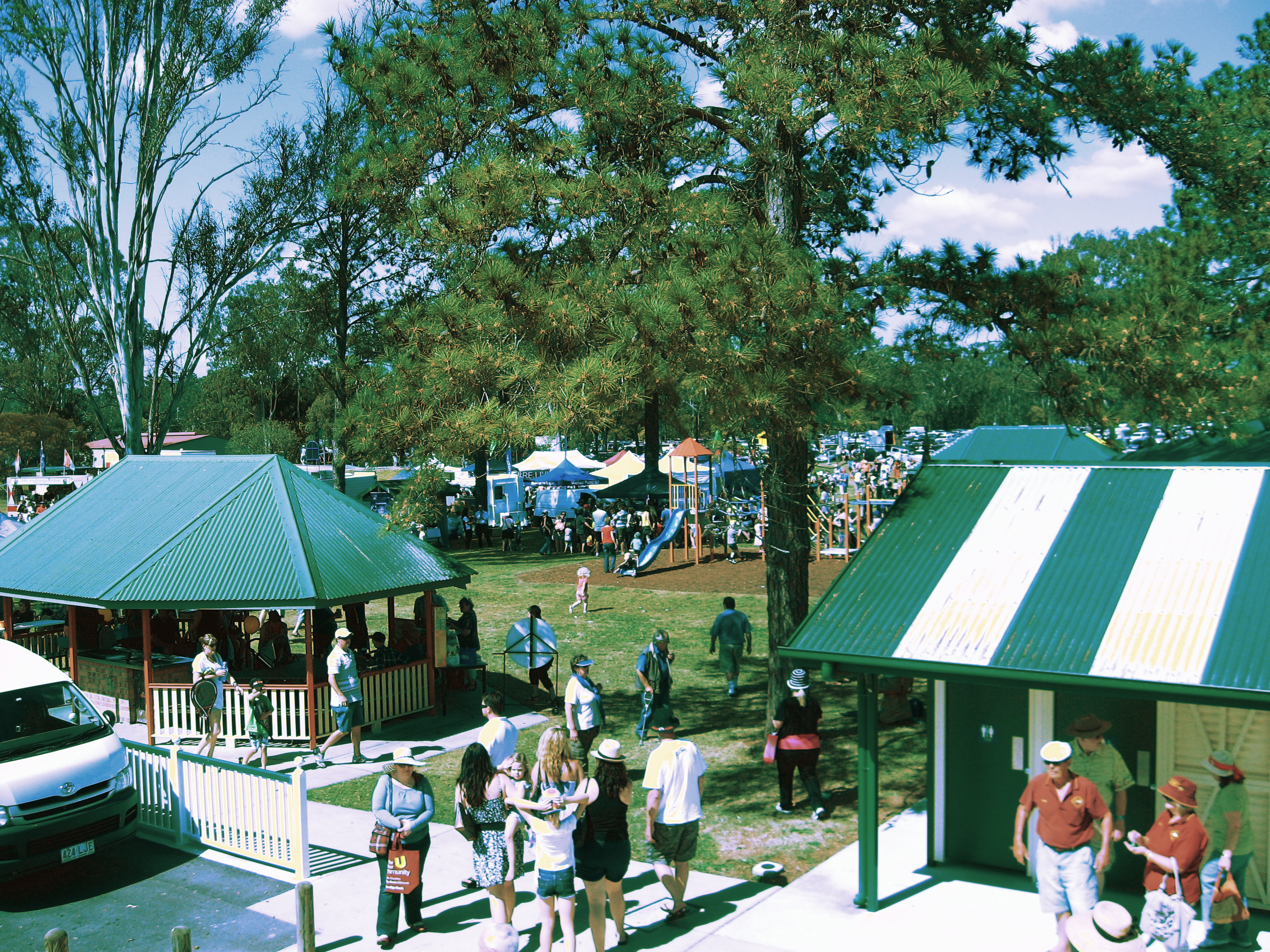
Settlers Day celebrations, 2013

In 2013, Logan Village celebrated Settlers Day, 150 years since freehold titles were first taken up in September 1863. Events included a street parade, re-enactment of Captain Patrick Logan's 1826 landing, and other commemorative activities. The Forest of Memories, described as an "outdoor museum", was erected at Logan Village in 2013 as part of the 150 year celebrations. It is situated on Albert Sreett and consists of a row of plaques leading to 15 three-sided totems displaying historic images and stories from the district. The Forest features special lighting for display at night.

== Demographics ==
In the 2011 census, the locality of Logan Village had a population of 3,586 people, 48.6% female and 51.4% male. The median age of the Logan Village population was 38 years, 1 year above the national median of 37. 75% of people living in Logan Village were born in Australia. The other top responses for country of birth were England 6.2%, New Zealand 5%, Scotland 0.7%, Germany 0.7%, South Africa 0.6%. 91% of people spoke only English at home; the next most common languages were 0.3% Finnish, 0.3% German, 0.3% French, 0.2% Khmer, 0.1% Spanish.

In the 2016 census, the locality of Logan Village had a population of 4,417 people.

In the 2021 census, the locality of Logan Village had a population of 5,316 people.

== Heritage listings ==
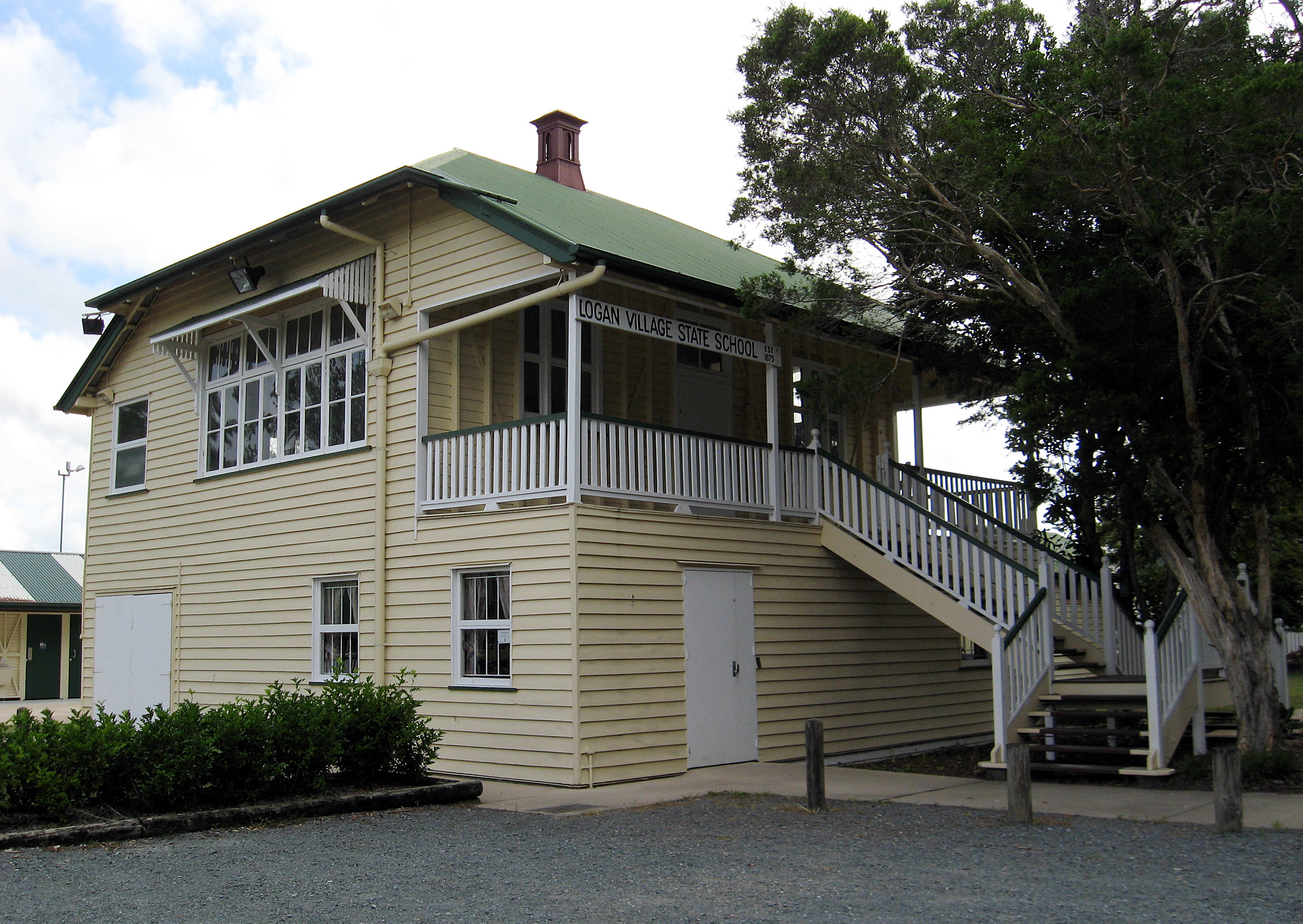
Old Logan Village State School, 2013

Logan Village has a number of heritage-listed sites, including:

- Old Logan Village State School, south-eastern corner of River Street and Wharf Street (27.7678°S 153.1054°E)

== Education ==
Logan Village State School is a government primary (Prep–6) school for boys and girls at North Street (27.7653°S 153.1063°E). In 2018, the school had an enrolment of 691 students with 49 teachers (44 full-time equivalent) and 27 non-teaching staff (18 full-time equivalent). It includes a special education program.

There is no secondary school in Logan Village. The nearest government secondary school is Yarrabilba State Secondary College in neighbouring Yarrabilba to the south; however, being opened in 2018, as at 2021, it is only offering Years 7 to 9 which will extend to Year 12 by 2024. Other nearby government secondary schools (all to Year 12) are Marsden State High School in Waterford West to the north, Windaroo Valley State High School in Bahrs Scrub to the north-east, and Flagstone State Community College in Flagstone to the west.

== Facilities ==
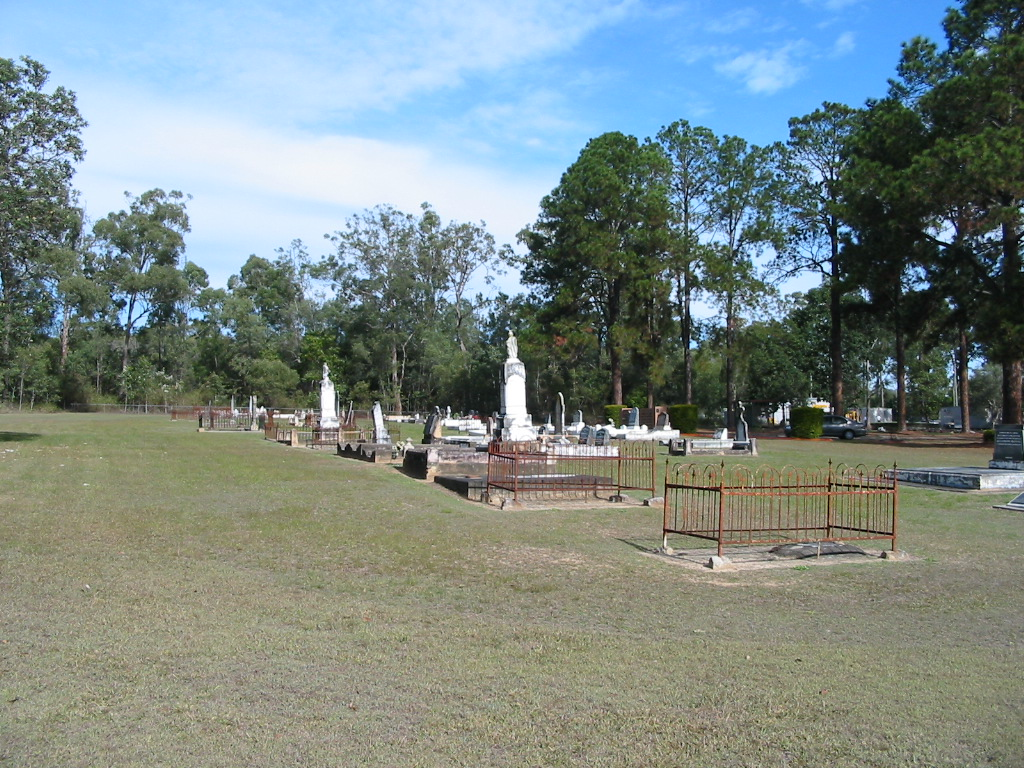
Logan Village Cemetery, 2005

Logan Village Cemetery is on the corner of Waterford–Tamborine Road and Pioneer Drive (27.7851°S 153.1013°E). It is managed by the Logan City Council.

Logan Village Rural Fire Brigade Service is at 1464 Waterford Tamborine Road (27.7863°S 153.1009°E) with Logan Village SES Facility immediately adjacent to the north (27.7858°S 153.1005°E).

== Amenities ==
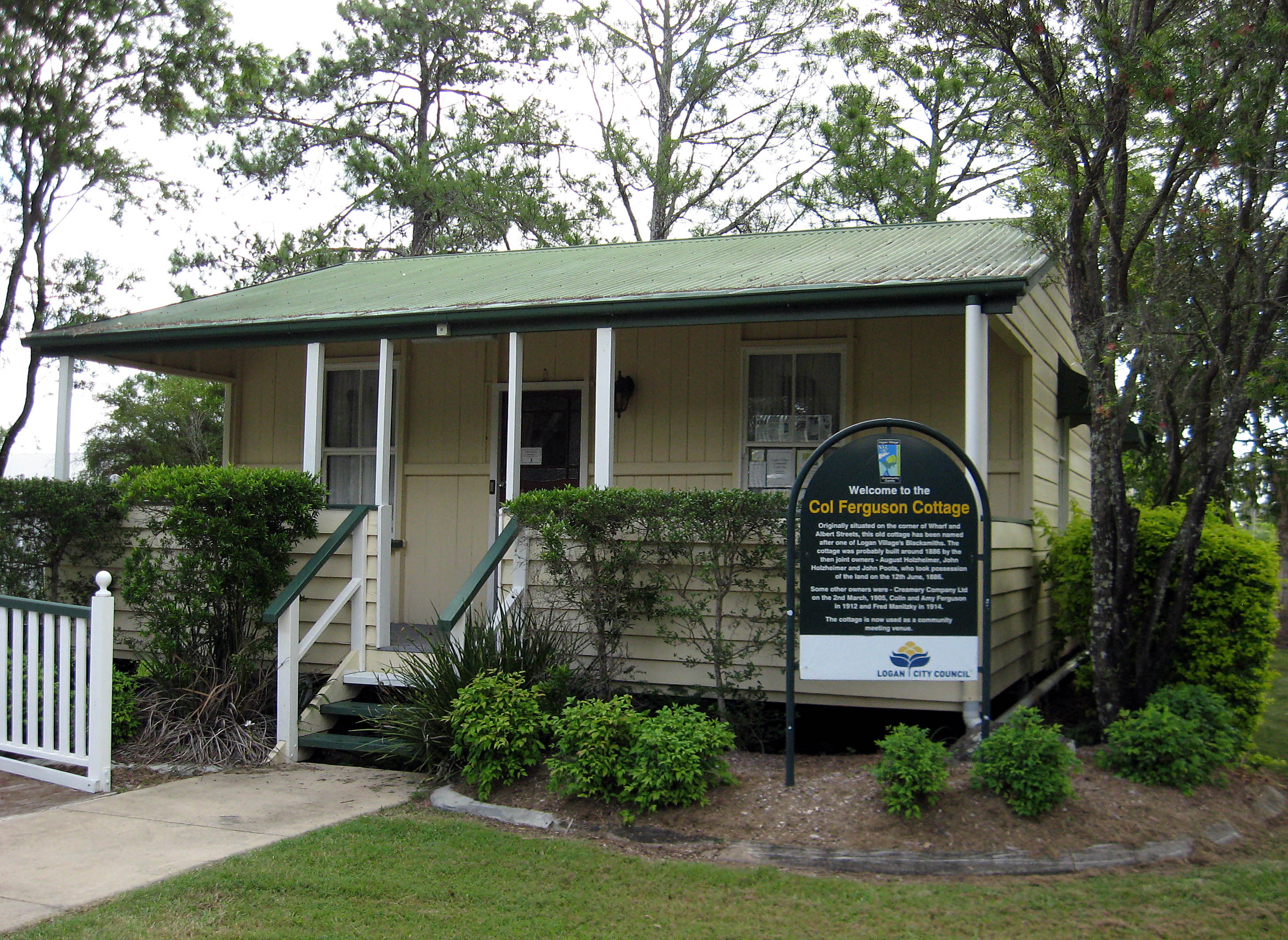
Col Ferguson Cottage, 2013

The Logan Village Community Centre occupies the site of the Old Logan Village State School on the south-eastern corner of Wharf Street and River Street, which contains a number of heritage buildings. Logan City Council operates a public library in the old school master's residence (27.7676°S 153.1051°E). The old school building built in 1902 is available for hire as meeting rooms. Those two buildings are original to the site. In addition to new buildings and structures, five other buildings have been relocated to the site:

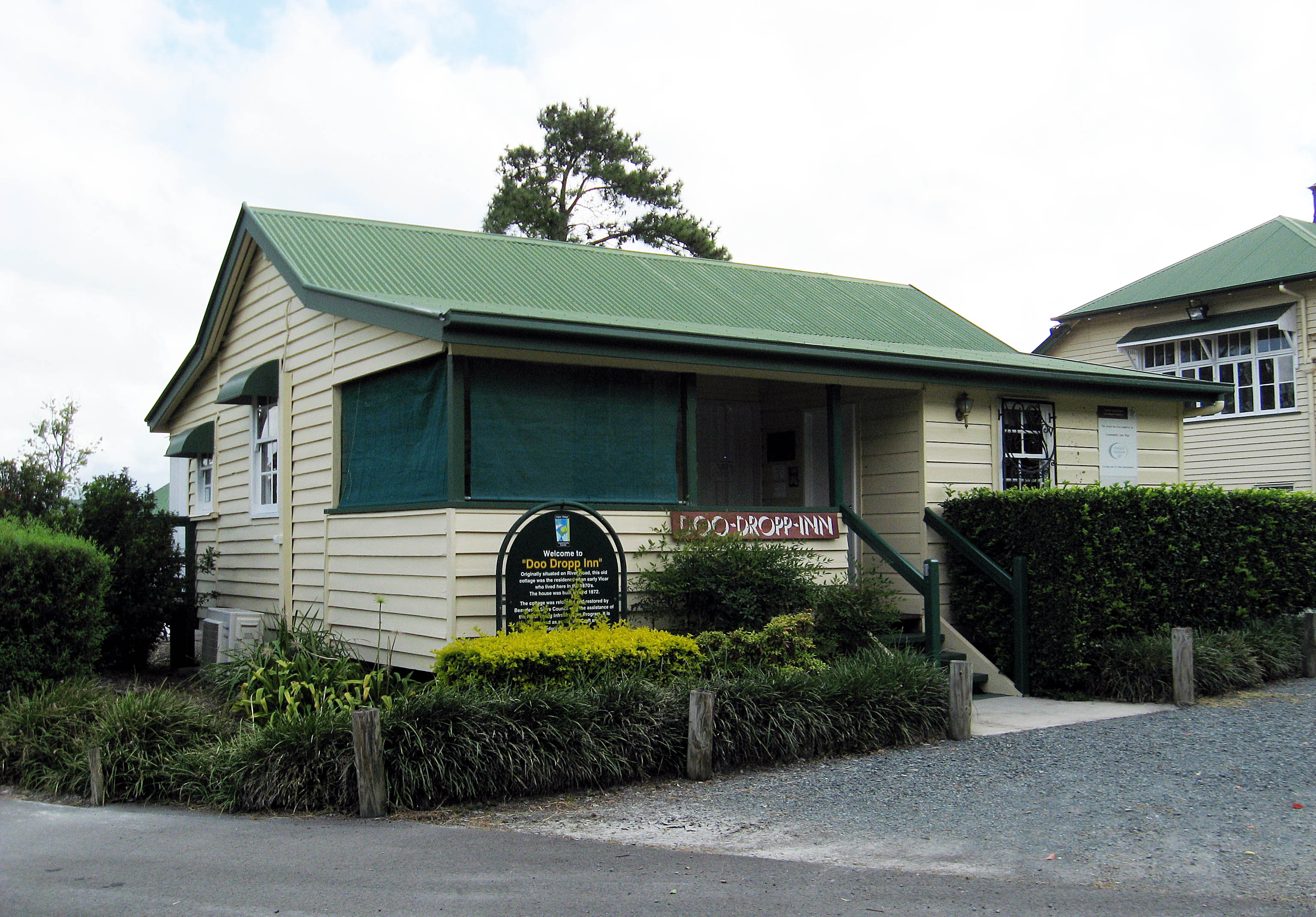
Doo Drop Inn

- Colonel Ferguson Cottage, relocated from River Street, now a meeting venue
- Doo Drop Inn, now the Craft Cottage
- Dance Hall, originally circa 1866 in Quinzeh Creek Road, relocated circa 1887 to the corner of Wharf and Albert Streets, then relocated to its present site in the early 1990s, now a museum building, displaying farm machinery and tools
- Fettlers Cottage, originally near Stegeman Road in Buccan, relocated to the current sitei n the mid-1980s, now a museum building
- Railway hut, originally from the Beaudesert Shire area, then used at the Palen Creek Prison Farm, then used by the Logan Village Riding Club, now a museum building

Adjacent to the centre is the Village Green, a parkland with picnic and playground facilities.

There are a number of other parks in the area:

- Big River Country Park, with facilities for various sports (27.7894°S 153.1193°E)
- Logan Village Park, a bushland area (27.7735°S 153.1097°E)
- Merv And Ollie Musch Park, containing the Logan Village RSL and Logan Village Riding Club (27.7639°S 153.1168°E)
- Quinzeh Creek Park, a bushland area (27.7812°S 153.1256°E)
- Towns Avenue Park, beside the Logan River (27.7713°S 153.1010°E)

Village Links Golf Club is an 18-hole golf course at 55-103 Swanborough Road (27.7855°S 153.1448°E).

== Attractions ==
Logan Village Museum is at 11-17 River Street (27.7679°S 153.1049°E).

Logan Village War Memorial is at 24-32 Wharf Street (27.7675°S 153.1059°E).

== Notable people ==
- Thomas Plunkett, senior, dairy farmer and politician

== See also ==
- Yarrabilba, Queensland
