= Yatala Pie Shop =

Pie shop in Queensland, Australia

Coordinates: 27.7349°S 153.2261°E

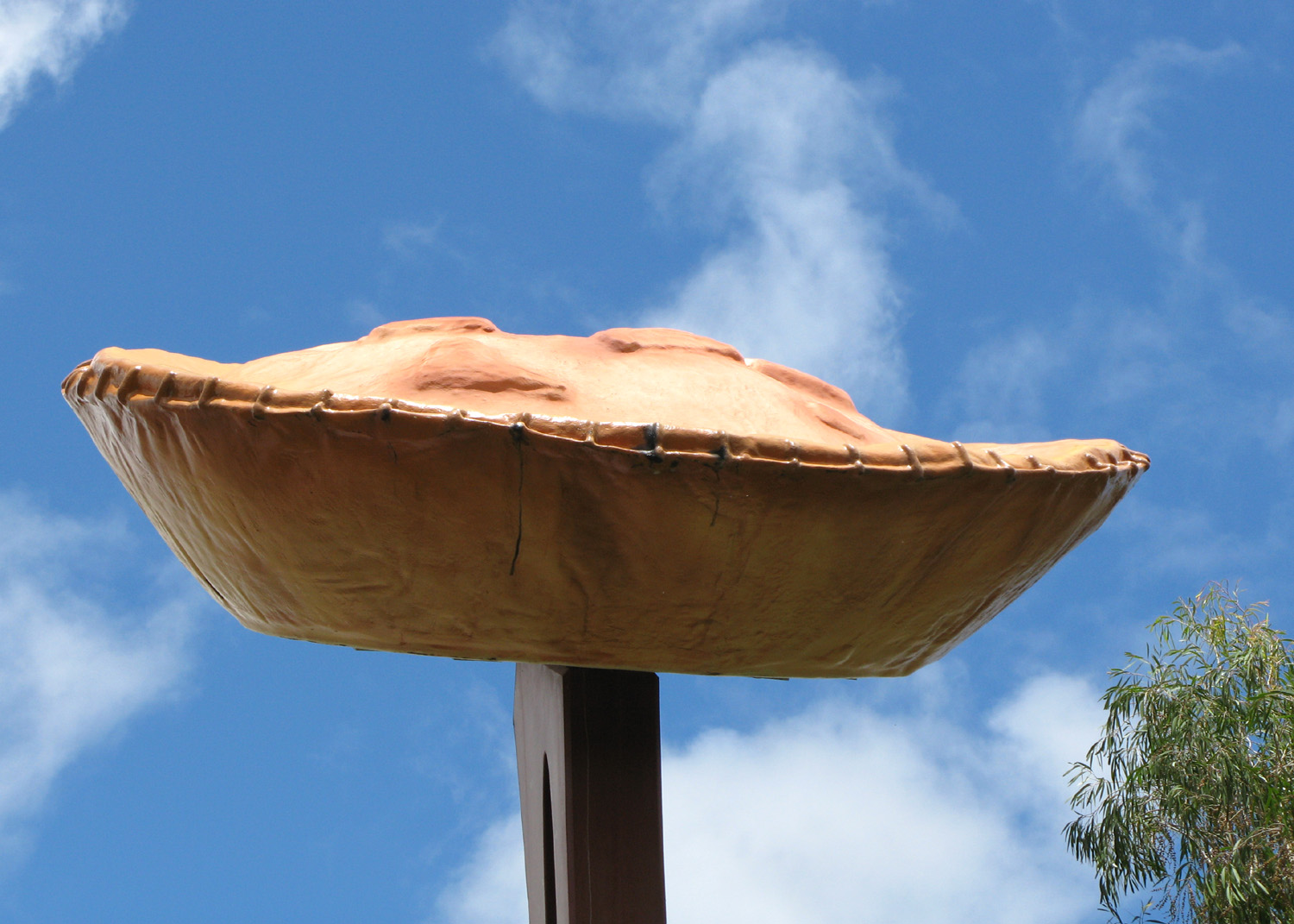
Yatala Big Pie, 2008

Interior of the pie shop, 2012

The Yatala Pie Shop is an iconic pie shop in Yatala, City of Gold Coast, Queensland, Australia. In 2009 as part of the Q150 celebrations, the Yatala Pie Shop was announced as one of the Q150 Icons of Queensland for its role as a "location".

The shop sells 3,500 pies on an average day.

== History ==
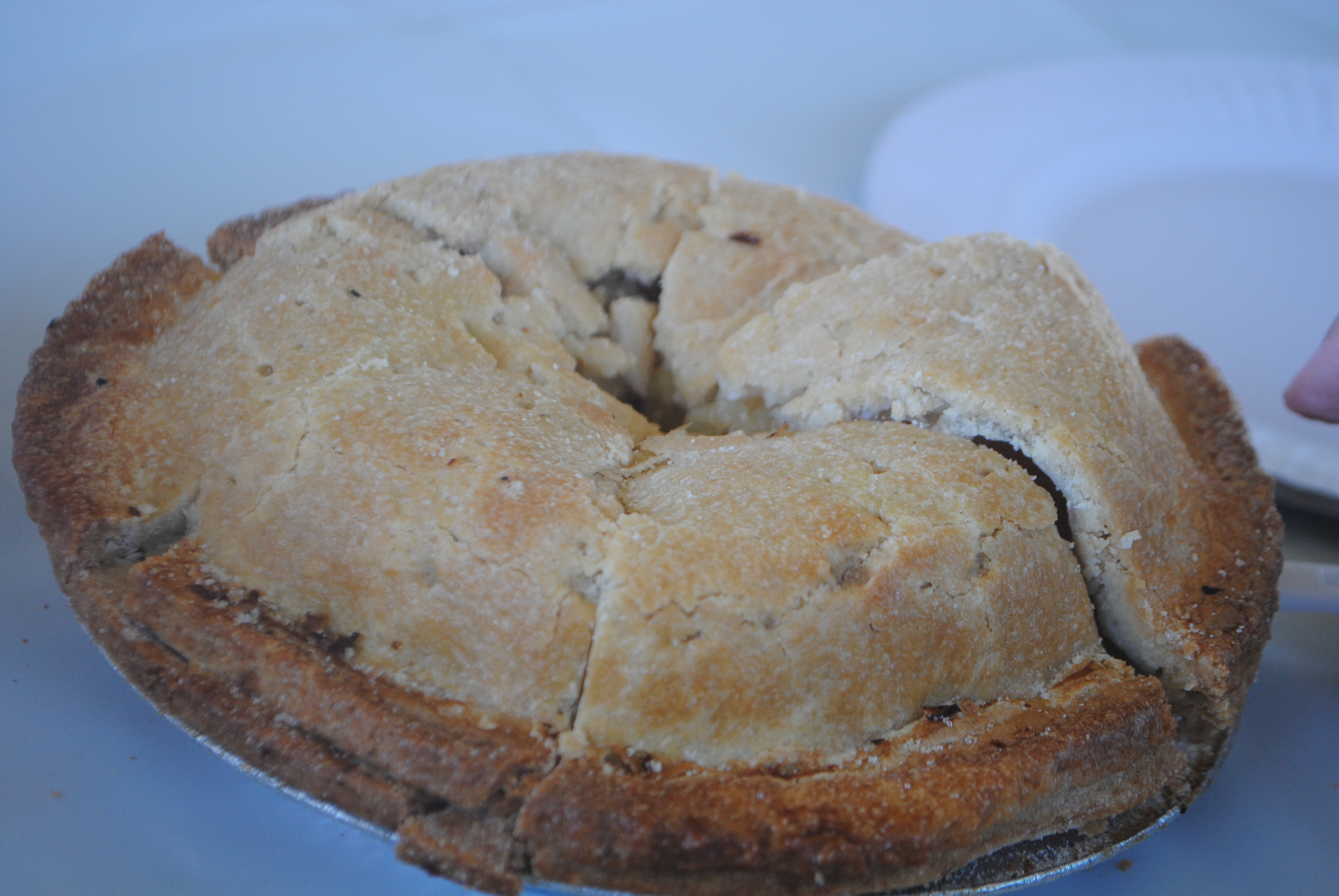
Whole pie cut into slices, 2015

The pie shop opened in 1914. Originally it was located on the Pacific Highway, but when the highway was replaced by the Pacific Motorway which did not permit roadside businesses, it relocated to larger modern premises just off exit 38 of the north-bound side of the motorway.

The pie shop was flooded in April 2017 following heavy rain produced by Cyclone Debbie.

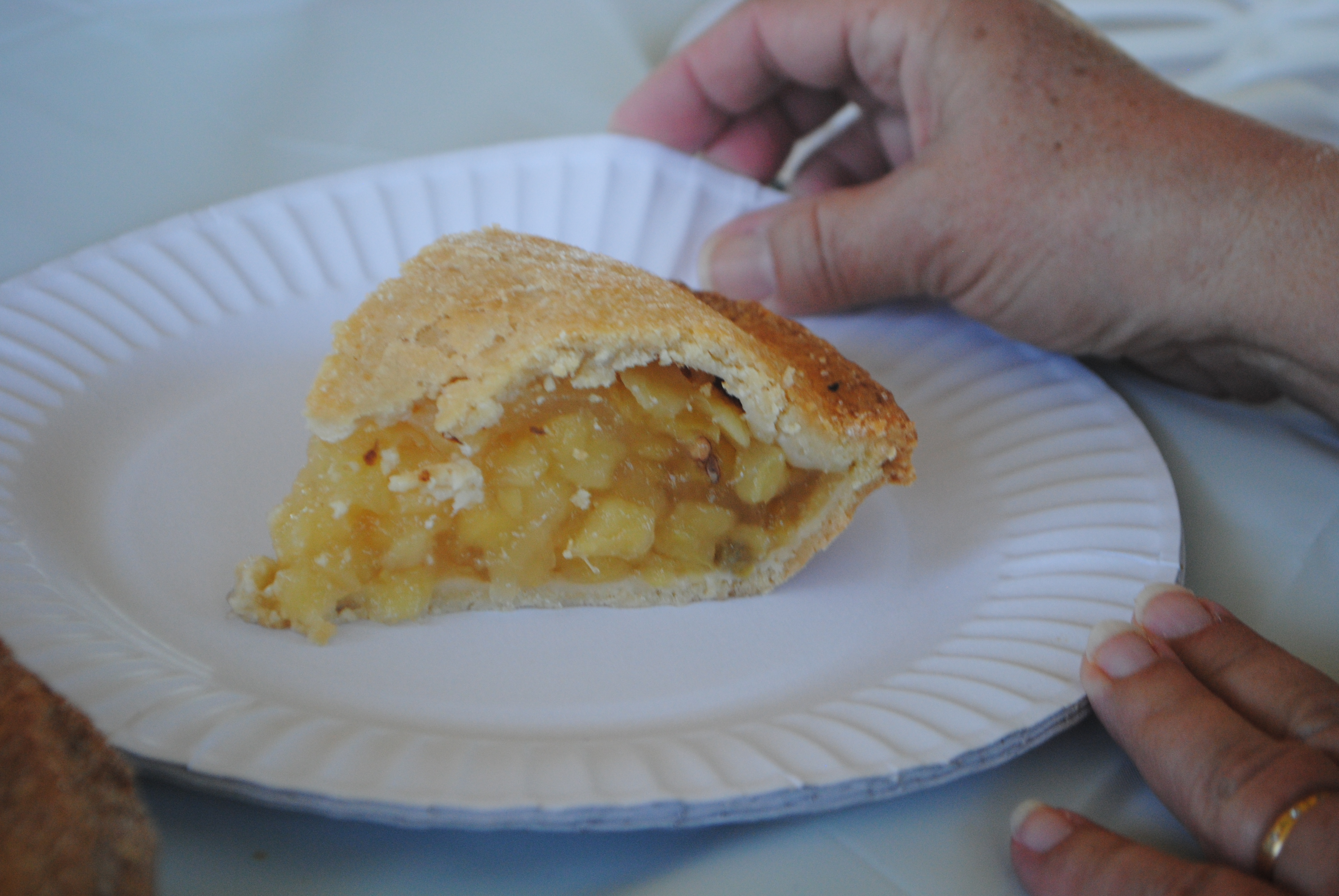
Slice of Yatala pie, 2015

== Recognition ==
Yatala Pie Shop appears on numerous "best of pie shop" lists, won a 2007 Family Business Australia award, and is one of Queensland's top 15 icons.

== Landmark ==
The Big Pie on top of a post outside the shop is listed as one of Australia's Big Things.

== See also ==
- List of bakery cafés
- List of Queensland's Q150 Icons
