= Bahrs Scrub, Queensland =

Bahrs Scrub
- Suburb
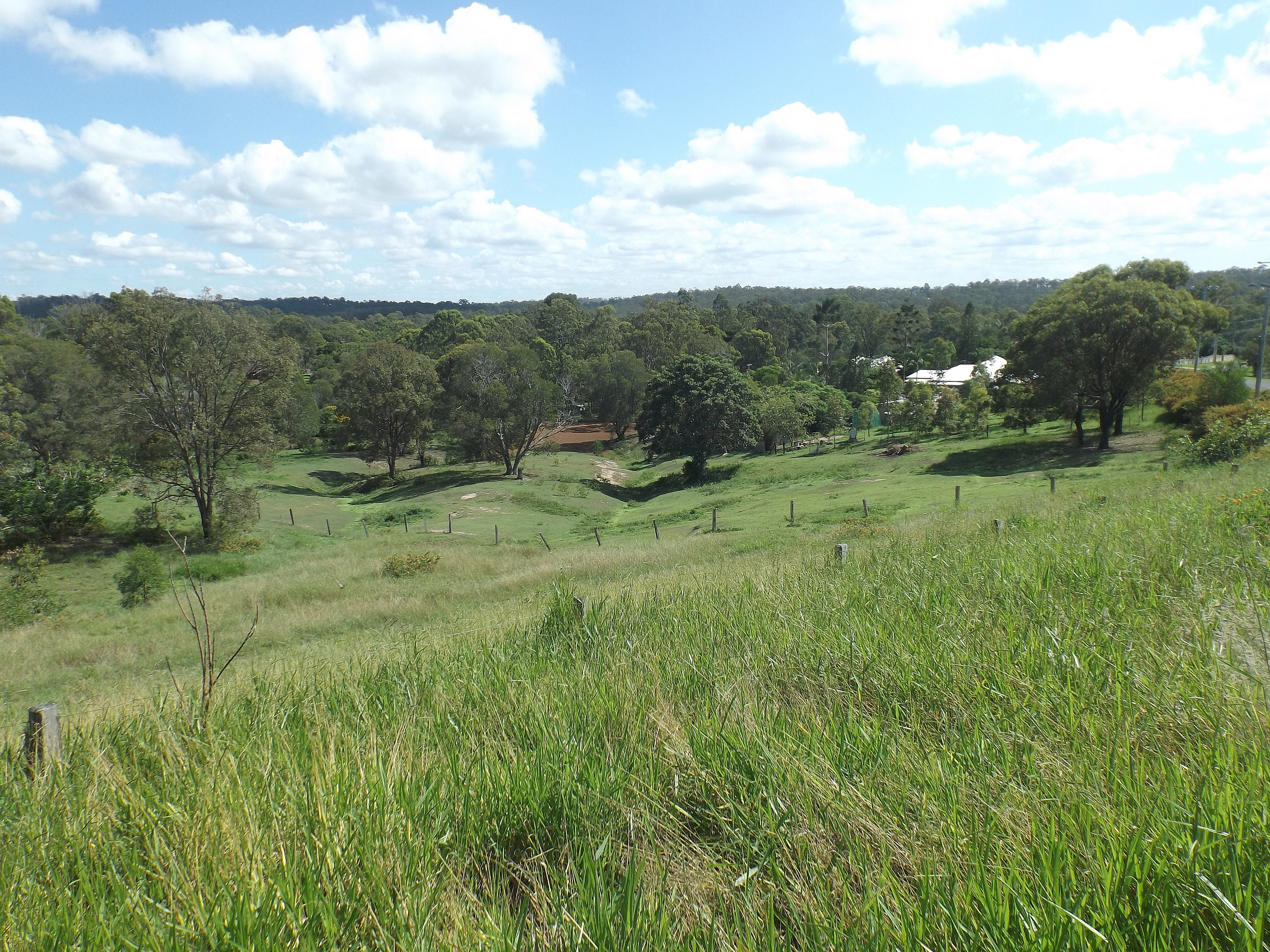
- Majella Crescent, 2016

- Interactive map of Bahrs Scrub
- Coordinates: 27.7377°S 153.1733°E
- Country: Australia
- State: Queensland
- City: Logan City
- LGA: Logan City
- Location: 15.5 km (9.6 mi) SE of Logan Central; 41.4 km (25.7 mi) SSE of Brisbane CBD; 51.1 km (31.8 mi) NNW of Southport

Government
  - State electorate: Macalister
  - Federal division: Forde

Area
  - Total: 9.9 km^{2} (3.8 sq mi)

Population
  - Total: 4,508 (2021 census)
  - Density: 455.4/km^{2} (1,179/sq mi)
- Time zone: UTC+10:00 (AEST)
- Postcode: 4207
Suburbs around Bahrs Scrub
Waterford	Holmview; Beenleigh	Mount Warren Park
Buccan	Bahrs Scrub	Windaroo
Buccan	Belivah	Bannockburn

Bahrs Scrub is an urban locality in the City of Logan, Queensland, Australia. In the 2021 census, Bahrs Scrub had a population of 4,508 people.

== Geography ==
Bahrs Scrub was until recently a sparsely populated suburb, characterised by large hills with heavy vegetation cover, and acreage properties scattered throughout. In the last decade the suburb has experienced strong residential growth following decisions by Logan City Council to rezone parts of the suburb. The area is being planned to contain a total of 10,000 people that effectively manages housing, retail, commercial and community centres, public transport and the environment.

The main development in the suburb is the Brookhaven development being delivered by Frasers Property. There are smaller disconnected subdivisions which are being developed towards the eastern portion of the suburb.

The Beaudesert–Beenleigh Road runs along the eastern boundary.

== History ==
As the name suggests, the area was originally scrub land. The origin of the name is less clear. It has been attributed to early German settlers, Carl Wilhelm Bahr and his son, Wilhelm Bahr. The earliest references to the location call it Jimmybark Scrub and the nearby hill Bark Hill (now Bahrs Hill), so the current names may be a corruption of these.

Bahr's Scrub State School opened circa June 1919. It closed in 1929 due to low student numbers.

Windaroo Valley State High School opened on 1 January 1994.

== Demographics ==
In the 2011 census, Bahrs Scrub recorded a population of 1,512 people, 51.8% female and 48.2% male. The median age of the Bahrs Scrub population was 32 years, 5 years below the national median of 37. 73.9% of people living in Bahrs Scrub were born in Australia. The other top responses for country of birth were New Zealand 6.3%, England 5.1%, South Africa 1.1%, Netherlands 1%, Zimbabwe 0.7%. 88.9% of people spoke only English at home; the next most common languages were 0.7% Russian, 0.6% Afrikaans, 0.5% Dutch, 0.5% Hungarian, 0.5% Mandarin.

In the 2016 census, Bahrs Scrub recorded a population of 1,919 people, 51% female and 49% male. The median age of the Bahrs Scrub population was 31 years, 7 years below the national median of 38. 73.4% of people living in Bahrs Scrub were born in Australia. The other top responses for country of birth were New Zealand 9.5%, England 4.0%, Netherlands 0.9%, South Africa 0.8% and Scotland 0.5%. 89.4% of people only spoke English at home; the next most common languages were 0.5% Mandarin, 0.5% Dutch, 0.4% Sinhalese, 0.4% Spanish and 0.4% Romanian.

In the 2021 census, Bahrs Scrub recorded a population of 4,508 people. 51.6% of the population are female and 48.4% are male. The median age of the Bahrs Scrub population was 29 years, 9 years below the national median of 38. 71.1% of people living in Bahrs Scrub were born in Australia. The other top responses for country of birth were New Zealand 9.0%, England 3.2%, Philippines 1.4%, South Africa 1.4%, India 1.1%. 83.6% of people spoke only English at home; the next most common languages were 0.7% Filipino, 0.7% Punjabi, 0.6% Mandarin, 0.6% Spanish and 0.6% Samoan.

== Education ==
Windaroo Valley State High School is a government secondary (7–12) school for boys and girls at 240 Beaudesert Beenleigh Road (27.7404°S 153.1901°E). In 2023, the school had an enrolment of 1,186 students with 98 teachers (92 full-time equivalent) and 49 non-teaching staff (36 full-time equivalent). It includes a special education program.

There are no primary schools in Windaroo. The nearest government primary schools are Edens Landing State School in Edens Landing to the north, Windaroo State School in neighbouring Mount Warren Park to the north-east, and Logan Village State School in Logan Village to the south-west.
