= Holmview =

- Suburb
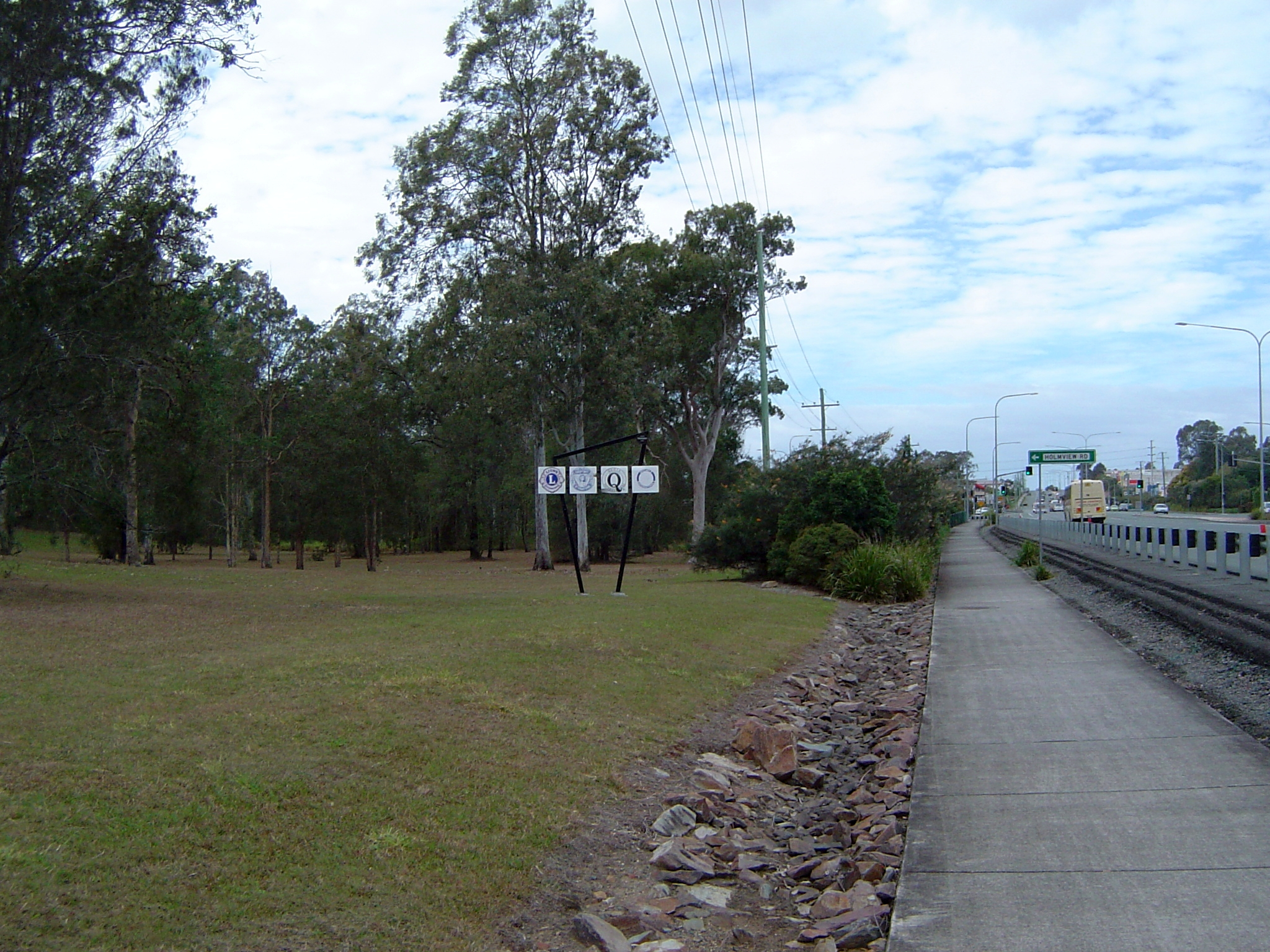
- Lima Park and bikeway, 2014

- Interactive map of Holmview
- Coordinates: 27.7144°S 153.1711°E
- Country: Australia
- State: Queensland
- City: Logan City
- LGA: Logan City
- Location: 14.6 km (9.1 mi) SSE of Logan Central; 40.2 km (25.0 mi) SSE of Brisbane CBD

Government
  - State electorate: Macalister
  - Federal division: Forde

Area
  - Total: 4.0 km^{2} (1.5 sq mi)

Population
  - Total: 4,455 (2021 census)
  - Density: 1,114/km^{2} (2,880/sq mi)
- Time zone: UTC+10:00 (AEST)
- Postcode: 4207
Suburbs around Holmview
Edens Landing	Loganholme	Beenleigh
Waterford	Holmview	Beenleigh
Bahrs Scrub	Bahrs Scrub	Beenleigh

Holmview is a residential suburb in the City of Logan, Queensland, Australia. In the 2021 census, Holmview had a population of 4,455 people.

== Geography ==
The suburb is 2 km north-west of Beenleigh and 32 km south-east of central Brisbane, bounded to the west by Gardiner Road and to the south by Wuraga Road. The Logan River is a small section of the suburb's northern boundary.

Just to the south of the river, Beenleigh railway line enters the suburb from the north-west (Edens Landing) and exits to the north-east (Beenleigh). The Logan River Road passes through the suburb from west (Beenleigh) to east (Waterford).

Consistent with the rapid population growth between 2011 and 2021, the land use in the suburb is predominantly residential in suburban-sized lots, although some areas of rural residential housing, crop growing, and grazing still remain.

== History ==
Holmview takes its name from the railway station, which was established in 1885.

On 1 May 1975, Holmview was designated a locality by Queensland Place Names Board. It was designated as a suburb on 7 February 2003. However, the name has a longer history with Holmview railway station being mentioned in railway timetables in 1886, the railway line to Beenleigh having opened on 27 July 1885. Despite its name, the railway station is now within the locality of Beenleigh. There is an 1889 electoral roll listing for William Mann, a leaseholder at "Holmview, Beenleigh".

The cattle yards in Beenleigh relocated to Holmview in 1980.

Eden Landing's Seventh Day Adventist Church was built from brick in 1990.

== Demographics ==
In the 2011 census, the suburb recorded a population of 1,395 people, 50.2% female and 49.8% male. The median age of the Holmview population was 27 years, 10 years below the national median of 37. 73.2% of people living in Holmview were born in Australia. The other top responses for country of birth were New Zealand 9.2%, England 3.8%, South Africa 0.9%, Scotland 0.4%, Canada 0.4%. 87.8% of people spoke only English at home; the next most common languages were 0.9% Maori (New Zealand), 0.6% French, 0.6% Romanian, 0.4% Afrikaans, 0.4% Other Australian Indigenous Languages. This was the first census for Holmview as a separate census locality.

In the 2016 census, Holmview had a population of 2,358 people, 52.5% female and 47.5% male. The median age of the Holmview population was 28, 10 years below the national median of 38. 68.8% of people living in Holmview were born in Australia. The other top responses for country of birth were New Zealand 10.3%, England 2.5%, Philippines 1.7%, India 1.3%, and Vietnam 0.9%. 81.1% of people spoke only English at home; the next most common languages were 1.2% Filipino, 1.1% Samoan, 1.0% Punjabi, 0.8% Vietnamese, and 0.7% Japanese.

In the 2021 census, Holmview had a population of 4,455 people, 51.1% female and 48.9% male. The median age of the Holmview population was 28, 10 years below the national median of 38. 63.4% of people living in Holmview were born in Australia. The other top responses for country of birth were New Zealand 9.0%, India 5.2%, Philippines 2.5%, England 2.0%, and Afghanistan 1.4%. 70.9% of people spoke only English at home; the next most common languages were 4.9% Punjabi, 1.3% Hazaraghi, 1.2% Filipino, 1.1% Samoan, and 1.0% Gujarati.

== Education ==
There are no schools in Holmview. The nearest government primary school is Edens Landing State School in neighbouring Edens Landing. The nearest government secondary schools are Windaroo Valley State High School in neighbouring Bahrs Scrub, Loganlea State High School in Loganlea and Beenleigh State High School in Beenleigh.

== Amenities ==
Lima Park in Holmview Road (27.7105°S 153.1773°E) has playground equipment and picnic areas.

Kingdom Hope Church is at 26 Freedom Rise (27.712361°S 153.168°E). It is affiliated with the International Network of Churches.

Despite its name, Eden Landing's Seventh Day Adventist Church is 3 Castile Crescent in Holmview (27.711156°S 153.174°E).
