= Beenleigh, Queensland =

Beenleigh
- Town
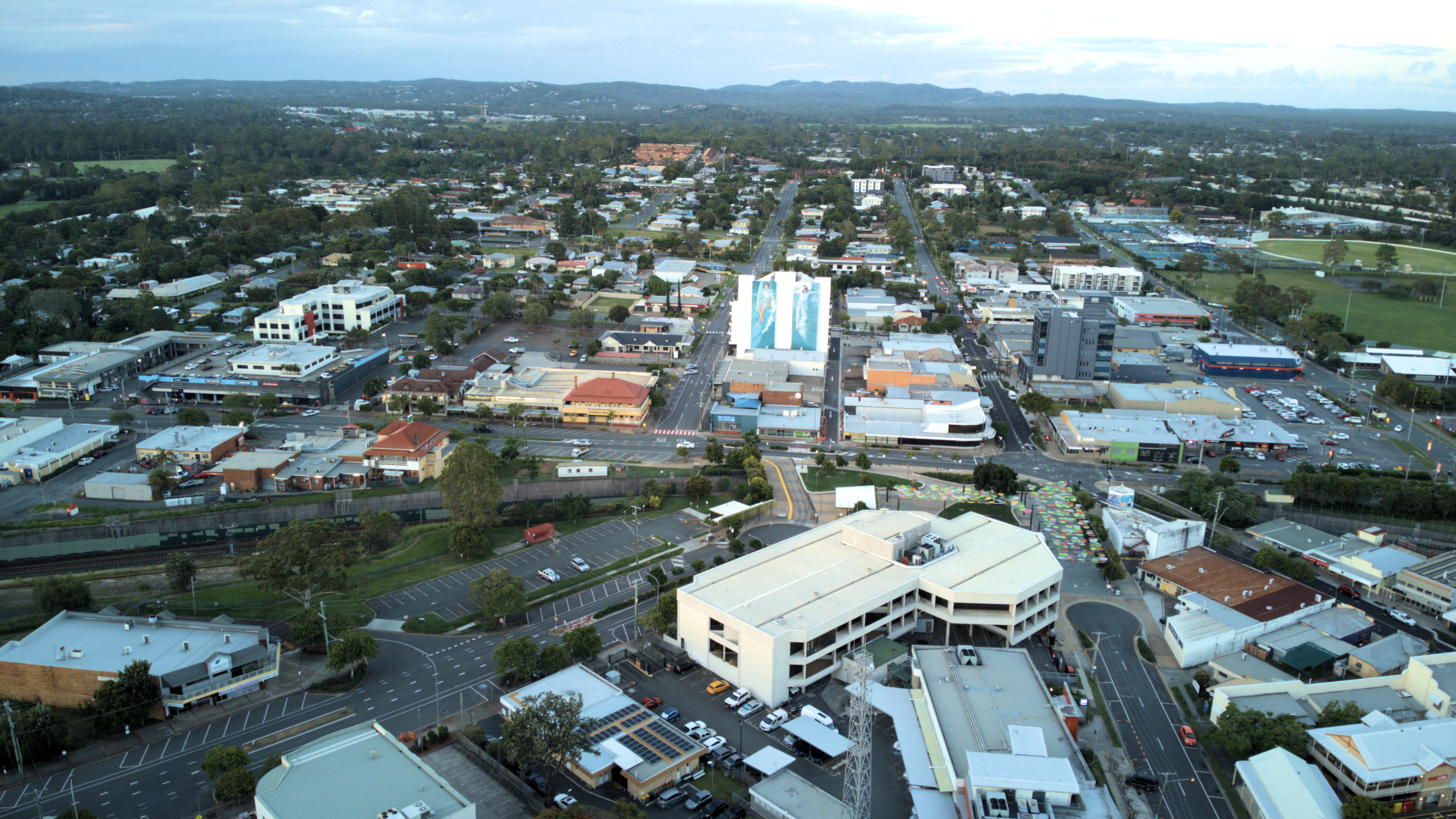
- Aerial view of Beenleigh

- Coordinates: 27.7161°S 153.2022°E
- Country: Australia
- State: Queensland
- City: City of Logan
- LGA: Logan City
- Location: 14.5 km (9.0 mi) SE of Logan Central; 35.4 km (22.0 mi) SSE of Brisbane CBD
- Established: 1866

Government
  - State electorate: Macalister
  - Federal division: Forde

Area
  - Total: 7.7 km^{2} (3.0 sq mi)

Population
  - Total: 8,425 (2021 census)
  - Density: 1,094/km^{2} (2,834/sq mi)
- Time zone: UTC+10:00 (AEST)
- Postcode: 4207
Localities around Beenleigh
Loganholme	Loganholme	Eagleby
Holmview	Beenleigh	Eagleby
Bahrs Scrub	Mount Warren Park	Yatala; Stapylton

Beenleigh is a town and suburb in the City of Logan, Queensland, Australia. In the 2021 census, the suburb of Beenleigh had a population of 8,425 people.

A government survey for the new town was conducted in 1866. The town is the terminus for the Beenleigh railway line, which first opened in 1885 and a stop on the South Coast railway line, which reached Southport in 1889. Beenleigh was the administrative centre of the former Shire of Albert. It is known for the heritage-listed tourist attraction called the Beenleigh Artisan Distillery. In recent years it has seen many high rise developments.

== Geography ==
Beenleigh is 33 km south-east of central Brisbane, as well as, and its adjoining suburbs, are located near the confluence of the Logan and Albert Rivers. The urban centre lies southwest of the Pacific Motorway after it crosses the Logan River and is crossed by the Gold Coast railway line. Logan River Parklands contain a boat ramp, barbeques, and a picnic area. Whilst it was once a stand-alone town built on sugar and home to Australia's oldest rum distillery built in 1864, increasing development in South East Queensland since the 1980s has seen it enveloped by Brisbane and the Gold Coast.

There are two railway stations in the suburb (from north to south):

- Holmview railway station (27.7095°S 153.1876°E)
- Beenleigh railway station (27.7176°S 153.2047°E)

== History ==
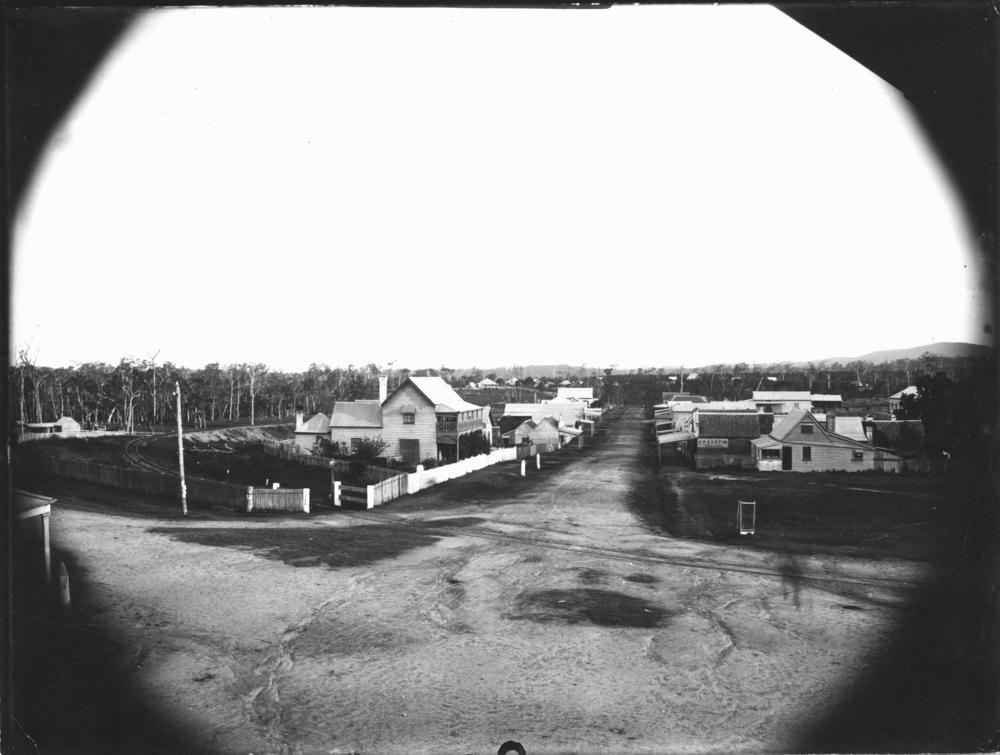
Main Street circa 1893

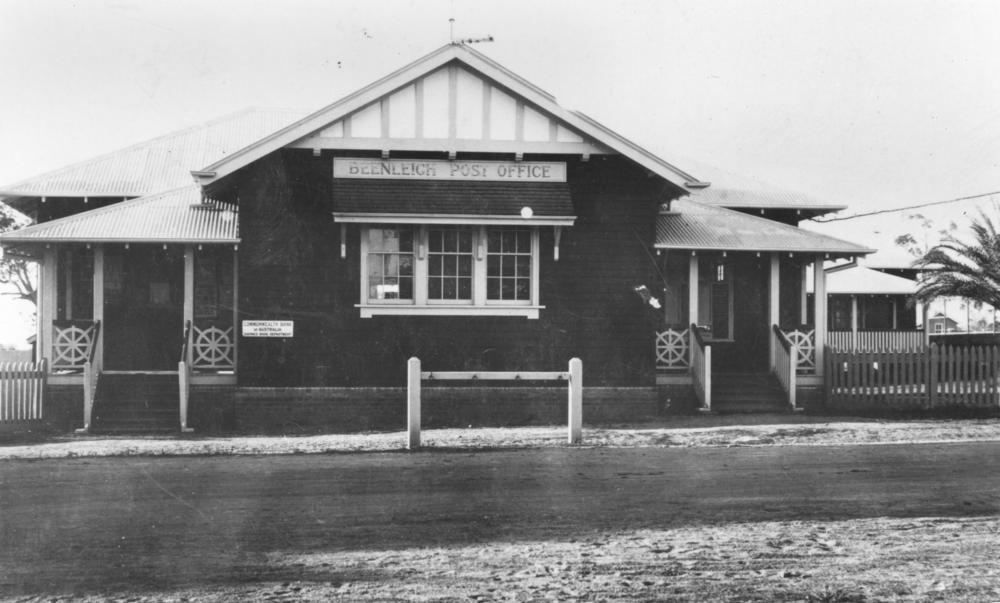
Beenleigh Post Office, circa 1929

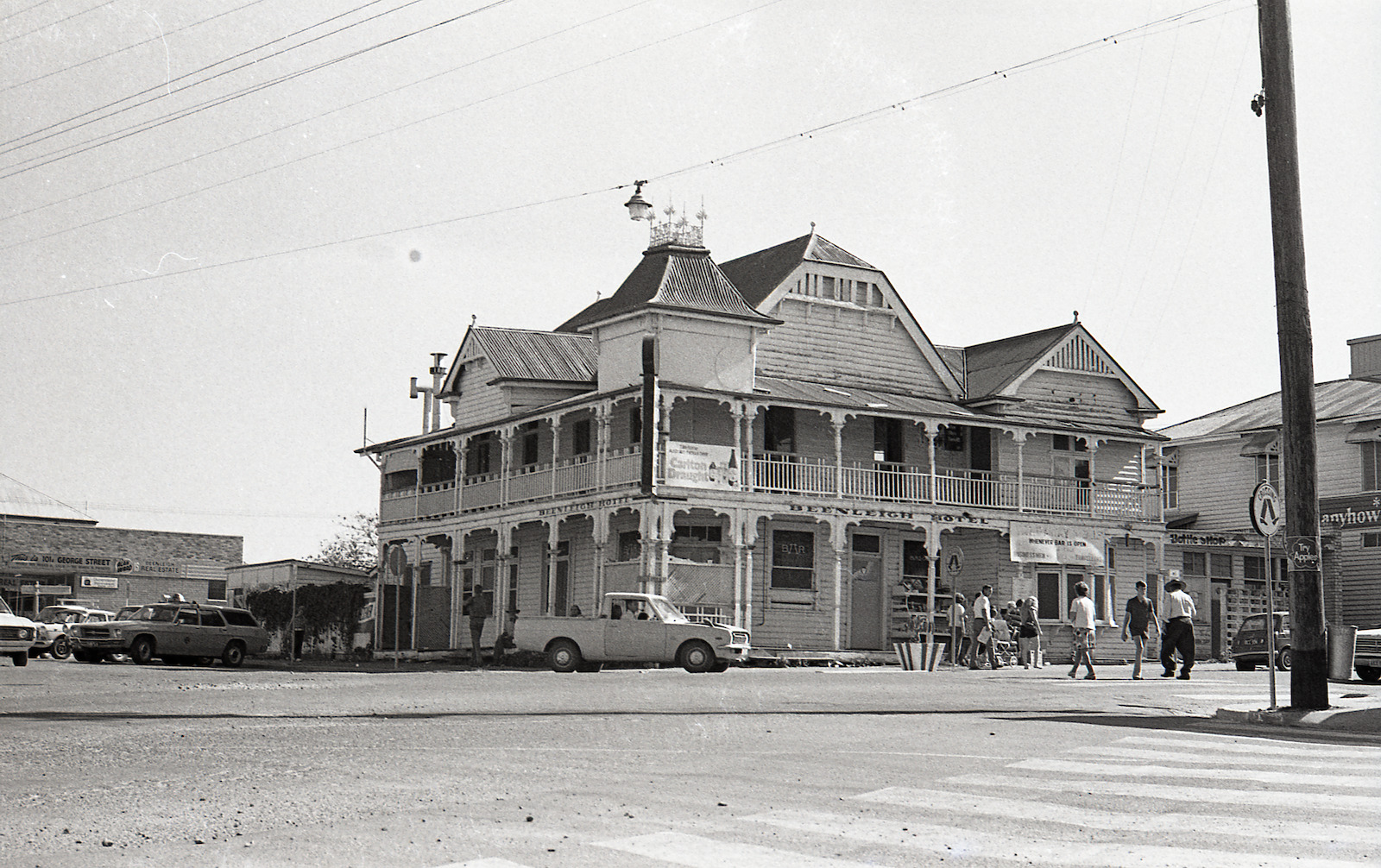
The Beenleigh Hotel in the town of Beenleigh, Queensland in 1975.

Beenleigh is situated in the Bundjalung traditional Indigenous Australian country. The Yugambeh people are custodians within the traditional Aboriginal Bundjalung country, antedating European settlement by tens of thousands of years. Their Yugambeh language and heritage survive and is a testament to the Yugambeh Museum located in the town. Yugembah (also known as Yugumbir, Jugambel, Jugambeir, Jugumbir, Jukam, Jukamba) is one of the Australian Aboriginal languages in areas that include the Beenleigh, Beaudesert, Gold Coast, Logan, Scenic Rim, Albert River, Coolangatta, Coomera, Logan River, Pimpama, Tamborine and Tweed River Valley, within the local government boundaries of the City of Gold Coast, City of Logan, Scenic Rim Regional Council and the Tweed River Valley.

Beenleigh was first colonised in the 1860s, with the first permanent European settlement occurring by John Davy and Frank Gooding, who named their sugarcane plantation Beenleigh in memory of their family estate in Devon, England.

William Fryar surveyed the Town of Beenleigh in July 1866.

The first sugarcane mill was built in 1867, and by 1885, another 29 were operational.

Beenleigh Post Office opened on 1 August 1867.

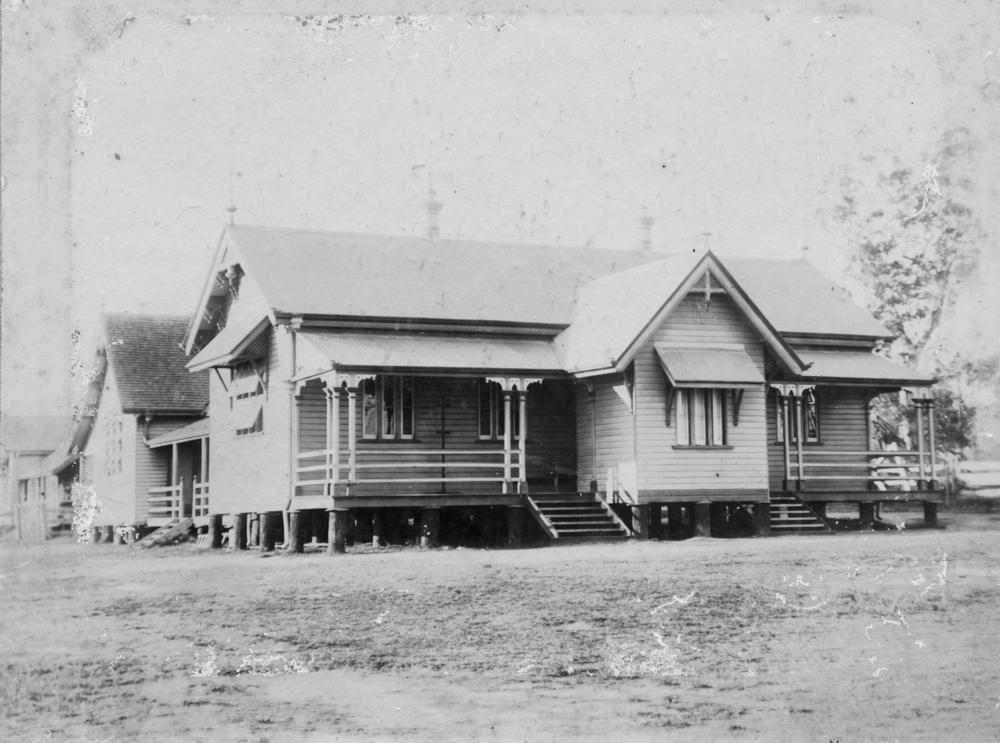
Beenleigh State School, 1897

Beenleigh State School was opened on 6 February 1871. From 1954 to 1962 it also had a secondary department. From 4 February 1974 to 1980 the school had an Opportunity Class to provide special education.

St George's Anglican Church was officially opened on Thursday 16 September 1875. A second St George's was built next door at 10 Tansey Street in 1964. In 1981 the first church building was moved to its present site at the Beenleigh Historical Village in Main Street (27.7235°S 153.2133°E) and has been repaired.

On 3 December 1885, 85 resubdivided allotments of "Beenleigh Township Estate" were advertised to be auctioned by J.R. Dickson and Co. on 26 December 1885. A map advertising the auction states that the Estate was close to the Beenleigh Railway Station and was the property of the late Peter Benz.

In October 1886, a well-known property on the Albert River owned by W. K. Witty called "Yellowwood Estate" was advertised for subdivision into suitable sized farms and then auctioned by Simon Fraser & Son. A map advertising the auction states that 40 choice farms were available and the auction was to be held on Saturday 27 November at the Palm's Hotel, Beenleigh.

Beenleigh Wesleyan Methodist Church opened on Sunday 28 November 1886. Separate tenders for materials and labour were called in July 1886, which indicated the church was to be built of timber and be 42 feet 6 inches (12.95 m) by 22 feet 6 inches (6.86 m).

Commercial dairying in the area began in 1889.

In June 1922, 12 portions of farm land located on the Logan River were advertised to be auctioned by Cameron Bros Auctioneers. A map advertising the auction states that the land was within easy reach of Cleveland Railway Station and Beenleigh, and that there was a steamer service weekly. The land was advertised as suitable for growing arrowroot and sugarcane and magnificent for dairying.

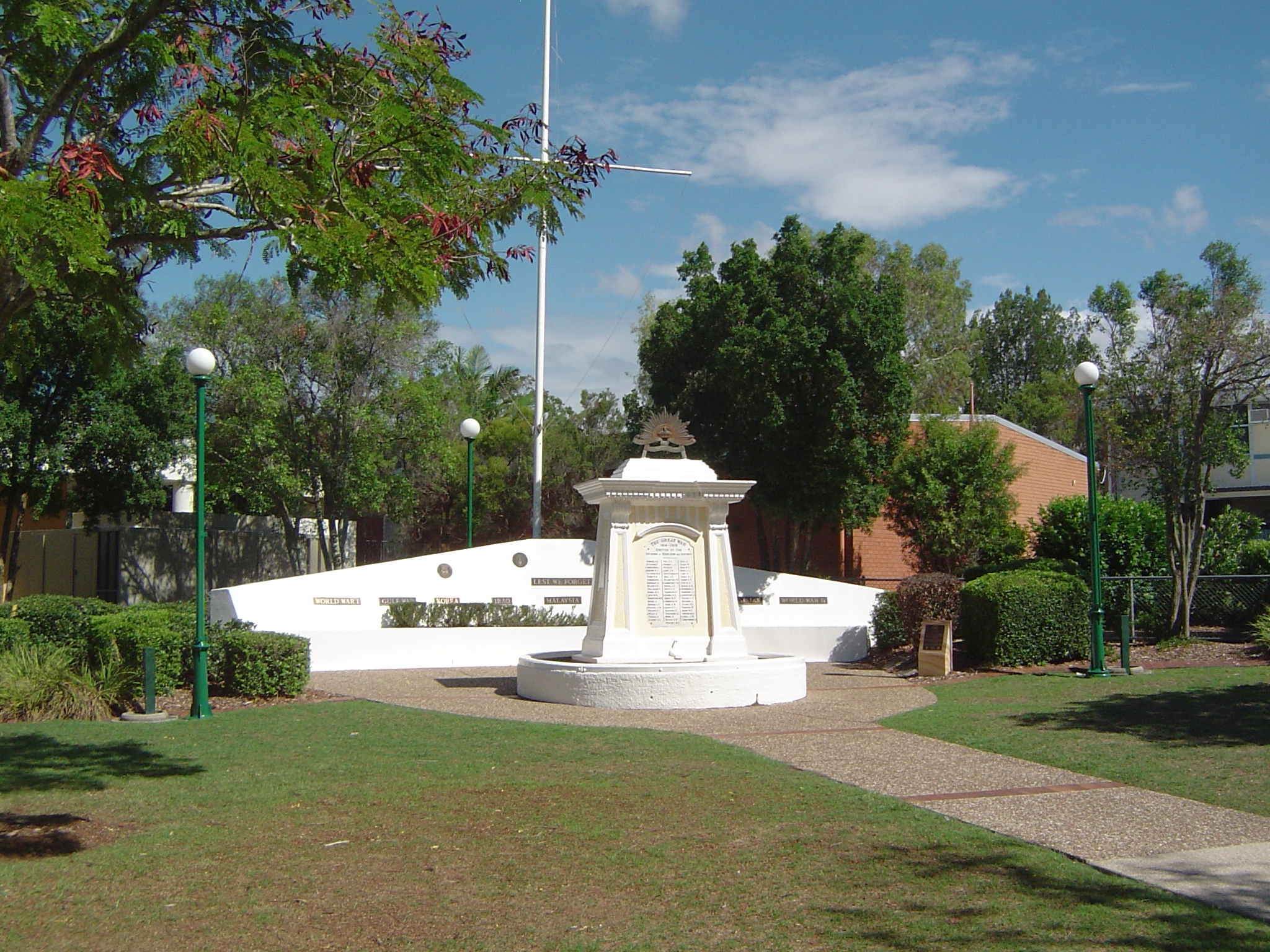
Beenleigh Memorial Park, 2014

The Beenleigh Memorial Park was dedicated on 21 August 1925.

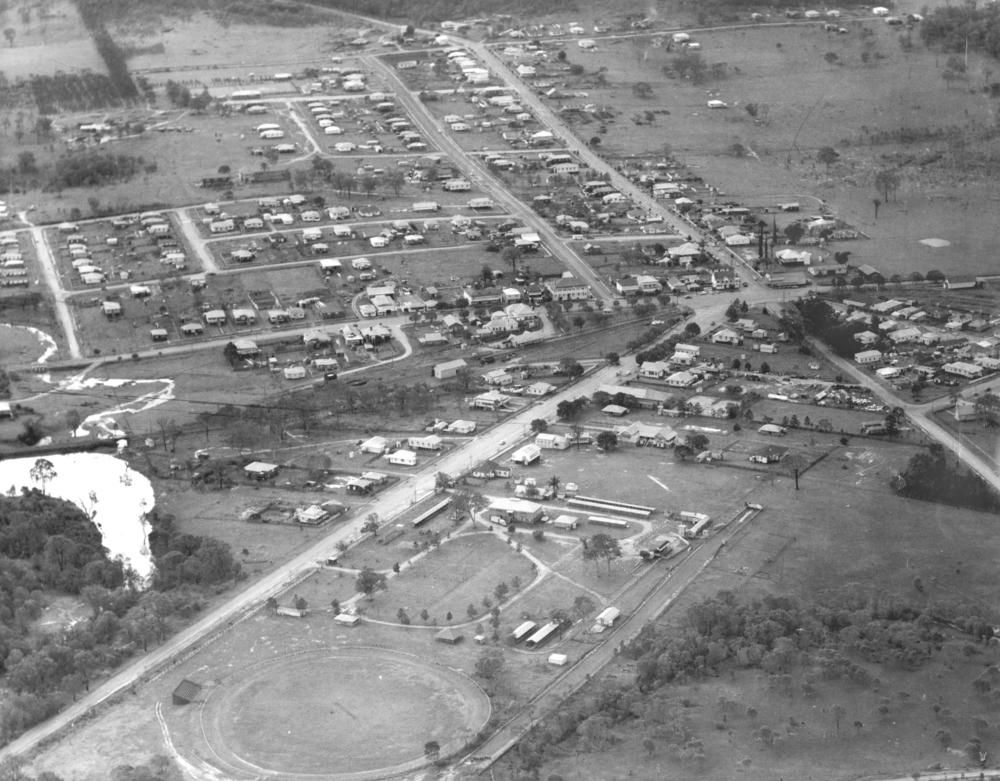
An aerial view of Beenleigh in 1954

The abattoir was established in 1952 for beef production, and is still one of the largest industries in Beenleigh. Beenleigh State High School opened on 29 January 1963. Beenleigh Special School opened on 1 January 1981.

St Joseph's Tobruk Memorial School opened on 25 October 1953.

Beenleigh State High School opened on 29 Jan 1963, replacing the secondary department at Beenleigh State School.

Beenleigh Special School opened in January 1981, replacing the opportunity class at Beenleigh State School.

Trinity College opened on 25 January 1982.

Beenleigh was the centre of the Beenleigh Shire until 1949, then Shire of Albert, which also included the suburbs of Eagleby, Alberton, Mt Warren Park, Windaroo, Edens Landing, Holmview, Pimpama, and Jacobs Well. In 1995, Albert Shire was dissolved and Beenleigh and the surrounding suburbs were then amalgamated into City of Gold Coast. In 2008, these suburbs were transferred from Gold Coast City to City of Logan (despite protests from locals, who voted against being part of Logan).

Beenleigh Mitre 10 MEGA opened in 2004; it was the company's first Australian MEGA store, and it employed over 200 people on opening.

== Demographics ==
In the 2011 census, the suburb of Beenleigh had a population of 8,244 people, 49.5% female and 50.5% male. The median age of the Beenleigh population was 34 years, compared to the national median age of 37; 66.9% of people living in Beenleigh were born in Australia. The other top responses for country of birth were New Zealand 8.1%, England 3.4%, the Philippines 1.1%, Brazil 0.6%, and Germany 0.5%. About 81.5% of people spoke only English at home; the next-most common languages were 0.7% Portuguese, 0.6% Tagalog, 0.6% Vietnamese, 0.4% Spanish, and 0.3% German.

In the 2016 census, the suburb of Beenleigh had a population of 8,252 people, 49.7% female and 50.3% male. The median age of the Beenleigh population was 37 years, compared to the national median age of 38. 69.2% of people living in Beenleigh were born in Australia. The other top responses for country of birth were New Zealand 8.0%, England 3.2%, the Philippines 1.4%, India 0.6%, and Germany 0.5%. 82.9% of people spoke only English at home; the next-most common languages were 0.8% Tagalog, 0.4% Samoan, 0.4% Malayalam, 0.4% Vietnamese, and 0.4% Maori (New Zealand).

In the 2021 census, the suburb of Beenleigh had a population of 8,425 people, 49.8% female and 50.2% male. The median age of the Beenleigh population was 38 years, on par with the national median age of 38. 66.3% of people living in Beenleigh were born in Australia. The other top responses for country of birth were New Zealand 7.7%, England 2.8%, the Philippines 1.7%, India 1.0%, and Papua New Guinea 0.5%. 79.0% of people spoke only English at home; the next-most common languages were 0.8% Tagalog, 0.5% Maori (New Zealand), 0.5% Punjabi, 0.5% Mandarin, and 0.5% Filipino.

== Heritage listings ==
Beenleigh has a number of heritage-listed sites, including:

- Beenleigh Rum Distillery, Distillery Road (27.72331°S 153.22196°E)
- St George's Anglican Church, Main Street (27.7234°S 153.2133°E)

== Education ==
Beenleigh State School is a government primary (Preparatory to Year 6) school for boys and girls at 22 James Street (27.7179°S 153.1997°E). In 2023, the school had an enrolment of 448 students with 35 teachers (32 full-time equivalent) and 27 non-teaching staff (17 full-time equivalent). It includes a special education program.

Despite its name, Beenleigh Special School is located in neighbouring Mount Warren Park.

St Joseph's Tobruk Memorial School is a Catholic primary (Preparatory to Year 6) school for boys and girls at 53 Kokoda Street (27.7116°S 153.1996°E). In 2023, the school had an enrolment of 448 students with 32 teachers (30 full-time equivalent) and 21 non-teaching staff (14 full-time equivalent).

Beenleigh State High School is a government secondary (Year 7 to 12) school for boys and girls on Alamein Street (27.7153°S 153.2044°E). In 2023, the school had an enrolment of 1,977 students with 136 teachers (132 full-time equivalent) and 113 non-teaching staff (85 full-time equivalent). It includes a special education program.

Trinity College is a Catholic secondary (Year 7 to 12) school for boys and girls on Scott Street (27.7104°S 153.1988°E). In 2023, the school had an enrolment of 942 students with 72 teachers (70 full-time equivalent) and 33 non-teaching staff (29 full-time equivalent).

== Facilities ==
Beenleigh Police Station is at 3 Kent Street (27.7173°S 153.2016°E).

Beenleigh SES Facility is at 36 Martens Street (27.7249°S 153.2184°E).

== Amenities ==
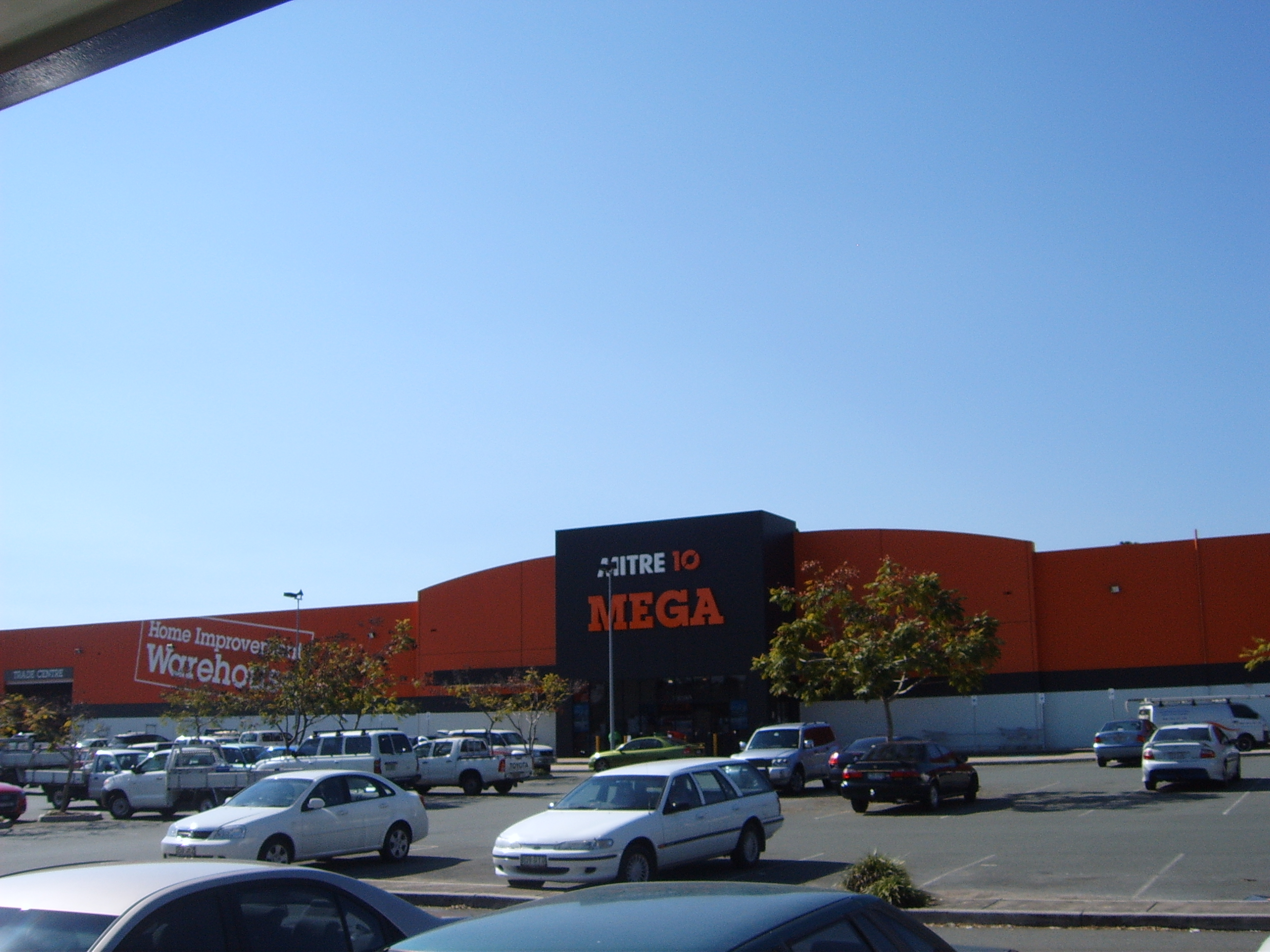
Beenleigh Mitre 10 MEGA

Still predominately a self-sufficient town with expanding retail and commercial areas close by, Beenleigh is home to three shopping centres with Coles Supermarkets, Woolworths, Big W, Aldi, and a Mitre 10 MEGA.

At the heart of Beenleigh stands the Southern District Court complex, first established in 1871. For many years, the court was constituted solely of three magistrates; this changed with the allocation of a permanent sitting District Court of Queensland Judge in 1998. The first presiding district court judge in Beenleigh was Judge O'Brien. Recently, the Southern District Court complex has played an integral role in the development of the progressive Drug Court.

The town has a community centre and two theatres (Crete Street Theatre and Phoenix Ensemble).

The Logan City Council operate a public library at Crete Street.

The Beenleigh branch of the Queensland Country Women's Association meets at the Beenleigh Neighbourhood Centre at 10 James Street.

St George's Anglican Church is at 10 Tansey Street (27.7186°S 153.2018°E).

Beenleigh Region Uniting Church is at 32-50 Mount Warren Boulevard in neighbouring Mount Warren Park.

Day care facilities are available at the Lutheran Beenleigh Family Day Care Scheme.

There are a number of parks in the area, including:

- Bill Norris Oval (27.7062°S 153.1930°E)
- Dauth Park (27.7118°S 153.2055°E)
- Emerald Park (27.7180°S 153.1881°E)
- Hammel Park (27.7191°S 153.1959°E)
- Hugh Muntz Park (27.7186°S 153.2091°E)
- Ibis Park (27.7181°S 153.1896°E)
- Logan River Parklands (27.6986°S 153.1932°E)
- Tallangandra Road Park (27.7272°S 153.1903°E)
- Willow Park (27.7182°S 153.1850°E)

== Transport ==
Beenleigh is situated on the Pacific Motorway. Queensland Rail Citytrain network provides frequent services to Brisbane and the Gold Coast via the Beenleigh railway line at the centrally located Beenleigh railway station.

== Attractions ==
The Beenleigh Historical Village (27.7231°S 153.2134°E) preserves 20 historic buildings and houses a number of collections of historic material from the region.

The town is also home to the Beenleigh Artisan Distillers, Australia's oldest rum distillery, Yugambeh Language and Research Centre, Poppy's Chocolates and Windaroo Organic Cottage just 5 minutes out of town.

Various scenes for the 2024 Netflix limited series Boy Swallows Universe were filmed in and around Beenleigh, including at the Rob Nay Memorial Pool (commonly known as the Beenleigh Pool, and officially the Beenleigh Aquatic Centre), and a house at 5 Cameron Street. During filming, the house’s interior was extensively renovated, the house itself painted a coat of blue, and a white veranda and wooden fence added to the front of the property. After production wrapped, the house was restored to its original state and colour scheme.

== Events ==
Social events of note are the annual Rum, Rump and Rhumba Festival, the Beenleigh Cane Gala Ball and Parade, Eats and Beats Food Trucks, and the Beenleigh Show.

== Sport and recreation ==
Sporting facilities that are represented in Beenleigh cover baseball, soccer, BMX, football, tennis, swimming, netball, and roller derby. Beenleigh enjoys access to the Logan River via a boat ramp located near the northern bridge on the Pacific Motorway.

== Notable People from Beenleigh ==
- Alan Cann, rugby league player
- Tonie Carroll, rugby league player
- Tori Groves-Little, AFLW footballer.
- Sonia Kruger, actress, dancer, media personality
- Tony Lynn, AFL footballer
- Jordan Membrey, AFLW footballer
- Phil Stockman, baseballer
- Brett Voss, AFL footballer
- Michael Voss, AFL footballer
