= Trinity College, Beenleigh =

Trinity College

Location
- Beenleigh, Queensland; Australia; 27°42′39″S 153°11′54″E

Information
- Type: Independent co-educational secondary day school
- Motto: In God we Trust
- Denomination: Roman Catholic
- Opened: 1982; 44 years ago
- Principal: Allison Elcoate
- Years: 7–12
- Enrolment: 942 (2023)
- Song: Sub tuum
- Affiliation: Association of Marist Schools of Australia
- Alumni: Old Trinitarians
- Website: trinitycollege.qld.edu.au

Trinity College is an independent, Roman Catholic, co-educational secondary school located in Beenleigh, Queensland, Australia. It is administered by Brisbane Catholic Education and is a constituent school of the Queensland Catholic Education Commission. As of 2023, Trinity College had an enrolment of 942 students and a teaching staff of 72.

== History ==
The school opened on 25 January 1982 by the Marist Brothers, with the Sisters of St. Joseph joining the staff of the College for the first three years. It is near Saint Joseph's Tobruk Memorial School and convent, which were opened in October 1953. In comparison, Beenleigh State High School was opened in 1963. Saint Patrick's Catholic Church is in an adjoining street.

== Notable alumni ==
- Michael Voss, AFL player, attended the school in the late 1980s.
- Jordan Membrey. AFLW player, attended the school in the 2010s.
