= Brett Voss =

Australian rules footballer, born 1978

Personal information
- Born: 22 February 1978 (age 48); Queensland
- Original team: Morningside (QAFL)
- Debut: Round 5, 27 April 1997, Brisbane vs. Port Adelaide, at Football Park
- Height: 181 cm (5 ft 11 in)
- Weight: 81 kg (179 lb)

Playing career^{1}
Years	Club	Games (Goals)
1997–2000	Brisbane Lions	35 (11)
2001–2007	St Kilda	135 (56)
Total		170 (67)
- ^{1} Playing statistics correct to the end of 2007.

Career highlights
- St Kilda pre-season premiership 2004

Brett Charles Voss (born 22 February 1978) is a former Australian rules footballer who played with the Brisbane Lions and the St Kilda Football Club.

== Early life ==
Voss was born in Queensland and raised in Beenleigh in Logan City, Brisbane where he was schooled at Trinity College, Beenleigh, the younger brother of Michael Voss and the cousin of another AFL Beenleigh local Tony Lynn. He played both junior and senior football with the Morningside club.

He was drafted by the Brisbane Bears as a zone selection in 1995.

== AFL career ==
Voss played in St Kilda’s 2004 AFL Wizard Home Loans Cup winning side – St Kilda Football Club’s 2nd AFL Cup Win.

After some deliberation at the end of the season, and after consultation with coach Ross Lyon, 29-year-old Voss announced his retirement on 18 September 2007.
