= Cabbage Tree Point =

Cabbage Tree Point may refer to several places in Australia:

- Cabbage Tree Point (Brisbane), a headland in Shorncliffe, Brisbane, Queensland
- Cabbage Tree Point (Gold Coast), an unbounded locality within Steiglitz, Queensland
