= Beenleigh Historical Village =

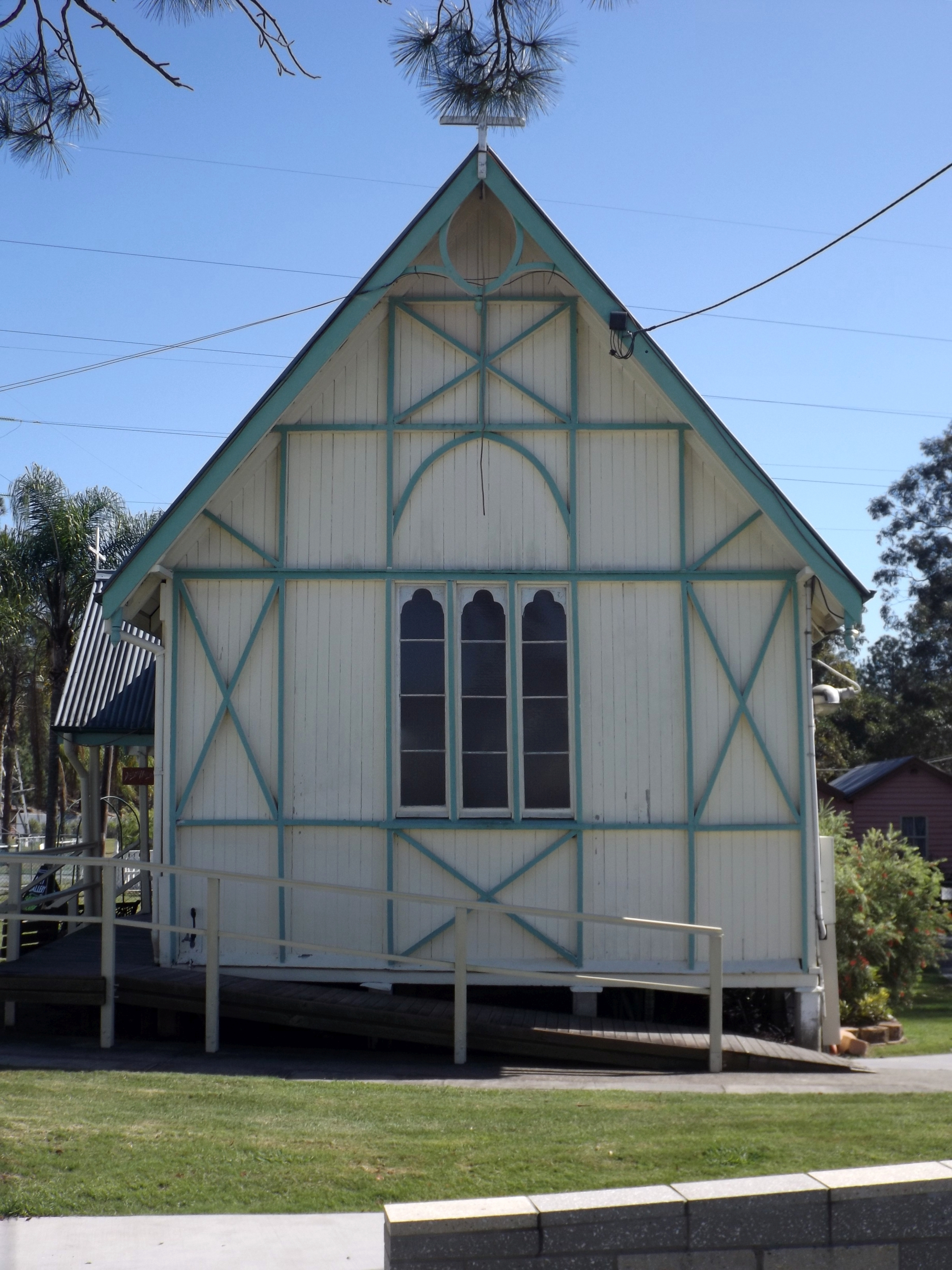
St George's Anglican Church, 2015

The Beenleigh Historical Village and Museum is an open-air museum at Main Street, Beenleigh, City of Logan, Queensland, Australia. It preserves twenty buildings from Beenleigh's past which contain many collections related to the history of this district.

== History ==
in July 2019 the Heck family homestead "‘Friedensheim" (House of Peace), then at 129 Mill Road, Woongoolba, opposite the Rocky Point Sugar Mill (27.7345°S 153.3263°E), was divided into three pieces and relocated to the museum. Following work to reconstruct and restore the building, it was officially reopened in November 2021 at the museum. The homestead was built in 1914 for the Heck family who operated the sugar mill but had not been used as a home since the 1970s.

On 23 September 2018, a time capsule was buried near to the entrance of the historical village, containing potential items of intrigue to future generations and letters written by local school children, to be opened 46 years hence. The ceremony was overseen by then-Governor of Queensland, Paul de Jersey.

== Buildings ==
The buildings preserved on the site include:

- the heritage-listed former St George's Anglican Church
- the council chambers of the former Shire of Beenleigh
- the Loganholme School building
- the original 1885 Beenleigh railway station building
- the Heck family homestead "‘Friedensheim"

== See also ==
- List of museums in Queensland
