= Beenleigh State School =

Primary school in Queensland, Australia

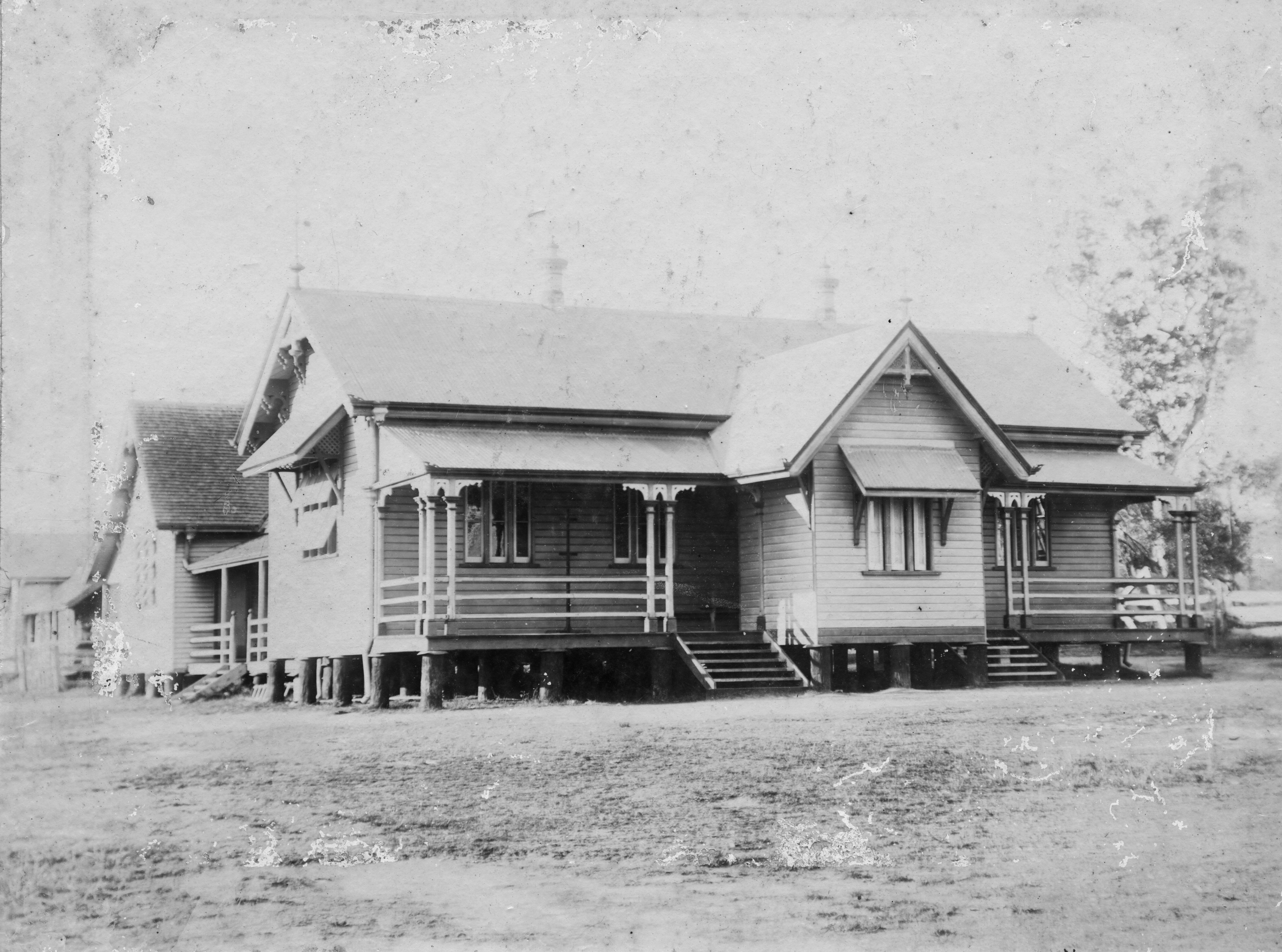
- Beenleigh State School, 1897

Location
- 22 James Street, Beenleigh, Queensland, Australia
- Coordinates: 27.7179°S 153.1998°E

Information
- School type: Public, coeducational
- Motto: Nothing but the best
- Established: 1871
- Principal: Adam Knights
- Grades: Prep – Year 6
- Enrolment: 448 (2023)
- Color(s): Light Blue; Dark Blue
- Website: Official site

Beenleigh State School is a public co-educational primary school located in the Logan City suburb of Beenleigh, Queensland, Australia. It is administered by the Queensland Department of Education, with an enrolment of 448 students and a teaching staff of 35, as of 2023. The school caters to students from Prep to Year 6.

== History ==
The school opened on 6 February 1871, with 97 pupils, and prior to 1925 it was also known as Beenleigh State Rural School. Student enrolment was stated to be 161 in February 1879, with an average attendance of 103.

The foundation principal was Mr. Massey, followed by Thomas Bradbury, who was principal from 1876 to 1897; he died by drowning, his death reported in January 1898. The Successor of Mr. Bradbury was Mr. D. S. Warren from 1898 until he was transferred to Brisbane in 1908.

A new teacher's residence and the reroofing of the school building was approved by the Minister for Public Works in July 1908; it was estimated to cost £586 10s at the time.

The schools 50th jubilee was celebrated on Friday, 11 November 1921, at the showgrounds. All the schools within the district joined in on the celebration, with "sports and pastimes" being the main event. Approximately 20 students from the school's foundation attended.

From 1954 to 1962 it also had a secondary department, and from 4 February 1974 to 1980 the school had an Opportunity Class to provide special education. In January 1981 it became a separate school, Beenleigh Special School.

== Demographics ==
In 2023, the school had a student enrolment of 448 with 35 teachers (32 full-time equivalent) and 27 non-teaching staff (16 full-time equivalent). Female enrolments consisted of 211 students and Male enrolments consisted of 237 students; Indigenous enrolments accounted for a total of 16% of total enrolments and 20% of students had a language background other than English.

== See also ==
- Education in Queensland
- List of Schools in Greater Brisbane
