= Windaroo, Queensland =

Windaroo
- Suburb
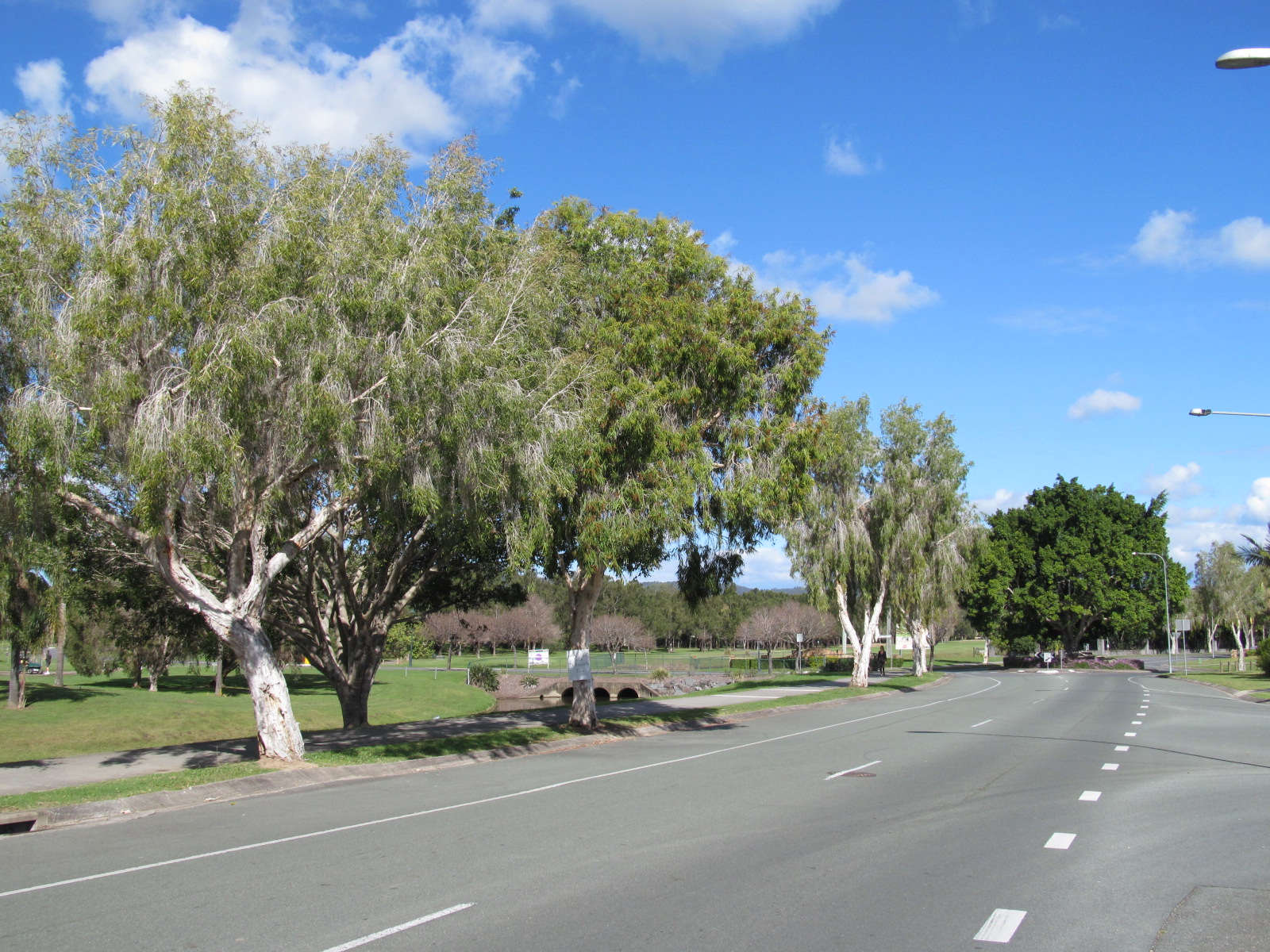
- Windaroo Road, 2013

- Interactive map of Windaroo
- Coordinates: 27.7455°S 153.1936°E
- Country: Australia
- State: Queensland
- City: Logan City
- LGA: Logan City
- Location: 18.1 km (11.2 mi) SE of Logan Central; 39.5 km (24.5 mi) SSE of Brisbane CBD
- Established: 1981

Government
  - State electorate: Macalister
  - Federal division: Forde

Area
  - Total: 1.9 km^{2} (0.73 sq mi)

Population
  - Total: 2,771 (2021 census)
  - Density: 1,460/km^{2} (3,780/sq mi)
- Time zone: UTC+10:00 (AEST)
- Postcode: 4207
Suburbs around Windaroo
Bahrs Scrub	Mount Warren Park	Mount Warren Park
Bahrs Scrub	Windaroo	Yatala
Belivah	Bannockburn	Yatala

Windaroo is a residential suburb in the outer southern areas of the City of Logan, Queensland, Australia. In the 2021 census, Windaroo had a population of 2,771 people.

== Geography ==
The suburb is located 4 km south of Beenleigh and 36 km south-east of central Brisbane, bounded to the north by Windaroo Creek, to the east by the Albert River, to the south by Bannockburn Road, and to the west by Beaudesert–Beenleigh Road.

== History ==
The suburb was named after the Windaroo sugar plantation, one of several nineteenth century enterprises along the Albert River. The area remained essentially rural until the late 1970s, when a rural residential estate, Windaroo Acres, was subdivided, with the land being first released for sale in 1983, prior to this, the land was used for dairying.

The suburb was named and bounded on 1 June 1981.

Windaroo State School opened on 28 January 1992. It is now within neighbouring Mount Warren Park.

Windaroo Valley State High School opened on 1 January 1994. It is now within neighbouring Bahrs Scrub.

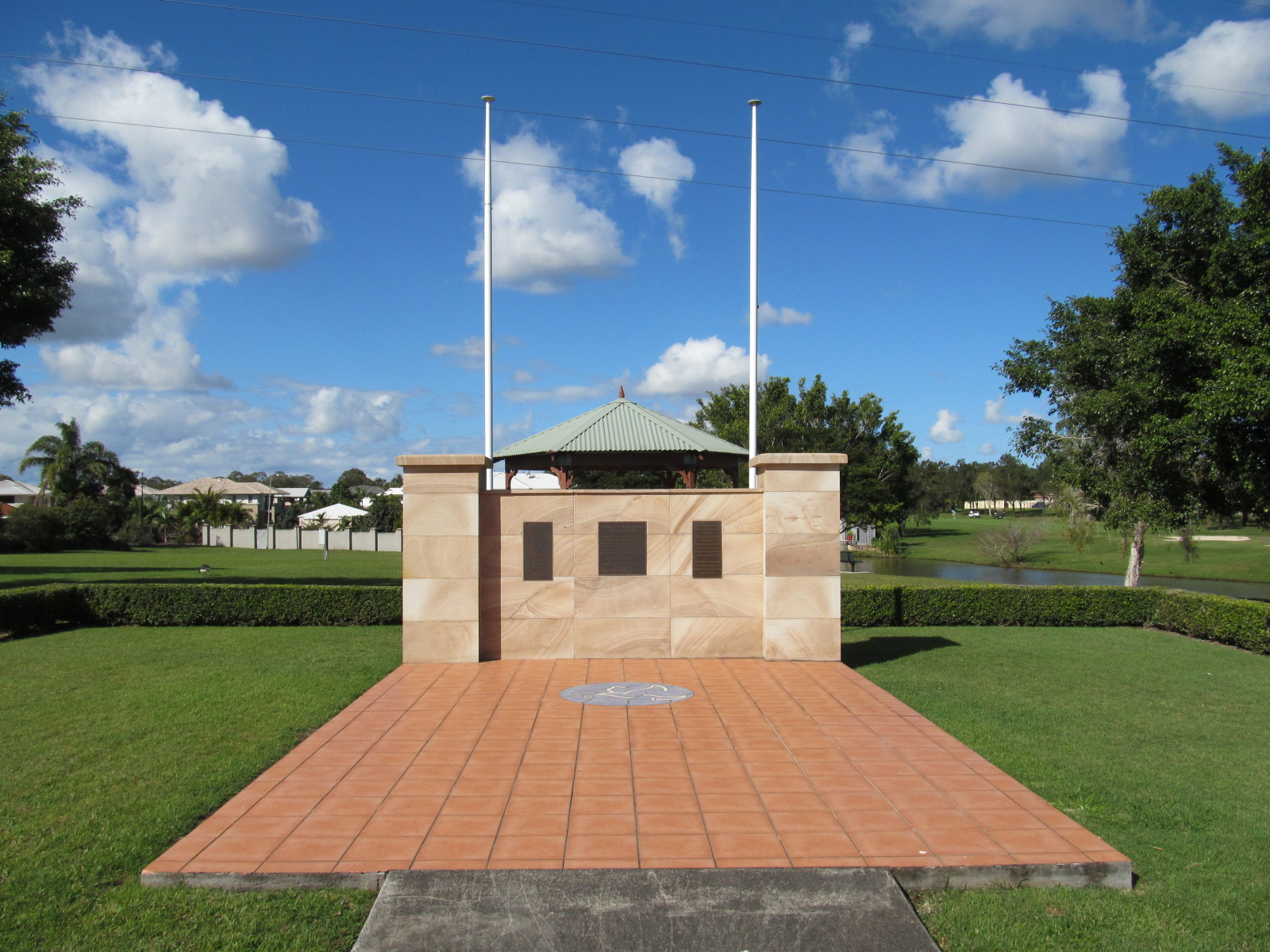
Windaroo Australian Peace Keepers Memorial, 2013

On Sunday 29 October 2000, the Windaroo Australian Peacekeepers Memorial was dedicated to military personnel and civilians who had served in Australia's peace-keeping missions.

Until 2008, Windaroo was within the local government area of City of Gold Coast. However, local government boundary changes in 2008 transferred suburbs north of the Albert River (including Windaroo) into the City of Logan, even though a plebiscite held in 2007 found 2,534 residents supported the change while 10,821 were opposed.

== Demographics ==
In the 2011 census, Windaroo had a population of 2,715 people, 50.9% female and 49.1% male. The median age of the Windaroo population was 36 years, 1 year below the national median of 37. 70.6% of people living in Windaroo were born in Australia. The other top responses for country of birth were England 8.9%, New Zealand 7.4%, South Africa 1.1%, Scotland 0.8%, Ireland 0.6%. 91.2% of people spoke only English at home; the next most common languages were 0.7% Romanian, 0.6% Mandarin, 0.4% Spanish, 0.3% Russian, 0.3% German.

In the 2016 census, Windaroo had a population of 2,827 people, 49.6% female and 50.4% male. The median age of the Windaroo population was 38, being on par with the national median of 38. 73.6% of people living in Windaroo were born in Australia. The other top responses for country of birth were England 8.1%, New Zealand 6.8%, South Africa 1.0%, Scotland 0.6%, and Germany 0.5%. 90.9% of people spoke only English at home; the next most common languages were 0.5% Japanese, 0.4% Afrikaans, 0.4% Spanish, 0.4% German, and 0.4% Mandarin.

In the 2021 census, Windaroo had a population of 2,771 people, 50.8% female and 49.2% male. The median age of the Windaroo population was 40, 2 years above the national median of 38. 76.4% of people living in Windaroo were born in Australia. The other top responses for country of birth were England 7.4%, New Zealand 6.7%, South Africa 1.2%, Scotland 0.5%, and Wales 0.4%. 93.7% of people spoke only English at home; the next most common languages were 0.6% Mandarin, 0.4% Russian, 0.4% Romanian, 0.3% Samoan, and 0.3% Arabic.

== Education ==
There are no schools in Windaroo. The nearest government primary school is Windaroo State School in neighbouring Mount Warren Park to the north. The nearest government secondary school is Windaroo Valley State High School in neighbouring Bahrs Scrub to the north-west.

== Amenities ==
Windaroo Lakes Golf Club has an 18-hole golf course at 2 Johanna Place (corner of Anna Louise Terrace, 27.7430°S 153.1982°E). It opened in 1981 and was sold to developer Chris Kerwick of Chima Pty Ltd. in 1990. The golf club was upgraded for the 1993 Queensland Open Golf Championship.

Windaroo Memorial Peace Park is at Carl Heck Boulevard (27.7474°S 153.1915°E). It contains the Windaroo Australian Peace Keepers Memorial.

There are a number of parks in the area:

- Kaiser Drive Park (27.7464°S 153.1869°E)
- Rugby Union Club (27.7371°S 153.1949°E)

== Transport ==
Windaroo is served by the 565 bus route, operated by Translink. The route runs from Windaroo in the south to Loganholme busway station in the north, also stopping at Beenleigh railway station.
