= St George's Anglican Church, Beenleigh =

Former church in Queensland, Australia

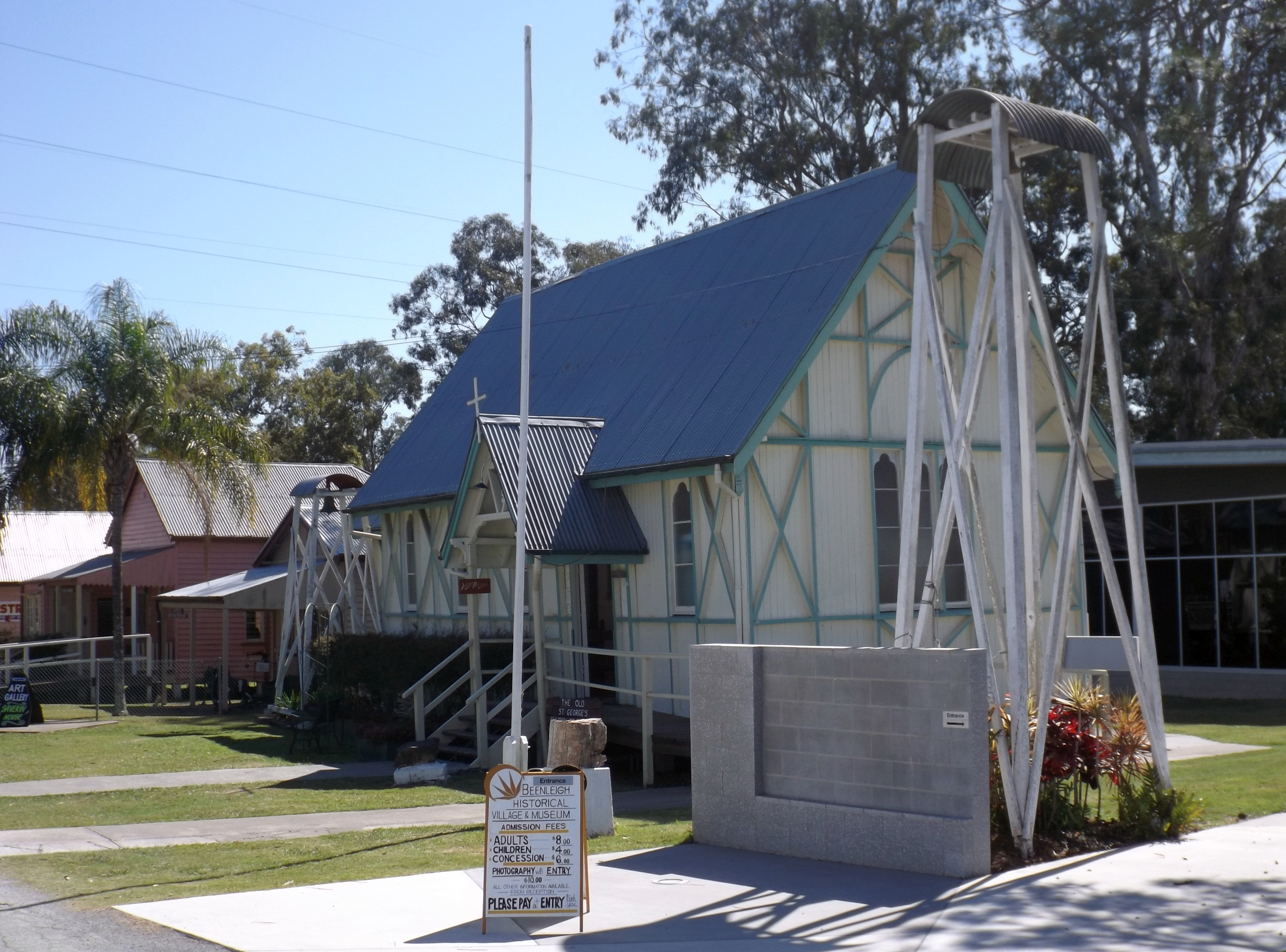
- Church in 2015

- Location within Queensland Location within Australia
- 27.7234°S 153.2133°E
- Location: Beenleigh Historical Village, Main Street, Beenleigh, City of Logan, Queensland, Australia

History
- Design period: 1870s–1890s (late 19th century)
- Built: 1875

Site notes
- Architect: Francis Drummond Greville Stanley

Queensland Heritage Register
- Official name: St George's Anglican Church
- Type: state heritage (built)
- Designated: 21 October 1992
- Reference no.: 600001
- Significant period: 1876 (fabric); 1876–1964, 1981 (historical)
- Significant components: tower – bell / belfry
- Builders: Wohlsen and Ehlers

St George's Anglican Church is a heritage-listed former church in the Beenleigh Historical Village, Main Street, Beenleigh, City of Logan, Queensland, Australia. It was designed by Francis Drummond Greville Stanley and built in 1875 by Wohlsen and Ehlers. It was added to the Queensland Heritage Register on 21 October 1992.

== History ==
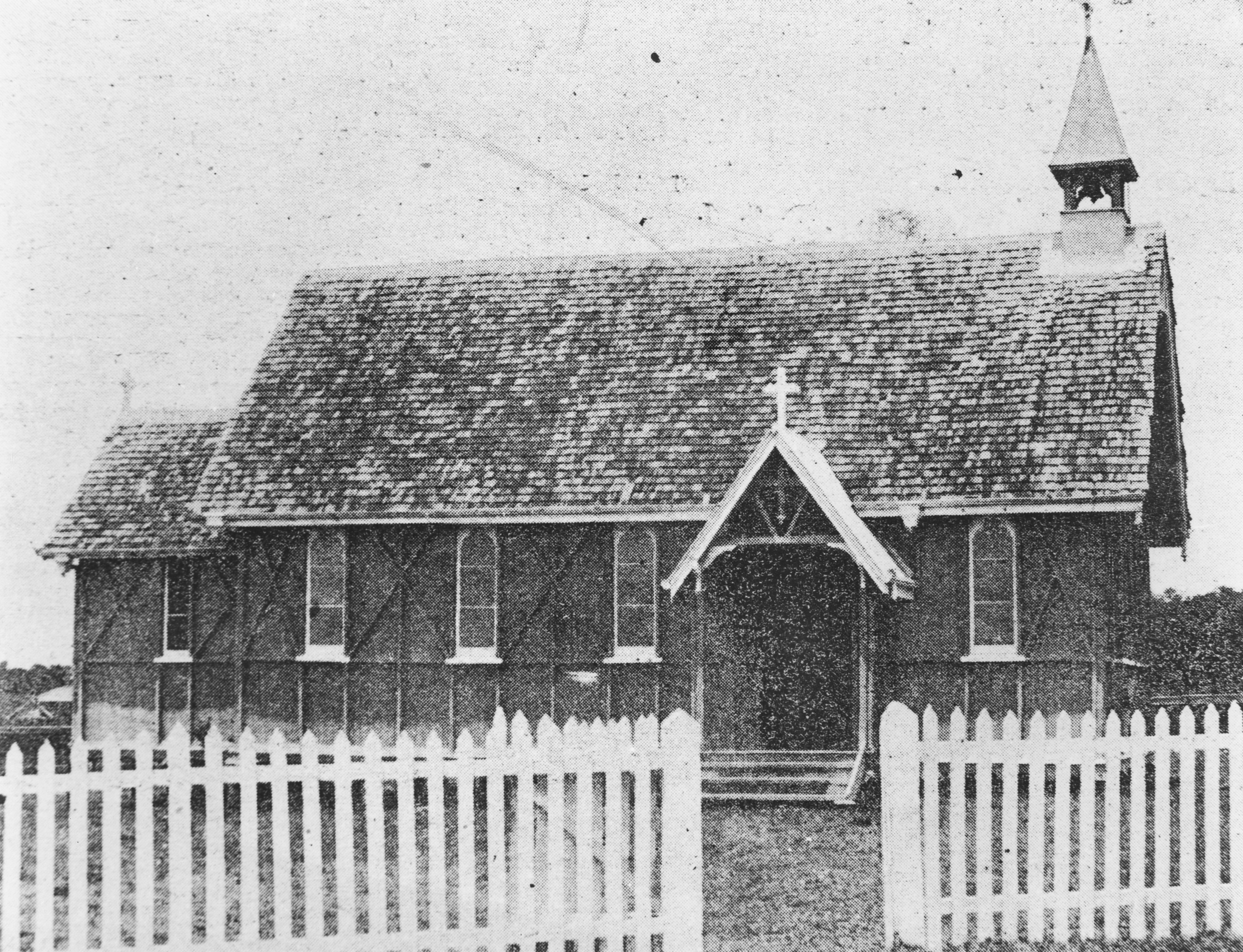
St George's Church of England, Beenleigh, circa 1912

In March 1871, the Reverend Dubois was appointed as the Church of England minister for Beenleigh, preaching his services in the local court house. By August 1871, the congregation were planning to build a church. However, by March 1873, plans for the church slowed when Dubois left the district and the Bishop of Brisbane failed to appoint a replacement minister. In January 1874, the Reverend James Gilbertson was appointed to the district and planning resumed, calling for tenders in May 1874.

The church was built in 1875 by Wohlsen and Ehlers to a design by prominent Brisbane architect FDG Stanley. It was built on land donated by local pioneer Michael Tansey in the street which bears his name. It was officially opened on Thursday 16 September 1875.

It was the first church built in Beenleigh. The town was then part of the Southport Parish and later a mission district before becoming a parish in 1982. A new church (also called St George's Anglican Church) was built next door at 10 Tansey Street in 1964. In 1981 the old church building was moved to its present site at the Beenleigh Historical Village and repaired.

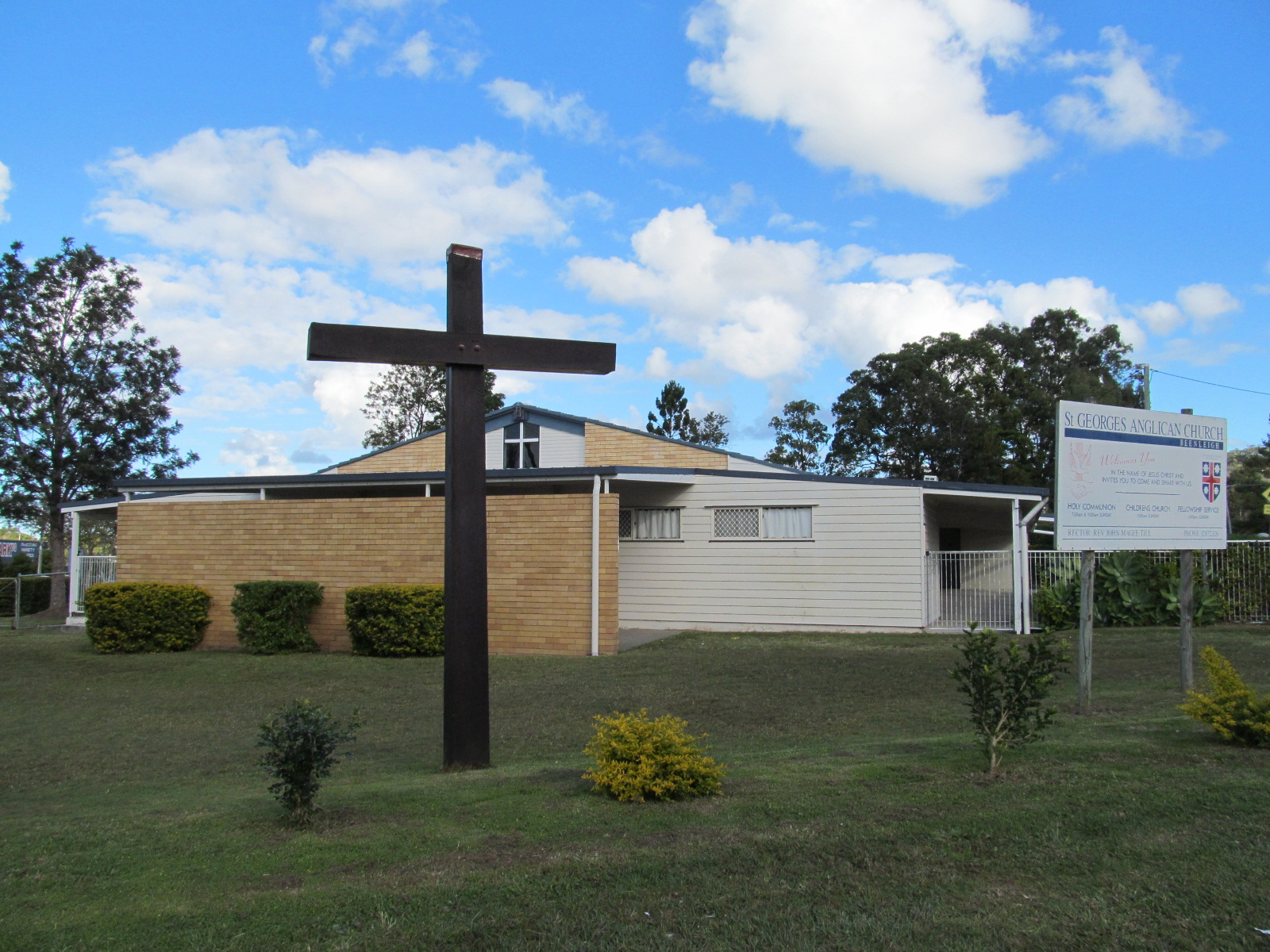
The current church, built 1964

== Description ==
This single-skin timber church is a one-storey building on low concrete stumps with steeply pitched galvanised corrugated iron gable roofs. It is now prominently located facing Main Street in the Beenleigh Historical Village.

The church is rectangular in plan with an attached chancel on the northern end. The chancel is narrower in width and has a lower roof than the nave. A gabled porch located on the western side is the only point of entry.

The walls consist of vertical jointed (VJ) boards fixed to an exposed stud frame that is decoratively patterned with cross bracing. Inclined timber members fixed above the bottom plate shed water away from the walls, protecting structural timbers. The raked soffits are lined with diagonal beaded timber boards that continue internally to form a raked ceiling.

The entry and front facade gable are decorated with curved and diagonal timber members. Four timber steps lead to the timber entry porch. Arched double doors constructed of diagonal timber boards open directly from the porch onto the main space of the church. This space is interrupted only by a screen enclosure in the south west corner. The chancel has a raised timber floor and is framed by a chancel arch.

The rafters are exposed below the diagonally boarded ceiling. Trusses are formed where timber tie beams are attached to the underside of four of the rafters and connected back to the walls by curved timber braces.

Tall slender casement windows are arranged in groups of three in the end walls and singularly in the side walls. A replica of the original timber bell tower is located in front of the church.

== Heritage listing ==
St George's Anglican Church was listed on the Queensland Heritage Register on 21 October 1992 having satisfied the following criteria.

The place is important in demonstrating the evolution or pattern of Queensland's history.

St George's Anglican Church is significant as the first church built in Beenleigh.

The place is important because of its aesthetic significance.

St George's Anglican Church is a fine example of a single-skin timber church demonstrating the decorative possibilities of this type of construction.

The place is important in demonstrating a high degree of creative or technical achievement at a particular period.

St George's Anglican Church is a fine example of a single-skin timber church demonstrating the decorative possibilities of this type of construction.

The place has a special association with the life or work of a particular person, group or organisation of importance in Queensland's history.

St George's Anglican Church is a surviving example of the ecclesiastical work of prominent architect FDG Stanley.
