= Edens Landing, Queensland =

Edens Landing
- Suburb
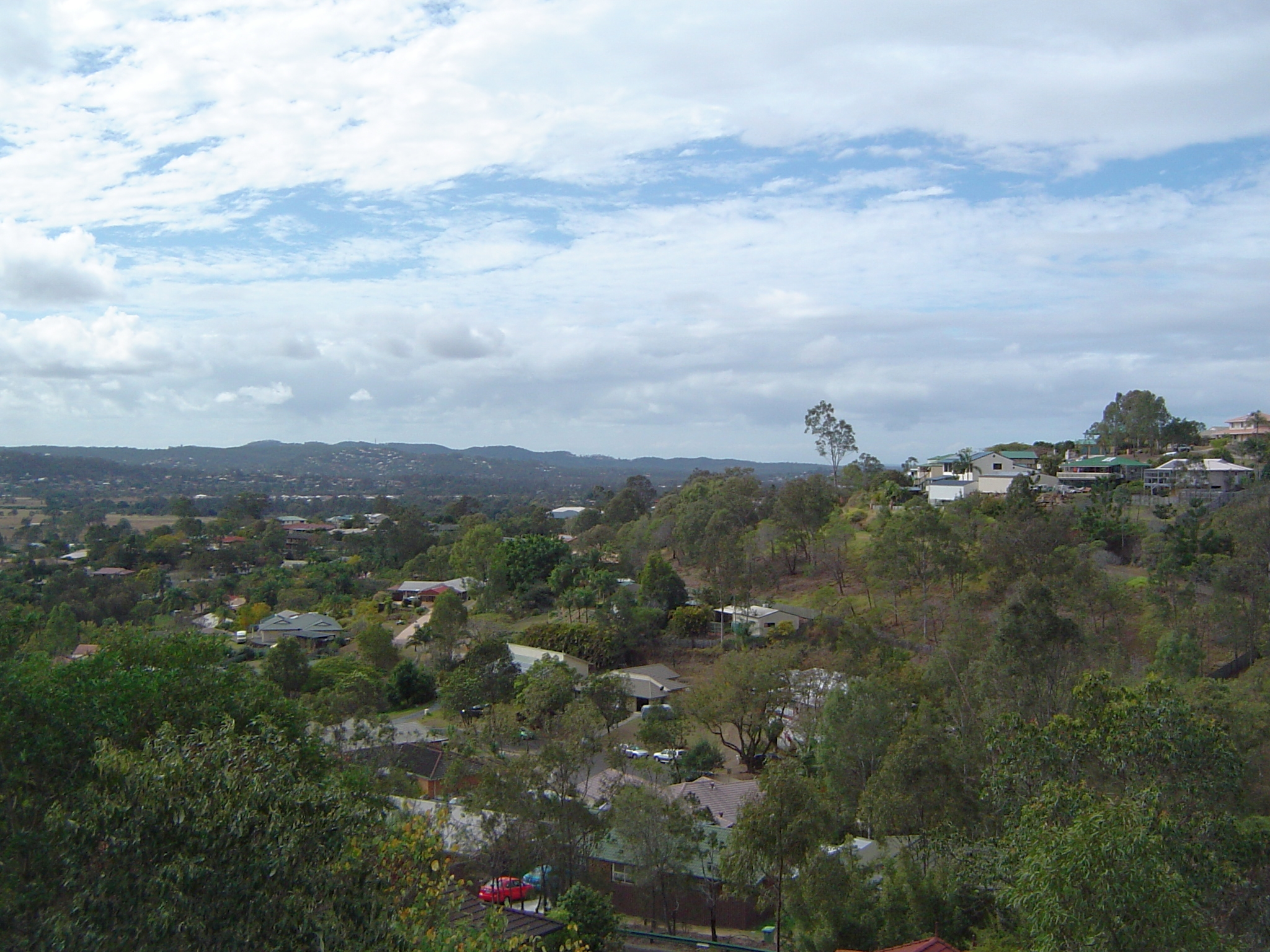
- Homes along an elevated ridge with other Logan City suburbs in the background, 2014

- Interactive map of Edens Landing
- Coordinates: 27.7030°S 153.1688°E
- Country: Australia
- State: Queensland
- LGA: Logan City
- Location: 11.9 km (7.4 mi) SE of Logan Central; 34.6 km (21.5 mi) SE of Brisbane CBD

Government
  - State electorate: Macalister
  - Federal division: Forde

Area
  - Total: 2.6 km^{2} (1.0 sq mi)

Population
  - Total: 5,094 (2021 census)
  - Density: 1,960/km^{2} (5,070/sq mi)
- Time zone: UTC+10:00 (AEST)
- Postcode: 4207
Suburbs around Edens Landing
Bethania	Bethania	Loganholme
Bethania	Edens Landing	Holmview
Waterford	Holmview	Holmview

Edens Landing is a suburb in the City of Logan, Queensland, Australia. In the 2021 census, Edens Landing had a population of 5,094 people.

== Geography ==
Located on the south side of the Logan River, 3 km north-west of Beenleigh and 30 km south-east of central Brisbane. The terrain ranges from 10 to 90 metres (33 to 295 ft) above sea level. The Logan River forms the north-east boundary of the locality, and the terrain is lowest nearest the river, rising towards the south-west. Logan River Road forms the western and south-western boundary of the locality.

The Beenleigh railway line (part of the Gold Coast railway line) enters the locality from the north-west (Bethania) and exits to the east (Holmview). The suburb is served by the Edens Landing railway station in the north of the suburb (27.6981°S 153.1709°E).

The land use is predominantly residential suburban housing, with houses being between 10 - 15 years old as of 2008.

== History ==
Henry Eden was an early resident in the Waterford area, being involved within the timber industry. In 1865, he successfully obtained permission to operate a ferry service on a punt across the Logan River.

In 1869, early settler Wilson Holliday built a small Wesleyan Methodist Church on his property, which was opened on Easter Sunday on 29 March 1869 by Reverend Issac Hardy. It was later relocated to Beenleigh.

The area remained rural for many decades, used primarily as an agricultural area and was known as Holmview Heights, until the late 20th century. The improvement of train services in the 1980s prompted Leighton Developers to fund the construction of a station at Edens Landing and the Place Names Board officially gazetted the name Edens Landing in November 1985.

The suburb was developed by Leighton Holdings throughout 1984 and 1985, being formed in 1985, however it was not named and bounded until February 1986.

Edens Landing Seventh-Day Adventist Church opened in 1990 in a brick building.

A rugby league club, the Edens Landing Dragons formed in 1993 with one open side playing in the Metropolitan Rugby League Competition. In 1994, the opens coach who had experience in establishing another Logan Rugby League Club was asked by Leighton Holdings whether a junior club would be feasible and a proposal was put to Logan Districts Juniors to join their competition in 1995 with junior sides. The club operated on Leighton fields. The club offered teams from under 7's to Opens but has since closed after around eleven seasons. It formally participated in a number of competitions in Brisbane.

Edens Landing State School opened on 28 January 1997.

In 2008, Edens Landing had a number of shops most of which were located on a small complex near Leighton Fields on Castile Crescent, including a childcare centre, medical centre, spa general shop, pharmacy, fish & chip shop, bakery, hairdresser, a sushi take-out store, and real estate agent.

== Demographics ==
In the 2011 census, Edens Landing recorded a population of 5,177 people, 50.8% female and 49.2% male. The median age of the Edens Landing population was 31 years, 7 years below the national median of 37. 70.5% of people living in Edens Landing were born in Australia. The other top responses for country of birth were New Zealand 8.7%, England 4.5%, Scotland 0.9%, Philippines 0.7%, and Afghanistan 0.5%. 86.6% of people spoke only English at home; the next most common languages were 0.8% Samoan, 0.6% Spanish, 0.4% Polish, 0.3% Japanese, and 0.3% German.

In the 2016 census, Edens Landing recorded a population of 5,094 people, 51.2% female and 48.8% male. The median age of the Edens Landing population was 33 years, 5 years below the national median of 38, with 69.8% of people living in Edens Landing were born in Australia. The other top responses for country of birth were New Zealand 8.7%, England 4.0%, Afghanistan 1.2%, Philippines 1.0%, South Africa 0.6%. 84.4% of people spoke only English at home; the next most common languages were 0.9% Samoan, 0.8% Dari, 0.6% Hazaraghi, 0.6% Filipino, and 0.5% Spanish.

In the 2021 census, Edens Landing recorded a population of 5,094 people, 50.7% female and 49.3% male. The median age of the Edens Landing population was 35 years, 3 years below the national median of 38, with 70.2% of people living in Edens Landing were born in Australia. The other top responses for country of birth were New Zealand 7.8%, England 3.7%, Afghanistan 1.6%, Philippines 1.3%, Scotland 0.6%. 82.7% of people spoke only English at home; the next most common languages were 1.8% Hazaraghi, 0.8% Samoan, 0.7% Mandarin, 0.7% Spanish, 0.5% and Filipino.

== Education ==
Edens Landing State School is a government primary (Prep–6) school for boys and girls at Jamie Nicolson Avenue (27.7053°S 153.1698°E). In 2023, the school had an enrolment of 752 students, with 56 teachers (51.7 full-time equivalent) and 31 non-teaching staff (22.3 full-time equivalent). It includes a special education program.

There is no secondary school in Edens Landing. The nearest government secondary school is Loganlea State High School in Loganlea to the north-west.

== Transport ==
Edens Landing is serviced by the Logan City bus company with bus 562 making stops along the main street of Castile Crescent. This bus service connects at the Loganholme bus station and interchange (located adjacent to the Logan Hyperdome shopping centre) with a variety of bus services to the Brisbane CBD. Edens Landing also has a railway station that is part of the Beenleigh railway line.

== Religion ==
Despite the name, the Edens Landing Seventh-Day Adventist Church is in neighbouring Holmview.

== Notable residents ==
- Warren Lawton, Paralympic athlete
