= Steiglitz, Queensland =

Steiglitz
- Town
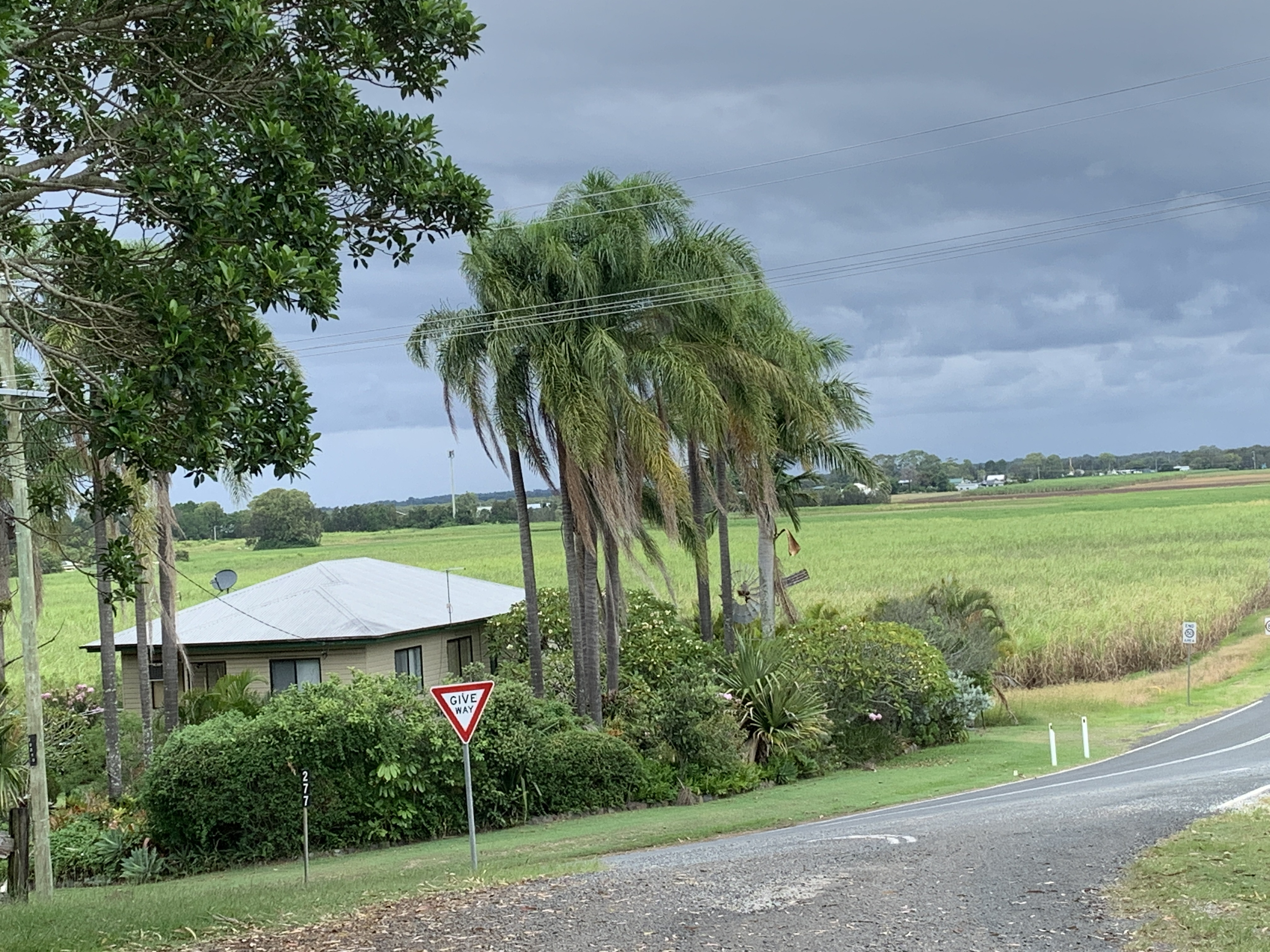
- Looking south down Cabbage Tree Point Road over houses and cane fields across Steiglitz with a storm approaching, January 2022

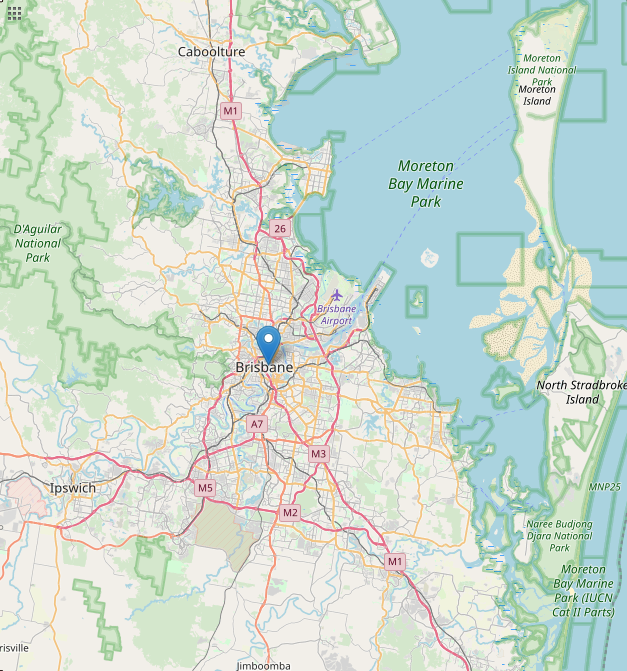
- Interactive map of Steiglitz
- Coordinates: 27.7441°S 153.3533°E
- Country: Australia
- State: Queensland
- City: Gold Coast
- LGA: City of Gold Coast
- Location: 12.2 km (7.6 mi) NE of Ormeau; 40.4 km (25.1 mi) N of Southport; 41.4 km (25.7 mi) N of Surfers Paradise; 53.5 km (33.2 mi) SE of Brisbane CBD

Government
  - State electorate: Coomera
  - Federal division: Fadden

Area
  - Total: 11.4 km^{2} (4.4 sq mi)

Population
  - Total: 682 (2021 census)
  - Density: 59.82/km^{2} (154.9/sq mi)
- Time zone: UTC+10:00 (AEST)
- Postcode: 4207
Localities around Steiglitz
Woongoolba	Woongoolba	Southern Moreton Bay Islands
Woongoolba	Steiglitz	Southern Moreton Bay Islands
Norwell	Jacobs Well	Southern Moreton Bay Islands

Steiglitz is a rural coastal town and locality in the City of Gold Coast, Queensland, Australia. In the 2021 census, the locality of Steiglitz had a population of 682 people.

== Geography ==
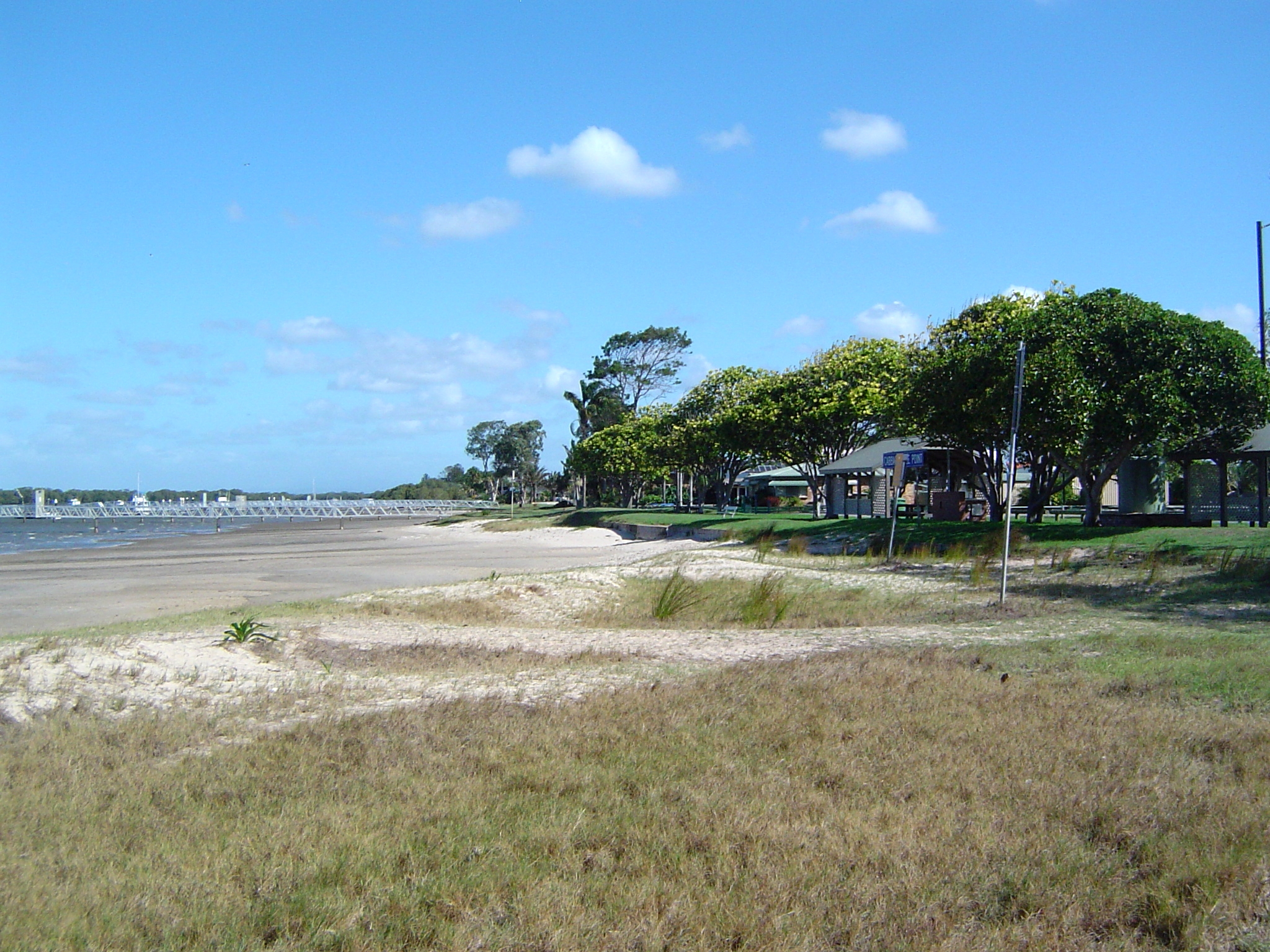
Foreshore and Tipplers Passage at Cabbage Tree Point, 2014

Steiglitz is bounded to the east by Moreton Bay, to the south by Jacobs Well, to the west and north by Woongoolba.

Cabbage Tree Point is a headland jutting into Moreton Bay (27.7344°S 153.3580°E).

The town of Steiglitz is located at Cabbage Tree Point and the town is often referred to as Cabbage Tree Point. The name refers to the cabbage tree palms that grew in the area.

== History ==
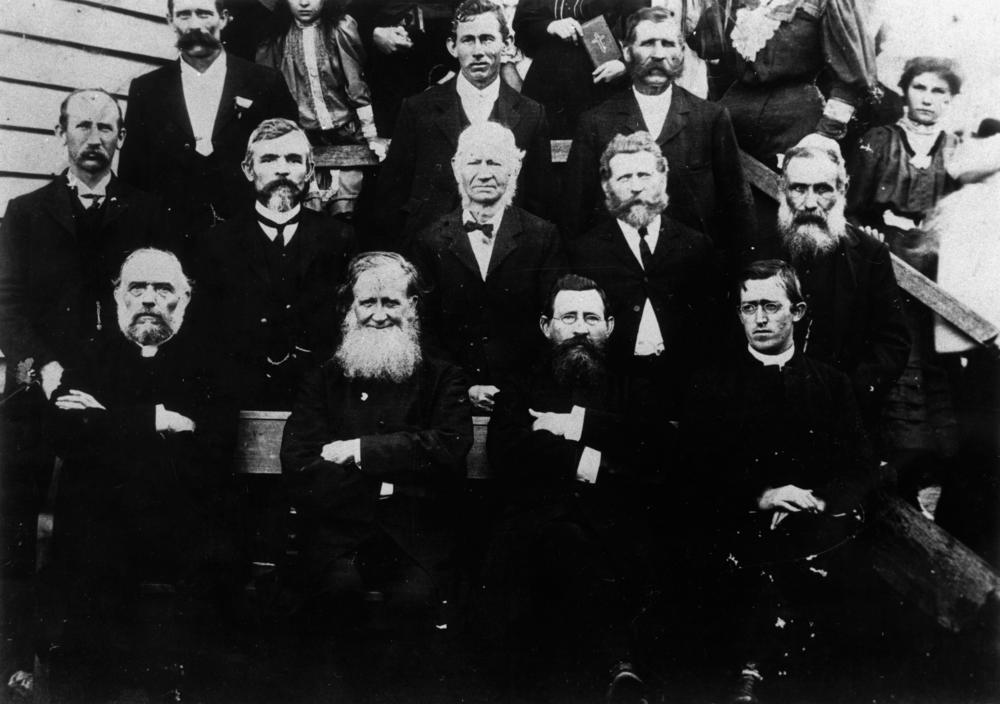
Bethlehem Lutheran Church gathering, Pimpama Island (Carl Heinrich Heck is centre of the middle row)

The district is named after Stegelitz, Germany, the home town of the pioneer family Kleinschmidt.

In the late 1800s, the farming district located between the Pimpama River and the Logan River called Pimpama Island and encompasses the modern localities of Jacobs Well, Norwell, Steiglitz and Woongoolba. It was referred to as an island because there were a number of lagoons and swamps that isolated the area during the wet season; however, this disadvantage made it good land for growing sugar cane.

German immigrant families settled in the area in the 1870s. Lutheran services were held in private homes until the first church was erected in 1882, being replaced by the present church in 1908. The church was renovated in 1930.

The Rocky Point Sugar Mill was established by Carl Heinrich Heck in 1878 on Mill Road (and crosses the boundary between Woongoolba and Steiglitz). Despite being one of the oldest sugar mills in Australia, it is still privately owned by the Heck Group, a family company of five generations. There were once other sugar mills in the area, but they have now closed and Rocky Point has expanded to replace their lost capacity.

On 16 August 1924, the Rocky Point Sugar Mill tramway was officially opened by John Appel, the Member of the Queensland Legislative Assembly for Albert. It went from the mill to Norwell to assist with transporting the harvested sugarcane to the mill, a task made difficult by the low-lying swampy land in the area. The tramway was mostly built along the roadside (the roads having been built on the higher ground whenever possible) but it was still necessary to build a few hundred yards of causeway to cross the swamp (now drained) along New Norwell Road (approx 27.7562°S 153.3086°E). The tramway was a 2 ft (610 mm) gauge and the steam locomotive that operated on it was from John Fowler & Co. in England. The locomotive was delivered to the wharf at Steiglitz and then carried on a large horse-drawn wagon to get to the mill. There were 100 cane wagons to carry the cane; these came from the closed sugar mill at Nerang. Although there were hopes from local people that the tramway would be extended to connect to the South Coast railway line at Ormeau and to the Steiglitz wharf onto Moreton Bay, as a form of public transport, neither of these extensions were built and passengers were not carried. The tramway was only extended to better access the sugarcane-growing areas in Norwell. Frequent flooding of the tramway was the cause of many derailments and there was difficulty maintaining the line during World War II, increasing the frequency of derailments. With the increasing availability of motorised transport after World War II, the tramway was closed in 1951. However, the rails and wagons were still used to move sugarcane around the mill, although the locomotive had been sold. The locomotive was used as a static display in a number of locations including Gilltraps Auto Museum at Kirra and the Dreamworld theme park before returning to the mill as part of a vision to create a historical precinct, which never eventuated, so it was donated in 2013 to the Beenleigh Historical Village.

In 2001–2, a co-generation plant was added at Rocky Point Sugar Mill.

== Demographics ==
In the 2011 census, the locality of Steiglitz had a population of 441 people.

In the 2016 census, the locality of Steiglitz had a population of 705 people.

In the 2021 census, the locality of Steiglitz had a population of 682 people.

== Economy ==
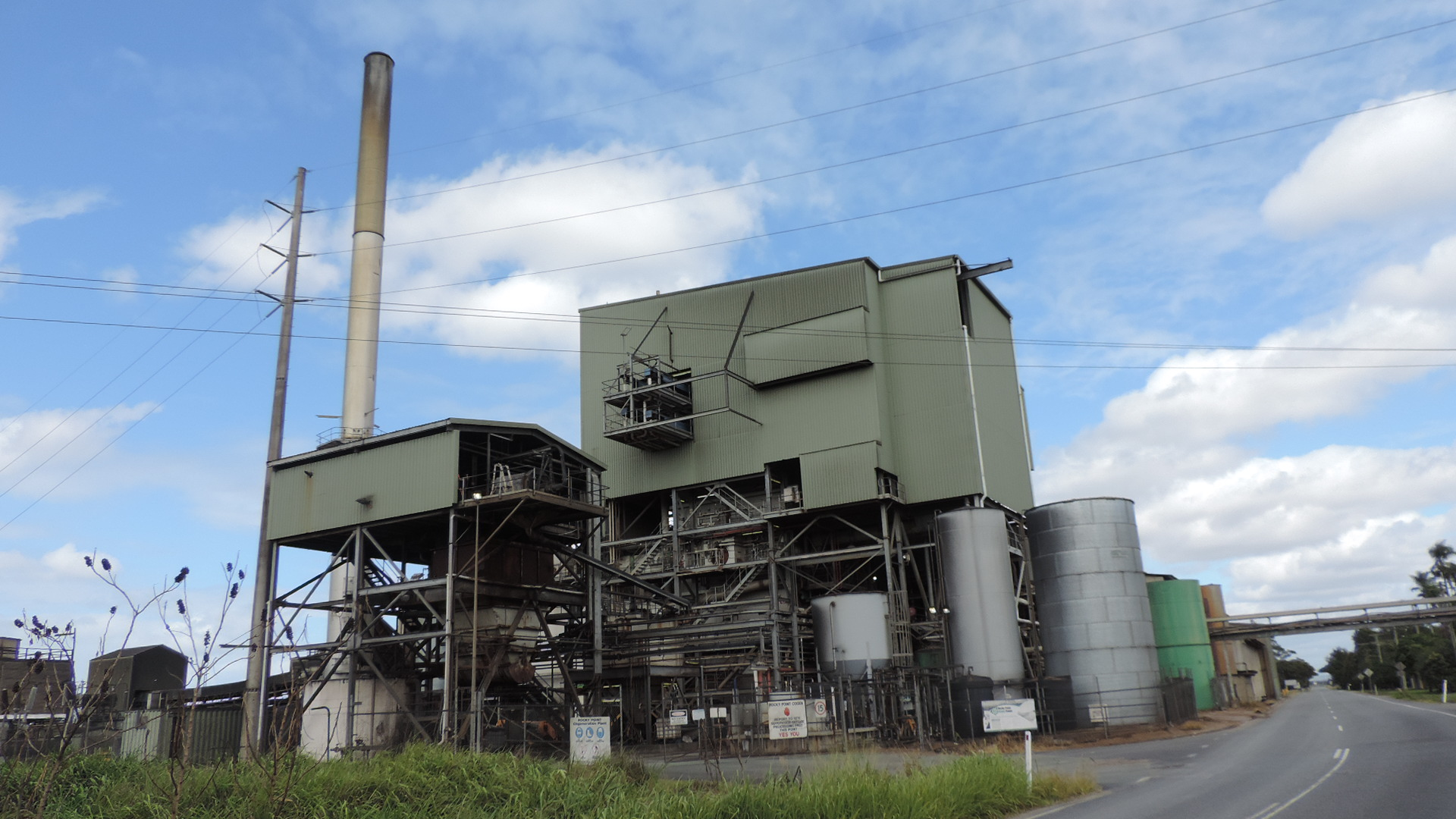
Rocky Point Sugar Mill, Woongoolba and Steiglitz, 2014

Rocky Point Sugar Mill is a sugar mill at 102-120 Mill Road (27.7338°S 153.3272°E), extending across the road into neighbouring Woongoolba. The mill's co-generation plant produces almost 200GWh of electricity per annum from renewable sources, which can be used in the mill and/or exported, making Rocky Point one of the most energy-efficient sugar mills in Australia.

== Education ==
There are no schools in Steiglitz. The nearest government primary school is Woongoolba State School in neighbouring Woongoolba to the west. The nearest government secondary school is Ormeau Woods State High School in Ormeau to the south-west.

== Amenities ==
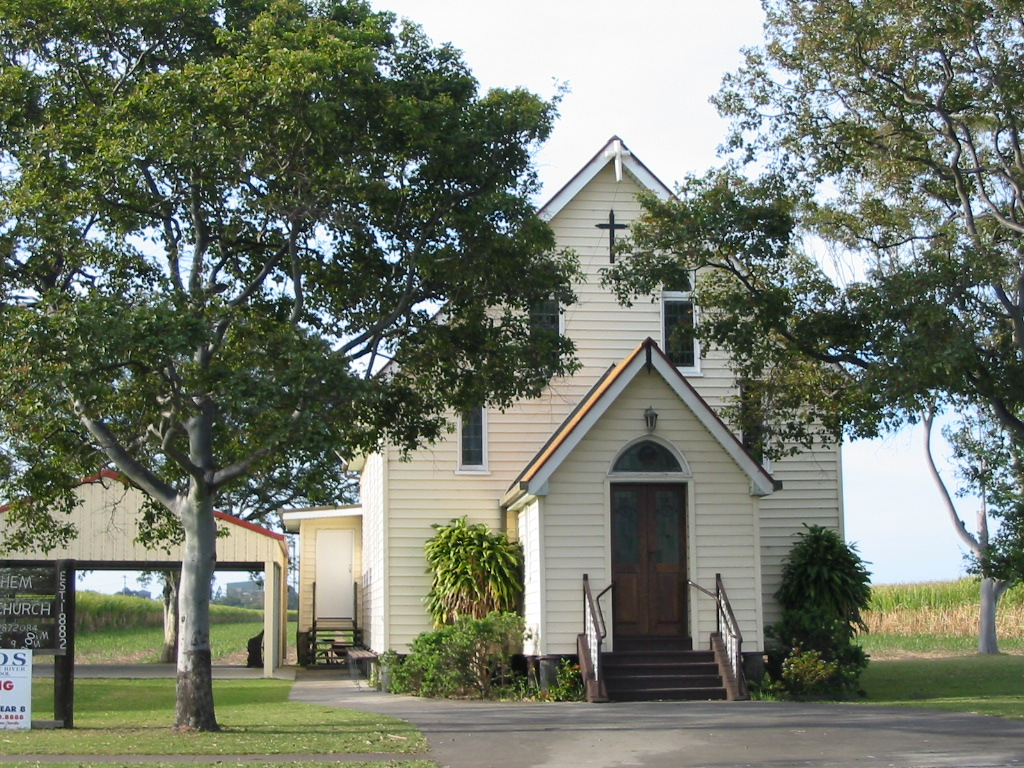
Bethlehem Lutheran Church, 2005

Bethlehem Lutheran Church is at 1281 Stapylton Jacobs Well Road (27.7459°S 153.3258°E). Bethlehem Preschool and Kindergarten is immediately adjacent at 1279 Stapylton Jacobs Well Road (27.7459°S 153.3252°E).

Woongoolba Bowls Club is a sports and community club at 324 Cabbage Tree Point Road (27.7346°S 153.3550°E). The Gold Coast City Council operates a fortnightly mobile library service which visits the Bowls Club on Cabbage Tree Point Road.

Horizon Shores Marina is a 27.3-hectare (67-acre) marina at 80 Cabbage Tree Point Road (27.7539°S 153.3474°E).

Rudy Maas Marina is a 1.1-hectare (2.7-acre) marina at 82 Cabbage Tree Point Road (27.7507°S 153.3503°E).

There is a boat ramp at Charlie Hammel Park at the far end of Cabbage Tree Point Road (27.7349°S 153.3587°E). It is managed by the Gold Coast City Council.

There are a number of parks in the area, including:

- Behm Creek Reserve (27.7576°S 153.3483°E)
- Cabbage Tree Point Conservation Park (27.7259°S 153.3518°E)
- Charlie Hammel Park (27.7352°S 153.3576°E)
- Floodgate Area (27.7266°S 153.3480°E)
- Lake Royal Palms Park (27.7361°S 153.3538°E)
- Rocky Point Reserve (27.7158°S 153.3428°E)
- Short Cut Road Reserve (27.7444°S 153.3340°E)
- Sugar Mill Reserve (27.7352°S 153.3374°E)
