= Edens Landing State School =

Primary school in Edens Landing, Australia

- School Logo

Location
- Jamie Nicolson Avenue, Edens Landing, Queensland, Australia; 27.7056°S 153.1703°E

Information
- School type: Public, co-educational
- Motto: Soar to Success
- Established: 1997
- Principal: Megan Hill
- Grades: Prep – Year 6
- Enrollment: 752 (2023)
- Colors: Turquoise; Blue
- Website: Official website

Edens Landing State School is a public co-educational primary school, located in the Logan City suburb of Edens Landing, Queensland, Australia. It is administered by the Queensland Department of Education, with an enrolment of 752 students and a teaching staff of 56, as of 2023. The school serves students from Prep to Year 6, and is located on Jamie Nicolson Avenue and along the main road of Edens Landing, Castile Crescent.

== History ==
The school was proposed in 1991 by the Department of Education, with the site being chosen in 1993.

It opened on 28 January 1997, with the 20th anniversary celebration occurring on 23 June 2017. The celebration included the performance of a traditional bush dance and line dancing with live country music, as well as traditional country food. The bush dance was well received and became an annual school event.

In November 2017, the school participated in the Day for Daniel walk for the first time to pay tribute to Daniel Morcombe.

A peace pole was erected at the school in 2023 as part of a global project, it is one of 250,000 poles erected as part of the project.

== Demographics ==
In 2023, the school had a student enrollment of 752 with 56 teachers (51 full-time equivalent) and 31 non-teaching staff (22 full-time equivalent). Female enrollments consisted of 370 students and Male enrollments consisted of 382 students; Indigenous enrollments accounted for a total of 10% of total enrollments and 21% of students had a language background other than English.

== See also ==
- Education in Queensland
- List of schools in Greater Brisbane
