= Phil Stockman =

Australian baseball player (born 1980)

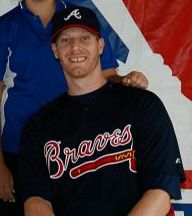
- Stockman in 2006
- Relief pitcher
- Born: 25 January 1980 (age 46); Oldham, Greater Manchester, England
- Batted: Right Threw: Right

MLB debut
- 15 June, 2006, for the Atlanta Braves

Last MLB appearance
- 11 June, 2008, for the Atlanta Braves

MLB statistics
- Win–loss record: 0–0
- Earned run average: 0.79
- Strikeouts: 13
- Stats at Baseball Reference

Teams
- Atlanta Braves (2006, 2008)

Olympic medal record

Men's Baseball
Silver medal – second place	2004 Athens	Team competition

Phillip Matthew Stockman (born 25 January 1980) is an English born Australian former pitcher in Major League Baseball.

== Amateur career ==
Although Stockman was born in England, he grew up in Australia and is a graduate of Beenleigh State High School in Brisbane, Australia, and he has represented that country as a member of Australia's national baseball team. While with the team, Stockman won a silver medal at the 2004 Summer Olympics, and he was also a participant in the 2006 World Baseball Classic.

== Professional career ==
Originally signed by the Arizona Diamondbacks organization, Stockman was a Texas League All-Star in 2003, while working as a starting pitcher for the El Paso Diablos. He signed with the Braves as a six-year minor league free agent in 2006, and earned a midseason promotion to the majors. His contract was purchased from the Richmond Braves on 14 June 2008 in place of RHP Chris Reitsma, who was placed on the 15-day disabled list. He made his debut the next day. On 16 May 2008 Stockman was called up to the major leagues and pitched 1 scoreless inning of relief against Oakland on 17 May, which included his first two career strikeouts (which were Mark Loretta and Josh Beckett.)

He was released on 15 March 2009 due to injuries.

=== Brisbane Bandits ===
In the inaugural 2010–11 Australian Baseball League season, Stockman played for the Brisbane Bandits, becoming the first former Major League player to play for them. He finished his Australian Baseball League career that season earning a 2.45 ERA in 10 games, with a miserly .067 batting average against him.

Stockman has been part of the team's coaching staff since the 2014–15 Australian Baseball League season.
