= St Joseph's Tobruk Memorial School =

Primary school in Queensland, Australia

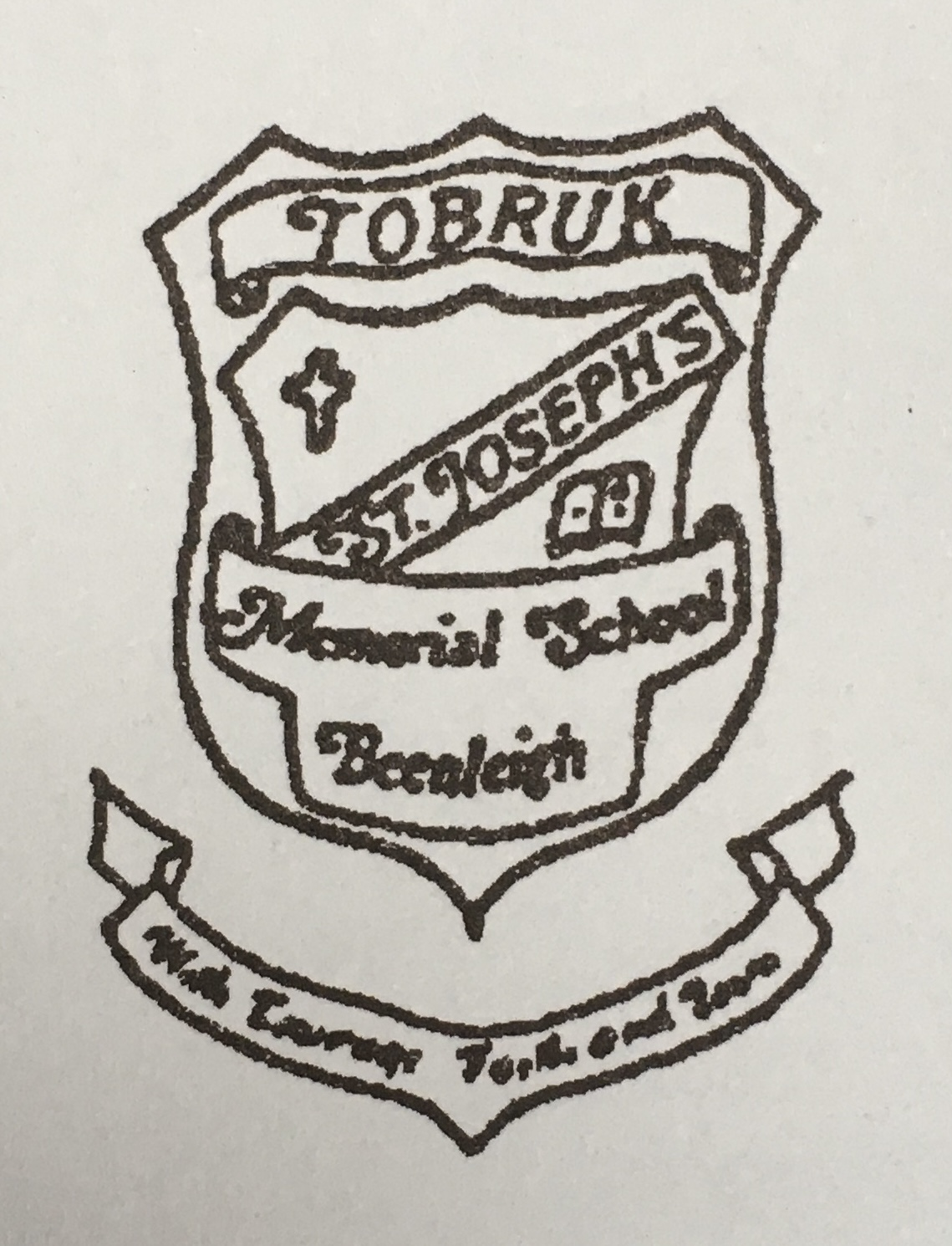
- Original school crest

Location
- 53 Kokoda Street, Beenleigh, Queensland, Australia; 27.71245°S 153.20042°E

Information
- School type: Private
- Motto: Courage, Faith and Love
- Religious affiliation: Sisters of St Joseph of the Sacred Heart
- Established: 1953
- Principal: Kevin Billion
- Grades: Prep – Year 6
- Enrollment: 448 (2023)
- Website: Official site

St Joseph's Tobruk Memorial School, also commonly known as St Joseph's or simply Joey's, is an independent, Roman Catholic, co-educational primary school, located in the town of Beenleigh in the City of Logan, Queensland, Australia. It is administered by Brisbane Catholic Education (BCE) and is a member school of the Queensland Catholic Education Commission, with an enrolment of 448 students and a teaching staff of 32, as of 2023. The school serves students from Prep to Year 6.

== History ==
The school was announced in May 1951, under the name St Joseph's Convent and was to be an all-boys school. The permit was granted in June 1951, and the foundation stone was laid on 16 March 1952. Despite the weather on 16 March, many still attended the laying of the foundation stone.

Originally budgeted at £20,000 in 1951, the final cost of the school ranged between £26,000 and £27,000 by the school's opening in 1953. The school opened on 25 October 1953, to honour those who served in the Siege of Tobruk during World War II. Despite originally being planned as an all-boys school, it opened as a coeducational facility for day school, but only accommodated boys for boarding school. It had 97 foundation students.

The school was blessed by Archbishop Duhig, with Leslie Morshead and 55 members of the Rats of Tobruk Association attending. In July 1955, the only replica of the Australian memorial in Tobruk was unveiled at the school, with approximately 300 members of the Rats of Tobruk Association present, and Archbishop Duhig unveiling the memorial.

1998 saw the school celebrate its past by inviting the project team for the Rats of Tobruk to plant rose bushes in remembrance. A rose garden featuring a memorial with 18 rosebushes was created.

On 21 October 2006 the school was deliberately set ablaze, and was severely damaged. The cost of the repairs was more than $500,000; being the second incident in the last 10 years (since 1996), the first fire caused roughly $60,000 in damage. A number of surviving soldiers from Tobruk were involved in the school's rebuilding efforts, assisting with the RSL sponsored fundraiser for the school.

The 60th anniversary was celebrated on 25 October 2013, with a Thanksgiving Mass and a 1950s dinner dance being held as the main events.

The students wore yellow clothing on 1 August 2014 to support the Wear Yellow for Allison Day movement to remember Allison Baden-Clay, after an 11-year-old suggested the idea to the school council.

In January 2024, the school's playground was replaced.

== Demographics ==
In 2023, the school had a student enrollment of 448 with 32 teachers (30.2 full-time equivalent) and 21 non-teaching staff (14.4 full-time equivalent). Female enrollments consisted of 225 students and Male enrollments consisted of 223 students; Indigenous enrollments accounted for a total of 7% and 10% of students had a language background other than English.

== See also ==
- List of Schools in Greater Brisbane
