= Tori Groves-Little =

Australian rules footballer (born 2000)

Personal information
- Born: 13 October 2000 (age 26)
- Original team: Coorparoo (QWAFL)
- Draft: No. 56, 2018 AFL Women's draft
- Debut: Round 2, 2019, Brisbane vs. Fremantle, at Fremantle Oval
- Height: 167 cm (5 ft 6 in)
- Position: Wing/Half-back

Playing career^{1}
| Years | Club | Games (Goals) |
| 2019 | Brisbane | 2 (0) |
| 2020–2022 (S7) | Gold Coast | 11 (4) |
| Total | | 13 (4) |
- ^{1} Playing statistics correct to the end of 2022 (S7).

Tori Groves-Little (born 13 October 2000) is an Australian rules footballer who played for Brisbane and for Gold Coast in the AFL Women's competition (AFLW). Following their AFLW career Groves-Little switched to rugby league, playing for Souths Logan Magpies in the Queensland Women's Rugby League.

== Early life ==
Groves-Little grew up in Logan, Queensland and attended Beenleigh State High School throughout their teenage years. They played junior football for the Beenleigh Buffaloes in the local Queensland competition in their younger years. They joined the Gold Coast Suns Academy program at the age of 16 and became the youngest player to win the QWAFL best and fairest award at the age of 17. Later that year they were drafted by Brisbane with the 56th pick in the 2018 AFL Women's draft.

Groves-Little is non-binary and uses they/them pronouns.

== AFLW career ==
Groves-Little made their AFLW debut in Brisbane's round 2 game against Fremantle at Fremantle Oval on 10 February 2019. Following the 2019 season, they joined Gold Coast. In March 2023, Groves-Little was delisted by Gold Coast.

== Statistics ==
Legend
| G | Goals | K | Kicks | D | Disposals | T | Tackles |
| B | Behinds | H | Handballs | M | Marks |

| Season | Team | No. | Games | Totals | | | | | | | Averages (per game) | | | | | | | Votes |
| Season | Team | No. | Games | G | B | K | H | D | M | T | G | B | K | H | D | M | T | Votes |
|---|---|---|---|---|---|---|---|---|---|---|---|---|---|---|---|---|---|---|
| 2019 | Brisbane | 26 | 2 | 0 | 1 | 10 | 2 | 12 | 1 | 8 | 0.0 | 0.5 | 5.0 | 1.0 | 6.0 | 0.5 | 4.0 | 0 |
| 2020 | Gold Coast | 3 | 1 | 0 | 0 | 4 | 1 | 5 | 0 | 1 | 0.0 | 0.0 | 4.0 | 1.0 | 5.0 | 0.0 | 1.0 | 0 |
| 2021 | Gold Coast | 3 | 3 | 0 | 0 | 16 | 11 | 27 | 7 | 12 | 0.0 | 0.0 | 5.3 | 3.7 | 9.0 | 2.3 | 4.0 | 0 |
| 2022 (S6) | Gold Coast | 3 | 5 | 4 | 5 | 23 | 4 | 27 | 5 | 11 | 0.8 | 1.0 | 4.6 | 0.8 | 5.4 | 1.0 | 2.2 | 0 |
| 2022 (S7) | Gold Coast | 3 | 2 | 0 | 0 | 7 | 3 | 10 | 0 | 10 | 0.0 | 0.0 | 3.5 | 1.5 | 5.0 | 0.0 | 5.0 | 0 |
| Career | | | 13 | 4 | 6 | 60 | 21 | 81 | 13 | 42 | 0.3 | 0.5 | 4.6 | 1.6 | 6.2 | 1.0 | 3.2 | 0 |
