= Beenleigh State High School =

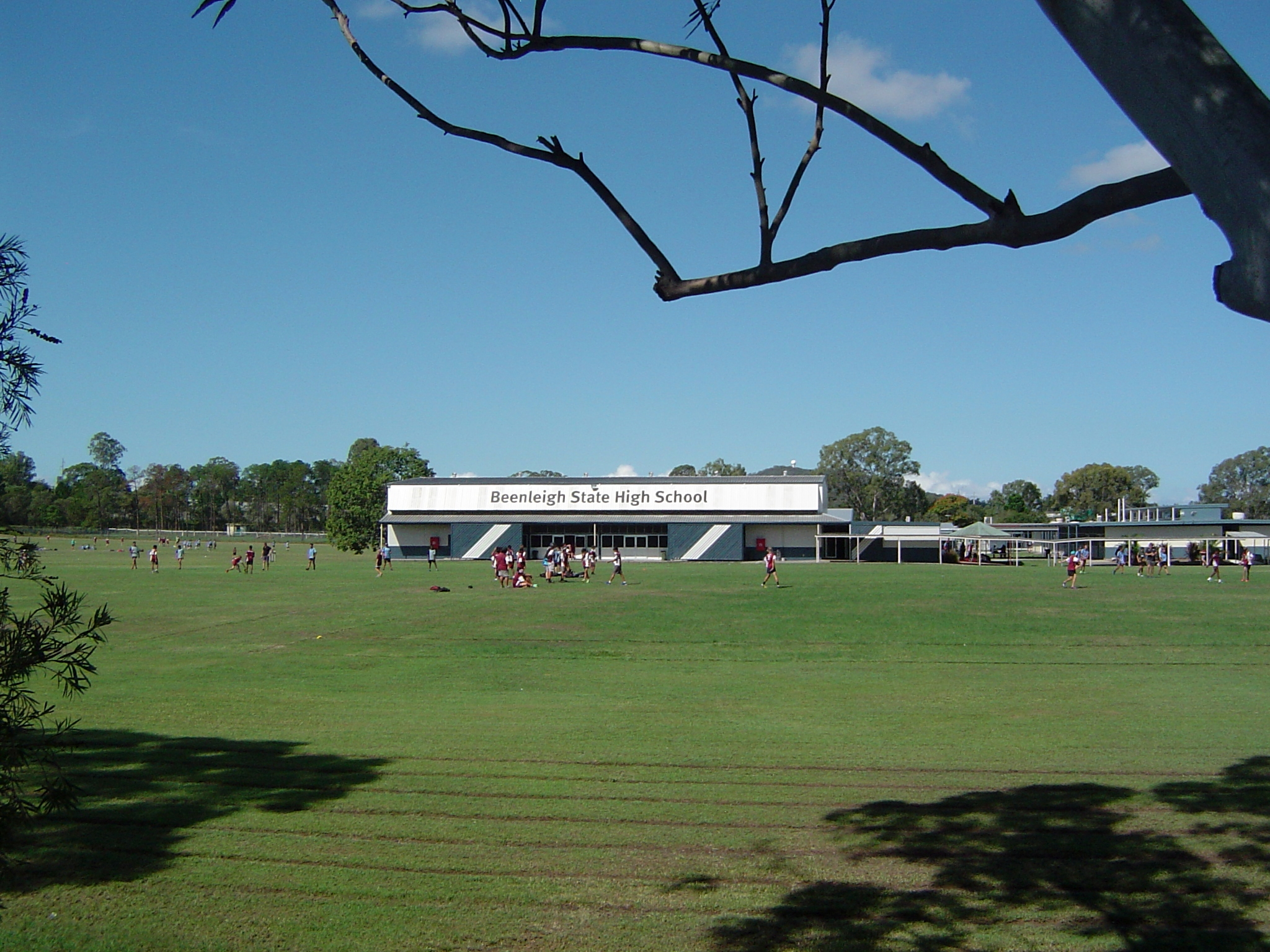
- Sports oval and school buildings

Location
- Logan, Queensland; Australia; 27°42′43″S 153°12′15″E

Information
- Type: Public, selective, co-educational, secondary, day school
- Motto: Latin: Semper Altiora (Reach Higher)
- Established: 1963
- Principal: Matthew Morgan
- Enrolment: 1,977 (2023)
- Campus: Urban (Beenleigh)
- Website: Official site

Beenleigh State High School (BSHS) is a public co-educational secondary school located in the Logan City suburb of Beenleigh, Queensland, Australia. It is administered by the Queensland Department of Education, with an enrolment of 1,977 students and a teaching staff of 136, as of 2023. The school serves students from Year 7 to Year 12.

== History ==
The school opened on the 29 January 1963.

In the 2017 floods, the school's agricultural program was severely set back, however, the school was not damaged by the floods.

== Demographics ==
In 2023, the school had a student enrolment of 1,977 with 136 teachers (131.9 full-time equivalent) and 113 non-teaching staff (84.6 full-time equivalent). Female enrolments consisted of 1,032 students and Male enrolments consisted of 945 students; Indigenous enrolments accounted for a total of 12% and 17% of students had a language background other than English.

== Notable alumni ==
- Alan Cann, rugby league player
- Tonie Carroll, rugby league player with the Brisbane Broncos.
- Tori Groves-Little, Australian rules footballer with the Gold Coast Suns.
- Sonia Kruger, actress, dancer, media personality
- Phil Stockman, baseball player

== See also ==
- Education in Queensland
- List of schools in Greater Brisbane
