= Electoral results for the district of Springwood =

Queensland, Australia, district election results

This is a list of electoral results for the electoral district of Springwood in Queensland state elections.

== Members for Springwood ==
Member	Party	Term
Huan Fraser	National	1986–1989
Molly Robson	Labor	1989–1995
Luke Woolmer	Liberal	1995–1998
Grant Musgrove	Labor	1998–2000
Grant Musgrove	Independent	2000–2001
Barbara Stone	Labor	2001–2012
John Grant	Liberal National	2012–2015
Mick de Brenni	Labor	2015–present

== Election results ==
=== Elections in the 2020s ===
2024 Queensland state election: Springwood
Party	Candidate	Votes	%	±%
Labor	Mick de Brenni	13,184	41.19	−7.61
Liberal National	Susanna Damianopoulos	12,348	38.58	+4.08
Greens	Benjamin Harry	2,701	8.44	+0.94
One Nation	Glen Cookson	2,201	6.88	+1.48
Family First	Gabrielle Davis	1,114	3.48	+3.48
Independent	Karley Saidy-Hennessey	458	1.43	+1.43
Total formal votes		32,006	96.30	
Informal votes		1,230	3.70	
Turnout		33,236	90.33	
Two-party-preferred result
Labor	Mick de Brenni	16,677	52.11	−6.19
Liberal National	Susanna Damianopoulos	15,329	47.89	+6.19
Labor hold		Swing	-6.19	

2020 Queensland state election: Springwood
Party	Candidate	Votes	%	±%
Labor	Mick de Brenni	15,066	48.79	+4.62
Liberal National	Kirrily Boulton	10,646	34.47	−5.80
Greens	Janina Leo	2,331	7.55	−1.50
One Nation	Glen Cookson	1,658	5.37	+5.37
Animal Justice	Judy Rush	686	2.22	+2.22
Civil Liberties & Motorists	Ian Sganzerla	261	0.85	−5.67
United Australia	George Sokolov	234	0.76	+0.76
Total formal votes		30,882	96.61	+1.33
Informal votes		1,083	3.39	−1.33
Turnout		31,965	90.36	+0.95
Two-party-preferred result
Labor	Mick de Brenni	18,005	58.30	+4.71
Liberal National	Kirrily Boulton	12,877	41.70	−4.71
Labor hold		Swing	+4.71	

=== Elections in the 2010s ===
2017 Queensland state election: Springwood
Party	Candidate	Votes	%	±%
Labor	Mick de Brenni	13,289	44.2	+3.8
Liberal National	Julie Talty	12,117	40.3	−2.1
Greens	Neil Cotter	2,721	9.0	+0.4
Consumer Rights	John Taylor	1,961	6.5	+6.5
Total formal votes		30,088	95.3	−2.8
Informal votes		1,490	4.7	+2.8
Turnout		31,578	89.4	+0.7
Two-party-preferred result
Labor	Mick de Brenni	16,125	53.6	+2.2
Liberal National	Julie Talty	13,963	46.4	−2.2
Labor hold		Swing	+2.2	

2015 Queensland state election: Springwood
Party	Candidate	Votes	%	±%
Liberal National	John Grant	12,547	42.08	−13.58
Labor	Mick de Brenni	12,260	41.12	+13.13
Greens	Janina Leo	2,595	8.70	+2.03
Palmer United	Peter Chamberlain	1,504	5.04	+5.04
Family First	Chris Lawrie	908	3.05	+0.09
Total formal votes		29,814	98.13	+0.27
Informal votes		567	1.87	−0.27
Turnout		30,381	90.97	−0.38
Two-party-preferred result
Labor	Mick de Brenni	14,661	51.73	+17.12
Liberal National	John Grant	13,678	48.27	−17.12
Labor gain from Liberal National		Swing	+17.12	

2012 Queensland state election: Springwood
Party	Candidate	Votes	%	±%
Liberal National	John Grant	15,939	55.67	+15.46
Labor	Barbara Stone	8,016	28.00	−18.95
Katter's Australian	Julian Tocaciu	1,923	6.72	+6.72
Greens	Neil Cotter	1,910	6.67	−0.57
Family First	Chris Lawrie	845	2.95	+2.95
Total formal votes		28,633	97.86	−0.08
Informal votes		625	2.14	+0.08
Turnout		29,258	91.35	−0.50
Two-party-preferred result
Liberal National	John Grant	17,256	65.39	+19.47
Labor	Barbara Stone	9,132	34.61	−19.47
Liberal National gain from Labor		Swing	+19.47	

=== Elections in the 2000s ===
2009 Queensland state election: Springwood
Party	Candidate	Votes	%	±%
Labor	Barbara Stone	13,536	46.9	−2.5
Liberal National	Dave Beard	11,594	40.2	+1.7
Greens	Neil Cotter	2,088	7.2	+0.9
Independent	Allan de Brenni	1,081	3.7	+3.7
Independent	Lesley Noah	334	1.2	−3.6
Independent	Kim Limburg	199	0.7	+0.7
Total formal votes		28,832	97.8	
Informal votes		605	2.2	
Turnout		29,437	91.9	
Two-party-preferred result
Labor	Barbara Stone	14,518	54.1	−1.6
Liberal National	Dave Beard	12,326	45.9	+1.6
Labor hold		Swing	−1.6	

2006 Queensland state election: Springwood
Party	Candidate	Votes	%	±%
Labor	Barbara Stone	11,845	49.2	−5.7
Liberal	Peter Collins	9,434	39.2	+39.2
Greens	Neil Cotter	1,492	6.2	−2.1
Independent	Lesley Noah	1,315	5.5	+5.5
Total formal votes		24,086	97.9	−0.0
Informal votes		516	2.1	+0.0
Turnout		24,602	90.8	−1.3
Two-party-preferred result
Labor	Barbara Stone	12,711	55.2	−4.5
Liberal	Peter Collins	10,328	44.8	+44.8
Labor hold		Swing	−4.5	

2004 Queensland state election: Springwood
Party	Candidate	Votes	%	±%
Labor	Barbara Stone	13,288	54.9	+9.3
National	Andrea Ross	8,930	36.9	+18.1
Greens	John Reddington	2,000	8.3	+8.3
Total formal votes		24,218	97.9	+0.4
Informal votes		515	2.1	−0.4
Turnout		24,733	92.1	−0.6
Two-party-preferred result
Labor	Barbara Stone	13,909	59.7	−0.7
National	Andrea Ross	9,381	40.3	+0.7
Labor hold		Swing	−0.7	

2001 Queensland state election: Springwood
Party	Candidate	Votes	%	±%
Labor	Barbara Stone	11,192	45.6	+7.4
Independent	Hetty Johnston	5,140	20.9	+20.9
National	Darren Power	4,613	18.8	+8.4
Liberal	Bob Ward	3,590	14.6	−9.5
Total formal votes		24,535	97.5	
Informal votes		624	2.5	
Turnout		25,159	92.7	
Two-party-preferred result
Labor	Barbara Stone	12,442	60.4	+10.7
National	Darren Power	8,169	39.6	+39.6
Labor gain from Liberal		Swing	+10.7	

=== Elections in the 1990s ===
1998 Queensland state election: Springwood
Party	Candidate	Votes	%	±%
Labor	Grant Musgrove	7,047	38.2	+6.5
Liberal	Luke Woolmer	6,270	34.0	−3.9
One Nation	Neil Pitt	3,691	20.0	+20.0
Democrats	Paul Thomson	878	4.8	−13.8
Independent	Allan De Brenni	477	2.6	−1.0
Reform	Mark Mackintosh	62	0.3	+0.3
Total formal votes		18,425	98.6	+0.1
Informal votes		269	1.4	−0.1
Turnout		18,694	93.6	+1.3
Two-party-preferred result
Labor	Grant Musgrove	8,518	50.6	+11.3
Liberal	Luke Woolmer	8,327	49.4	−11.3
Labor gain from Liberal		Swing	+11.3	

1995 Queensland state election: Springwood
Party	Candidate	Votes	%	±%
Liberal	Luke Woolmer	6,846	37.9	+17.3
Labor	Molly Robson	5,732	31.8	−21.5
Democrats	Peter Collins	3,342	18.5	+18.5
Greens	William Gabriel	1,271	7.0	+7.0
Independent	Allan de Brenni	645	3.6	−3.6
Independent	Patrick O'Leary	204	1.1	+1.1
Total formal votes		18,040	98.4	+0.4
Informal votes		290	1.6	−0.4
Turnout		18,330	92.3	
Two-party-preferred result
Liberal	Luke Woolmer	10,399	60.8	+19.4
Labor	Molly Robson	6,714	39.2	−19.4
Liberal gain from Labor		Swing	+19.4	

1992 Queensland state election: Springwood
Party	Candidate	Votes	%	±%
Labor	Molly Robson	9,822	53.2	+2.9
Liberal	Kym James	3,802	20.6	−2.3
National	John Hegarty	3,507	19.0	−3.8
Independent	Allan de Brenni	1,318	7.1	+7.1
Total formal votes		18,449	98.0	
Informal votes		380	2.0	
Turnout		18,829	92.4	
Two-party-preferred result
Labor	Molly Robson	10,406	58.7	+5.6
National	John Hegarty	7,333	41.3	+41.3
Labor hold		Swing	+5.6	

=== Elections in the 1980s ===
1989 Queensland state election: Springwood
Party	Candidate	Votes	%	±%
Labor	Molly Robson	11,436	50.2	+18.1
Liberal	Christopher Macdade	5,237	23.0	+1.8
National	Huan Fraser	5,159	22.6	+4.4
Independent	Patsybeth Ridgway	956	4.2	+4.2
Total formal votes		22,788	97.6	+0.1
Informal votes		559	2.4	−0.1
Turnout		23,347	92.3	+0.5
Two-party-preferred result
Labor	Molly Robson	12,100	53.1	+9.3
National	Huan Fraser	10,688	46.9	−9.3
Labor gain from National		Swing	+9.3	

1986 Queensland state election: Springwood
Party	Candidate	Votes	%	±%
Labor	Edward Warren	5,943	32.1	
Liberal	Christopher Macdade	3,924	21.2	
National	Huan Fraser	3,364	18.2	
National	Howard Edmunds	2,893	15.6	
Independent	Kay Elson	851	4.6	
Independent	Eric Dawson	807	4.4	
Independent	Allan de Brenni	507	2.7	
Democrats	Humphrey Maltman	248	1.3	
Total formal votes		18,537	97.5	
Informal votes		469	2.5	
Turnout		19,006	91.8	
Two-party-preferred result
National	Huan Fraser	10,414	56.2	+4.0
Labor	Edward Warren	8,123	43.8	−4.0
National hold		Swing	+4.0	
