= Electoral results for the Division of Forde =

Australian division election results

This is a list of electoral results for the Division of Forde in Australian federal elections from the division's creation in 1984 until the present.

== Members ==
Member	Party	Term
David Watson	Liberal	1984–1987
Mary Crawford	Labor	1987–1996
Kay Elson	Liberal	1996–2007
Brett Raguse	Labor	2007–2010
Bert van Manen	Liberal National	2010–2025
Rowan Holzberger	Labor	2025–present

== Election results ==
=== Elections in the 2020s ===
==== 2025 ====
2025 Australian federal election: Forde
Party	Candidate	Votes	%	±%
Labor	Rowan Holzberger	36,821	34.24	+6.23
Liberal National	Bert van Manen	33,023	30.71	−6.20
Greens	Kirsty Petersen	12,280	11.42	+1.57
One Nation	Matthew Lambert	11,050	10.28	+2.27
Family First	Corneliu Pop	5,459	5.08	+5.08
Trumpet of Patriots	Jacob Hiscock	5,041	4.69	+4.69
Independent	Chris Greaves	3,187	2.96	−0.18
Citizens	Alf de Hombre	669	0.62	+0.62
Total formal votes		107,530	93.53	+0.31
Informal votes		7,438	6.47	−0.31
Turnout		114,968	85.75	+0.52
Two-party-preferred result
Labor	Rowan Holzberger	55,701	51.80	+6.03
Liberal National	Bert van Manen	51,829	48.20	−6.03
Labor gain from Liberal National		Swing	+6.03	

Results are not final. Last updated on 24 May 2025 at 1:00 AM AEST.

==== 2022 ====
2022 Australian federal election: Forde
Party	Candidate	Votes	%	±%
Liberal National	Bert van Manen	34,920	36.91	−6.59
Labor	Rowan Holzberger	26,497	28.01	−1.50
Greens	Jordan Hall	9,319	9.85	+1.12
One Nation	Seschelle Matterson	7,578	8.01	−3.80
United Australia	Roxanne O'Halloran	7,485	7.91	+3.87
Independent	Christopher Greaves	2,973	3.14	+3.14
Liberal Democrats	Tobby Sutherland	2,668	2.82	+2.82
Animal Justice	Linda McCarthy	2,444	2.58	+2.58
TNL	Samuel Holland	728	0.77	+0.77
Total formal votes		94,612	93.22	−2.14
Informal votes		6,884	6.78	+2.14
Turnout		101,496	85.23	−4.26
Two-party-preferred result
Liberal National	Bert van Manen	51,311	54.23	−4.37
Labor	Rowan Holzberger	43,301	45.77	+4.37
Liberal National hold		Swing	−4.37	

Alluvial diagram for preference flows in the seat of Forde in the 2022 federal election. indicates at what stage the winning candidate had over 50% of the votes and was declared the winner.

=== Elections in the 2010s ===
==== 2019 ====
2019 Australian federal election: Forde
Party	Candidate	Votes	%	±%
Liberal National	Bert van Manen	39,819	43.50	+2.87
Labor	Des Hardman	27,008	29.51	−8.13
One Nation	Ian Bowron	10,807	11.81	+11.81
Greens	Kirsty Petersen	7,987	8.73	+2.30
United Australia	Paul Creighton	3,696	4.04	+4.04
Conservative National	Les Innes	2,217	2.42	+2.42
Total formal votes		91,534	95.36	+0.43
Informal votes		4,449	4.64	−0.43
Turnout		95,983	89.49	+0.31
Two-party-preferred result
Liberal National	Bert van Manen	53,635	58.60	+7.97
Labor	Des Hardman	37,899	41.40	−7.97
Liberal National hold		Swing	+7.97	

==== 2016 ====
2016 Australian federal election: Forde
Party	Candidate	Votes	%	±%
Liberal National	Bert van Manen	34,096	40.63	−1.91
Labor	Des Hardman	31,587	37.64	+3.64
Greens	Sally Spain	5,393	6.43	+2.26
Independent	David Wilks	5,242	6.25	+6.25
Family First	Annelise Hellberg	4,687	5.59	+3.35
Liberty Alliance	Shaun Spain	2,905	3.46	+3.46
Total formal votes		83,910	94.93	+2.20
Informal votes		4,486	5.07	−2.20
Turnout		88,396	89.28	−3.32
Two-party-preferred result
Liberal National	Bert van Manen	42,486	50.63	−3.75
Labor	Des Hardman	41,424	49.37	+3.75
Liberal National hold		Swing	−3.75	

==== 2013 ====
2013 Australian federal election: Forde
Party	Candidate	Votes	%	±%
Liberal National	Bert van Manen	32,271	42.54	−1.54
Labor	Peter Beattie	25,794	34.00	−3.39
Palmer United	Blair Brewster	9,445	12.45	+12.45
Greens	Sally Spain	3,162	4.17	−8.05
Family First	Amanda Best	1,701	2.24	−4.08
Katter's Australian	Paul Hunter	1,652	2.18	+2.18
Rise Up Australia	Jonathan Jennings	745	0.98	+0.98
Independent	Joshua Sloss	698	0.92	+0.92
Australian Voice	Keith Douglas	262	0.35	+0.35
Citizens Electoral Council	Jan Pukallus	130	0.17	+0.17
Total formal votes		75,860	92.73	−0.14
Informal votes		5,948	7.27	+0.14
Turnout		81,808	92.60	+0.94
Two-party-preferred result
Liberal National	Bert van Manen	41,256	54.38	+2.75
Labor	Peter Beattie	34,604	45.62	−2.75
Liberal National hold		Swing	+2.75	

==== 2010 ====
2010 Australian federal election: Forde
Party	Candidate	Votes	%	±%
Liberal National	Bert van Manen	30,967	44.08	+0.01
Labor	Brett Raguse	26,268	37.39	−8.92
Greens	Petrina Maizey	8,583	12.22	+7.78
Family First	Melissa Raassina	4,440	6.32	+3.56
Total formal votes		70,258	92.87	−2.42
Informal votes		5,397	7.13	+2.42
Turnout		75,655	91.64	−1.05
Two-party-preferred result
Liberal National	Bert van Manen	36,271	51.63	+4.99
Labor	Brett Raguse	33,987	48.37	−4.99
Liberal National gain from Labor		Swing	+4.99	

=== Elections in the 2000s ===
==== 2007 ====
2007 Australian federal election: Forde
Party	Candidate	Votes	%	±%
Labor	Brett Raguse	34,721	44.35	+12.15
Liberal	Wendy Creighton	26,576	33.95	−19.14
National	Hajnal Ban	9,550	12.20	+12.12
Greens	Andy Grodecki	3,756	4.80	+0.73
Family First	Iona Abrahamson	1,756	2.24	−1.84
One Nation	Rod Evans	671	0.86	−2.87
Independent	Chris Coyle	623	0.80	+0.80
Democrats	Maaz Syed	419	0.54	−0.79
Citizens Electoral Council	Daniel Hope	216	0.28	+0.05
Total formal votes		78,288	95.39	+1.95
Informal votes		3,782	4.61	−1.95
Turnout		82,070	94.14	−0.34
Two-party-preferred result
Labor	Brett Raguse	41,419	52.91	+14.43
Liberal	Wendy Creighton	36,869	47.09	−14.43
Labor gain from Liberal		Swing	+14.43	

==== 2004 ====
2004 Australian federal election: Forde
Party	Candidate	Votes	%	±%
Liberal	Kay Elson	41,335	54.81	+5.60
Labor	Sean Leader	23,382	31.00	−2.35
Greens	Daniel Lloyd	3,076	4.08	+1.07
Family First	Shereen Hinds	2,986	3.96	+3.96
One Nation	Aaron Heaps	2,935	3.89	−5.87
Democrats	Anita Martin	1,018	1.35	−3.29
	David Gordon Howse	515	0.68	+0.68
Citizens Electoral Council	Daniel Hope	171	0.23	+0.23
Total formal votes		75,418	93.62	−0.59
Informal votes		5,143	6.38	+0.59
Turnout		80,561	93.30	+0.50
Two-party-preferred result
Liberal	Kay Elson	47,502	62.98	+6.00
Labor	Sean Leader	27,916	37.02	−6.00
Liberal hold		Swing	+6.00	

==== 2001 ====
2001 Australian federal election: Forde
Party	Candidate	Votes	%	±%
Liberal	Kay Elson	38,263	49.67	+6.92
Labor	Val Smith	25,424	33.00	+0.34
One Nation	Alice Ngahooro	7,372	9.57	−7.53
Democrats	Alan Dickson	3,620	4.70	+0.20
Greens	Rose Clyne	2,363	3.07	+0.82
Total formal votes		77,042	94.11	−1.89
Informal votes		4,825	5.89	+1.89
Turnout		81,867	95.13	
Two-party-preferred result
Liberal	Kay Elson	44,207	57.38	+2.13
Labor	Val Smith	32,835	42.62	−2.13
Liberal hold		Swing	+2.13	

=== Elections in the 1990s ===
==== 1998 ====
1998 Australian federal election: Forde
Party	Candidate	Votes	%	±%
Liberal	Kay Elson	29,358	42.74	+0.29
Labor	Peter Keech	22,431	32.66	+0.87
One Nation	Adrian Dean	11,746	17.10	+17.10
Democrats	Alan Dickson	3,093	4.50	−3.47
Greens	Daniel Habermann	1,546	2.25	−0.15
Family Law Reform	Geoff Daniels	286	0.42	+0.42
Citizens Electoral Council	Danny Hope	229	0.33	+0.33
Total formal votes		68,689	96.00	−1.33
Informal votes		2,863	4.00	+1.33
Turnout		71,552	93.23	−0.28
Two-party-preferred result
Liberal	Kay Elson	37,948	55.25	−6.76
Labor	Peter Keech	30,741	44.75	+6.76
Liberal hold		Swing	−6.76	

==== 1996 ====
1996 Australian federal election: Forde
Party	Candidate	Votes	%	±%
Liberal	Kay Elson	28,172	40.82	+3.63
Labor	Mary Crawford	23,201	33.62	−9.15
National	Garth Carey	9,833	14.25	+6.06
Democrats	Xanthe Adams	5,507	7.98	+2.69
Greens	Aaron Wise	1,683	2.44	−0.42
Indigenous Peoples	Marshall Bell	612	0.89	+0.84
Total formal votes		69,008	97.26	−0.05
Informal votes		1,943	2.74	+0.05
Turnout		70,951	93.51	−1.07
Two-party-preferred result
Liberal	Kay Elson	41,087	59.70	+9.44
Labor	Mary Crawford	27,735	40.30	−9.44
Liberal gain from Labor		Swing	+9.44	

==== 1993 ====
1993 Australian federal election: Forde
Party	Candidate	Votes	%	±%
Labor	Mary Crawford	36,227	51.76	+4.90
Liberal	Jim Planincic	23,590	33.70	−0.39
Democrats	Alan Dickson	4,085	5.84	−6.32
National	Peter Flaws	2,527	3.61	−0.51
Greens	Barry Stark	2,070	2.96	+1.41
Confederate Action	Marion Corbley	1,494	2.13	+2.13
Total formal votes		69,993	97.51	+0.16
Informal votes		1,787	2.49	−0.16
Turnout		71,780	94.58	
Two-party-preferred result
Labor	Mary Crawford	40,969	58.57	+2.22
Liberal	Jim Planincic	28,979	41.43	−2.22
Labor hold		Swing	+2.22	

==== 1990 ====
1990 Australian federal election: Forde
Party	Candidate	Votes	%	±%
Labor	Mary Crawford	28,063	43.7	−2.7
Liberal	Brad Bauman	24,232	37.7	+2.2
Democrats	Jason Neville	7,138	11.1	+5.0
Greens	Coral Wynter	2,169	3.4	+3.4
National	Ross Adams	1,967	3.1	−8.9
Independent	John Duggan	646	1.0	+1.0
Total formal votes		64,215	97.4	
Informal votes		1,717	2.6	
Turnout		65,932	94.4	
Two-party-preferred result
Labor	Mary Crawford	34,910	54.5	+3.5
Liberal	Brad Bauman	29,161	45.5	−3.5
Labor hold		Swing	+3.5	

=== Elections in the 1980s ===
==== 1987 ====
1987 Australian federal election: Forde
Party	Candidate	Votes	%	±%
Labor	Mary Crawford	27,441	46.4	+1.5
Liberal	David Watson	20,957	35.5	+3.7
National	Tony Philbrick	7,107	12.0	−4.5
Democrats	Sheila Rieff	3,582	6.1	−0.7
Total formal votes		59,087	96.7	
Informal votes		2,040	3.3	
Turnout		61,127	92.3	
Two-party-preferred result
Labor	Mary Crawford	30,152	51.0	+1.0
Liberal	David Watson	28,925	49.0	−1.0
Labor gain from Liberal		Swing	+1.0	

==== 1984 ====
1984 Australian federal election: Forde
Party	Candidate	Votes	%	±%
Labor	Hamish Linacre	23,573	44.9	−2.7
Liberal	David Watson	16,707	31.8	−9.9
National	Francis Gaffy	8,675	16.5	+13.2
Democrats	Michael Coogan	3,564	6.8	−0.8
Total formal votes		52,519	94.8	
Informal votes		2,909	5.2	
Turnout		55,428	92.0	
Two-party-preferred result
Liberal	David Watson	26,272	50.0	+2.7
Labor	Hamish Linacre	26,229	50.0	−2.7
Liberal notional gain from Labor		Swing	+2.7	
