= Electoral results for the Division of Rankin =

Australian division election results

This is a list of electoral results for the Division of Rankin in Australian federal elections from the division's creation in 1984 until the present.

== Members ==
| Member | Party | Term |
|---|---|---|
| David Beddall | Labor | 1984–1998 |
| Craig Emerson | Labor | 1998–2013 |
| Jim Chalmers | Labor | 2013–present |

== Election results ==
=== Elections in the 2020s ===
==== 2025 ====
2025 Australian federal election: Rankin
| Party | Candidate | Votes | % | ±% |
|---|---|---|---|---|
| Family First | Carol Ordish | | | |
| People First | Lana Hudson | | | |
| Liberal National | Paul Darwen | | | |
| Greens | Joshua Riethmuller | | | |
| Labor | Jim Chalmers | | | |
| Socialist Alliance | Alex Bainbridge | | | |
| One Nation | Kyle Lentz | | | |
| Trumpet of Patriots | Janet Lindbom | | | |
| Total formal votes | | | | |
| Informal votes | | | | |
| Turnout | | | | |

==== 2022 ====
2022 Australian federal election: Rankin
| Party | Candidate | Votes | % | ±% |
|---|---|---|---|---|
| Labor | Jim Chalmers | 38,596 | 43.95 | +2.52 |
| Liberal National | Paul Darwen | 25,478 | 29.01 | −2.34 |
| Greens | Neil Cotter | 9,394 | 10.70 | +1.62 |
| One Nation | Glen Cookson | 7,006 | 7.98 | −0.58 |
| United Australia | Jeff Crank | 5,064 | 5.77 | +2.08 |
| Animal Justice | Suzanne Clarke | 2,284 | 2.60 | +2.60 |
| Total formal votes | | 87,822 | 96.11 | +3.84 |
| Informal votes | | 3,553 | 3.89 | −3.84 |
| Turnout | | 91,375 | 84.56 | −4.26 |
Two-party-preferred result
| Labor | Jim Chalmers | 51,892 | 59.09 | +2.65 |
| Liberal National | Paul Darwen | 35,930 | 40.91 | −2.65 |
| Labor hold | | Swing | +2.65 | |

Alluvial diagram for preference flows in the seat of Rankin in the 2022 federal election. indicates at what stage the winning candidate had over 50% of the votes and was declared the winner.

=== Elections in the 2010s ===
==== 2019 ====
2019 Australian federal election: Rankin
| Party | Candidate | Votes | % | ±% |
|---|---|---|---|---|
| Labor | Jim Chalmers | 35,156 | 41.43 | −7.91 |
| Liberal National | Clinton Pattison | 26,608 | 31.35 | +2.72 |
| Greens | Neil Cotter | 7,709 | 9.08 | +2.79 |
| One Nation | Jesse Schneider | 7,261 | 8.56 | +8.56 |
| United Australia | Shyamal Reddy | 3,134 | 3.69 | +3.69 |
| Liberal Democrats | Ric Davies | 2,379 | 2.80 | −1.31 |
| Conservative National | Peter Andrews | 1,593 | 1.88 | +1.88 |
| Non Affiliated | Yusuf Mohammad | 1,024 | 1.21 | +1.21 |
| Total formal votes | | 84,864 | 92.27 | −1.97 |
| Informal votes | | 7,111 | 7.73 | +1.97 |
| Turnout | | 91,975 | 88.82 | −0.24 |
Two-party-preferred result
| Labor | Jim Chalmers | 47,893 | 56.44 | −4.86 |
| Liberal National | Clinton Pattison | 36,971 | 43.56 | +4.86 |
| Labor hold | | Swing | −4.86 | |

==== 2016 ====
2016 Australian federal election: Rankin
| Party | Candidate | Votes | % | ±% |
|---|---|---|---|---|
| Labor | Jim Chalmers | 42,147 | 49.34 | +7.16 |
| Liberal National | Freya Ostapovitch | 24,455 | 28.63 | −7.74 |
| Greens | Neil Cotter | 5,373 | 6.29 | +1.00 |
| Family First | Christopher Lawrie | 5,011 | 5.87 | +2.85 |
| Liberal Democrats | Ric Davies | 3,513 | 4.11 | +4.11 |
| Katter's Australian | Shane Holley | 2,874 | 3.36 | +1.32 |
| Consumer Rights | Jeffrey Hodges | 2,050 | 2.40 | +2.40 |
| Total formal votes | | 85,423 | 94.24 | +0.80 |
| Informal votes | | 5,225 | 5.76 | −0.80 |
| Turnout | | 90,648 | 89.13 | −3.13 |
Two-party-preferred result
| Labor | Jim Chalmers | 52,362 | 61.30 | +6.52 |
| Liberal National | Freya Ostapovitch | 33,061 | 38.70 | −6.52 |
| Labor hold | | Swing | +6.52 | |

==== 2013 ====
2013 Australian federal election: Rankin
| Party | Candidate | Votes | % | ±% |
|---|---|---|---|---|
| Labor | Jim Chalmers | 35,098 | 42.18 | −2.97 |
| Liberal National | David Lin | 30,260 | 36.37 | −0.73 |
| Palmer United | William Rogan | 9,228 | 11.09 | +11.09 |
| Greens | Neil Cotter | 4,405 | 5.29 | −5.91 |
| Family First | Chris Lawrie | 2,514 | 3.02 | −3.52 |
| Katter's Australian | Chris Claydon | 1,697 | 2.04 | +2.04 |
| Total formal votes | | 83,202 | 93.44 | +0.93 |
| Informal votes | | 5,840 | 6.56 | −0.93 |
| Turnout | | 89,042 | 92.27 | +0.93 |
Two-party-preferred result
| Labor | Jim Chalmers | 45,580 | 54.78 | −0.63 |
| Liberal National | David Lin | 37,622 | 45.22 | +0.63 |
| Labor hold | | Swing | −0.63 | |

==== 2010 ====
2010 Australian federal election: Rankin
| Party | Candidate | Votes | % | ±% |
|---|---|---|---|---|
| Labor | Craig Emerson | 36,090 | 45.15 | −10.98 |
| Liberal National | Luke Smith | 29,652 | 37.10 | +2.63 |
| Greens | Neil Cotter | 8,956 | 11.20 | +6.61 |
| Family First | Alexandra Todd | 5,231 | 6.54 | +3.44 |
| Total formal votes | | 79,929 | 92.51 | −3.06 |
| Informal votes | | 6,475 | 7.49 | +3.06 |
| Turnout | | 86,404 | 91.33 | −2.38 |
Two-party-preferred result
| Labor | Craig Emerson | 44,289 | 55.41 | −6.26 |
| Liberal National | Luke Smith | 35,640 | 44.59 | +6.26 |
| Labor hold | | Swing | −6.26 | |

=== Elections in the 2000s ===
==== 2007 ====
2007 Australian federal election: Rankin
| Party | Candidate | Votes | % | ±% |
|---|---|---|---|---|
| Labor | Craig Emerson | 44,858 | 56.01 | +12.22 |
| Liberal | Peter Coulson | 27,299 | 34.09 | −3.01 |
| Greens | Neil Cotter | 3,773 | 4.71 | +1.50 |
| Family First | Bert van Manen | 2,827 | 3.53 | −1.59 |
| Democrats | Salam El-Merebi | 590 | 0.74 | −0.11 |
| Liberty & Democracy | Liam Tjia | 463 | 0.58 | +0.58 |
| Citizens Electoral Council | Robert Meyers | 273 | 0.34 | +0.13 |
| Total formal votes | | 80,083 | 95.51 | +2.68 |
| Informal votes | | 3,764 | 4.49 | −2.68 |
| Turnout | | 83,847 | 93.53 | −0.56 |
Two-party-preferred result
| Labor | Craig Emerson | 49,440 | 61.74 | +8.76 |
| Liberal | Peter Coulson | 30,643 | 38.26 | −8.76 |
| Labor hold | | Swing | +8.76 | |

==== 2004 ====
2004 Australian federal election: Rankin
| Party | Candidate | Votes | % | ±% |
|---|---|---|---|---|
| Labor | Craig Emerson | 34,471 | 43.92 | −1.04 |
| Liberal | Wendy Creighton | 28,819 | 36.72 | −4.05 |
| Independent | Darren Power | 5,134 | 6.54 | +6.54 |
| Family First | Ross Wilson | 4,036 | 5.14 | +5.14 |
| Greens | Julian Hinton | 2,422 | 3.09 | +0.34 |
| One Nation | Margaret Hands | 1,601 | 2.04 | −4.57 |
| National | Mike Boyd | 1,187 | 1.51 | +1.51 |
| Democrats | Catherine Sporle | 653 | 0.83 | −3.97 |
| Citizens Electoral Council | Robert Meyers | 158 | 0.20 | +0.20 |
| Total formal votes | | 78,481 | 92.81 | −0.82 |
| Informal votes | | 6,078 | 7.19 | +0.82 |
| Turnout | | 84,559 | 92.89 | −1.06 |
Two-party-preferred result
| Labor | Craig Emerson | 41,774 | 53.23 | +0.81 |
| Liberal | Wendy Creighton | 36,707 | 46.77 | −0.81 |
| Labor hold | | Swing | +0.81 | |

==== 2001 ====
2001 Australian federal election: Rankin
| Party | Candidate | Votes | % | ±% |
|---|---|---|---|---|
| Labor | Craig Emerson | 36,875 | 49.45 | +1.97 |
| Liberal | Paul Wood | 27,524 | 36.91 | +7.00 |
| One Nation | Mark Mackenzie | 4,724 | 6.33 | −6.28 |
| Democrats | Darryl Dobson | 3,572 | 4.79 | +0.57 |
| Greens | Daniel Lloyd | 1,875 | 2.51 | +0.30 |
| Total formal votes | | 74,570 | 93.40 | −2.15 |
| Informal votes | | 5,269 | 6.60 | +2.15 |
| Turnout | | 79,839 | 94.18 | |
Two-party-preferred result
| Labor | Craig Emerson | 42,267 | 56.68 | −2.01 |
| Liberal | Paul Wood | 32,303 | 43.32 | +2.01 |
| Labor hold | | Swing | −2.01 | |

=== Elections in the 1990s ===
==== 1998 ====
1998 Australian federal election: Rankin
| Party | Candidate | Votes | % | ±% |
|---|---|---|---|---|
| Labor | Craig Emerson | 32,924 | 47.48 | +4.91 |
| Liberal | Cuong Bui | 20,736 | 29.91 | −12.67 |
| One Nation | Ron Frood | 8,749 | 12.62 | +12.62 |
| Democrats | Robert Hernandez | 2,923 | 4.22 | −4.37 |
| Christian Democrats | Ann Hage | 1,556 | 2.24 | +2.24 |
| Greens | Sara van Tinteren | 1,536 | 2.22 | −0.74 |
| Independent | Brian Norton | 456 | 0.66 | +0.66 |
| Independent | Lorraine Barnes | 456 | 0.66 | +0.66 |
| Total formal votes | | 69,336 | 95.55 | −1.27 |
| Informal votes | | 3,228 | 4.45 | +1.27 |
| Turnout | | 72,564 | 93.07 | −0.44 |
Two-party-preferred result
| Labor | Craig Emerson | 40,691 | 58.69 | +9.07 |
| Liberal | Cuong Bui | 28,645 | 41.31 | −9.07 |
| Labor gain from Liberal | | Swing | +9.07 | |

==== 1996 ====
1996 Australian federal election: Rankin
| Party | Candidate | Votes | % | ±% |
|---|---|---|---|---|
| Labor | David Beddall | 31,869 | 45.00 | −9.93 |
| Liberal | Amanda Scott | 29,046 | 41.02 | +10.39 |
| Democrats | Alan Dickson | 6,050 | 8.54 | +3.52 |
| Greens | Richard Nielsen | 1,977 | 2.79 | +0.07 |
| Indigenous Peoples | Rosemary Bell | 976 | 1.38 | +1.38 |
| Independent | Xuan Thu Nguyen | 899 | 1.27 | +1.27 |
| Total formal votes | | 70,817 | 96.61 | −0.52 |
| Informal votes | | 2,488 | 3.39 | +0.52 |
| Turnout | | 73,305 | 93.51 | −1.65 |
Two-party-preferred result
| Labor | David Beddall | 36,278 | 51.35 | −11.69 |
| Liberal | Amanda Scott | 34,371 | 48.65 | +11.69 |
| Labor hold | | Swing | −11.69 | |

==== 1993 ====
1993 Australian federal election: Rankin
| Party | Candidate | Votes | % | ±% |
|---|---|---|---|---|
| Labor | David Beddall | 32,157 | 45.19 | +0.94 |
| Liberal | Sallyanne Atkinson | 25,635 | 36.03 | +4.84 |
| National | Marian Schwarz | 5,051 | 7.10 | −2.84 |
| Democrats | Susan Werba | 3,106 | 4.37 | −7.88 |
| Greens | Richard Nielsen | 1,775 | 2.49 | +2.40 |
| Independent | Ian Reid | 1,722 | 2.42 | +2.42 |
| Confederate Action | Lester Reaves | 1,290 | 1.81 | +1.81 |
| | Debbie Bell | 419 | 0.59 | +0.59 |
| Total formal votes | | 71,155 | 96.97 | −0.09 |
| Informal votes | | 2,226 | 3.03 | +0.09 |
| Turnout | | 73,381 | 95.16 | |
Two-party-preferred result
| Labor | David Beddall | 37,449 | 52.67 | −0.49 |
| Liberal | Sallyanne Atkinson | 33,647 | 47.33 | +0.49 |
| Labor hold | | Swing | −0.49 | |

==== 1990 ====
1990 Australian federal election: Rankin
| Party | Candidate | Votes | % | ±% |
|---|---|---|---|---|
| Labor | David Beddall | 31,782 | 46.3 | −2.9 |
| Liberal | John Miles | 16,014 | 23.3 | +10.2 |
| National | Huan Fraser | 11,065 | 16.1 | −15.9 |
| Democrats | John Hoskins | 7,512 | 10.9 | +6.5 |
| Independent | Richard Whiteman | 1,865 | 2.7 | +2.7 |
| Independent | Cheryl Crisp | 465 | 0.7 | +0.7 |
| Total formal votes | | 68,703 | 97.3 | |
| Informal votes | | 1,916 | 2.7 | |
| Turnout | | 70,619 | 94.2 | |
Two-party-preferred result
| Labor | David Beddall | 38,037 | 55.5 | +0.7 |
| Liberal | John Miles | 30,519 | 44.5 | +44.5 |
| Labor hold | | Swing | +0.7 | |

=== Elections in the 1980s ===
==== 1987 ====
1987 Australian federal election: Rankin
| Party | Candidate | Votes | % | ±% |
|---|---|---|---|---|
| Labor | David Beddall | 29,118 | 49.2 | +2.5 |
| National | Gerard Walsh | 13,256 | 22.4 | −1.3 |
| Liberal | John Patterson | 7,769 | 13.1 | −1.3 |
| National | Peter Jorgenson | 5,708 | 9.6 | +9.6 |
| Democrats | Miriam Cope | 2,599 | 4.4 | −1.2 |
| Independent | Michael Dunne | 670 | 1.1 | +1.1 |
| Independent | Terri Cavanagh | 99 | 0.2 | +0.2 |
| Total formal votes | | 59,219 | 95.8 | |
| Informal votes | | 2,578 | 4.2 | |
| Turnout | | 67,797 | 92.1 | |
Two-party-preferred result
| Labor | David Beddall | 32,415 | 54.7 | +4.2 |
| National | Gerard Walsh | 26,791 | 45.3 | −4.2 |
| Labor hold | | Swing | +4.2 | |

==== 1984 ====
1984 Australian federal election: Rankin
| Party | Candidate | Votes | % | ±% |
|---|---|---|---|---|
| Labor | David Beddall | 23,820 | 46.7 | −3.9 |
| National | Cec Jamieson | 16,998 | 33.3 | +12.7 |
| Liberal | Bruce Mackenzie-Forbes | 7,324 | 14.4 | −8.5 |
| Democrats | Bev Peereboom | 2,880 | 5.6 | +0.7 |
| Total formal votes | | 51,022 | 94.2 | |
| Informal votes | | 3,150 | 5.8 | |
| Turnout | | 54,172 | 91.8 | |
Two-party-preferred result
| Labor | David Beddall | 25,807 | 50.6 | −4.6 |
| National | Cec Jamieson | 25,199 | 49.4 | +49.4 |
| Labor hold | | Swing | −4.6 | |
