= Jon Raven (politician) =

Australian politician

Mayor Jon Raven

Mayor of Logan City
- Incumbent
- Assumed office 16 March 2024
- Deputy: Scott Bannan
- Preceded by: Darren Power

Deputy Mayor of Logan City
- In office April 29, 2020 – April 27, 2022
- Mayor: Darren Power
- Succeeded by: Natalie Willcocks

Logan City Councillor for Division 5
- In office 28 March 2020 – 16 March 2024
- Succeeded by: Paul Jackson
- In office 19 March 2016 – 2 May 2019
- Preceded by: Graham Able
- Succeeded by: Council administration

Advocate for the City of Logan
- In office 1 June 2019 – 31 December 2019
- Preceded by: Position established
- Succeeded by: Position abolished

Personal details
- Party: Independent Labor
- Spouse: Allison
- Children: 2
- Occupation: Small business owner

Jon Raven is an Australian politician currently serving as the Mayor Logan City, the fourth-most populous local government area (LGA) in the Australian state of Queensland. He has served in this position since his election in March 2024, and concurrently serves as a director of the Council of Mayors South East Queensland (SEQ), and the Logan City representative to the Local Government Association of Queensland (LGAQ) and Australian Local Government Association (ALGA).

Prior to his election as mayor, Raven served as a member of Logan City Council, representing Division 5 from 2016 to 2019. Under council administration in 2019, he served as a member of the Interim Management Committee of Logan and was re-elected to council in 2020. He was elected the Chair of the Planning, Economic Development and Environment Committee in the same year. Raven was elected by unanimous council vote to become Deputy Mayor of Logan on April 29, 2020 for a one year term. He was re-elected to this position in April 2021 for a second consecutive term.

== Personal life and career ==
Prior to his election to council, Raven owned and operated an asbestos removal and demolition business and served as the managing director of Advanced Deconstruction.

He is a member of the Labor Party, however has not been endorsed by the party in local government elections.

Raven is a patron and supporter of registered charity Empower Assistance Dogs.

He currently residents in Waterford West with his two children and partner Allison. He and Allison married in a backyard ceremony in July 2024.

== Logan City Councillor ==
In April 2019, Raven became one of only four remaining Logan City councillors, as eight others along with mayor Luke Smith were automatically suspended following the Crime and Corruption Commission handing down charges of corruption on each of them as part of Operation Belcarra. Following their suspension, Queensland Local Government Minister Stirling Hinchliffe dismissed Logan City Council and placed it under formal administration, citing the inability for the remaining four councillors to form a working quorum. Along with the three other remaining councillors, Raven was appointed to an advisory position assisting the administrator, known originally as Advocates for the City of Logan but formally titled the Logan City Interim Management Committee.

In November 2023, Raven announced his candidacy for mayor in the upcoming local government elections, noting "managing growth and cost-of-living-pressure, and delivering infrastructure and services to the city" as his top priorities.

In 2024, Raven received a positive endorsement by local multicultural print and online publication Brisbane Indian Times, who described him as "dedicated and hardworking."

== Mayor of Logan City ==
In July 2024, Raven announced that the City of Logan was hiring 48 new development approvals staff to "cut red tape and get people into new homes faster."

Mayor Raven announced the expansion of the Logan City safety camera network, which included the use of AI technology with mobile and covert cameras. Approximately 1300 cameras were in operation throughout the city, with 30 being added annually.

=== Mayoral election results ===
Incumbent mayor Darren Power (Independent) did not recontest

2024 Queensland mayoral elections: Logan
Party	Candidate	Votes	%	±%
Independent Labor	Jon Raven	92,858	55.58	+55.58
Independent	Brett Raguse	49,997	29.92	+11.01
Independent	James Reid	24,221	14.50	+14.50
Total formal votes		167,076	93.57	+1.73
Informal votes		11,486	6.43	−1.73
Turnout		178,562	78.60	+2.43
Two-candidate-preferred result
Independent Labor	Jon Raven	96,472	63.59	+63.59
Independent	Brett Raguse	55,229	36.41	+0.45
Independent Labor gain from Independent		Swing	N/A	
