= Kingston Pioneer Cemetery =

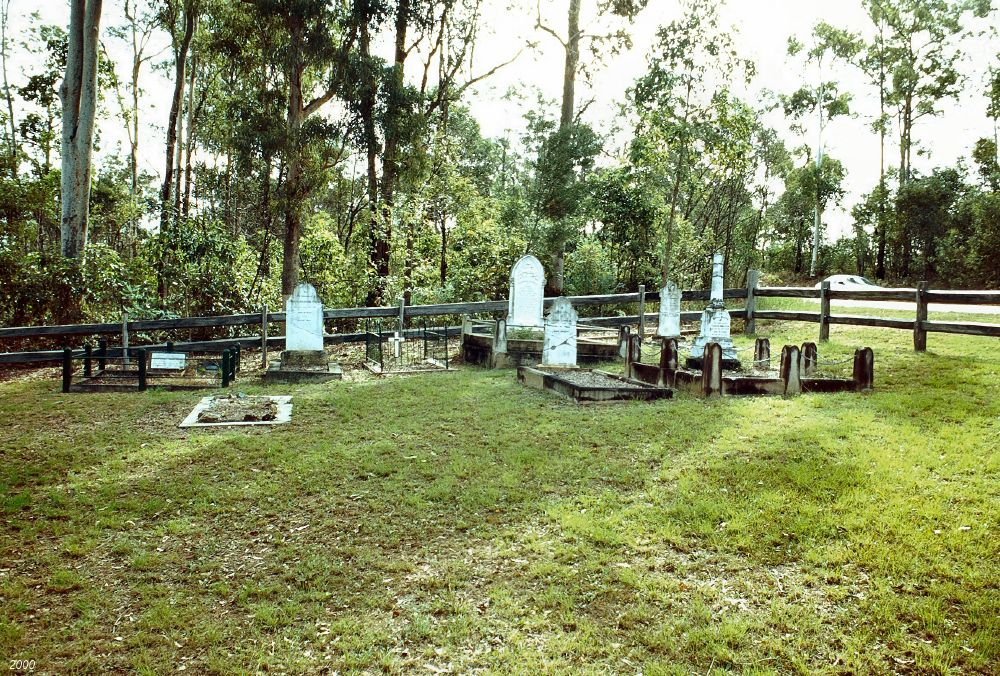
- Kingston Pioneer Cemetery

- Location within Queensland Location within Australia
- 27.6642°S 153.1119°E
- Location: Bega Road, Kingston, City of Logan, Queensland, Australia

History
- Design period: 1870s–1890s (late 19th century)
- Built: 1896–1941

Queensland Heritage Register
- Official name: Kingston Pioneer Cemetery
- Type: state heritage (built, landscape)
- Designated: 26 May 2000
- Reference no.: 601495
- Significant period: 1896–1941 (fabric, historical); 1896– (social)
- Significant components: burial/grave, gate – entrance, plaque, cemetery, sign, headstone, fence/wall - perimeter

Kingston Pioneer Cemetery is a heritage-listed cemetery at Bega Road, Kingston, City of Logan, Queensland, Australia. It was built from 1896 to 1941. It was added to the Queensland Heritage Register on 26 May 2000.

== History ==
The Kingston Pioneer Cemetery, on 2 small blocks of land in Kingston, was used as burial ground at least between 1896 and 1941. It is not known exactly when the land first came into use as a cemetery; however, the first known burial was in 1896 and the last in 1941. The graves of early pioneers, Charles and Harriett Kingston and John and Emily Mayes, are located in the cemetery.

Captain Patrick Logan led the first expedition to explore the area south of Brisbane in 1827, and travelled through the area now known as Logan City. He described the area as having very fine timber and quite a few swamps. In 1849, ten years after the closure of the Moreton Bay convict settlement, the 50 miles (80 km) ban around the settlement was lifted, and the first leases of land around the Logan River took place. With the separation of Queensland from New South Wales in 1859, the new Queensland Government realised there was a problem, having too much land and not enough residents. Consequently, the government embarked on a program to encourage new immigrants to settle in Queensland from overseas, by giving them a land order when they arrived.

Europeans began to settle around Loganholme in 1863, growing crops such as cotton and sugar cane. Already by this time, a cotton mill and sugar mill had been established. In 1868 James Trahey purchased a block of land where the Kingston railway station would eventually be located. At the time the area was known as Scrubby Creek. Trahey was the first settler to buy land in the area; however he moved away after only a very brief time.

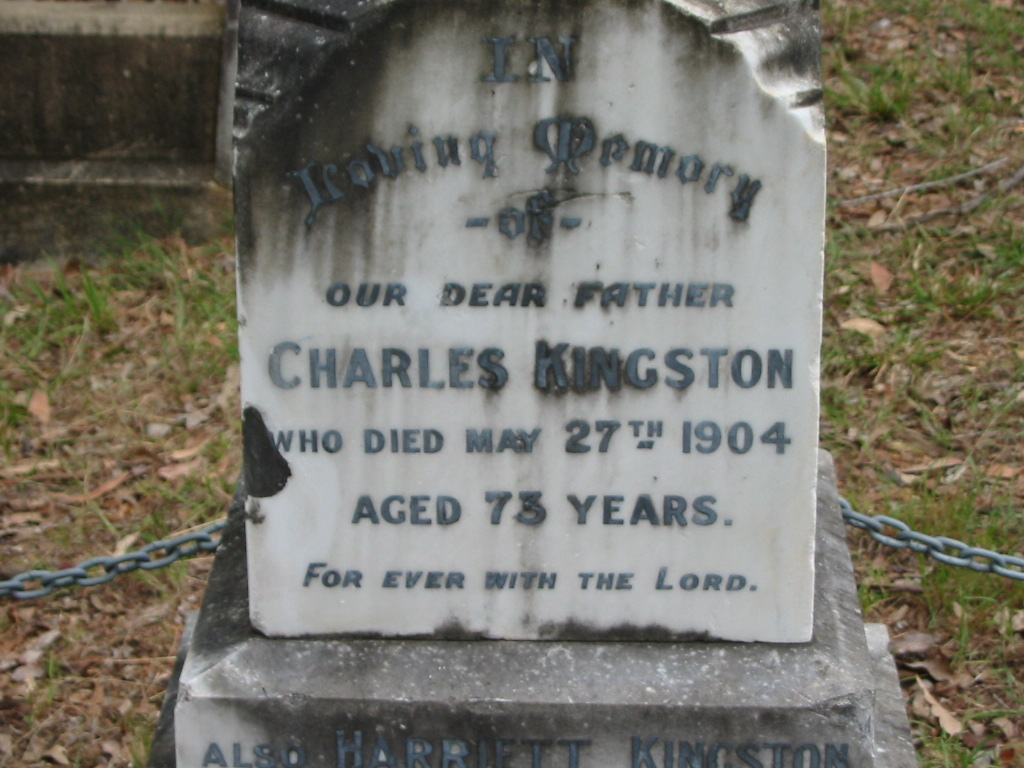
Charles Kingston headstone, 2006

Charles Kingston and his family (after whom the suburb was named) arrived in Australia in 1857. The family moved around the Brisbane area several times, including to Redbank, Oxley and Eight Mile Plains before settling on land near Scrubby Creek which Kingston had purchased in 1872. The Kingston's property was known as Oakwood. John Mayes and his family also moved to the Scrubby Creek area from England around the same time as the Kingstons. Other settlers, such as James Laughlin and the Armstrongs also selected land in the vicinity.

Early industries that thrived in the area were timber getting, cotton growing and sugar growing. But it was soon realised that the area was very suitable for dairying and fruit growing due to the Logan River, and small swamps and creeks in the area. Both the Kingston and the Mayes families were involved in fruit growing, particularly grapes, and the area became known to produce excellent wines before the 1900s. There was also a coal mine and a metal and gravel quarry in the area.

In 1877 the first post office for the immediate area was established, on the same site as Oakwood (the Kingston's home). Eight years later, in 1885 a rail service from Loganlea to Stanley Street in Brisbane was opened, the tracks passed through Charles Kingston's property.

In 1888, Charles and his wife Harriett returned to visit England, and on their return made plans to build a new house, much grander than the first. The new home was built in 1890, on a hill which overlooked the railway station. Kingston House became a landmark for the district and is heritage-listed today. Their home (now at 5 Collin Court) could be seen from many points around Kingston, and the large ballroom in Kingston House was the centre of social life in the district. Charles Kingston died in 1904, three months after he and Harriett celebrated their 50th wedding anniversary. Harriett Kingston died in 1911. Both are buried at the Kingston Pioneer cemetery.

Although the area in which the Kingston Pioneer Cemetery is situated is marked on an 1875 map as a reserve, it is not specifically labelled as a cemetery reserve and the date of the first burial is unknown. The earliest known grave is the cemetery is that of Frances Armstrong who was buried there in 1896.

The graves of John and Emily Mayes are also found in the Kingston Pioneer Cemetery. John, Emily and their two small children arrived in Australia as free settlers on 9 July 1871 from England aboard the Indus. The family moved from Brisbane to Waterford, where they selected a property of 321 acres (130 ha) soon after their arrival. The Mayes' lease was subject to conditions requiring improvements under the provisions of the Crown Lands Alienation Act (1868). The Kingston family were also subject to the same leasing requirements.

When they arrived at what was to become Kingston, the Mayes family lived in a tent on the property, but in 1872 a small timber slab hut was constructed, now known as Mayes Cottage. The Mayes family were supported principally by timber getting on the property. Later, the Mayes family were involved in dairying and, in 1906, purchased shares in the newly formed Kingston Cooperative Dairy Company.

John Mayes died on 10 June 1908 and was buried in the Kingston Pioneer Cemetery. Emily married John's brother Richard and moved to Mooloolah; however, following her death in 1933, she was buried in the Kingston Pioneer Cemetery.

== Description ==
The Kingston Pioneer Cemetery is on two blocks of land either side of the driveway entering Kingston College, off Bega Road. The main, or larger, cemetery can be seen from Bega Road, the second, smaller cemetery, is located off Pioneer Road, in a south-easterly direction, approximately 50 metres (160 ft) from the main cemetery.

In the larger cemetery, which measures approximately 18 by 30 metres (59 by 98 ft), there are eleven graves, five of which are multiple burials. Of the eleven graves, seven are identified and four are unmarked. It is possible that there are more unmarked graves indicated by the spacing between some of the visible plots. The cemetery is on a grassed area surrounded by a timber slip rail fence with an entrance gate along the eastern boundary. Along the western boundary of the fence there is a half metre gap between the cemetery and a small area of bushland.

A number of the graves are marked by large concrete headstones with decorative motifs. The grave of Charles Kingston is marked by an obelisk on a three tier plinth. The top of the obelisk has been broken off. Another grave, with two burials, is marked out by a low concrete enclosure with a concrete headstone with a marble plaque. Other graves are surrounded by metal fencing, some of which have decorative finials.

The smaller cemetery, which measures approximately 5 by 15 metres (16 by 49 ft), is located off Pioneer Lane adjacent to Kingston College, and is thought to have been the Catholic section of the cemetery. In this cemetery there are 7 graves, one of which holds four burials. Two graves are unmarked; however, the size of the graves suggests the deceased may be children.

The grave with the four burials is identified with a large concrete cross with decorative motifs and a plaque with the names of the deceased, another grave is marked out by a simple white, timber cross. All the graves, including the two small, unmarked graves, are surrounded by a metal fence with decorative elements such as finials.

Logan City Council has placed interpretive signage at both cemeteries and both are currently maintained by the council, which has also undertaken conservation work on some of the headstones.

== Heritage listing ==
Kingston Pioneer Cemetery was listed on the Queensland Heritage Register on 26 May 2000 having satisfied the following criteria.

The place is important in demonstrating the evolution or pattern of Queensland's history.

The graves of Charles and Harriett Kingston and John and Emily Mayes are found in the cemetery. The Kingston and Mayes families were two of the first pioneer settlers in the area, which was then known as Scrubby Creek. The cemetery is significant not only as the final resting place of some of the earliest non-Indigenous settlers in the area, but is also significant for its association with the descendants of those buried in the cemetery many of whom remain in the Kingston/Logan area.

The place has a strong or special association with a particular community or cultural group for social, cultural or spiritual reasons.

It is significant for its association with the Kingston, Mayes and Armstrong families who contributed to the settlement and growth of the Logan area, particularly from the 1870s through to the mid-1940s.

The place has a special association with the life or work of a particular person, group or organisation of importance in Queensland's history.

The cemetery has a strong association with the people of Logan City, and the suburb of Kingston in particular.
