= Electoral results for the district of Moggill =

Queensland, Australia, district election results

This is a list of electoral results for the electoral district of Moggill in the Queensland state elections.

== Members for Moggill ==
Member	Party	Term
Bill Lickiss	Liberal	1986–1989
Dr David Watson	Liberal	1989–2004
Bruce Flegg	Liberal	2004–2008
Bruce Flegg	Liberal National	2008–2015
Dr Christian Rowan	Liberal National	2015–present

== Election results ==
=== Elections in the 2020s ===
2024 Queensland state election: Moggill
Party	Candidate	Votes	%	±%
Liberal National	Christian Rowan	16,003	48.51	+1.61
Labor	Eric Richman	8,655	26.24	−2.16
Greens	Andrew Kidd	6,768	20.52	−0.06
One Nation	Cheryl Wood	1,562	4.73	+1.83
Total formal votes		32,988	97.8	
Informal votes		727	2.2	
Turnout		33,715	91.20	
Two-party-preferred result
Liberal National	Christian Rowan	18,350	55.63	+2.03
Labor	Eric Richman	14,638	44.37	−2.03
Liberal National hold		Swing	+2.03	

2020 Queensland state election: Moggill
Party	Candidate	Votes	%	±%
Liberal National	Christian Rowan	14,888	46.89	−1.79
Labor	Roberta Albrecht	9,012	28.38	+1.88
Greens	Lawson McCane	6,536	20.58	−0.32
One Nation	Bruce Mitchell	922	2.90	+2.90
Civil Liberties & Motorists	Amy Rayward	395	1.24	−2.68
Total formal votes		31,753	98.31	+1.05
Informal votes		546	1.69	−1.05
Turnout		32,299	92.45	+1.16
Two-party-preferred result
Liberal National	Christian Rowan	17,016	53.59	−1.44
Labor	Roberta Albrecht	14,737	46.41	+1.44
Liberal National hold		Swing	−1.44	

=== Elections in the 2010s ===
2017 Queensland state election: Moggill
Party	Candidate	Votes	%	±%
Liberal National	Christian Rowan	15,085	48.7	−1.4
Labor	Evan Jones	8,212	26.5	+1.2
Greens	Lawson McCane	6,479	20.9	+4.9
Consumer Rights	Amy Rayward	1,215	3.9	+3.9
Total formal votes		30,991	97.3	−1.2
Informal votes		873	2.7	+1.2
Turnout		31,864	91.3	+0.6
Two-party-preferred result
Liberal National	Christian Rowan	17,055	55.0	−3.1
Labor	Evan Jones	13,936	45.0	+3.1
Liberal National hold		Swing	−3.1	

2015 Queensland state election: Moggill
Party	Candidate	Votes	%	±%
Liberal National	Christian Rowan	15,104	50.16	−13.11
Labor	Louisa Pink	7,600	25.24	+9.58
Greens	Charles Worringham	4,758	15.80	+2.00
Independent	Barry Anthony Searle	1,959	6.51	+6.51
Palmer United	Dion Van Zyl	692	2.30	+2.30
Total formal votes		30,113	98.51	−0.01
Informal votes		455	1.49	+0.01
Turnout		30,568	91.93	−0.91
Two-party-preferred result
Liberal National	Christian Rowan	16,403	58.21	−15.70
Labor	Louisa Pink	11,778	41.79	+15.70
Liberal National hold		Swing	−15.70	

2012 Queensland state election: Moggill
Party	Candidate	Votes	%	±%
Liberal National	Bruce Flegg	18,348	63.27	+14.09
Labor	Michael Nelson	4,540	15.65	−8.96
Greens	Jake Schoermer	4,001	13.80	−0.15
Katter's Australian	Barry Searle	2,112	7.28	+7.28
Total formal votes		29,001	98.52	−0.33
Informal votes		435	1.48	+0.33
Turnout		29,436	92.84	+0.16
Two-party-preferred result
Liberal National	Bruce Flegg	19,703	73.91	+12.63
Labor	Michael Nelson	6,956	26.09	−12.63
Liberal National hold		Swing	+12.63	

=== Elections in the 2000s ===
2009 Queensland state election: Moggill
Party	Candidate	Votes	%	±%
Liberal National	Bruce Flegg	13,826	49.2	−1.5
Labor	Robert Colvin	6,918	24.6	−7.4
Greens	Philip Machanick	3,921	13.9	−3.3
Independent	Barry Searle	2,346	8.3	+8.3
DS4SEQ	Andrew Bradbury	1,102	3.9	+3.9
Total formal votes		28,113	98.7	
Informal votes		328	1.3	
Turnout		28,441	92.7	
Two-party-preferred result
Liberal National	Bruce Flegg	15,586	61.3	+3.3
Labor	Robert Colvin	9,847	38.7	−3.3
Liberal National hold		Swing	+3.3	

2006 Queensland state election: Moggill
Party	Candidate	Votes	%	±%
Liberal	Bruce Flegg	13,237	50.7	−1.4
Labor	Lisa Rayner	8,362	32.0	−3.6
Greens	Geoff Munck	4,510	17.3	+5.0
Total formal votes		26,109	98.6	−0.2
Informal votes		364	1.4	+0.2
Turnout		26,473	91.5	−1.1
Two-party-preferred result
Liberal	Bruce Flegg	14,299	57.9	+1.6
Labor	Lisa Rayner	10,376	42.1	−1.6
Liberal hold		Swing	+1.6	

2004 Queensland state election: Moggill
Party	Candidate	Votes	%	±%
Liberal	Bruce Flegg	13,255	52.1	+11.7
Labor	Lisa Rayner	9,075	35.6	−2.9
Greens	Lenore Taylor	3,133	12.3	+5.9
Total formal votes		25,463	98.8	+0.3
Informal votes		317	1.2	−0.3
Turnout		25,780	92.6	−0.3
Two-party-preferred result
Liberal	Bruce Flegg	13,867	56.3	+5.4
Labor	Lisa Rayner	10,749	43.7	−5.4
Liberal hold		Swing	+5.4	

2001 Queensland state election: Moggill
Party	Candidate	Votes	%	±%
Liberal	David Watson	9,872	40.4	−12.9
Labor	Laurie Lumsden	9,408	38.5	+4.7
Independent	Barry Searle	2,263	9.3	+9.3
Greens	Lenore Taylor	1,566	6.4	+0.1
Democrats	John Yesberg	1,355	5.5	−1.2
Total formal votes		24,464	98.5	
Informal votes		373	1.5	
Turnout		24,837	92.9	
Two-party-preferred result
Liberal	David Watson	11,404	50.9	−8.0
Labor	Laurie Lumsden	11,008	49.1	+8.0
Liberal hold		Swing	−8.0	

=== Elections in the 1990s ===
1998 Queensland state election: Moggill
Party	Candidate	Votes	%	±%
Liberal	David Watson	12,202	53.3	−13.7
Labor	Laurie Lumsden	7,739	33.8	+0.7
Democrats	Kirsty Fraser	1,531	6.7	+6.7
Greens	Brett Sloan	1,436	6.3	+6.3
Total formal votes		22,908	98.6	+0.4
Informal votes		323	1.4	−0.4
Turnout		23,231	92.9	+0.7
Two-party-preferred result
Liberal	David Watson	13,117	58.9	−8.0
Labor	Laurie Lumsden	9,140	41.1	+8.0
Liberal hold		Swing	−8.0	

1995 Queensland state election: Moggill
Party	Candidate	Votes	%	±%
Liberal	David Watson	14,246	66.9	+20.6
Labor	Laurie Lumsden	7,041	33.1	−4.5
Total formal votes		21,287	98.2	−0.4
Informal votes		388	1.8	+0.4
Turnout		21,675	92.2	
Liberal hold		Swing	+7.8	

1992 Queensland state election: Moggill
Party	Candidate	Votes	%	±%
Liberal	David Watson	9,389	46.4	+3.3
Labor	Laurie Lumsden	7,606	37.6	−3.2
National	Trevor St Baker	2,352	11.6	+0.4
Independent	Geoff Wilson	905	4.5	+4.5
Total formal votes		20,252	98.6	
Informal votes		294	1.4	
Turnout		20,546	91.9	
Two-party-preferred result
Liberal	David Watson	11,694	59.1	+3.6
Labor	Laurie Lumsden	8,101	40.9	−3.6
Liberal hold		Swing	+3.6	

=== Elections in the 1980s ===
1989 Queensland state election: Moggill
Party	Candidate	Votes	%	±%
Liberal	David Watson	8,004	42.8	+0.6
Labor	Robyn Campbell	7,509	40.2	+17.0
National	Trevor St Baker	2,245	12.0	−18.2
Greens	James Fredericks	939	5.0	+5.0
Total formal votes		18,697	98.2	−0.5
Informal votes		338	1.8	+0.5
Turnout		19,035	92.2	+0.0
Two-party-preferred result
Liberal	David Watson	10,469	56.0	−12.1
Labor	Robyn Campbell	8,228	44.0	+44.0
Liberal hold		Swing	−12.1	

1986 Queensland state election: Moggill
Party	Candidate	Votes	%	±%
Liberal	Bill Lickiss	7,082	42.2	
National	Douglas Mactaggart	5,070	30.2	
Labor	Harry Thornton	3,899	23.2	
Democrats	Geoffrey Fawthrop	735	4.4	
Total formal votes		16,786	98.7	
Informal votes		214	1.3	
Turnout		17,000	92.2	
Two-party-preferred result
Liberal	Bill Lickiss	11,868	70.7	+2.9
Labor	Harry Thornton	4,918	29.3	−2.9
Two-candidate-preferred result
Liberal	Bill Lickiss	11,428	68.1	
National	Douglas Mactaggart	5,358	31.9	
Liberal hold		Swing	N/A	
