= Mayor Power =

Mayor Power may refer to:

- Darren Power, mayor of Logan City, Australia
- Victor M. Power, mayor of Timmins, Ontario, Canada

== See also ==
- Power (disambiguation)
