= Kingston, Queensland =

Kingston
- Town
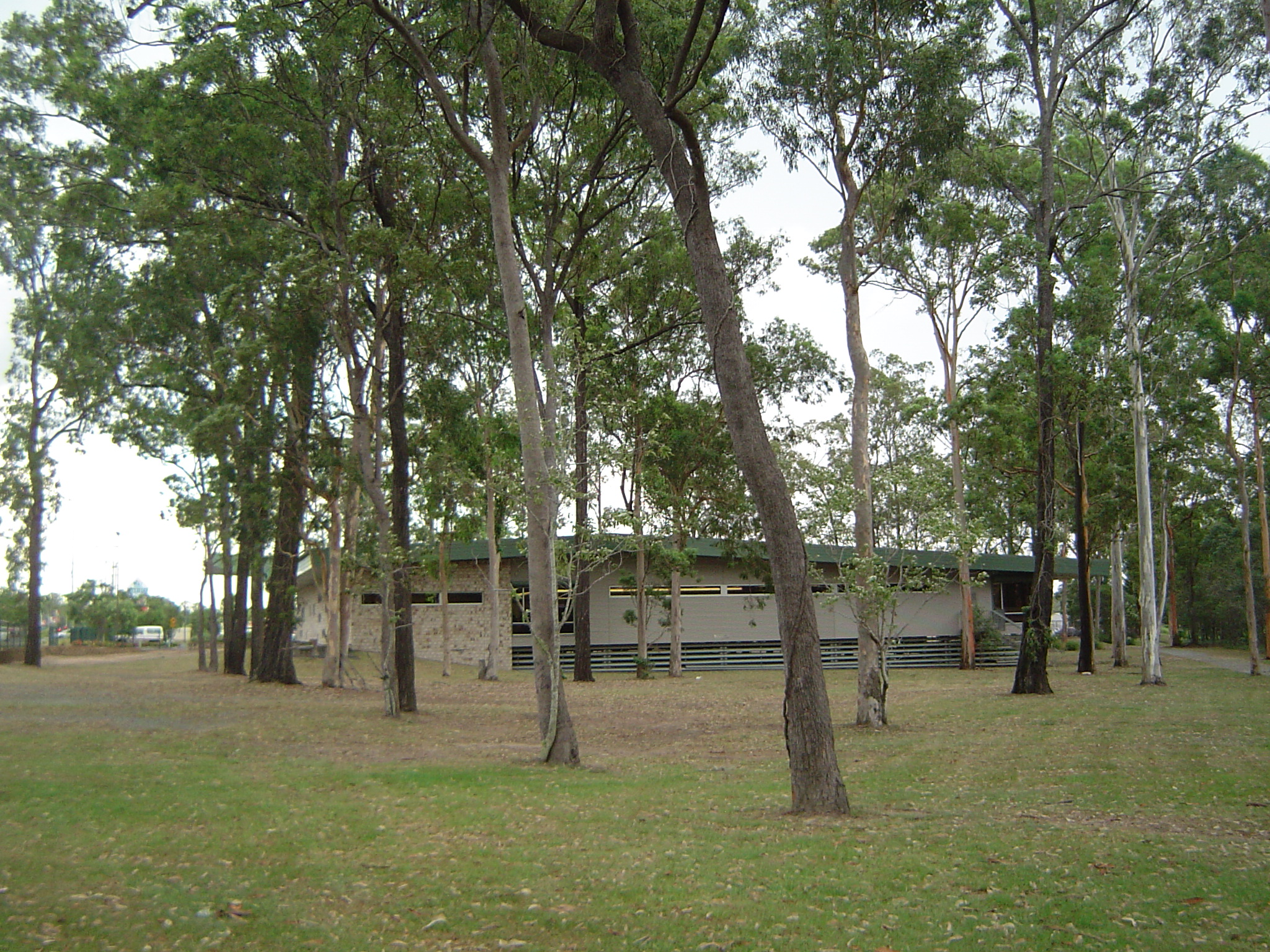
- Marsden library is located in the far south of the suburb

- Interactive map of Kingston
- Coordinates: 27.6566°S 153.1177°E
- Country: Australia
- State: Queensland
- City: Logan City
- LGA: Logan City
- Location: 2.7 km (1.7 mi) SSE of Logan Central; 26.2 km (16.3 mi) SSE of Brisbane CBD; 56 km (35 mi) NNW of Surfers Paradise

Government
  - State electorates: Woodridge; Waterford
  - Federal division: Rankin

Area
  - Total: 6.7 km^{2} (2.6 sq mi)

Population
  - Total: 10,506 (2021 census)
  - Density: 1,568/km^{2} (4,061/sq mi)
- Time zone: UTC+10:00 (AEST)
- Postcode: 4114
Localities around Kingston
Berrinba	Logan Central	Slacks Creek
Berrinba	Kingston	Meadowbrook
Marsden	Waterford West	Loganlea

Kingston is a town and suburb in the City of Logan, Queensland, Australia. In the 2021 census, the suburb of Kingston had a population of 10,506 people.

== Geography ==
Kingston is a predominantly residential suburb, with a low mix of industrial, commercial and retail areas. The suburb is bounded in the south by Scrubby Creek, a tributary of the Logan River. It is the home of the Kingston Butter Factory. Kingston was also the site of an environmental disaster similar to Love Canal in Niagara Falls in the United States.

== History ==
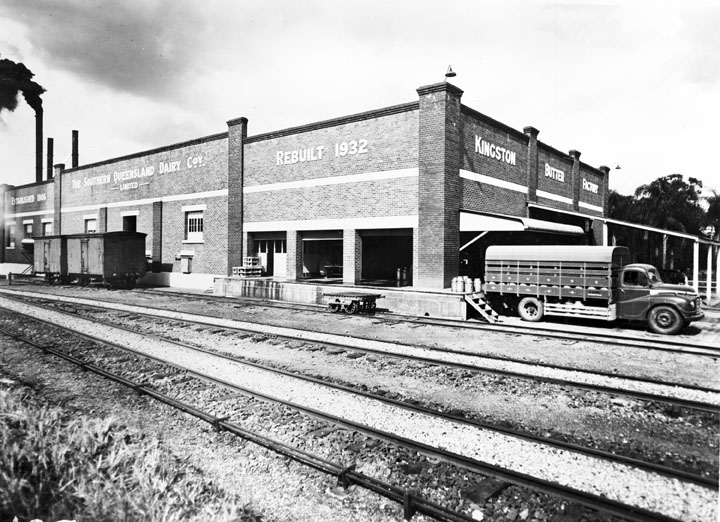
Kingston Butter Factory in 1952

The township was named Kingston in 1890 Charles and Harriet Kingston, who were residents of the district in the late nineteenth century.

Like a number of other Logan City suburbs Kingston was once part of the Shire of Tingalpa. Dairying grew in importance in the area from the 1890s and in 1906 a meeting was held in Beenleigh to form a co-operative butter factory locally. The Southern Queensland Co-operative Dairy Company opened its factory in Kingston in June 1907. A piggery was established nearby in 1926 and pigs were fed on the buttermilk from the factory. The Kingston Butter Factory was enlarged in 1932 and operated successfully until after the war, when the dairying industry was being rationalised by the government. Peters bought the factory in 1958 and it ceased production in 1983. It now operates as a community arts centre and houses a theatre, arts and crafts stall and museum. The Kingston Butter Factory is on the Logan City Council Local Heritage Register for its historical, social and technological significance.

In October 1885, 72 subdivided blocks of land named "Kingston Railway Station Estate" were advertised to be auctioned by John W Todd. A map advertising the auction shows that the blocks were close to Kingston Railway Station and a selling feature of the estate was the extensive and picturesque views.

Kingston State School opened on 8 July 1912.

The other major industrial activity of the area was the Kingston gold mine at Mount Taylor. Although gold was discovered in 1885, a geological survey was not undertaken until 1913 and underground mining began. In 1932, the Kingston Gold Mining Company began an open cut operation and mining continued until 1954. The area became an unofficial waste dump. It was eventually backfilled and subdivided into a housing estate in the late 1960s.

Kingston State Infants School opened on 27 January 1976. It closed on 17 December 1993.

Kingston State High School was established in Bega Road on 24 January 1977. It was officially opened by the Minister for Education, Val Bird. Its students come mainly from the residential suburbs of Kingston, Marsden, Browns Plains, Loganlea, and Woodridge. On 1 November 1999 it was renamed Kingston College.

In 1985, the suburb of Logan Central was created, consisted only of the "Logan City Council Administration Centre and contiguous Council properties", but it was subsequently enlarged with land excised from both Woodridge and Kingston.

Kingston Centre for Continuing Secondary Education opened on 4 February 1991.

All Saints' Anglican Church at 52 Redford Street (27.6537°S 153.1091°E) closed circa 1995.

The Centre Education Programme opened on 1 July 1997.

Groves Christian College opened in 1999. It opened its Maryfields primary campus on 21 January 2005.

== Demographics ==
In the 2016 census, the suburb of Kingston had a population of 10,539 people, with Aboriginal and Torres Strait Islander people making up 5.9% of the population. 55.4% of people were born in Australia, followed by New Zealand 9.2%, Samoa 2.1%, England 2.1%, Myanmar 1.7%, and Afghanistan 1.4%. 64.0% of people spoke only English at home and other languages spoken at home included Samoan 4.1%, Karen 2.2%, Hindi 1.2%, Hazaraghi 1.1%, and Arabic 1.1%. T

he most common stated responses for religion were, again, No Religion 25.4% and Catholic 14.3%. The median age was 31 years, 7 years below the national median of 38.

In the 2021 census, the suburb of Kingston had a population of 10,506 people.

== Kingston toxic waste ==
The Mount Taylor Gold mine was located on the corner of Queens Road and Kingston Road. It operated from 1898 to 1955.

The Kingston toxic waste story began in 1931 when cyanide and other toxins such as acid waste used in the Mount Taylor gold refining process were disposed of around the mine site. When the mine closed in 1955, the Albert Shire Council started to allow used recycled oil processing wastes to be dumped into a sludge pit on the site; this practice continued until 1967. From 1968 to 1973 the main open-cut pit was used as a domestic and industrial waste tip. In 1968 the council required the sludge pit to be filled as a condition of the land being divided for a residential subdivision. Workers simply moved the displaced sludge and re-dumped it into the open-cut pit.

In 1982, after the Logan Council took over the area, it discovered high levels of acid in the soil.

In September 1986 residents, in the Diamond street area of Kingston, started to notice black sludge beginning to ooze from the ground and seep into their gardens and began to complain of health problems to the Logan Council. By April 1987 the council was warning people to avoid the sludge. Surrounding soils and ground-water were also found to be contaminated. The ooze was corrosive to clothes and skin. Removal was met with re-occurrence within months.

In May 1987, frustrated with the council inaction, the residents of Kingston formed an organisation called RATS (Residents Against Toxic Substances). Because of increased leukaemia and other diseases in Kingston, they condemned the council and demanded action. Kingston residents could not afford a costly civil action so they went to the media and began a self-funded civic action.

It took four years of fighting the council and local governments for the residents of Kingston to be vindicated when the Minister for Emergency Services, Terry Mackenroth, ordered a review of all scientific and medical evidence, offered full health tests for residents and announced the Wayne Goss government would rehabilitate the site and pay for families to be moved away. Envirotest released a revised report in May 1990.

Eventually the state government resumed 46 properties and rehabilitated the area completing 1991, which is known as Kingston Park. The people of Kingston were moved on, Mount Taylor was sealed and landscaped, but no compensation came for residents who reported illnesses and deaths (Some place the figure at six deaths due to leukemia). The final medical report found no evidence of "a major toxic hazard" in Kingston but recognised the "stress on a number of residents because of the uncertainty". Kingston residents finally could not prove that dumped toxic chemicals caused leukaemia or any other disease.

As of 2000, the total cost of this operation, including relocating infrastructure, the engineering required to seal the site and ongoing monitoring, was approximately $8 million. Although the Mount Taylor site was capped, sealed and vented in 1991, no toxic waste was removed. Some former residents believe there is still a toxic hazard risk in the future as a result.

The Mount Taylor Parklands were opened on 19 October 1991.

== Heritage listings ==
Kingston has two heritage-listed sites: Kingston Pioneer Cemetery (Bega Road) and Mayes Cottage (36 Mawarra Street). The graves of Charles and Harriett Kingston, after whom the suburb is named, are found in the cemetery, while Mayes Cottage is one of the earliest surviving houses in the town.

== Transport ==
Kingston railway station provides access to regular Queensland Rail City network services to Brisbane and Beenleigh. The Logan Motorway passes through the south of Kingston but has no entrance or exit points to the suburb.

== Education ==
Kingston State School is a government primary (Prep–6) school for boys and girls at 50 Juers Street (27.6594°S 153.1115°E). In 2022, the school had an enrolment of 524 students with 43 teachers (39 full-time equivalent) and 33 non-teaching staff (20 full-time equivalent). It includes a special education program.

Groves Christian College is a private primary and secondary (Prep–12) school for boys and girls at 70 Laughlin Street (27.6609°S 153.1099°E). It has its Maryfield primary (4–6) campus at Velorum Drive (27.6604°S 153.0988°E). In 2017, the school had an enrolment of 1,391 students with 103 teachers (89 full-time equivalent) and 63 non-teaching staff (56 full-time equivalent).

Kingston State College is a government secondary (7–12) school for boys and girls at 62–84 Bega Road (27.6641°S 153.1121°E). In 2017, the school had an enrolment of 876 students with 94 teachers (82 full-time equivalent) and 45 non-teaching staff (34 full-time equivalent). It includes a special education program.

The Centre Education Programme is a Catholic secondary (7–12) school for boys and girls at 108 Mudgee Street (27.6679°S 153.1103°E). In 2017, the school had an enrolment of 118 students with 15 teachers (10 full-time equivalent) and 14 non-teaching staff (9 full-time equivalent).

YMCA Vocational School is a private secondary (7–10) facility of YMCA Vocational School at 41–45 Mary Street for boys and girls at 53 Mary Street (27.6571°S 153.1225°E). In 2017, the school had an enrolment of 327 students with 21 teachers (19 full-time equivalent) and 35 non-teaching staff.

Kingston Centre for Continuing Secondary Education is a secondary (9–12) Centre for Continuing Secondary Education at 62–84 Bega Road (27.6641°S 153.1121°E).
