= Lachlan Power =

Australian YouTuber, professional gamer and internet personality (born 1995)

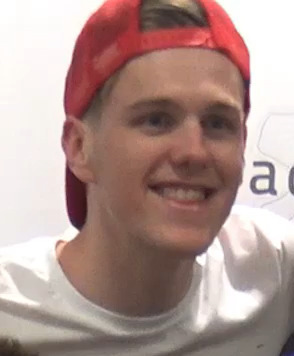
- Power in 2016
- Born: Lachlan Ross Power; 25 August 1995 (age 31); Brisbane, Queensland, Australia
- Other name: CraftBattleDuty
- Occupations: YouTuber; live streamer
- Parent: Darren Power (father)

YouTube information
- Channel: Lachlan
- Years active: 2013–present
- Genres: Gaming; vlog
- Subscribers: 18.1 million (combined)
- Views: 7.1 billion (combined)
- Last updated: 20 June 2026

Lachlan Ross Power (born 25 August 1995), also known mononymously as Lachlan, is an Australian YouTuber, professional gamer, and internet personality known primarily for his video game commentaries of Fortnite Battle Royale. He is the founder of lifestyle brand and gaming organization PWR.

In 2013, Power registered his YouTube account under the name CraftBattleDuty and primarily posted video game commentaries of Minecraft, Battlefield, and Call of Duty. His channel experienced substantial growth in popularity when he began posting videos of Fortnite in 2017. In January 2019, his channel reached 10 million subscribers, becoming the first Australian gaming content creator to hit that milestone. As of March 2024, the channel had reached over 15 million subscribers and 5 billion video views, ranking as the seventh most-subscribed and fifth most-viewed channel on the platform from Australia.

== Early life ==
Lachlan "Lachy" Power was born on the 25th of August 1995, in Brisbane, Queensland, and grew up in Shailer Park, Queensland. His mother, Lynne, is a bank manager and his father Darren Power is a local politician, who served as the mayor of Logan City from 2020 to 2024. Power has three siblings.

== Career ==
Power registered the "CraftBattleDuty" YouTube channel on 19 March 2013. His early content primarily featured video game commentaries of Minecraft, Battlefield and Call of Duty; his channel name comes from a concatenation of these three games. He was a member of the Minecraft group the Pack along with JeromeASF, PrestonPlayz, Vikkstar123, Woofless, and Bajan Canadian. His channel experienced substantial growth in popularity when he began playing Fortnite Battle Royale in 2017.

In January 2019, his channel reached 10 million subscribers, becoming the first Australian gaming content creator to hit that milestone. In October 2019, during Fortnite's season-ending live event "The End", Power's stream on YouTube peaked at 198,976 concurrent viewers. On 29 October 2019, it was announced that Power had signed a deal with YouTube to stream exclusively on that platform; he had previously also streamed on Twitch.

In June 2020, Power launched a professional esports Fortnite team based in Queensland, Australia, called PWR, which later expanded to being a gaming, entertainment, and apparel brand. He had previously launched a merchandise brand, Power by Lachlan, in 2018. In October 2020, Power received his own Fortnite outfit as part of the Fortnite Icon Series. In 2021, Power signed to Creative Artists Agency (CAA).

== Charitable work ==
In January 2019, Power participated in the charity Pro–Am event at the Australian Open Fortnite Summer Smash. He partnered with actor Liam McIntyre at the Fortnite World Cup Pro-Am in July 2019 and finished in 18th place; $20,000 donated to charity. In October 2019, Power donated $15,000 to Team Trees, a fundraising drive taking action against deforestation by pledging to plant one tree for every dollar donated. In January 2020, Power did a charity live stream to raise money for the ongoing Australian bushfire relief effort and raised $34,849, which included a donation of $30,000 from streamer Ninja. That month, he partnered with Epic Games to raise awareness for the International Committee of the Red Cross (ICRC) by being one of the first to play the new Fortnite game mode "Liferun", where players take part in life-saving missions similar to those of the ICRC. In February 2020, Power won the second edition of the Fortnite Summer Smash Pro-Am, along with fellow Australian YouTuber Fresh and musician Enschway, with $30,000 being donated to charities of their choice.

== Filmography ==
Film roles
Year	Title	Role	Notes	Ref.
2021	Back to the Outback	Dave	Voice role	

== Awards and nominations ==
Year	Award	Category	Result	Ref.
2019	Kids' Choice Awards	Favourite Aussie/Kiwi Content Creator	Won	
