= Groves Christian College =

School in Logan City, Australia

Location
- 70 Laughlin Street (Campus 1); 12 Velorum Drive (Campus 2); Kingston, Queensland; Australia; 27.661°S 153.11°E

Information
- Type: Private Christian School
- Motto: Educating for Eternity
- Established: 1999
- Principal: Allan Weir (Executive Principal)
- Grades: Kindy–Year 12
- Enrolment: 1500+
- Colours: Navy, red, yellow, orange, teal

Groves Christian College is a coeducational independent Christian school based in the suburb of Kingston in the local government area of Logan City, south of the Brisbane metropolitan area in Queensland, Australia. The college consists of two school campuses, with the main campus located on Laughlin Street (70 Laughlin St,) which accommodates students in the Foundation Phase (Kindy–Year 2), Middle Phase (Years 7–9) and Senior Phase (Years 10–12). A second campus is located on Velorum Drive (12 Velorum Drive) which accommodates students in the Intermediate Phase (Years 3–6). Additionally, the college operates an Early Learning Centre at 44 Laughlin Street.

== History ==
Groves Christian College initially opened in 1999 as the founding member school of Christian Community Ministries Limited, a ministry which now operates numerous Christian schools in Queensland, New South Wales and South Australia. Groves has been working with families to make a values based, Christian education available to all who desire it by encouraging the spiritual, intellectual, physical, social, ethical, aesthetic and emotional development of the students at the College. Groves was named in honour of English Protestant missionary, Anthony Norris Groves (1 February 1795 – 20 May 1853). He is remembered for his faithful approach to mission work and empowerment of the local people where he launched the first Protestant mission to Arabic-speaking Muslims in Baghdad, Iraq and later in southern India.

== Sporting houses ==
Groves Christian College consists of four sporting houses, all of which are named in reference to Christian missionaries:

- Aylward, named in reference to Gladys Aylward (1902–1970), an English-born evangelical missionary who led more than 100 orphans to safety during the Second Sino-Japanese War in 1938, many of whom were converted to Christianity through her evangelism.
- Carmichael, named in reference to Amy Carmichael (1867–1951), an Irish-born Protestant Christian missionary who served in India for 55 years and founded the Dohnavur Fellowship.
- Elliot, named in reference to Philip James Elliot (1927–1956), a US-born evangelical Christian missionary who was one of five missionaries killed during their involvement in Operation Auca, an attempted mission to bring Christianity to the Huaorani people of the Amazon rainforest in Ecuador.
- Livingstone, named in reference to David Livingstone (1813–1873), a Scottish-born pioneer Christian missionary with the London Missionary Society, an explorer in Africa and one of the most noteworthy British heroes of the Victorian era.
