= Kay Elson =

Australian politician

Member of the Australian Parliament for Forde
- In office 2 March 1996 – 17 October 2007
- Preceded by: Mary Crawford
- Succeeded by: Brett Raguse

Personal details
- Born: 25 January 1947 (age 79) Brisbane, Queensland, Australia
- Party: Liberal Party of Australia
- Occupation: Financial consultant

Kay Selma Elson (born 25 January 1947) is an Australian politician who was a Liberal Member of the Australian House of Representatives from March 1996 until her retirement in November 2007. Kay represented the Division of Forde, Queensland. She was born in Brisbane, Queensland, and was a special events co-ordinator for a handicapped association, a shop proprietor and a financial consultant before entering politics. Elson is married to David, a beekeeper and bush poet. Elson has eight children, 24 grandchildren and four great-grandchildren.

Elson had contested a total of four Queensland state elections prior to her candidacy for federal parliament. She ran for Woodridge in 1983 as a Nationals candidate, Springwood in 1986 as an independent candidate, and Albert and Broadwater in 1989 and 1992 respectively as a Liberal Party candidate. She ran as "Elson, Selma Kay" for the 1983 election.

Elson was preselected as the Liberal candidate in Forde for the 1996 election. The seat was originally a safe Labor seat, but a redistribution added some Liberal-friendly territory in the Scenic Rim, which all but erased Labor's majority. Elson defeated Labor incumbent Mary Crawford on a nine-percent swing, turning Forde into a safe Liberal seat in one stroke. Her victory was part of Labor's near-total collapse in Queensland; Labor was cut down to only two seats there.

In October 2006, Kay Elson announced that she would not be seeking a fifth term and retired at the 2007 Election. By this time, she had built up her majority to 12 percent. However, the seat was lost to Labor on a 14-point swing, making it one of the safest Coalition seats to be gained by Labor.

Parliament of Australia
Preceded by Mary Crawford	Member for Forde; 1996–2007	Succeeded by Brett Raguse
