= Brett Raguse =

Australian politician (born 1960)

Member of the Australian Parliament for Forde
- In office 24 November 2007 – 21 August 2010
- Preceded by: Kay Elson
- Succeeded by: Bert van Manen

Personal details
- Born: 24 March 1960 (age 66) Brisbane, Queensland, Australia
- Party: Independent (since 2016)
- Other political affiliations: Labor (until 2016)
- Education: Griffith University
- Occupation: Teacher, political advisor

Brett Blair Raguse (born 24 March 1960) is an Australian former politician. He was a member of the House of Representatives from 2007 to 2010, representing the Division of Forde for the Australian Labor Party (ALP).

== Early life ==
Raguse was born in Brisbane, Queensland. His unwed 17-year-old mother Denise gave him up for adoption at birth. Prior to entering politics he worked as a compositor, schoolteacher and director of a TAFE college.

== Politics ==
Raguse gained Labor pre-selection to contest the normally safe Liberal seat of Forde at the 2007 federal election. A position previously held by retiring Liberal Kay Elson. He won an unexpected 14% swing on election day, easily defeating new Liberal candidate Wendy Creighton in what was generally viewed as one of the main upset results of the election. He lost his seat in the 2010 federal election to the LNP candidate Bert van Manen.

In March 2015, Raguse confirmed he would be a candidate for mayor of Logan City in the Queensland local government elections set for 19 March 2016. He placed 2nd behind incumbent Luke Smith.

In 2016, Raguse resigned his Labor party membership to run for Mayor as an independent.

In 2020, Raguse again ran for mayor and placed 2nd to new Mayor Darren Power.

In 2024, Raguse ran a 3rd time for Logan city Mayor.

Parliament of Australia
Preceded by Kay Elson	Member for Forde; 2007–2010	Succeeded by Bert van Manen
