= Mary Crawford (politician) =

Australian politician

The Honourable Mary Crawford AM
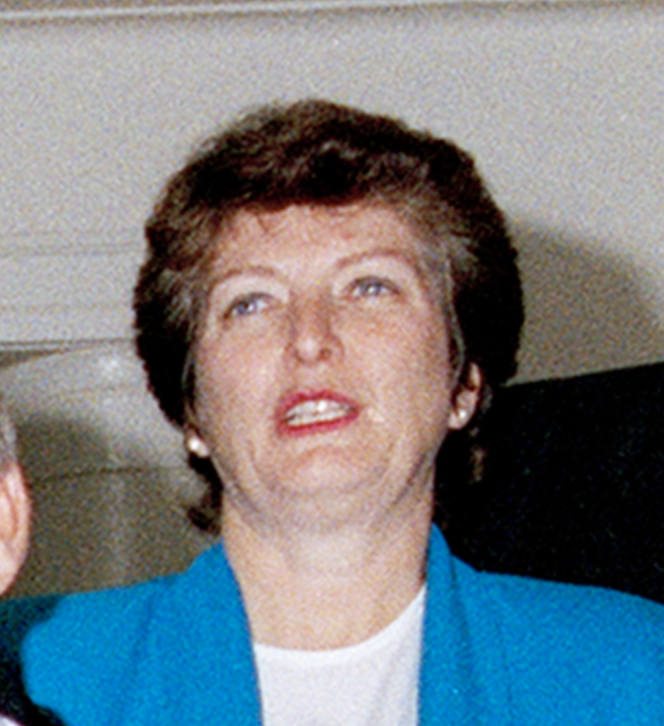

Member of the Australian Parliament for Forde
- In office 11 July 1987 – 2 March 1996
- Preceded by: David Watson
- Succeeded by: Kay Elson

Personal details
- Born: 12 April 1947 (age 79) Toowoomba, Queensland
- Party: Australian Labor Party
- Education: University of Queensland
- Occupation: Teacher

Mary Catherine Crawford AM (born 12 April 1947) is a former Australian politician. Born in Toowoomba, Queensland, she was educated at the University of Queensland before becoming a teacher. In 1987, she was elected to the Australian House of Representatives as the Labor member for Forde. On 25 March 1994 she was appointed Parliamentary Secretary to the Minister for Housing and Regional Development, a position she held until the defeat of the Keating Government in the 1996 election, in which Crawford lost her seat. Crawford had previously held her seat with a fairly safe majority of 8.6 percent. However, a redistribution ahead of the election pushed Forde into some rural, conservative-leaning territory in the Scenic Rim. This wiped out Crawford's majority, reducing it to an extremely marginal 0.1 percent. Believing that this made Forde difficult—if not impossible—to hold, Crawford tried to transfer to the friendlier seat of Rankin, but was rebuffed by the party's organisational wing. She was defeated by Liberal Kay Elson on a nine-percent swing.

Crawford was made a Member of the Order of Australia in the 2020 Australia Day Honours for "significant service to women, and to the people and Parliament of Australia."

She received a PhD from Queensland University of Technology (QUT) in 2008, focusing on women and the Australian Parliament. She also is a member of the QUT Pathways to Politics for Women program. In 2025 she was awarded an honorary Doctor of the University by QUT.

Parliament of Australia
| Preceded by David Watson | Member for Forde; 1987–1996 | Succeeded by Kay Elson |
