= Bert van Manen =

Australian politician

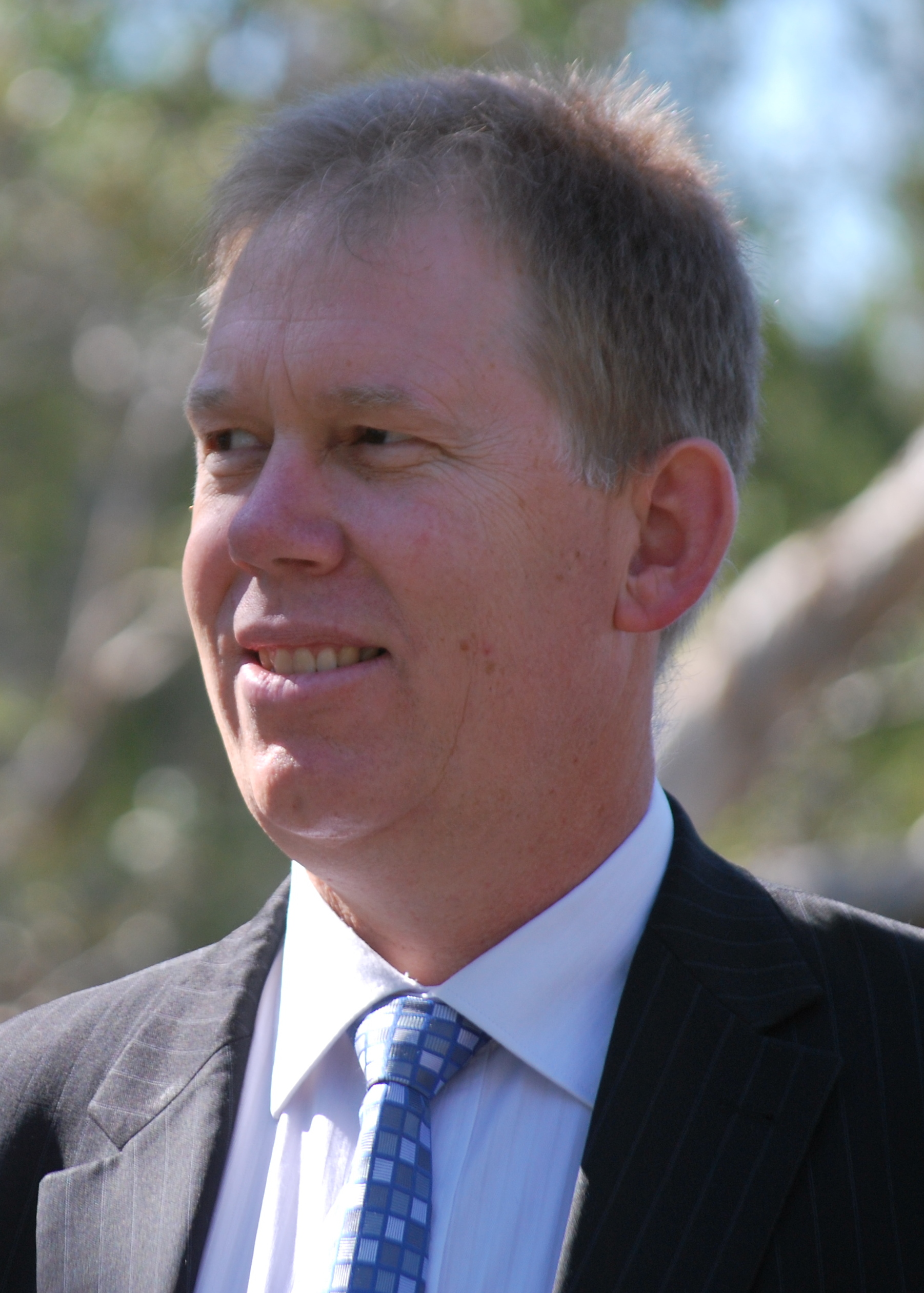

Chief Opposition Whip in the House of Representatives
- In office 26 July 2022 – 3 May 2025
- Leader: Peter Dutton
- Preceded by: Chris Hayes

Chief Government Whip in the House of Representatives
- In office 2 July 2019 – 11 April 2022
- Prime Minister: Scott Morrison
- Preceded by: Nola Marino

Liberal Party Chief Whip in the House of Representatives
- In office 2 July 2019 – 3 May 2025
- Prime Minister: Scott Morrison; Peter Dutton
- Preceded by: Nola Marino

Member of the Australian Parliament for Forde
- In office 21 August 2010 – 3 May 2025
- Preceded by: Brett Raguse
- Succeeded by: Rowan Holzberger

Personal details
- Born: Albertus Johannes van Manen; 24 March 1965 (age 61) Brisbane, Queensland, Australia
- Party: Liberal National (state); Liberal (federal)
- Other political affiliations: Family First
- Spouse: Judi van Manen (m. 1987)
- Children: 2
- Education: Waterford Primary School; Waterford West Primary School; Kingston State High School
- Occupation: Financial Advisor; Politician
- Website: Official website

Albertus Johannes "Bert" van Manen (born 24 March 1965) is an Australian former politician who represented the Division of Forde in the House of Representatives from 2010 to 2025. He is a member of the Liberal National Party of Queensland and sat with the Liberal Party in federal parliament. He was the party's chief whip in the House of Representatives from July 2019 until May 2025.

== Early life ==
Bert Van Manen was born in Brisbane, Queensland, to Dutch immigrants. His father was a ceramic tiler. His family moved to Waterford when he was young. He was educated at Kingston, Waterford and Waterford West primary schools and at Kingston State High.

In 1987 he married Judi, and they have two sons.

Bert Van Manen was employed as a bank officer for 15 years, from 1983 to 1998, before running his own business as a financial advisor from 1999 to 2010.

In 2007 Van Manen co-founded Vangrove Financial Planning with Andrew Cosgrove. He resigned as director in April 2012 but retained a 50% ownership; one month later KPMG administrators were called in when the firm collapsed owing creditors $1.5 million.

Van Manen is on the board of the Dunamis International College of Bible Ministries, revealed in his maiden speech.

== Political career ==
In 2007, Bert Van Manen was the Family First Party candidate in the seat of Rankin. He received 3.53% of the primary vote in that election.

In the 2010 federal election, van Manen won the Division of Forde from the Australian Labor Party (ALP) incumbent Brett Raguse. He retained his seat at the 2013 federal election, 2016 federal election, 2019 federal election, and 2022 federal election.

In August 2016 he was appointed to the position of Government Whip. He has served as a Member of the Joint Statutory Committee on Law Enforcement; Joint Standing Committee on Law Enforcement; House of Representatives Standing Committee on Law Enforcement and House of Representatives Select Committee on Law Enforcement.

He was endorsed by the evangelical Christian Dunamis Church, which provided church volunteers to aid his election campaign with "booth work, letterbox drops and many other things."

In 2017, the Division of Forde voted "Yes" in the Australian Marriage Law Postal Survey, with 61% in support of same-sex marriage. Van Manen had campaigned against same-sex marriage, and abstained from the parliamentary vote.

In January 2018, it was reported that several changes to van Manen's Wikipedia page that included deleting references to his failed business, Vangrove Financial Planning, were traced to parliamentary IP addresses. A spokesperson for Bert Van Manen described the edits as having been "well-meaning."

Journalist and former political staffer Niki Savva speculates in her book Plots and Prayers that van Manen may have been a key instrument in the 2018 leadership spill which removed Malcolm Turnbull as Prime Minister, as Van Manen was deputy Whip and a part of the Morrison Bible Group. Van Manen's was one of six crucial votes that determined Scott Morrison to be the new leader.

On 2 July 2019, following the 2019 federal election, van Manen replaced Nola Marino as Chief Government Whip in the House of Representatives.

In 2019 Bert Van Manen secured a $92,000 grant for tennis courts upgrades at Club Beenleigh from the Federal Government’s Community Development Grants Programme. The tennis club's vice president at the time was Mark Ellis, an ex-police officer and member of the infamous Pinkenba Six.

Van Manen is a member of the centre-right faction of the Liberal Party.

He lost his seat to Rowan Holzberger at the 2025 federal election.

=== Electoral history ===
House of Representatives
Election year	Electorate	Party	Votes	FP%	+/-	2PP%	+/-	Result
2007	Rankin	Family First	2,827	3.53	▼1.59	-		Fourth
2010	Forde	Liberal National	30,967	44.08	▲0.01	51.63	▲4.99	First
2013	Forde	Liberal National	32,271	42.54	▼1.54	54.38	▲2.75	First
2016	Forde	Liberal National	34,096	40.63	▼1.91	50.63	▼3.75	First
2019	Forde	Liberal National	39,819	43.50	▲2.87	58.60	▲7.97	First
2022	Forde	Liberal National	34,920	36.90	▼6.60	54.20	▼4.40	First
2025	Forde	Liberal National	33,023	30.71	▼6.20	48.23	▼6.00	Second

Parliament of Australia
Preceded by Brett Raguse	Member for Forde; 2010–2025	Succeeded by Rowan Holzberger
