= Grant Musgrove =

Australian politician

Member of the Queensland Legislative Assembly for Springwood
- In office 13 June 1998 – 17 February 2001
- Preceded by: Luke Woolmer
- Succeeded by: Barbara Stone

Personal details
- Born: Grant Steven Musgrove; 28 March 1968 (age 58) Victoria, Australia
- Party: Labor
- Other political affiliations: Labor
- Education: Griffith University
- Occupation: Policy advisor

Grant Steven Musgrove (born 28 March 1968) is a former Australian politician. He was the member for Springwood in the Legislative Assembly of Queensland from 1998 to 2001, representing the Labor Party. He has held a number of additional roles, such as senior public servant, university advisor, and chief executive officer of the Australian Council of Recycling.

At Griffith University, Musgrove completed a Bachelor of Commerce, majoring in economics, and a Bachelor of Science, (Australian Environmental Studies) majoring in Environmental Planning. He started his career as policy officer in the Department of Premier and Cabinet in 1992. In 1996, he resigned from the public service to run for a seat in parliament.

In 1998, Musgrove was elected as the Labor member for Springwood. Musgrove was appointed as Chair of the Queensland Innovation Council (developing the Queensland Innovation Strategy), the Queensland Public Works Committee, Griffith University Council, member of numerous Ministerial advisory committees and as chair and member of several Budget Estimates Committees.

Musgrove resigned from the Labor Party in December 2000, after he admitted to the Shepherdson Inquiry into electoral fraud that he "probably" witnessed an enrolment that was used was used for the purposes of branch stacking. He did not recontest his seat in Parliament.

Musgrove went on to work as a government relations consultant then as Senior Manager and Advisor at Griffith University. He served on number of boards, councils, expert government committees and advisory boards in relation to resource recovery and resource efficiency, and is a Member of the Australian Institute of Company Directors.

Parliament of Queensland
Preceded by Luke Woolmer	Member for Springwood; 1998–2001	Succeeded by Barbara Stone
