= John Grant (Queensland politician) =

Australian politician

Member of the Queensland Legislative Assembly for Springwood
- In office 24 March 2012 – 31 January 2015
- Preceded by: Barbara Stone
- Succeeded by: Mick de Brenni

Personal details
- Born: John Bramwell Grant; 1954 (age 71–72) Brisbane, Queensland, Australia
- Party: Liberal National Party of Queensland
- Other political affiliations: Independent
- Occupation: Company director

John Bramwell Grant (born 1954) is an Australian politician. He was a Liberal National Party member of the Legislative Assembly of Queensland from 2012 to 2015, representing the electorate of Springwood.

Grant was born in Brisbane, and operated his own building design and drafting company before entering politics. He was elected to the Logan City council in 1997, and was deputy mayor from 2004 to 2008. He was narrowly defeated at the 2008 council elections by Aidan McLindon, but regained his council seat in 2009 upon McLindon's election to parliament. He contested Woodridge as an independent at the 2001 state election, polling 10.9% of the vote.

Grant joined the Liberal National Party in October 2010, citing dissatisfaction with the Labor government's water policy. He subsequently won LNP preselection to contest the state seat of Springwood, held by four-term Labor MLA Barbara Stone, at the 2012 state election. The seat had changed parties with each change of government since its inception in 1986. He went on to win the seat with a swing of more than 15 points as part of the LNP's landslide victory. Grant was appointed to the Transport, Housing and Local Government Committee upon his election.

He was defeated by Labor candidate Mick de Brenni in the LNP defeat at the 2015 state election.

Parliament of Queensland
Preceded by Barbara Stone	Member for Springwood; 2012–2015	Succeeded by Mick de Brenni
