= Mayes Cottage =

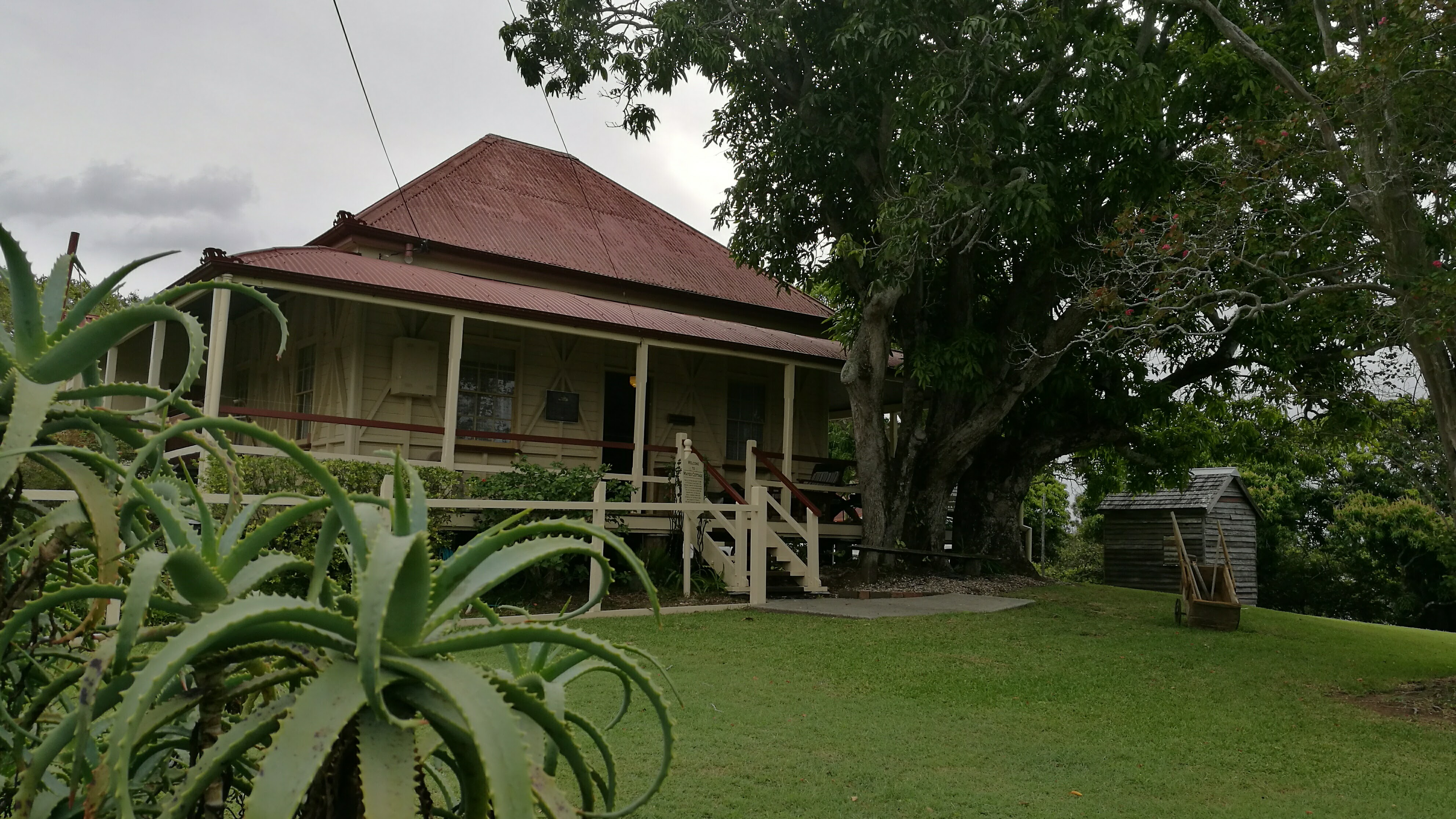
- Mayes Cottage, 2017

- Location within Queensland
- 27.6524°S 153.1165°E
- Location: 20 Mawarra Street, Kingston, City of Logan, Queensland, Australia

History
- Design period: 1870s–1890s (late 19th century)
- Built: 1887
- Built for: Mayes Family Home

Site notes
- Owner: Logan City Council

Queensland Heritage Register
- Official name: Mayes Cottage, Pleasant Place
- Type: state heritage (built)
- Designated: 21 October 1992
- Reference no.: 600662
- Significant period: 1872–1906 (fabric); 1870s–1945 (historical)
- Significant components: kitchen/kitchen house, shed – milking, out building/s, farmhouse

Mayes Cottage is a nineteenth century, heritage-listed house museum located at 20 Mawarra Street, Kingston, City of Logan, Queensland, Australia. Originally called Pleasant Place, it was built in 1887 by the Mayes Family. It was added to the Queensland Heritage Register on 21 October 1992.

Mayes Cottage is maintained by Logan City Council and staffed by volunteers. It is open to the public for free and tours are available.

== History ==
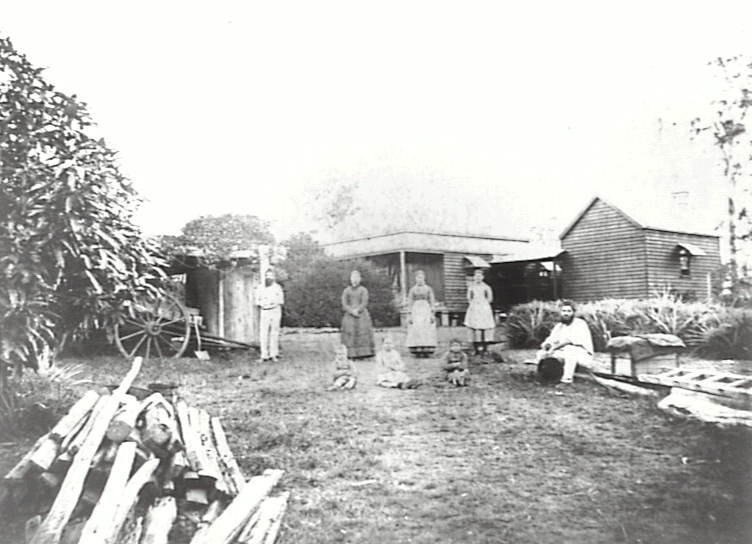
Mayes Cottage c. 1887

Mayes Cottage is a small one storeyed timber dwelling on a large property containing several outbuildings. It was constructed as the family home of local pioneer, John Mayes in 1887, replacing an earlier house, reused as a store.

John and Emily Mayes and their two small children, Joshua and Ruth, arrived in Brisbane from England aboard the SS Indus in 1871. They had another 5 children. The first two children both died prematurely. Ruth was only 12 years old and drowned in the well in 1882. Joshua contracted typhoid fever in his 21st year of life, in 1887.

In June 1873, John took up 321 acres (130 ha) of land in the Kingston area, then known as Scrubby Creek. When they arrived at what was to become Kingston, the Mayes family lived in a tent on the property, but in 1872 a small timber slab hut was constructed. The Mayes' lease was subject to conditions requiring improvements under the provisions of the Crown Lands Alienation Act (1868). Another local pioneering family, the Kingstons, settled in the district in 1872, under the same leasing requirements.

By 1877, when a property inspection was undertaken to ascertain whether the Mayes family were honouring their lease requirements, improvements to the property were reported. These included the erection of the 1872 hut, described as a two roomed house with bark roof, along with outbuildings including a kitchen slab with bark roof, and a water hole. A well was built near an already established water-hole popular with the local aboriginal community on the Kingston Road border of the house, providing water for the house prior to the construction of tanks. One of the daughters of John and Emily, Ruth, was drowned in the well. Extensive fencing and clearing of the land was evident in the 1877 inspection, orange trees were planted and cattle had been introduced. The original entrance to the property was via a sliprail on the Kingston Rd fence.

The Mayes family were supported principally by timber getting on the property, providing timber for the pit props in the Ipswich mines, firewood, sleepers, fence posts and other undressed timber products. In 1886–1887 the Mayes constructed a new timber house "Pleasant Place" adjacent to the earlier hut, which they also retained for storage (later it became the garage for the family car). Early photographs of Pleasant Place show a single storeyed timber building with exposed external framing, a pyramidal roof and extensive verandahs. Originally, as well as an outdoor oven to the west of the kitchen, an open fire and brick chimney were placed at the southern end of the kitchen providing limited heating facilities. This was removed from the kitchen and replaced by a window in the 1930s.

John Mayes applied to purchase the property on 30 January 1883, and a Deed of Grant was issued on 7 July that year. The following year an application was made by Mayes for a refund for land that had been resumed by the railway, which was due to open in 1885, reducing his property to 313 acres (127 ha) and 38 perches (960 m^{2}).

During the 1880s and 90s, the family grew a wide variety of fruit trees around the house, including mangoes, pineapples, citrus fruit, guavas and persimmons. About 20 head of cattle were introduced to the property during the 1890s. By about 1906 a milking yard was installed when J. Mayes, either the elderly John or his son Josiah, bought shares in the newly formed Kingston Cooperative Dairy Company.

When John Mayes died on 10 June 1908, Emily remarried John's brother, Richard, with whom she moved to Mooloolah in 1913. Josiah and his wife, Daisy, moved to Pleasant Place in 1913, and the transfer of property to Josiah's name was completed in 1918. Cream from the dairy cattle at Pleasant Place was taken to the Dairy Co-op to be sold, though the property was not really fertile enough to support dairy cows, and timber getting and fruit growing continued as the main sources of income. Josiah was a registered bee-keeper and 120 hives were introduced to the northern slope of the property.

By 1912 the Kingston area was beginning to develop, with closer settlement and the opening of a local school and, later the Kingston Hall, used for dances and community meetings.

In 1922, a dairy was constructed at Pleasant Place, and the original slab house, whose shingle roof was re-used for the new dairy, was itself re-roofed with galvanised iron, in accordance with the Dairy Produce Act of Queensland (1904), pertaining to dairy storage sheds. Milking was conducted in the milking yards, under a fig tree planted for shading the area.

During the 1930s and 40s, several alterations to various outbuildings were made, including the extension of the feed shed, the construction of a storage shed near the milking yard, the removal of an outdoor oven from the kitchen yard and the widening and enclosure of the walkway between the kitchen and the house. Electricity was connected to the house in 1937, and a Chevrolet was purchased in about 1935, thereby allowing the removal of the buggy shelter which was replaced by a laundry. Other changes to the property in the early 1940s included the planting of a row of oleanders by Josiah's son, Richard for his wife and the construction of a bush house by Josiah's daughter, Evelyn.

The Mayes family discontinued dairying in 1945, and turned the dairy into a storage area for a honey extractor. By the mid-1950s, when Josiah was not able to maintain or work the farm, the family sold off the land for suburban development, leaving only ten acres around the house.

In 1974 the Queensland Housing Commission resumed most of the family property and after Daisy and Josiah's deaths, the Commission sought to acquire the house too. A local action group lobbied to save the historic property, which was listed by the National Trust of Australia and gazetted as a reserve for Park and Recreation in June 1979. The house is now surrounded by 2 acres (0.81 ha) of land.

== Description ==
Mayes Cottage is a small one-storeyed timber building on a large block on Mawarra St, Kingston, which features a variety of outbuildings and established vegetation. The cottage is situated on the highest point of the block, with land gently sloping away to the north and east, providing the house with panoramic views of the surrounding area.

Mayes Cottage is a timber building, raised on sawn timber stumps and encircled by a verandah on three sides. The house and kitchen block have discrete roofs of corrugated galvanised iron, a high pitched pyramidal section over the house with a simple curved verandah awning; and a gabled roof over the kitchen wing. These parts are linked with an enclosed walkway, roofed with curved corrugated iron. The single skinned external walls of the main house have exposed diagonally braced timber framing, and are lined with horizontal boards. The verandah awning is supported on stop chamfered square timber columns, with square sectioned timber balustrade handrail and midrail.

A centrally located entrance door on the eastern facade, is accessed via a small open tread timber stair onto the verandah. The entrance is flanked by two timber framed window openings, housing sash windows of six panes with fine mullions and simple framing.

Internally, Mayes Cottage consists of four major rooms with additional rooms added to the verandah space of the western side of the building. Timber boarding is used throughout the cottage for flooring and internal partitioning, with beaded boards used to line the ceiling. Throughout the cottage there are simple moulded four panelled timber doors. The walkway joining the main house to the kitchen wing is enclosed with casement windows, glazed with coloured and clear arctic glass.

The kitchen wing is a simple rectangular building, clad with horizontal timber boards. Curved corrugated iron window awnings protect the windows, and a corrugated iron oven recess is attached to the northern end of the kitchen. This section is internally lined with v-jointed boards, raked at the junction between ceiling and wall.

The property houses several outbuildings and a substantial number of established trees and other vegetation. To the north of the house is a simple fully enclosed building, with a shingled roof, timber door and small unglazed window opening covered with a boarded timber shutter. To the west of this are the remains of the original home, consisting of framing elements and roofing. This structure is separated into two halves with a wall of timber slab construction. The northern half of the building has a raised platform, and a gabled roof covering, whilst the southern section has an adjoining skillion roof and an earth floor.

To the west of this are the milking yards, comprising a milking shed and remnants of a simple timber post and rail fence. The shed has an L-shaped plan, enclosed on the western end with the extending wing open to the north and framed with wide timber rough cut sections.

Several large mango trees, both on the property and adjacent to the north-eastern border, feature as early remnants.

== Heritage listing ==
Mayes Cottage was listed on the Queensland Heritage Register on 21 October 1992 having satisfied the following criteria.

The place is important in demonstrating the evolution or pattern of Queensland's history.

Mayes Cottage is one of the earliest surviving houses in the Kingston district. The property was built by the Mayes family for many years, and is able to provide evidence of the wide diversity of the family's small scale occupations including farming and fruit growing. The property retains the 1872 house, the 1887 house, and a dairy and feed shed all of which were built from timber grown on the selection.

The place demonstrates rare, uncommon or endangered aspects of Queensland's cultural heritage.

The house and outbuildings demonstrate the characteristics of early timber slab construction, exposed frame, single skin construction and sawn shingle roofing, all common for early home builders, but now rare.

The place is important in demonstrating the principal characteristics of a particular class of cultural places.

The house and outbuildings demonstrate the characteristics of early timber slab construction, exposed frame, single skin construction and sawn shingle roofing, all common for early home builders, but now rare.

The place is important because of its aesthetic significance.

The house and grounds have aesthetic value as part of a prominent and picturesque site, situated at the crest of a hill surrounded by open ground and mature trees.

The place has a special association with the life or work of a particular person, group or organisation of importance in Queensland's history.

Mayes Cottage is one of the earliest surviving houses in the Kingston district. The property was built by the Mayes family for many years, and is able to provide evidence of the wide diversity of the family's small scale occupations including farming and fruit growing. The property retains the 1872 house, the 1887 house, and a dairy and feed shed all of which were built from timber grown on the selection.
