= Division of Forde =

Australian federal electoral division

Coordinates: 27.762°S 153.181°E

Forde Australian House of Representatives Division
- Interactive map of boundaries since the 2019 federal election
- Created: 1984
- MP: Rowan Holzberger
- Party: Labor
- Namesake: Frank Forde
- Electors: 134,066 (2025)
- Area: 418 km^{2} (161.4 sq mi)
- Demographic: Outer Metropolitan

The Division of Forde is an Australian federal electoral division in Queensland. The current MP is Rowan Holzberger of the Labor Party.

== Geography ==
Since 1984, federal electoral division boundaries in Australia have been determined at redistributions by a redistribution committee appointed by the Australian Electoral Commission. Redistributions occur for the boundaries of divisions in a particular state, and they occur every seven years, or sooner if a state's representation entitlement changes or when divisions of a state are malapportioned.

The electorate covers outer northern parts of the City of Gold Coast and parts of the City of Logan.

== History ==
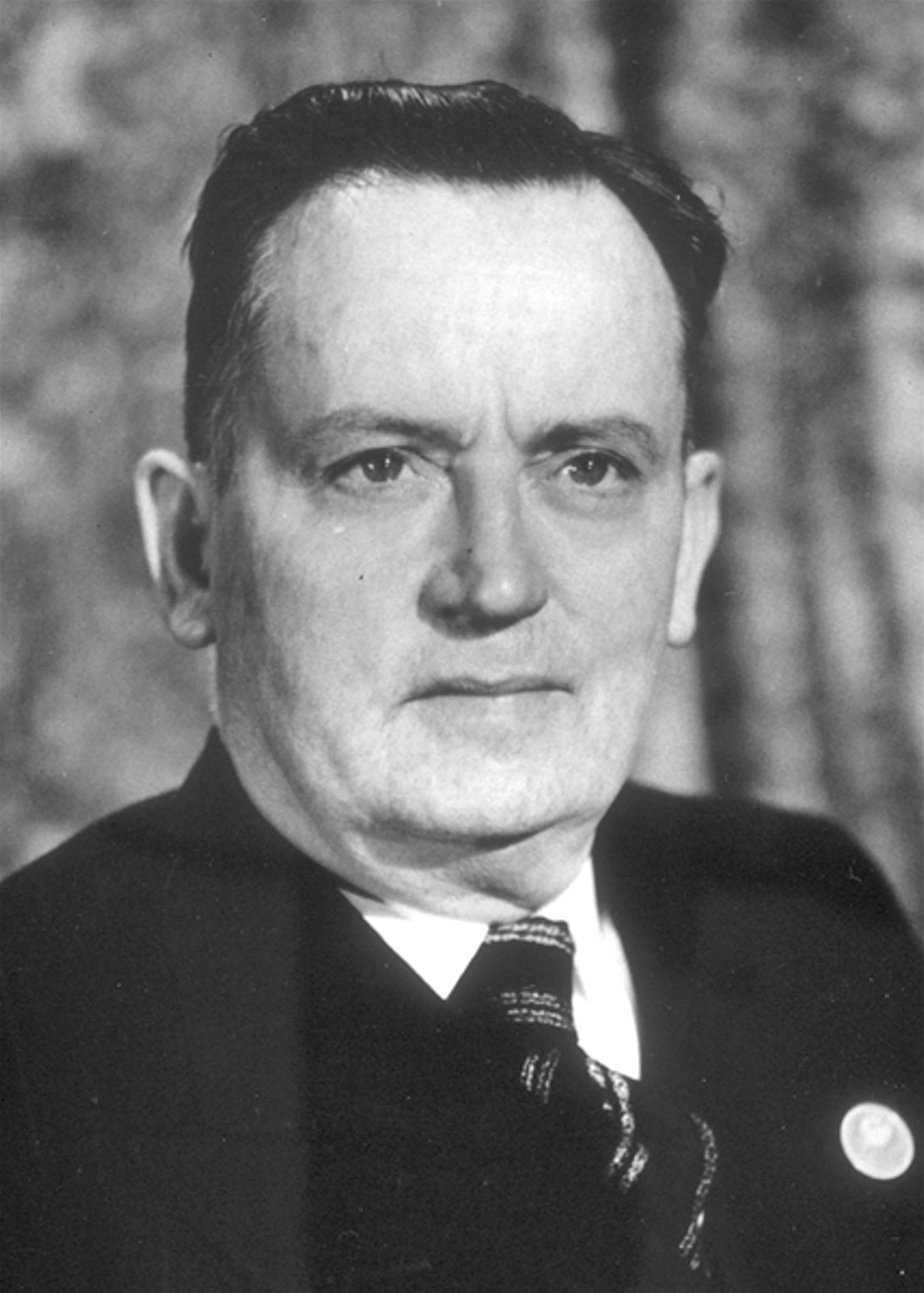
Frank Forde, the division's namesake

The division was created in 1984 and is named after Frank Forde, who was Prime Minister of Australia for seven days in 1945 following the death of John Curtin. When it was created it was a marginal seat in the southern suburbs of Brisbane, but it now has no territory in common with the original seat and is located in exurban and semi-rural areas south of the city, including Beenleigh and Loganlea.

It was a fairly safe seat for the Liberal Party after the 2004 election. Kay Elson announced that she would not re-contest her seat in the 2007 election. Wendy Creighton, a Boonah resident and editor of the local newspaper, the Fassifern Guardian, contested Forde as the Liberal candidate instead. She was defeated at the Federal election by Brett Raguse, the opposing Labor Party candidate, making Forde the safest Liberal Party seat to be claimed by the Labor Party at the 2007 election. The seat returned to the LNP with Bert van Manen in 2010. Incumbent van Manen then held on to the seat during the 2013, 2016, 2019 and 2022 elections.

Ahead of the 2016 federal election, ABC psephologist Antony Green listed the seat in his election guide as one of eleven which he classed as bellwether electorates. Roy Morgan Research found the Division of Forde to be the least politically involved electorate in Australia, with only 7% of voters interested in political analysis as a type of media content.

Bert van Manen was defeated by Labor candidate Rowan Holzberger at the 2025 federal election. This was the second federal election contested by Holzberger, the first being in 2022, which he lost by approximately 8,500 votes.

== Members ==
Image	Member	Party	Term	Notes
	David Watson (1945–)	Liberal	1 December 1984 – 11 July 1987	Lost seat. Later elected to the Legislative Assembly of Queensland seat of Moggill in 1989
	Mary Crawford (1947–)	Labor	11 July 1987 – 2 March 1996	Lost seat
	Kay Elson (1947–)	Liberal	2 March 1996 – 17 October 2007	Retired
	Brett Raguse (1960–)	Labor	24 November 2007 – 21 August 2010	Lost seat
	Bert van Manen (1965–)	Liberal (Note: Member of the Liberal National Party of Queensland sitting with the federal parliamentary Liberal Party.)	21 August 2010 – 3 May 2025	Served as Chief Government Whip in the House under Morrison. Served as the Chief Opposition Whip in the House. Lost seat
	Rowan Holzberger (1973–)	Labor	3 May 2025 – present	Incumbent

== Election results ==
2025 Australian federal election: Forde
Party	Candidate	Votes	%	±%
Labor	Rowan Holzberger	36,821	34.24	+6.23
Liberal National	Bert van Manen	33,023	30.71	−6.20
Greens	Kirsty Petersen	12,280	11.42	+1.57
One Nation	Matthew Lambert	11,049	10.28	+2.27
Family First	Corneliu Pop	5,459	5.08	+5.08
Trumpet of Patriots	Jacob Hiscock	5,041	4.69	+4.69
Independent	Chris Greaves	3,186	2.96	−0.18
Citizens	Alf de Hombre	669	0.62	+0.62
Total formal votes		107,528	93.53	+0.31
Informal votes		7,440	6.47	−0.31
Turnout		114,968	85.79	+0.56
Two-party-preferred result
Labor	Rowan Holzberger	55,662	51.77	+6.00
Liberal National	Bert van Manen	51,866	48.23	−6.00
Labor gain from Liberal National		Swing	+6.00	
