= Luke Woolmer =

Australian politician

Member of the Queensland Legislative Assembly for Springwood
- In office 15 July 1995 – 13 June 1998
- Preceded by: Molly Robson
- Succeeded by: Grant Musgrove

Personal details
- Born: Lucas Scott Woolmer; 25 January 1965 (age 61) Geelong, Victoria, Australia
- Party: Liberal Party
- Occupation: Royal Australian Navy, Information Technology

Lucas Scott "Luke" Woolmer (born 25 January 1965) is an Australian politician. He was a Liberal Party member of the Legislative Assembly of Queensland from 1995 to 1998, representing the electorate of Springwood.

== Early career ==
Prior to 1995 Springwood was held by Molly Robson of the Labor Party, who held the seat in the 1992 election with a majority of 10%. Woolmer, who worked in the Information Technology sector prior to running for parliament, entered the election on the tail of the so-called "koala tollway" controversy, in which the Labor government had planned to build a tollway through a koala sanctuary. Woolmer won the election by 18.5%, having received a swing of 19.4% on the back of the preferences from the minor parties.

== Parliament ==
While in parliament Woolmer served as an undersecretary with a focus on IT issues. He helped to establish the government's Ministerial Council for IT & T, and he had hoped to become the state's first IT minister after the 1998 election. This, however, was not to be, as a swing back to Labor saw Woolmer lose his seat to Labor's Grant Musgrove by a narrow margin.

== Later years ==
After his 1998 loss, Woolmer ran unsuccessfully for pre-selection in the Federal seat of McPherson, before returning to work in the IT sector.

Parliament of Queensland
Preceded by Molly Robson	Member for Springwood; 1995–1998	Succeeded by Grant Musgrove
