= Rowan Holzberger =

Australian politician

Rowan Holzberger MP

Member of the Australian Parliament for Forde
- Incumbent
- Assumed office 3 May 2025
- Preceded by: Bert van Manen

Personal details
- Born: 8 January 1973 (age 53) Brisbane, Queensland, Australia
- Party: Labor
- Occupation: Politician, farmer

Rowan Aubrey Victor Holzberger (born 8 January 1973) is an Australian politician, and formerly a farmer and small business owner. He was elected to the Australian House of Representatives at the 2025 federal election for the Division of Forde.

== Early life ==
Holzberger was born on 8 January 1973 in Brisbane, Queensland. He moved to Broken Hill with his family at the age of 11. As a young man, Holzberger attended university in Adelaide, and served as a political staffer for Peter Duncan during the Keating government.

After Labor lost the 1996 federal election, Holzberger returned to Broken Hill where he worked as a fitter and machinist, then a farmer on a sheep and cattle station, and at one point owned a contract mustering business. He eventually moved back to Brisbane and then the Gold Coast where he ran another small business, before settling in Beenleigh, where he has lived with his family since 2006. Holzberger has reputedly known Prime Minister Anthony Albanese since the age of 14.

== Political career ==
Before entering politics, Holzberger worked as an electorate officer for Senator Murray Watt and Queensland state MP Shannon Fentiman.

In the 2015 state election, he ran for the division of Southport, but lost to MP Rob Molhoek. Holzberger subsequently ran for the division of Bonney in the 2017 state election, losing to MP Sam O'Connor. He contested Forde at the 2022 federal election, losing to incumbent MP Bert van Manen by approximately 8,000 votes. In 2025, he contested Forde for a second time, winning 51.8% of the vote after preference distributions and securing a 6% swing to Labor.

Holzberger made his maiden speech to the federal parliament on 24 July 2025.

=== Electoral History ===
Queensland Legislative Assembly
Election year	Electorate	Party	Votes	FP%	+/-	2PP%	+/-	Result
2015	Southport	Labor	10,153	35.09	▲6.66	46.76	▲11.48	Second
2017	Bonney	Labor	9,279	35.70	▲0.70	48.30	▲0.50	Second

Australian House of Representatives
Election year	Electorate	Party	Votes	FP%	+/-	2PP%	+/-	Result
2022	Forde	Labor	26,497	28.01	▼1.50	45.77	▼4.37	Second
2025	Forde	Labor	26,821	34.24	▲6.23	51.77	▲6.00	First

Parliament of Australia
Preceded by Bert van Manen	Member for Forde; 2025–present	Incumbent
