= Molly Robson =

Australian politician

Molly Robson JP

Member of the Queensland Legislative Assembly for Springwood
- In office 2 December 1989 – 15 July 1995
- Preceded by: Huan Fraser
- Succeeded by: Luke Woolmer

Personal details
- Born: 28 March 1942 (age 84) Sydney, New South Wales, Australia
- Party: Labor
- Occupation: Consultant

Molly Jess Robson (born 28 March 1942) is a former Australian politician.

She was born in Sydney and received a Bachelor of Administration, majoring in Industrial Relations. From 1983 to 1990 she was secretary of the Queensland Consumers Association. In 1989 she was elected to the Queensland Legislative Assembly as the Labor member for Springwood. She was appointed Minister for Environment and Heritage in 1992, but in 1995 she lost her seat to Liberal candidate Luke Woolmer .

Parliament of Queensland
Preceded by Huan Fraser	Member for Springwood; 1989–1995	Succeeded by Luke Woolmer
