= David Watson (Queensland politician) =

Australian politician

Leader of the Queensland Liberal Party Elections: 2001
- In office 23 June 1998 – 28 February 2001
- Deputy: Bob Quinn
- Preceded by: Joan Sheldon
- Succeeded by: Bob Quinn

Shadow Minister for Energy
- In office 22 April 2003 – 7 February 2004
- Leader: Lawrence Springborg
- Preceded by: Jeff Seeney
- Succeeded by: Jeff Seeney

Shadow Treasurer of Queensland
- In office 2 July 1998 – 17 February 2001
- Leader: Rob Borbidge
- Preceded by: David Hamill
- Succeeded by: Jeff Seeney

Minister for Public Works and Housing of Queensland
- In office 28 April 1997 – 26 June 1998
- Premier: Rob Borbidge
- Preceded by: Ray Connor
- Succeeded by: Robert Schwarten

Deputy Leader of the Queensland Liberal Party
- In office 13 May 1990 – 24 September 1992
- Leader: Denver Beanland; Joan Sheldon
- Preceded by: Denver Beanland
- Succeeded by: Santo Santoro

Member of the Australian Parliament for Forde
- In office 1 December 1984 – 11 July 1987
- Preceded by: New seat
- Succeeded by: Mary Crawford

Member of the Queensland Legislative Assembly for Moggill
- In office 2 December 1989 – 7 February 2004
- Preceded by: Bill Lickiss
- Succeeded by: Bruce Flegg

Personal details
- Born: David John Hopetoun Watson; 29 January 1945 (age 81) Sydney
- Party: Liberal Party of Australia
- Education: University of Queensland; Ohio State University
- Occupation: Accountant

David John Hopetoun Watson (born 29 January 1945) is an Australian former politician.

== Early life ==
Born in Sydney, Watson was educated at the University of Queensland and Ohio State University before becoming an accountant. He was Professor of Accounting and Dean of Commerce and Economics at the University of Queensland before entering politics.

== Politics ==
In 1984, Watson was elected to the Australian House of Representatives as the Liberal member for Forde. He was defeated in the next federal election in 1987, but in 1989 was elected to the Legislative Assembly of Queensland as the member for Moggill. He was the Queensland Minister for Housing and Public Works 1997–1998 and Leader of the Queensland Liberal Party 1998–2001. As state Liberal leader and Deputy Leader of the Opposition, he led the Liberals into the 2001 state election, which saw Labor reelected in a record landslide. Watson himself was nearly swept up in that year's massive Labor wave, surviving by only 396 votes. He was left as the only non-Labor MLA from Brisbane.

Parliament of Australia
Preceded by New seat	Member for Forde; 1984–1987	Succeeded by Mary Crawford
Parliament of Queensland
Preceded by Bill Lickiss	Member for Moggill; 1989–2004	Succeeded by Bruce Flegg
Political offices
Preceded by Joan Sheldon	Parliamentary Leader of the Liberal Party in Queensland; 1998–2001	Succeeded by Bob Quinn
