= Darren Power =

Australian politician

Mayor of Logan City
- In office 28 March 2020 – 16 March 2024
- Deputy: Natalie Willcocks
- Preceded by: Luke Smith
- Succeeded by: Jon Raven

Logan City Councillor for Division 10
- In office 15 March 1997 – 2 May 2019
- Succeeded by: Miriam Stemp

Personal details
- Born: Darren Ross Power
- Party: Independent (from 2010)
- Other political affiliations: Liberal National (2008–2010); National (1999–2008); Labor
- Spouse: Lynne Power
- Children: 4 (including Lachlan)

Military service
- Allegiance: Australia
- Branch/service: Australian Army Reserve
- Unit: 1st Commando Regiment

Darren Ross Power is an Australian politician who served as the mayor of the City of Logan from 2020 to 2024. Prior to his election as mayor, Power served as Logan City Councillor for Division 10 from 1997 to 2019, and as Advocate for the City of Logan from 2019 to 2020.

== Logan City Council ==
After serving as the Councillor for Division 10 for 22 years, Power and all other councillors for Logan City were terminated by the Queensland Government in May 2019 and a temporary administrator was appointed. The decision followed the Crime and Corruption Commission charging 8 of 12 sitting councillors with official corruption one week earlier. Mr Power and 3 other councillors gave evidence to the Crime and Corruption Commission prior to charges being laid, and were subsequently given official advisory positions by the temporary administrator.

== Electoral history ==
Power was elected mayor of Logan on 28 March 2020, achieving 36.62% of the primary vote and placing first in a field of 8 candidates.

Although elected to the mayoralty as an independent candidate, Power had previously been a member of the Liberal National Party of Queensland, the National Party, and the Australian Labor Party respectively.

While the incumbent councillor for Logan City Council's Division 10, Power stood as the National Party candidate for Springwood in the 2001 Queensland state election, as an independent candidate for the Division of Rankin in the 2004 Australian federal election, and was the endorsed Liberal National candidate for Springwood at the 2009 Queensland state election, however resigned as a candidate to avoid having to resign his seat on council.

In 2010, Power announced his resignation from the Liberal National Party, citing the party's treatment of Beaudesert state MP and former party member Aidan McLindon.

2004 Australian federal election: Rankin
Party	Candidate	Votes	%	±%
Labor	Craig Emerson	34,471	43.92	−1.04
Liberal	Wendy Creighton	28,819	36.72	−4.05
Independent	Darren Power	5,134	6.54	+6.54
Family First	Ross Wilson	4,036	5.14	+5.14
Greens	Julian Hinton	2,422	3.09	+0.34
One Nation	Margaret Hands	1,601	2.04	−4.57
National	Mike Boyd	1,187	1.51	+1.51
Democrats	Catherine Sporle	653	0.83	−3.97
Citizens Electoral Council	Robert Meyers	158	0.20	+0.20
Total formal votes		78,481	92.81	−0.82
Informal votes		6,078	7.19	+0.82
Turnout		84,559	92.89	−1.06
Two-party-preferred result
Labor	Craig Emerson	41,774	53.23	+0.81
Liberal	Wendy Creighton	36,707	46.77	−0.81
Labor hold		Swing	+0.81	

2001 Queensland state election: Springwood
Party	Candidate	Votes	%	±%
Labor	Barbara Stone	11,192	45.6	+7.4
Independent	Hetty Johnston	5,140	20.9	+20.9
National	Darren Power	4,613	18.8	+8.4
Liberal	Bob Ward	3,590	14.6	−9.5
Total formal votes		24,535	97.5	
Informal votes		624	2.5	
Turnout		25,159	92.7	
Two-party-preferred result
Labor	Barbara Stone	12,442	60.4	+10.7
National	Darren Power	8,169	39.6	+39.6
Labor gain from Liberal		Swing	+10.7	

== Personal life ==
He is the father of professional gamer Lachlan Power.
