= Kingston State College =

Secondary school in Queensland, Australia

Kingston College

Location
- Bega Road, Kingston; Logan City, Queensland, 4114; Australia; 27°39′56.3″S 153°06′37.15″E

Information
- Type: state, secondary, co-ed
- Established: 1977
- Principal: Laura Corr-Clements
- Grades: 7–12
- Enrolment: 865 (2025)
- Slogan: Progress with Pride
- Website: kingstonsc.eq.edu.au

Kingston State College is an independent public co-educational secondary school located in the Logan City suburb of Kingston within Queensland, Australia. It is administered by the Queensland Department of Education, with an enrolment of 865 students and a teaching staff of 80, as of 2025. The school serves students from Year 7 to Year 12.

== History ==
The Minister for Education, V. J. Bird (MLA), opened Kingston State High School on 24 January 1977.

In 1986, parents at the school began to notice that many students were arriving undernourished, which hindered their ability to focus on lessons and participate in activities. In response, parents and some teachers established a breakfast club to address this issue. Following its launch, it was noted that "the program would appear to be both worthy and necessary." However, the Queensland Government viewed the initiative differently, considering it an embarrassment for the National Party and highlighting their inadequate response to poverty in the region. In an attempt to discredit the program, the government dispatched a special branch of the police to investigate alleged "subversives" associated with the club. The principal, advised by the teachers' union, agreed only to discuss matters directly related to the breakfast club, refusing to assist in undermining those involved.

On 1 November 1999 it was renamed from Kingston State High School to Kingston College. The name was changed again on 1 January 2016, from Kingston College to the current name of Kingston State College.

In October 2016, the school was sent into a lockdown after a gunman was loose in the area.

== Facilities ==
The campus contains playing fields and courts, and a swimming pool.

== Extra-curriculars ==
The school provides the following extra-curricular activities:

- An Instrumental Music program and school band,
- A Student Athlete Academy,
- Opti-Minds and the Australian Brain Bee Competition.

== See also ==
- Education in Queensland
- List of schools in Greater Brisbane
