= Barbara Stone =

Australian politician

Member for Springwood
- In office 17 February 2001 – 24 March 2012
- Preceded by: Grant Musgrove
- Succeeded by: John Grant

Personal details
- Born: 28 January 1962 (age 64) Brisbane, Queensland, Australia
- Party: Labor
- Occupation: Australia Post, Electorate Officer

Barbara Gwendoline Stone (born 28 January 1962) is an Australian politician. She was a member of the Legislative Assembly of Queensland for Springwood and is a member of the Labor Party.

== Before politics ==
Stone graduated with an Associate Diploma in Business Management and a Bachelor of Business (HRM) at Queensland University of Technology. She then worked at Australia Post for a number of years before becoming an Electorate Officer for Judy Spence, State Member for Mount Gravatt.

== Politics ==
Stone entered Parliament after the 2001 state election, having been selected after the sitting member, Labor's Grant Musgrove, resigned in the wake of an electoral rorting scandal. She subsequently won the 2004, 2006 and 2009 elections, making her the longest-serving Member in the Springwood electorate. She lost the seat at the 2012 state election.

Stone served in a number of positions in the government, including as the Chair of the Law, Justice and Safety Committee. She was also a member of a number of Ministerial Legislative Committees including Police and Corrective Services, Transport and Main Roads, Emergency Services and Sports, and was elected Chair of Caucus for the Labor Party.

Parliament of Queensland
Preceded by Grant Musgrove	Member for Springwood; 2001–2012	Succeeded by John Grant
