= Luke Smith (politician) =

Australian politician

Mayor of Logan City
- In office 13 March 2016 – 2 May 2019
- Deputy: Cherie Dalley
- Preceded by: Pam Parker
- Succeeded by: Darren Power

Logan City Councillor for Division 6
- In office 27 March 2008 – 13 March 2016
- Succeeded by: Stacey McIntosh

Logan City Councillor for Division 5
- In office 16 March 2006 – 27 March 2008
- Succeeded by: Graham Able

Personal details
- Party: Independent
- Other political affiliations: Liberal National Party

Luke Smith is a former Australian politician and convicted criminal, who served as the mayor of the City of Logan, the seventh most populous local government area in Australia. From 2006 until 2016, he was the Divisional Councillor for Logan City Council's Division 6.

Elected as an independent in 2016, Smith ran as the Liberal National Party candidate for the Logan-based federal division of Rankin in 2010.

== Corruption charges ==
On 26 March 2018, Smith was arrested and charged by the Crime and Corruption Commission. The charges include two counts of perjury relating to testimony given to the Commission in 2017, one count of official corruption in his capacity as Mayor of the City of Logan, and one count of failing to properly update his register of interests. The corruption charges related to Smith's relationship with a property developer who, in addition to donating to Smith's election campaign fund, allegedly provided an illegal contribution to progress the development approval of a Springwood hotel.

10 councillors attended a confidential meeting days after Smith's arrest, in which 8 out 10 agreed to formally ask him to stand aside. Acting Deputy Mayor Trevina Schwarz confirmed the "vast majority" of councillors decided to "make a formal request to the Mayor to stand aside for a period of three months pending the proceedings."

On 14 April 2019, Smith and 7 other Logan City councillors were charged with fraud by the Crime and Corruption Commission, which alleged they conspired together to terminate the employment of the council's chief executive officer following reports she was privately assisting a corruption investigation. She was formally terminated by council four months after giving information to the state corruption watchdog about alleged possible misconduct by Smith.

While on bail pending the resolution of corruption charges, on 1 May 2019 Smith was further charged with a number of offences including middle-range drink driving, driving without due care and attention, and breaching his bail conditions after an alleged motor vehicle accident. Police held Smith in custody following the alleged incident.

== Conviction ==
In March 2023, Smith pleaded guilty in the Queensland District Court to receiving a secret commission, failing to update his register of interests, and misconduct relating to public office. His Honour Justice David Kent KC gave Smith an 18-month sentence, wholly suspended, along with 120 hours of community service. Judge Kent described the offending as betraying the public's confidence and a serious breach of responsibilities as a public official. The suspended sentence was due to in part to the impact that the offending purportedly already had on Smith's life and in part due to the guilty plea.
