= Huan Fraser =

Australian politician

Member of the Queensland Legislative Assembly for Springwood
- In office 1 November 1986 – 2 December 1989
- Preceded by: New seat
- Succeeded by: Molly Robson

Personal details
- Born: Huan Donald John Fraser; 16 February 1940 Charleville, Queensland, Australia
- Died: 18 February 2010 (aged 70) Brisbane, Queensland, Australia
- Party: National Party
- Spouse: Wendy Margaret Biddulph (m.1966)
- Occupation: Company director, Grazier, Investment consultant

Huan Donald John Fraser (16 February 1940 – 18 February 2010) was an Australian politician.

A Paroo Shire Councillor and former Deputy Mayor of Logan City, Fraser was elected to the Legislative Assembly of Queensland in 1986 as the National Party's member for Springwood, although he was motivated more by local concerns than by Premier Joh Bjelke-Petersen's leadership. When Russell Cooper became Premier of Queensland in September 1989 he appointed Fraser Minister for Industry, Small Business and Technology, but at the election later that year the government was defeated and Fraser lost his seat.

Parliament of Queensland
New seat	Member for Springwood; 1986–1989	Succeeded by Molly Robson
