= Electoral district of Springwood =

State electoral district of Queensland, Australia

Springwood Queensland—Legislative Assembly
- Electoral map of Springwood 2017
- State: Queensland
- Dates current: 1986–present
- MP: Mick de Brenni
- Party: Labor
- Namesake: Springwood
- Electors: 35,376 (2020)
- Area: 99 km^{2} (38.2 sq mi)
- Demographic: Outer-metropolitan
- Coordinates: 27°39′S 153°10′E
Electorates around Springwood:
Mansfield	Mansfield	Capalaba
Waterford	Springwood	Redlands
Waterford	Macalister	Redlands

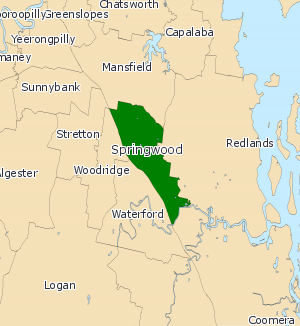
2008 electoral map of Springwood

Springwood is an electoral district of the Legislative Assembly in the Australian state of Queensland.

The district is based in several suburbs of Logan City. It is named after the suburb of Springwood and also includes the suburbs of Daisy Hill, Loganholme, Rochedale South and Shailer Park. The electorate was first contested in 1986.

== History and political profile ==
The inaugural member for Springwood was Huan Fraser, who represented the National Party. Labor's Molly Robson defeated Fraser in the 1989 state election. She held the seat in the 1992 election, but lost it to the Liberal's Luke Woolmer in 1995 on the back of the Koala tollway controversy, in which the sitting Labor government had announced plans to build a tollway through a koala sanctuary. Woolmer won the seat with a 19.4% swing, but narrowly lost it to Labor in 1998. Labor continued to hold the seat in the 2001, 2004, 2006 and 2010 elections. In 2012, John Grant, a Logan City Councillor, won the seat for the Liberal National Party with a 19.47% swing.

== Members for Springwood ==
Member	Party	Term
Huan Fraser	National	1986–1989
Molly Robson	Labor	1989–1995
Luke Woolmer	Liberal	1995–1998
Grant Musgrove	Labor	1998–2000
Grant Musgrove	Independent	2000–2001
Barbara Stone	Labor	2001–2012
John Grant	Liberal National	2012–2015
Mick de Brenni	Labor	2015–present

== Election results ==
2024 Queensland state election: Springwood
Party	Candidate	Votes	%	±%
Labor	Mick de Brenni	13,184	41.19	−7.61
Liberal National	Susanna Damianopoulos	12,348	38.58	+4.08
Greens	Benjamin Harry	2,701	8.44	+0.94
One Nation	Glen Cookson	2,201	6.88	+1.48
Family First	Gabrielle Davis	1,114	3.48	+3.48
Independent	Karley Saidy-Hennessey	458	1.43	+1.43
Total formal votes		32,006	96.30	
Informal votes		1,230	3.70	
Turnout		33,236	90.33	
Two-party-preferred result
Labor	Mick de Brenni	16,677	52.11	−6.19
Liberal National	Susanna Damianopoulos	15,329	47.89	+6.19
Labor hold		Swing	-6.19	
