= Cleveland–Redland Bay Road =

Road route in Queensland, Australia

Cleveland–Redland Bay Road Queensland

General information
- Type: Road
- Length: 15.2 km (9.4 mi)
- Route number(s): (Cleveland – Redland Bay)

Major junctions
- North end: Capalaba–Cleveland Road (Shore Street West), Cleveland
- Redland Bay Road (Boundary Road); Colburn Avenue
- South end: Beenleigh–Redland Bay Road (Serpentine Creek Road), Redland Bay

Location(s)
- Major suburbs: Thornlands, Victoria Point

Cleveland–Redland Bay Road is a continuous 15.2 kilometres (9.4 mi) road route in the Redland local government area of Queensland, Australia. The route is designated as part of State Route 47. It is a state-controlled district road (number 109) rated as a local road of regional significance (LRRS).

== Route description ==
Cleveland–Redland Bay Road commences at an intersection with Capalaba–Cleveland Road (Shore Street West) in Cleveland as State Route 47. It runs south as Waterloo Street, crossing two roundabouts before turning east on Russell Street. It then turns south on Bloomfield Street. As it crosses South Street and enters Thornlands the name changes to Cleveland–Redland Bay Road.

Continuing through Thornlands it turns south-east and passes the exit to Redland Bay Road (Boundary Road) as it approaches the southern boundary (Eprapah Creek). Soon after entering Victoria Point it passes the exit to Colburn Avenue. From there the road continues south and south-east into Redland Bay, where it again turns south before turning south-east to its end at an intersection with Beenleigh-Redland Bay Road (Serpentine Creek Road).

Land use along the road is mainly residential, with a small area of rural on the western side in Redland Bay.

== Road condition ==
The road is fully sealed, with several short sections of four-lane dual carriageway. A project to upgrade sections of the road, at a cost of $110 million, was in construction in late 2021.

== History ==
Cleveland was surveyed in 1840, and was recommended for development as a port in 1841. In 1847 a navigation beacon was installed and a new town was planned. In 1850 Cleveland was proclaimed a township, but in 1852 it lost any chance of becoming a major port, although the navigation beacon was replaced by a lighthouse in 1864. The town became the commercial centre for the surrounding area, with timber cutting and farming being the main industries.

Thornlands was originally part of Cleveland. It was made available for settlement by small farmers from 1858.

The Redland Bay region was settled from the 1860s, first by timber cutters and then by farmers. Cotton was the first crop, but was unsuccessful and soon replaced by sugar cane. The first roads from north to south were made by timber cutters to enable transport of their product to market.

== Intersecting state-controlled roads ==
This road intersects with the following state-controlled roads:

- Capalaba–Cleveland Road
- Redland Bay Road
- Colburn Avenue

=== Capalaba–Cleveland Road ===
Capalaba–Cleveland Road
- Location: Cleveland Sub-Arterial Road (Old Cleveland Road), Capalaba to Cleveland–Redland Bay Road (Waterloo Street), Cleveland
- Length: 7.5 km (4.7 mi)
- Route number: 22

Capalaba–Cleveland Road is a state-controlled regional road (number 112), part of which is rated as a local road of regional significance (LRRS). It is signed as State Route 22. It runs from Cleveland Sub-Arterial Road (Old Cleveland Road) in Capalaba to Cleveland–Redland Bay Road (Waterloo Street) in Cleveland, a distance of 7.5 kilometres (4.7 mi). It starts in Capalaba as part of Old Cleveland Road, then becomes Finucane Road to Cleveland, where it changes to Shore Street West. It intersects with Birkdale Road (Moreton Bay Road / Old Cleveland Road East) in Capalaba.

=== Redland Bay Road ===
Redland Bay Road
- Location: Redland Sub-Arterial Road (Mount Cotton Road), Burbank to Cleveland–Redland Bay Road, Thornlands
- Length: 11.9 km (7.4 mi)
- Route number: 21

Redland Bay Road is a state-controlled district road (number 110) rated as a local road of regional significance (LRRS). It is signed as State Route 21. It runs from Redland Sub-Arterial Road (Mount Cotton Road) in Burbank (where it crosses Tingalpa Creek) to Cleveland–Redland Bay Road in Thornlands, a distance of 11.9 kilometres (7.4 mi). It starts as part of Mount Cotton Road, then becomes Duncan Road, and finally Boundary Road. It intersects with Capalaba–Victoria Point Road (also known as Redland Bay Road – see note below) in Capalaba.

NOTE: The road shown as Redland Bay Road on Google maps is officially Capalaba–Victoria Point Road.

=== Colburn Avenue ===
Colburn Avenue
- Location: Cleveland–Redland Bay Road, Victoria Point to Thompson Street, Victoria Point
- Length: 2.7 km (1.7 mi)
- Route number: 21

Colburn Avenue is a state-controlled district road (number 1082) rated as a local road of regional significance (LRRS). It is signed as State Route 21. It runs from Cleveland–Redland Bay Road in Victoria Point to Thompson Street in Victoria Point, a distance of 2.7 kilometres (1.7 mi). It has no major intersections.

== Associated state-controlled roads ==
The following state-controlled roads are associated with the intersecting roads described above:

- Intersecting with Capalaba–Cleveland Road:
  - Birkdale Road
- Intersecting with Birkdale Road:
  - Brisbane–Redland Road
- Intersecting with Brisbane–Redland Road and Birkdale Road:
  - Capalaba–Victoria Point Road

=== Birkdale Road ===
Birkdale Road
- Location: Capalaba–Victoria Point Road, Capalaba to Main Road, Wellington Point
- Length: 6.8 km (4.2 mi)
- Route number: 54

Birkdale Road is a state-controlled road (number 1122), part regional and part district, with part rated as a local road of regional significance (LRRS). It is signed as State Route 54 for most of its length. It runs from Capalaba–Victoria Point Road (Redland Bay Road) in Capalaba to Main Road in Wellington Point, a distance of 6.8 kilometres (4.2 mi). It is known as Moreton Bay Road (part of SR22), Old Cleveland Road East (part of SR54), and Birkdale Road (part of SR54 and part of SR43). This road intersects with Brisbane–Redland Road (Moreton Bay Road) in Capalaba.

=== Brisbane–Redland Road ===
Brisbane–Redland Road
- Location: Cleveland Sub-Arterial Road (Old Cleveland Road), Capalaba to Birkdale Road (Moreton Bay Road), Capalaba
- Length: 3.6 km (2.2 mi)
- Route number: 22

Brisbane–Redland Road is a state-controlled regional road (number 905). It is signed as State Route 22. It runs from Cleveland Sub-Arterial Road (Old Cleveland Road) in Capalaba to Birkdale Road (Moreton Bay Road) in Capalaba, a distance of 3.6 kilometres (2.2 mi). It is known as Moreton Bay Road, and serves as a bypass of the Capalaba CBD. It intersects with Capalaba–Victoria Point Road (Redland Bay Road) in Capalaba.

=== Capalaba–Victoria Point Road ===
Capalaba–Victoria Point Road
- Location: Brisbane–Redland Road (Moreton Bay Road), Capalaba to Redland Bay Road (Boundary Road), Alexandra Hills
- Length: 6.4 km (4.0 mi)
- Route number: 44

Capalaba–Victoria Point Road is a state-controlled district road (number 1102) rated as a local road of regional significance (LRRS). It is signed as State Route 44. It runs from the intersection of Brisbane–Redland Road (Moreton Bay Road) and Birkdale Road in Capalaba to Redland Bay Road (Boundary Road) in Alexandra Hills, a distance of 6.4 kilometres (4.0 mi). It is known as Redland Bay Road. It has no intersections with other state-controlled roads.

NOTE: The road shown as Redland Bay Road on Google Maps is officially Capalaba–Victoria Point Road.

== Major intersections ==
All distances are from Google Maps. The entire road is within the Redland local government area.

Location	km	mi	Destinations	Notes
Cleveland	0	0.0	Capalaba–Cleveland Road (Shore Street West) – west – Capalaba; Shore Street West – east – Cleveland Point Light	Northern end of Cleveland–Redland Bay Road (State Route 47); Road continues south as Waterloo Street.
Cleveland	0.6	0.37	Russell Street	Four-way roundabout. Road turns east as Russell Street.
Cleveland	0.8	0.50	Bloomfield Street	Four-way roundabout. Road turns south as Bloomfield Street.
Cleveland / Thornlands midpoint	2.9	1.8	South Street	Name changes to Cleveland–Redland Bay Road. Road continues south.
Thornlands	6.8	4.2	Redland Bay Road (Boundary Road) – west, then northwest – Capalaba	Northern concurrency terminus with State Route 21. Road continues south-east.
Victoria Point	7.4	4.6	Colburn Avenue – east – Victoria Point Reserve	Southern concurrency terminus with State Route 21. Road continues south.
Redland Bay	15.2	9.4	Beenleigh–Redland Bay Road (Serpentine Creek Road) – south – Carbrook, Cornubia, Loganholme; Serpentine Creek Road – northeast – Redland Bay	Southern end of Cleveland–Redland Bay Road. State Route 47 continues south as Beenleigh–Redland Bay Road (Serpentine Creek Road).
1.000 mi = 1.609 km; 1.000 km = 0.621 mi: Concurrency terminus; Route transition

== See also ==
- List of road routes in Queensland
- List of numbered roads in Queensland
