= Tanah Merah, Queensland =

Tanah Merah
- Suburb
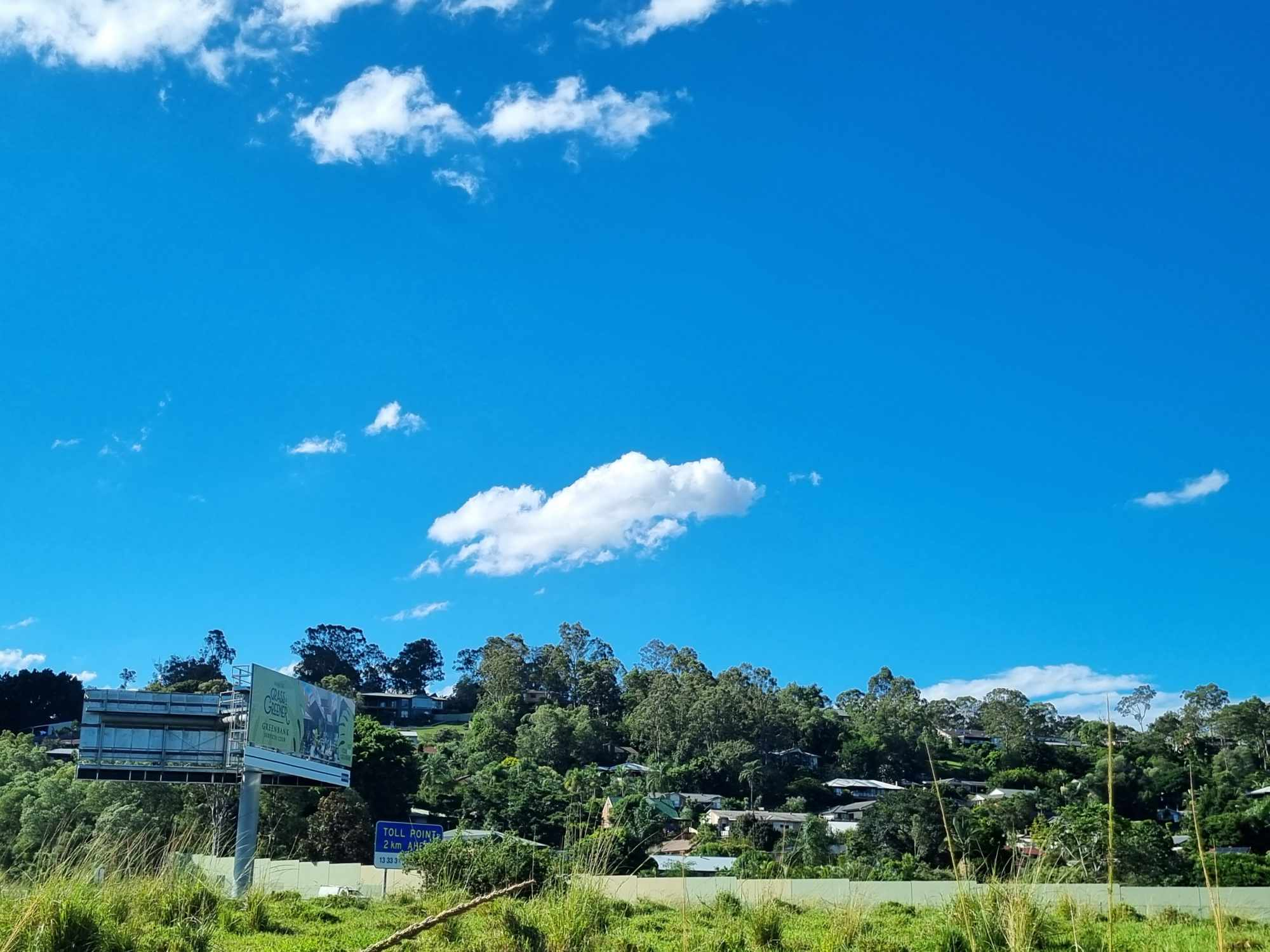
- View of the northern spur of Tanah Merah hill, 2025

- Interactive map of Tanah Merah
- Coordinates: 27.6705°S 153.1694°E
- Country: Australia
- State: Queensland
- City: Logan City
- LGA: Logan City
- Location: 11.9 km (7.4 mi) SE of Logan Central; 31.3 km (19.4 mi) SE of Brisbane CBD; 48.4 km (30.1 mi) NNW of Surfers Paradise
- Established: 1971

Government
  - State electorate: Waterford
  - Federal division: Forde

Area
  - Total: 4.0 km^{2} (1.5 sq mi)

Population
  - Total: 4,754 (2021 census)
  - Density: 1,189/km^{2} (3,080/sq mi)
- Time zone: UTC+10:00 (AEST)
- Postcode: 4128
Suburbs around Tanah Merah
Slacks Creek	Shailer Park	Loganholme
Meadowbrook	Tanah Merah	Loganholme
Bethania	Bethania	Loganholme

Tanah Merah is a residential suburb in the City of Logan, Queensland, Australia. It was officially named by the Queensland Place Names Board in 1971. In the 2021 census, Tanah Merah had a population of 4,754 people.

== Geography ==
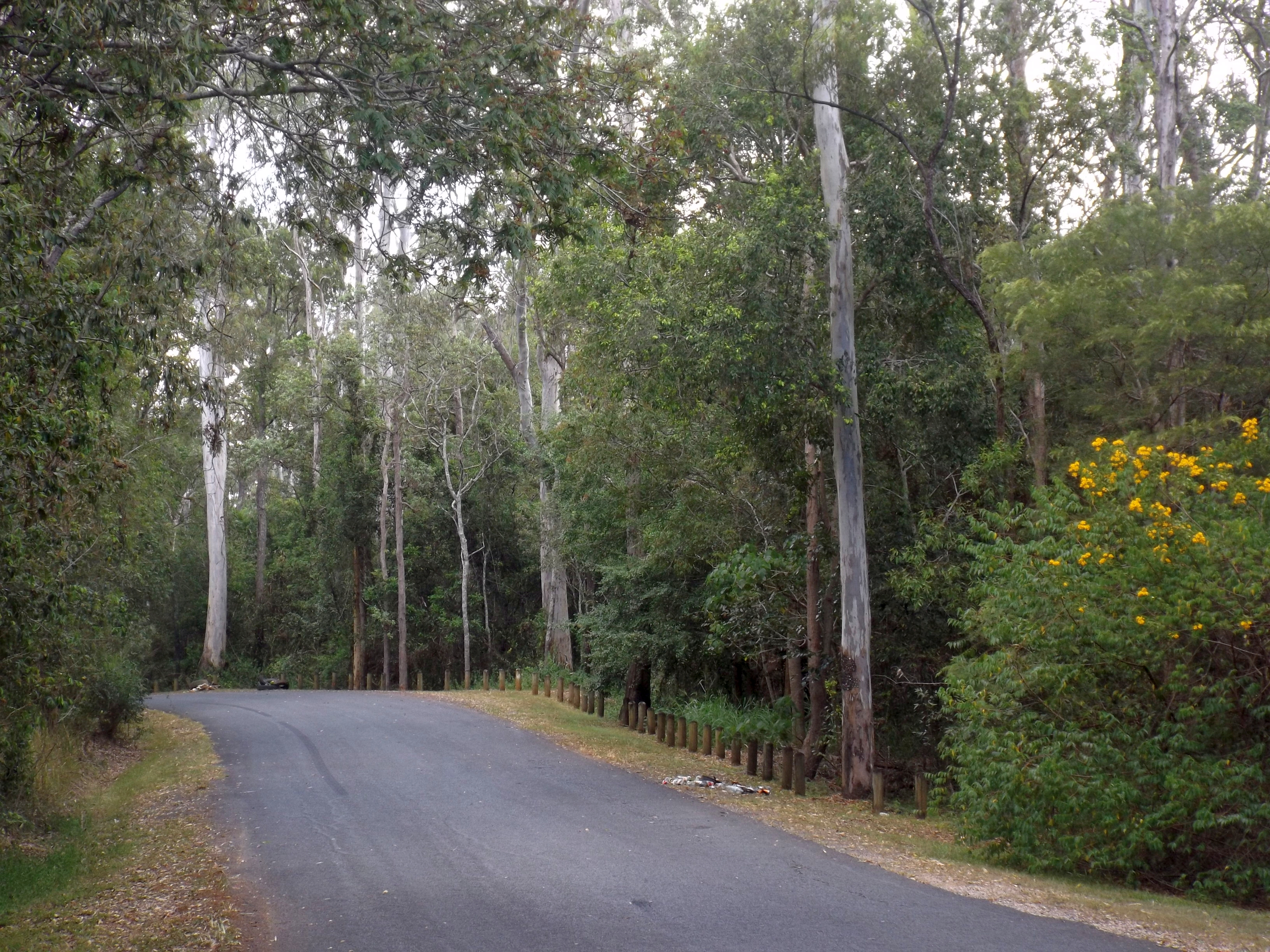
Murray's Road, 2016

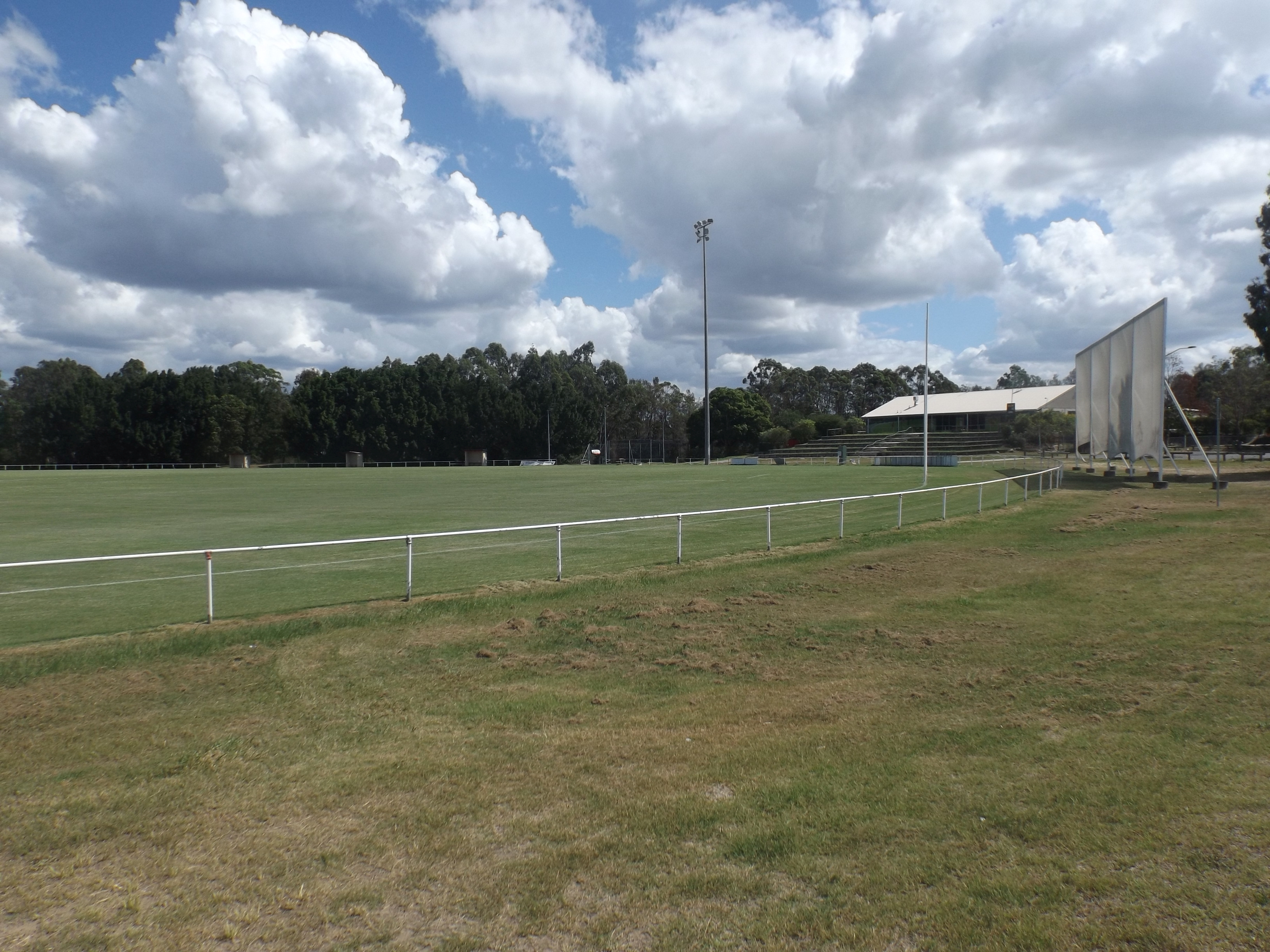
Tansey Park, 2016

Murray's Road also holds the largest single population of Austromyrtus gonoclada trees. Less than 300 specimens are known to exist and many are located along the road itself as well on adjoining property (27.6614°S 153.1623°E).

== History ==
The suburb was first known as part of Slacks Creek. Originally this land was bought and named by the McBride's, an English family who moved to Brisbane from Penang, Malaysia.

The population of Tanah Merah expanded significantly between 2001 and 2006 after land to the west of Drews Road was developed into a housing estate.

== Demographics ==
In the 2011 census, Tanah Merah had a population of 4,608 people, 50.7% female and 49.3% male. The median age of the Tanah Merah population was 33 years, 4 years below the national median of 37. 69.1% of people living in Tanah Merah were born in Australia. The other top responses for country of birth were New Zealand 8.2%, England 4.7%, South Africa 1.2%, Scotland 0.7%, Germany 0.5%. 87.2% of people spoke only English at home; the next most common languages were 1.2% Arabic, 0.7% Mandarin, 0.7% Spanish, 0.5% Hungarian, 0.4% German.

In the 2016 census, Tanah Merah had a population of 4,752 people, 50.8% female and 49.2% male. The median age of the Tanah Merah population was 35 years, 3 years below the national median of 38. 66.3% of people living in Tanah Merah were born in Australia. The other top responses for country of birth were New Zealand 8.3%, England 4.2%, South Africa 1.4%, Philippines 0.8% and Scotland 0.7%. 81.3% of people only spoke English at home; the next most common languages were 1.1% Mandarin, 0.8% Arabic, 0.7% Samoan, 0.6% Spanish and 0.5% Romanian.

In the 2021 census, Tanah Merah had a population of 4,754 people, 50.1% female and 49.9% male. The median age of the Tanah Merah population was 37 years, 1 year below the national median of 38. 69.8% of people living in Tanah Merah were born in Australia. The other top responses for country of birth were New Zealand 8.0%, England 3.6%, Philippines 1.0%, South Africa 0.9% and India 0.7%. 83.8% of people only spoke English at home; the next most common languages were 1.3% Mandarin, 0.7% Hindi, 0.6% Arabic, 0.6% Hungarian and 0.5% Samoan.

== Education ==
There are no schools in Tanah Merah. The nearest government primary schools are Loganholme State School in neighbouring Loganholme to the south and Shailer Park State School and Kimberley Park State School, both in neighbouring Shailer Park to the north. The nearest government secondary school is Shailer Park State High School in Shailer Park.

== Amenities ==
Tanah Merah Shopping Plaza is on the north-east corner of Sambit Street and Tansey Drive (27.6774°S 153.1751°E).

There are a number of parks in the area:

- Hanlon Street Park (27.6815°S 153.1748°E)
- Tahan Crescent Park (27.6760°S 153.1728°E)
- Tansey Park (27.6799°S 153.1681°E)

There is a boat ramp at Tansey Park at Tansey Drive on the north bank of Logan River (27.6775°S 153.1660°E). It is managed by the Logan City Council.
