= Loganholme, Queensland =

Loganholme
- Suburb
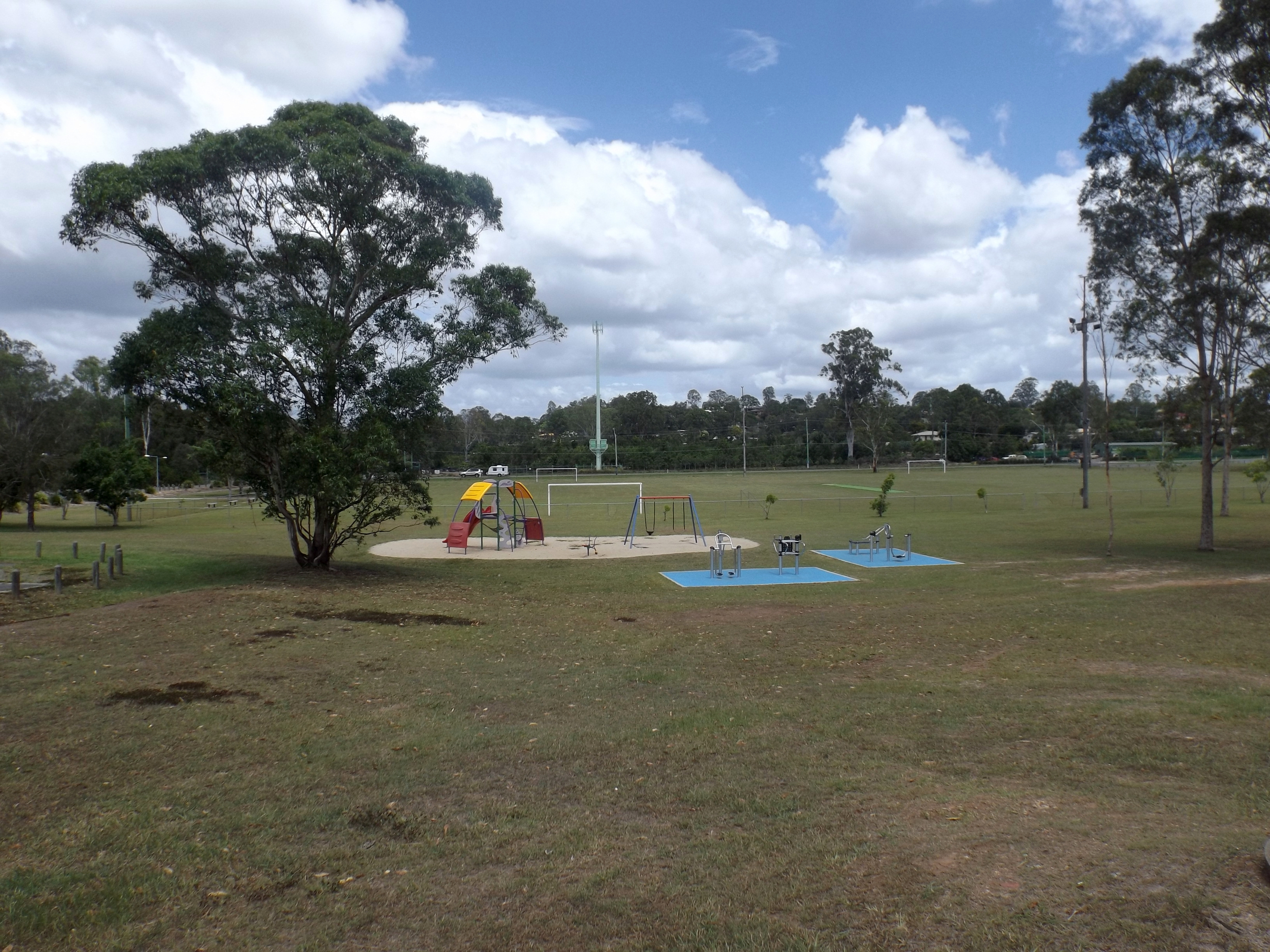
- Tudor Park, 2016

- Interactive map of Loganholme
- Coordinates: 27.6830°S 153.1894°E
- Country: Australia
- State: Queensland
- City: Logan City
- LGA: Logan City
- Location: 12.8 km (8.0 mi) SE of Logan Central; 30.6 km (19.0 mi) SSE of Brisbane CBD; 49 km (30 mi) NNW of Surfers Paradise

Government
  - State electorates: Waterford; Macalister
  - Federal division: Forde

Area
  - Total: 9.1 km^{2} (3.5 sq mi)
- Elevation: 14 m (46 ft)

Population
  - Total: 6,764 (2021 census)
  - Density: 743/km^{2} (1,925/sq mi)
- Time zone: UTC+10:00 (AEST)
- Postcode: 4129
Suburbs around Loganholme
Tanah Merah	Shailer Park	Cornubia
Bethania	Loganholme	Eagleby
Edens Landing	Holmview	Beenleigh

Loganholme (/ˈloʊɡənhoʊm/ LOH-gən-hohm) is a suburb in the City of Logan, within southern Greater Brisbane, Australia. In the 2021 census, Loganholme had a population of 6,764.

== Geography ==
The suburb is bisected by the Pacific Motorway and the Logan Motorway which aligns with a small section of the northern boundary. The southern and western boundaries of the suburb follow the Logan River. Tudor Park on Clarks Road features sports facilities. The Beenleigh–Redland Bay Road exits to the north-east.

A small pocket of land by the Logan River is known as Alexander Clark Park. The park is well-facilitated and available for large groups and events such as weddings.

East of the motorway is a large commercial and industrial area, adjacent to vacant flood plains. Here the largest wastewater treatment plant in the City of Logan began an upgrade process in 2014. The upgrade was needed to meet population growth in the area.

In the northern tip of Loganholme, adjacent to the Logan Hyperdome is a retail district with a public hotel. Nearby, along Bryants Road is the Loganholme police station.

=== Climate ===
Climate data for Logan City (1991–2020 normals, extremes 1992–present)
Month	Jan	Feb	Mar	Apr	May	Jun	Jul	Aug	Sep	Oct	Nov	Dec	Year
Record high °C (°F)	41.9 (107.4)	41.0 (105.8)	38.9 (102.0)	33.8 (92.8)	31.1 (88.0)	29.3 (84.7)	29.3 (84.7)	34.3 (93.7)	38.4 (101.1)	37.7 (99.9)	40.7 (105.3)	40.3 (104.5)	41.9 (107.4)
Mean daily maximum °C (°F)	29.9 (85.8)	29.5 (85.1)	28.5 (83.3)	26.5 (79.7)	24.0 (75.2)	21.7 (71.1)	21.6 (70.9)	22.8 (73.0)	25.2 (77.4)	26.5 (79.7)	28.0 (82.4)	29.2 (84.6)	26.1 (79.0)
Daily mean °C (°F)	25.3 (77.5)	25.0 (77.0)	23.9 (75.0)	21.3 (70.3)	18.4 (65.1)	15.9 (60.6)	15.3 (59.5)	16.2 (61.2)	18.9 (66.0)	20.8 (69.4)	22.8 (73.0)	24.3 (75.7)	20.7 (69.3)
Mean daily minimum °C (°F)	20.7 (69.3)	20.6 (69.1)	19.2 (66.6)	16.1 (61.0)	12.7 (54.9)	10.2 (50.4)	8.9 (48.0)	9.5 (49.1)	12.6 (54.7)	15.1 (59.2)	17.5 (63.5)	19.3 (66.7)	15.2 (59.4)
Record low °C (°F)	13.4 (56.1)	15.0 (59.0)	12.4 (54.3)	7.4 (45.3)	2.5 (36.5)	2.0 (35.6)	−0.5 (31.1)	0.8 (33.4)	4.4 (39.9)	7.8 (46.0)	8.5 (47.3)	11.8 (53.2)	−0.5 (31.1)
Average precipitation mm (inches)	128.1 (5.04)	158.9 (6.26)	134.3 (5.29)	77.8 (3.06)	96.2 (3.79)	73.8 (2.91)	34.3 (1.35)	42.4 (1.67)	39.0 (1.54)	74.3 (2.93)	97.2 (3.83)	139.3 (5.48)	1,095.6 (43.13)
Average precipitation days (≥ 1 mm)	9.3	10.9	10.6	7.8	7.0	6.4	5.1	4.0	4.9	6.6	8.6	9.6	90.9
Average dew point °C (°F)	20.2 (68.4)	20.3 (68.5)	19.2 (66.6)	16.5 (61.7)	13.2 (55.8)	11.0 (51.8)	9.6 (49.3)	9.9 (49.8)	12.5 (54.5)	14.9 (58.8)	17.0 (62.6)	18.7 (65.7)	15.3 (59.5)
Source 1: National Oceanic and Atmospheric Administration
Source 2: Bureau of Meteorology

== History ==
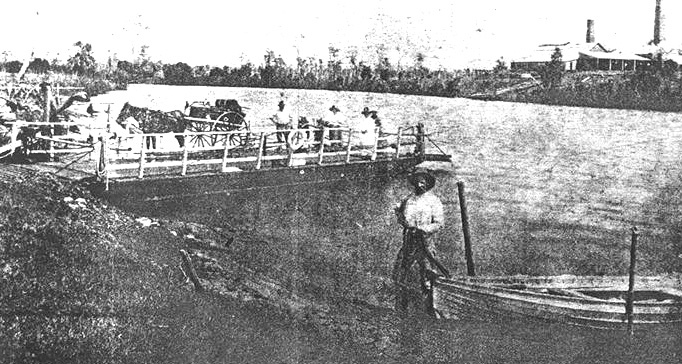
Logan River crossing, ~1890

A cotton gin, which was converted to a sugar mill, was built at Loganholme in 1867.

Loganholme State School opened on 24 May 1873. It closed on 28 Feb 1890, reopening as Loganholme Provisional School in April 1890. On 23 January 1893 it became Loganholme State School once again.

The existing ferry crossing at Loganhholme, known as the Beenleigh Ferry, established in the 1870s, was facing increased delays by the 1920s as vehicle traffic passing through the area increased dramatically. A road crossing from Loganholme to Beenleigh was opened in July 1931. The bridge here was duplicated in May 1968 and rebuilt in 1999 when the Pacific Motorway was widened.

Until 1949, Loganholme was within Shire of Tingalpa.

St Matthew's Catholic Primary School opened on 23 January 1984 in the tradition of Mary MacKillop. It is now within the boundaries of the neighbouring suburb of Cornubia.

== Demographics ==
In the 2021 census, Loganholme had a population of 6,764, 50.3% female and 49.7% male. The median age was 34 years, 4 years below the national median of 38. 73.0% of people were born in Australia. The other top responses for country of birth were New Zealand 8.1%, England 3.5%, South Africa 1.0%, Philippines 1.0% and Vietnam 0.8%. 85.9% of people only spoke English at home; the next most common languages were 1.0% Vietnamese, 0.7% Mandarin, 0.5% Hindi, 0.5% Spanish and 0.4% Maori (New Zealand).

In the 2016 census, Loganholme had a population of 6,303, 50.2% female and 49.8% male. The median age was 33 years, 5 years below the national median of 38. 72.1% of people were born in Australia. The other top responses for country of birth were New Zealand 9.1%, England 4.4%, South Africa 0.9%, Philippines 0.7% and Vietnam 0.6%. 88.0% of people only spoke English at home; the next most common languages were 0.8% Vietnamese, 0.6% Mandarin, 0.5% Hindi, 0.5% Maori (New Zealand) and 0.4% Korean.

In the 2011 census, Loganholme had a population of 6,124, 50.2% female and 49.8% male. The median age of the Loganholme population was 31 years, 6 years below the national median of 37. 73.2% of people were born in Australia. The other top responses for country of birth were New Zealand 8%, England 4.8%, South Africa 1%, Philippines 0.8%, Scotland 0.7%. 90.1% of people spoke only English at home; the next most common languages were 0.5% Vietnamese, 0.5% Mandarin, 0.4% Hindi, 0.4% Samoan, 0.3% German.

== Education ==
Loganholme State School is a government primary (Prep–6) school for boys and girls at Wandilla Crescent (27.6863°S 153.1806°E). In 2017, the school had an enrolment of 541 students with 37 teachers (33 full-time equivalent) and 22 non-teaching staff (14 full-time equivalent). It includes a special education program.

There are no secondary schools in Loganholme. The nearest government secondary schools are Shailer Park State High School in neighbouring Shailer Park to the north and Beenleigh State High School in neighbouring Beenleigh to the south-east.

== Transport ==
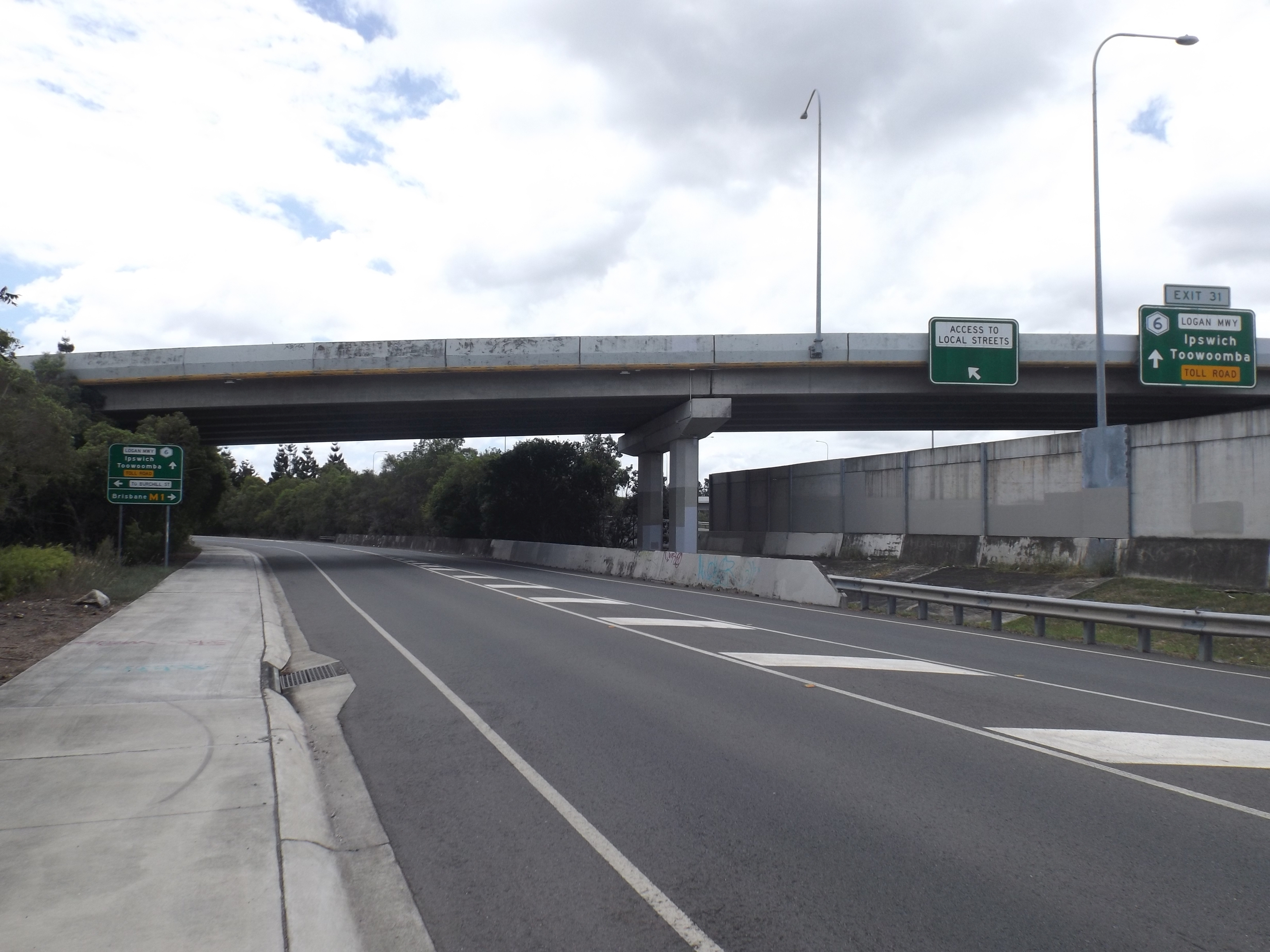
Logan Motorway overpass, 2016

A bus interchange is located adjacent to the Logan Hyperdome. A regular bus links to both Beenleigh and Logan Central. The grade separated intersection of the two motorways was originally built in 1988.

== Notable people ==
- Kristy Wallace (b. 1996), WNBA player for the Toronto Tempo
