= Sef Fa'agase =

Samoan/Australian rugby union player

- Born: Sef Fa'agase; 5 March 1991 (age 35) Auckland, New Zealand
- Height: 1.85 m (6 ft 1 in)
- Weight: 112 kg (17 st 9 lb; 247 lb)
- School: Shailer Park State High School

Rugby union career
- Position: Prop
- Current team: Reds / Otago
Senior career
Years	Team	Apps	(Points)
2010–13	Wests Bulldogs		
2014–2022	Queensland University		
2014	Brisbane City	8	(0)
2015–2017	Queensland Country	22	(15)
2020	Yokohama Canon Eagles	6	(0)
2021	New England Free Jacks	11	(0)
- Correct as of 16 February 2022
Provincial / State sides
Years	Team	Apps	(Points)
2018	Canterbury	11	(5)
2019	Wellington	7	(0)
2020	Otago	2	(0)
Super Rugby
Years	Team	Apps	(Points)
2015–2018	Queensland Reds	46	(5)
2019	Highlanders	3	(0)
2022	Rebels	2	(0)
2022–2025	Reds	39	(0)
- Correct as of 6 June 2025

Sef Fa'agase (born 5 March 1991), is an Australian rugby union player of Samoan descent. His usual position is prop. He plays for the New England Free Jacks of Major League Rugby (MLR).

Fa'agase previously played for Brisbane City in the National Rugby Championship and for Queensland Reds in Super Rugby.

== Early life ==
Fa'agase was born in Auckland, New Zealand but moved to Australia as a young boy with his family. He played junior rugby union for the Beaudesert Warriors from the age of 12 to 15, Berrinba East State School where he spent a brief period playing rugby league and attended Shailer Park State High School.

== Rugby career ==
Fa'agase played for Wests Bulldogs in the Queensland Premier Rugby competition before being selected for the ARU's National Academy in 2012. He played for Reds A in the Pacific Rugby Cup in 2013 and 2014, and joined the University of Queensland Rugby Club which won the premiership in 2014.

The Brisbane City coach Nick Stiles recruited Fa'agase to play in the 2014 National Rugby Championship. He became a regular starter for the team during the season and was the starting tighthead prop in Brisbane's grand final win against Perth Spirit.

Fa'agase made his Super Rugby debut against the Brumbies on 12 February as the Reds' replacement tighthead prop.

In 2020, Fa'agase was signed to a two-year deal by the New England Free Jacks in the Major League Rugby competition. While in the United States Fa'agase played for the Division 1 Mystic River Rugby Club.

== Super Rugby statistics ==
As of 30 May 2022

Season	Team	Games	Starts	Sub	Mins	Tries	Cons	Pens	Drops	Points	Yel	Red
2015	Reds	8	0	8	190	0	0	0	0	0	0	0
2016	Reds	15	4	11	437	0	0	0	0	0	0	0
2017	Reds	11	9	2	610	0	0	0	0	0	1	0
2018	Reds	9	0	9	133	1	0	0	0	5	0	0
2019	Highlanders	3	0	3	70	0	0	0	0	0	0	0
2022	Rebels	2	0	2	50	0	0	0	0	0	0	0
2022	Reds	4	0	4	96	0	0	0	0	0	0	0
Total		52	13	39	1,586	1	0	0	0	5	1	0
