= Parer =

Parer or parer may refer to:

== Items used for paring ==
- Pencil sharpener, called a 'parer' in some countries
- Peeler, a specialized kitchen tool used to remove the outer layer (pare) of some vegetables and fruits
- Paring knife, a small all-purpose kitchen knife with a plain edge

== People ==
- Damien Parer, an Australian war photographer
- David Parer, an Australian natural history film maker
- Ray Parer, an Australian aviator
- Warwick Parer, an Australian politician

== Other ==
- Parer, one of six house names in Chisholm Catholic College
