= Beenleigh–Redland Bay Road =

Road in Queensland, Australia

Beenleigh–Redland Bay Road Queensland

General information
- Type: Road
- Length: 16.5 km (10 mi)
- Route number(s): (Loganholme – Redland Bay)

Major junctions
- West end: Pacific Motorway, Loganholme
- Bryants Road; Mount Cotton Road
- East end: Cleveland–Redland Bay Road, Redland Bay

Location(s)
- Major suburbs: Cornubia, Carbrook

Beenleigh–Redland Bay Road is a continuous 16.5 kilometres (10.3 mi) road route in the Logan and Redland local government areas of Queensland, Australia. The route is designated as part of State Route 47. It is a state-controlled district road (number 108) rated as a local road of regional significance (LRRS).

== Route description ==
Beenleigh–Redland Bay Road commences at an intersection with the Pacific Motorway in Loganholme, just north of Beenleigh, as State Route 47. Starting at the western service road to the Pacific Motorway, it runs north-east under the motorway before turning east. It passes the exit to Bryants Road as it enters Cornubia. It then turns south-east, following the north side of the Logan River through Carbrook.

On entering Redland Bay the road turns north-east and its name changes to Longland Road. It then turns north as Serpentine Creek Road. Continuing north it reaches an intersection where Serpentine Creek Road exits to the north-east and State Route 47 turns north-west as Cleveland–Redland Bay Road. This is the eastern end of Beenleigh–Redland Bay Road.

Land use along the road is mainly rural, with the exception of the short residential section through the southern tip of Cornubia.

== Road condition ==
The road is fully sealed, with a short section of four-lane dual carriageway. A project to signalise the intersection with Kruger Road and to improve associated roadworks, at a cost of $23.85 million, was completed in November 2021. Kruger Road provides access to several schools in Carbrook.

A project to plan for a future upgrade of a 1.7 kilometres (1.1 mi) section at Cornubia will be undertaken in the 2022-23 and 2023-24 financial years.

== History ==
Farming had begun along the north bank of the Logan River by the 1860s, with a cotton gin, later converted to a sugar mill, built in Loganholme in 1867. Carbrook was settled by German immigrants in 1868. This may have resulted in many small farms along the river and the development of a road to enable access by wheeled vehicles.

The Redland Bay region was settled from the 1860s, first by timber cutters and then by farmers. Cotton was the first crop, but was unsuccessful and soon replaced by sugar cane. The first roads from north to south may have been made by timber cutters to enable transport of their product to market. In time the north-south road would have been linked to the west-east road from Loganholme, resulting in the forerunner of the Beenleigh-Redland Bay Road that exists today.

== Coomera Connector ==
It is planned that a local road from the Coomera Connector will cross the Logan River from Eagleby to Carbrook, ending at the intersection of Beenleigh–Redland Bay Road and Mount Cotton Road, likely resulting in increased traffic on those roads.

== Major intersections ==
All distances are from Google Maps.

LGA	Location	km	mi	Destinations	Notes
Logan	Loganholme	0– 0.25	0.0– 0.16	Pacific Motorway – north – Brisbane – south – Beenleigh	Western end of Beenleigh–Redland Bay Road (State Route 47)
Logan	Loganholme / Cornubia midpoint	1.3	0.81	Bryants Road – north–west – Tanah Merah	Three-way roundabout. Road continues east.
Logan	Cornubia	2.2	1.4	California Creek Road – north–east – Cornubia	Road continues south–east.
Logan	Cornubia / Carbrook midpoint	4.9	3.0	Mount Cotton Road – north–east – Mount Cotton; Skinners Road – south–west – Logan River	Road continues south–east.
Logan	Carbrook	5.7	3.5	Kruger Road – south – Carbrook school complex	Road continues south–east.
Redland	Redland Bay	11.8	7.3	Unnamed Road – Logan River	Name changes to Longland Road. Road continues north-east.
Redland	Redland Bay	12.4	7.7	Rocky Passage Road – Logan River	Name changes to Serpentine Creek Road. Road continues north.
Redland	Redland Bay	16.5	10.3	Cleveland–Redland Bay Road – north–west – Victoria Point, Thornlands, Cleveland; Serpentine Creek Road – north–east – Redland Bay	Eastern end of Beenleigh–Redland Bay Road. State Route 47 continues north–west as Cleveland–Redland Bay Road.
1.000 mi = 1.609 km; 1.000 km = 0.621 mi: Route transition

== See also ==
- List of road routes in Queensland
- List of numbered roads in Queensland
