= Alexander Clark Park, Loganholme =

Park in Logan City, Queensland, Australia

- Alex Clark Park
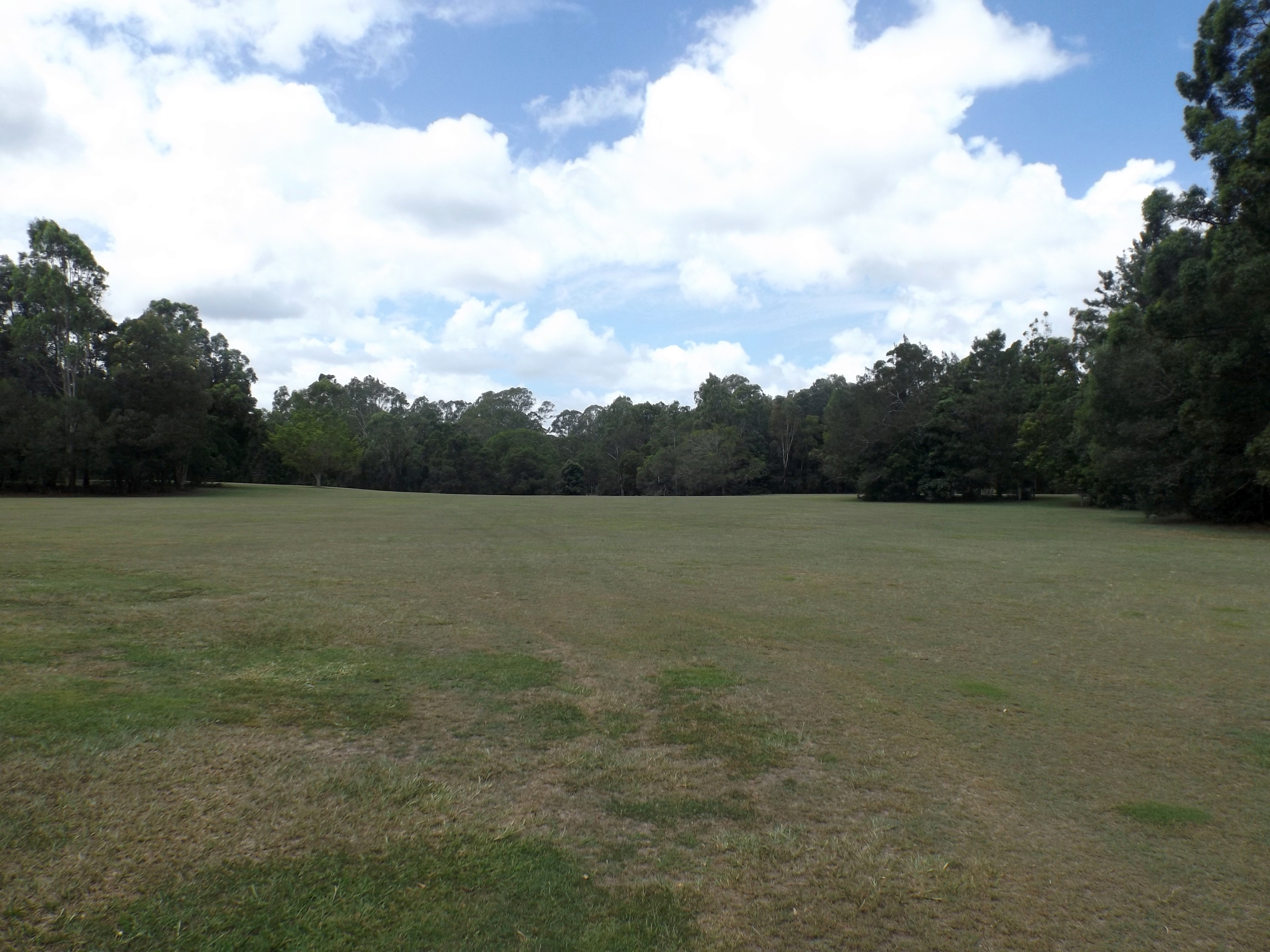
- 2016

- Location within Queensland
- Interactive map of Alexander Clark Park, Loganholme
- Type: Recreation, Native Flora
- Location: Loganholme, Queensland, Australia
- Coordinates: 27°42′05″S 153°11′24″E
- Area: 23 hectares (57 acres)
- Created: 1975
- Administrator: Logan City Council
- Website: Alexander Clark Park - Logan City Council

Alexander Clark Park, Loganholme is a recreation park featuring native flora in Logan City, Queensland, Australia. Facilities include walking and cycling paths, wheelchair access, dog off-leash areas, picnic tables and barbecues, children playgrounds, fitness equipment, and riverside pontoons. The Loganholme park occupies an inner bend of the Logan River upstream from the Pacific Motorway crossing and Logan River Parklands. Diverse and endangered tree species have been protected within the park.

== History ==
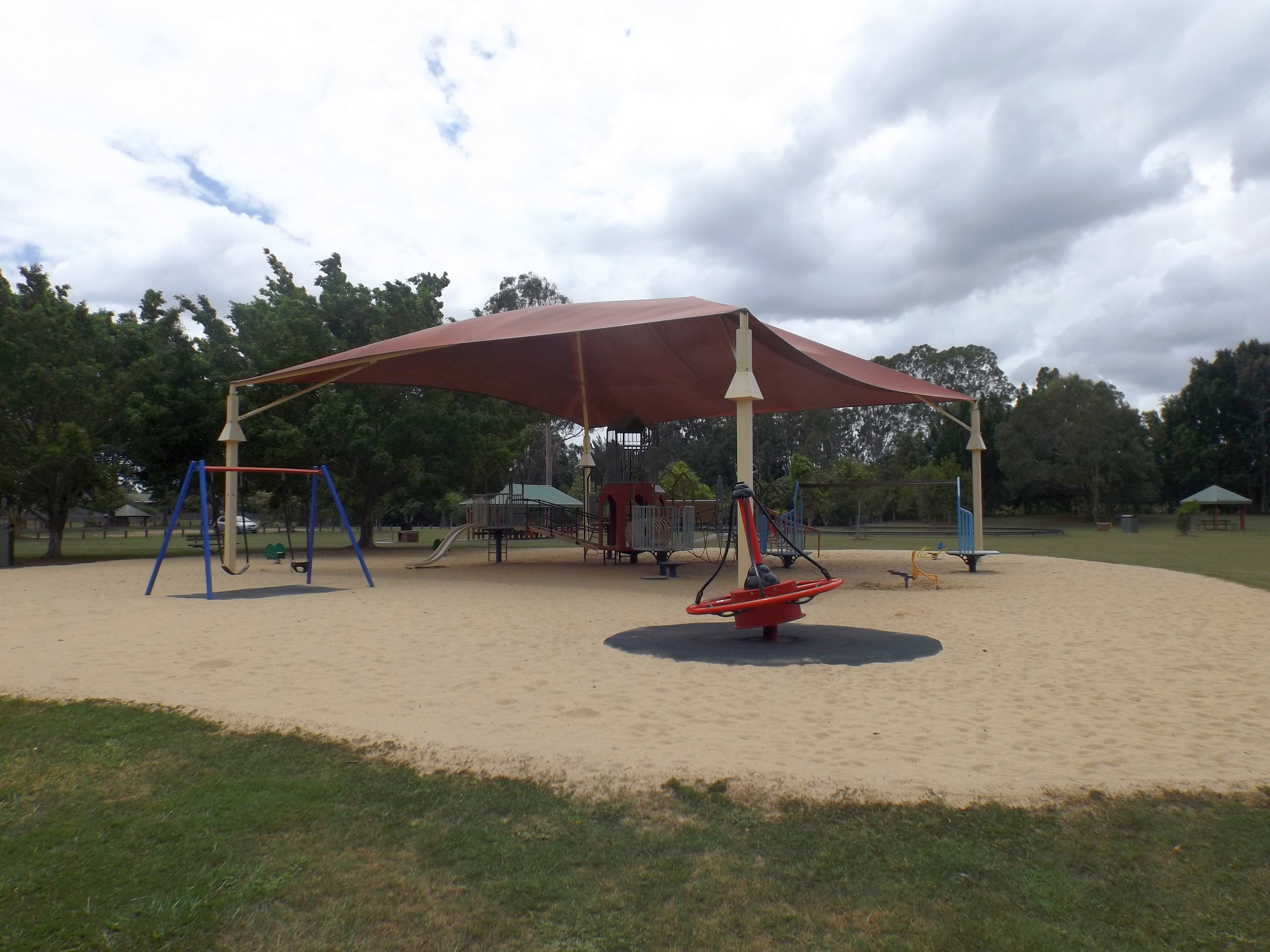
Playground

Situated in what is now the suburb of Loganholme, the park once formed part of 1,280 acres (518 ha) applied for by Thomas Oldham around 1862, under the government regulations of 1861 to encourage cotton growing. After subdivision, and establishment of the Loganholme Plantation to grow sugar cane by the surveyor William Fryar, the land was eventually purchased by the pastoralist James Tyson in 1876.

A housing estate development in the 1970s, Marana Gardens, included an area for the park which was named Alexander Clark Memorial Park in 1976 after the pioneer and former councillor for the Albert Shire; the site having once formed part of his family's property.

In 1981, the North Albert Bowhunters Club moved to the site, establishing a competition range and camping area; by 1983 however, there were difficulties with the council planning a public recreational facility. During the 1980s and 1990s an Australian Football playing field was located in the park, home to local football club the Cobra's.

The park has a bushcare group which was granted funds in 2003 under the National Landcare Programme to remove weeds along the river aiming to prevent erosion, plant native trees and help in the recovery of the endangered Angle-stemmed myrtle tree species.

== Native flora ==
Tree species which are native to the subtropical and warm temperate habitat of the Moreton Bay region can be seen in the park. Along with 200 year old blue gum trees (also known as forest red gums, Eucalyptus tereticornis), notable trees include:

	Common name^{[a]}	Labelled specimen^{[b]}
Aleurites moluccanus	candle nut	27.70133°S 153.19158°E
Alphitonia excelsa	soap tree	27.70163°S 153.19207°E
Alstonia scholaris	milky pine	27.70141°S 153.19156°E
Castanospermum australe	blackbean	27.70159°S 153.19207°E
Eucalyptus tereticornis	forest red gum	27.70153°S 153.19209°E
Ficus macrophylla	Moreton Bay fig	27.70178°S 153.19163°E
Flindersia schottiana	bumpy ash	27.70124°S 153.19173°E
Jagera pseudorhus	foam bark tree	27.70157°S 153.19207°E
Melaleuca bracteata	black tea-tree	27.7011°S 153.19158°E
Melaleuca viminalis	weeping bottlebrush	27.70137°S 153.19266°E
Melia azedarach	white cedar	27.70162°S 153.19263°E
Nauclea orientalis	Leichhardt tree	27.70123°S 153.19164°E

^{a} common names sourced from park labels
^{b} trees with botanical signs in the park

=== Angle-stemmed myrtle ===
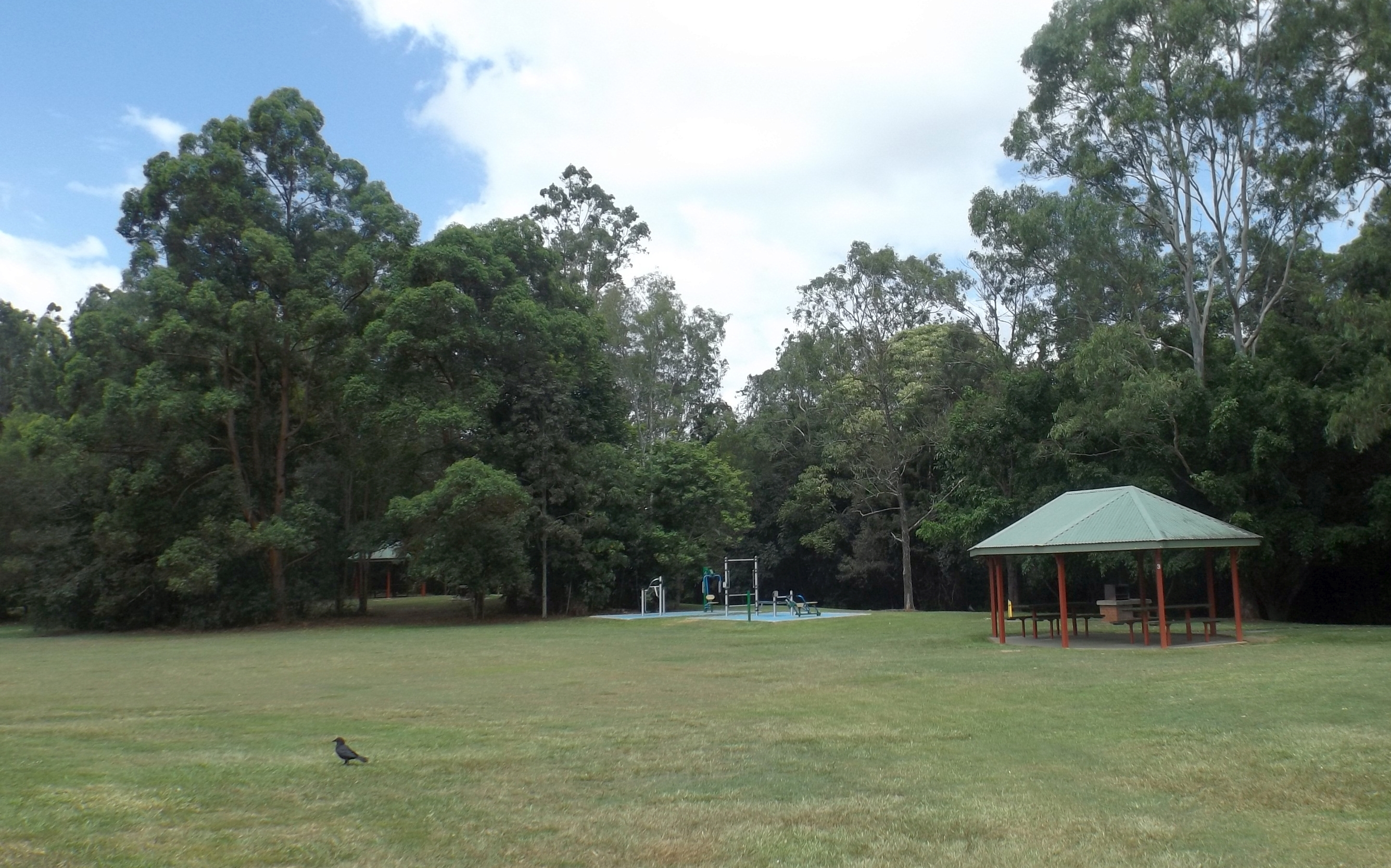
Exercise equipment and covered tables

The park is one nine localities known for original populations of the endangered Gossia gonoclada (synonym Austromyrtus gonoclada) of the myrtle family, found only in the Moreton Bay region. Two naturally occurring G. gonoclada trees are recorded in the park, with a further 31 having been planted as part of a recovery plan for the species.
