= Cornubia, Queensland =

Cornubia
- Suburb
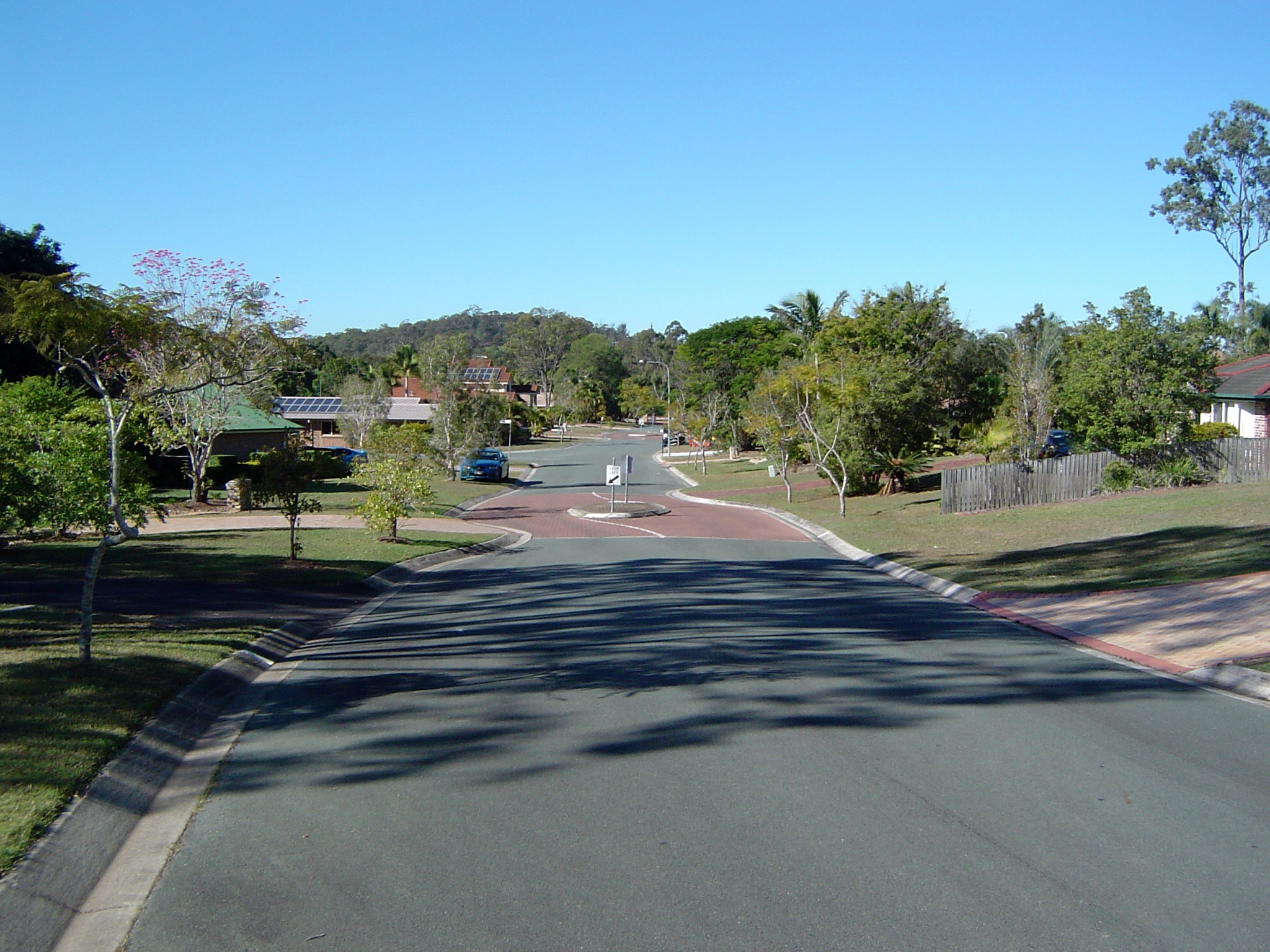
- Gavin Way, 2014

- Interactive map of Cornubia
- Coordinates: 27.6599°S 153.2138°E
- Country: Australia
- State: Queensland
- City: Logan City
- LGA: Logan City
- Location: 13.2 km (8.2 mi) SE of Logan Central; 31.6 km (19.6 mi) SE of Brisbane CBD

Government
  - State electorate: Macalister
  - Federal division: Forde

Area
  - Total: 14.9 km^{2} (5.8 sq mi)

Population
  - Total: 7,810 (2021 census)
  - Density: 524.2/km^{2} (1,358/sq mi)
- Time zone: UTC+10:00 (AEST)
- Postcode: 4130
Suburbs around Cornubia
Mount Cotton	Mount Cotton	Mount Cotton
Shailer Park	Cornubia	Carbrook
Loganholme	Eagleby	Carbrook

Cornubia is a suburb in the City of Logan, Queensland, Australia. In the 2021 census, Cornubia had a population of 7,810 people.

== Geography ==
Cornubia is situated 28 kilometres (17 mi) south-east of the Brisbane central business district. Many street names reflect its lush bush setting (e.g. Sugarwood, Parkview). The Beenleigh–Redland Bay Road runs through the south of the locality from west to east.

== History ==
Cornubia was originally named Cornubia Park, getting its name from the property's owners in the 1920s, during this time, it was a large farm, with timber getting, dairying, crops of corn, oats and barley being the main activities carried out. In September 1934, the land was purchased by the Jessens, and they changed the name of the property to Cornubia. The land was sold again in 1956 and was subdivided into smaller lots. By the early 1980's residential development was apparent.

Cornubia was named as a bounded locality by Queensland Place Names Board on 1 May 1975. Cornubia is the Latin name for Cornwall.

St Matthew's Catholic Primary School opened on 23 January 1984 with 57 students in Years 1 through 3 with the support of the Sisters of St Joseph of the Sacred Heart in the tradition of Mary MacKillop.

Chisholm Catholic College opened in 1992.

== Demographics ==
In the 2011 census, Cornubia had a population of 6,833 people, 49.9% female and 50.1% male. The median age of the Cornubia population was 37 years, the same as the national median. 70.2% of people living in Cornubia were born in Australia. The other top responses for country of birth were England 7%, New Zealand 6.4%, Scotland 1.7%, South Africa 1.5%, Germany 0.7%. 88.9% of people spoke only English at home; the next most common languages were 0.7% Mandarin, 0.6% Afrikaans, 0.5% German, 0.4% Dutch, 0.4% Greek.

In the 2016 census, Cornubia had a population of 7,317 people, 51% female and 49% male. The median age of the Cornubia population was 38 years, on par with the national median of 38. 71.5% of people living in Cornubia were born in Australia. The other top responses for country of birth were England 6.4%, New Zealand 5.7%, South Africa 1.5%, Scotland 1.0%, and Philippines 0.6%. 87.3% of people spoke only English at home, the next most common languages were 0.7% Mandarin, 0.5% Greek, 0.5% Afrikaans, 0.4% German, and 0.4% Spanish.

In the 2021 census, Cornubia recorded a population of 7,810 people, 50.3% female and 49.7% male. The median age of the Cornubia population was 40 years, 2 years above the national median of 38. 73.2% of people living in Cornubia were born in Australia. The other top responses for country of birth were England 6.3%, New Zealand 5.1%, South Africa 1.5%, Scotland 1.0% and India 0.8%. 88.6% of people spoke only English at home, the next most common languages were 0.9% Mandarin, 0.4% Punjabi, 0.4% Afrikaans, 0.4% Spanish, and 0.3% German.

== Education ==
St Matthew's School is a Catholic primary (Prep–6) school for boys and girls at 172-180 Bryants Road (27.6671°S 153.1891°E). In 2017, the school had an enrolment of 552 students with 37 teachers (32 full-time equivalent) and 28 non-teaching staff (17 full-time equivalent).

Chisholm Catholic College is a Catholic secondary (7–12) school for boys and girls at 204 California Creek Road (27.6663°S 153.2045°E). In 2017, the school had an enrolment of 937 students with 72 teachers (69 full-time equivalent) and 45 non-teaching staff (34 full-time equivalent).

There are no government schools in Cornubia. The nearest government primary schools are Carbrook State School in neighbouring Carbrook to the south-east, Shailer Park State School in neighbouring Shailer Park to the west, and Mount Cotton State School in neighbouring Mount Cotton to the north. The nearest government secondary school is Shailer Park State High School in Shailer Park.

== Fauna ==
Cornubia is part of the Koala Coast and is home to hundreds of Australian native animals including koalas, wallabies, goannas and various species of birds (e.g. rainbow lorikeet).

== Cornubia Forest Nature Refuge ==
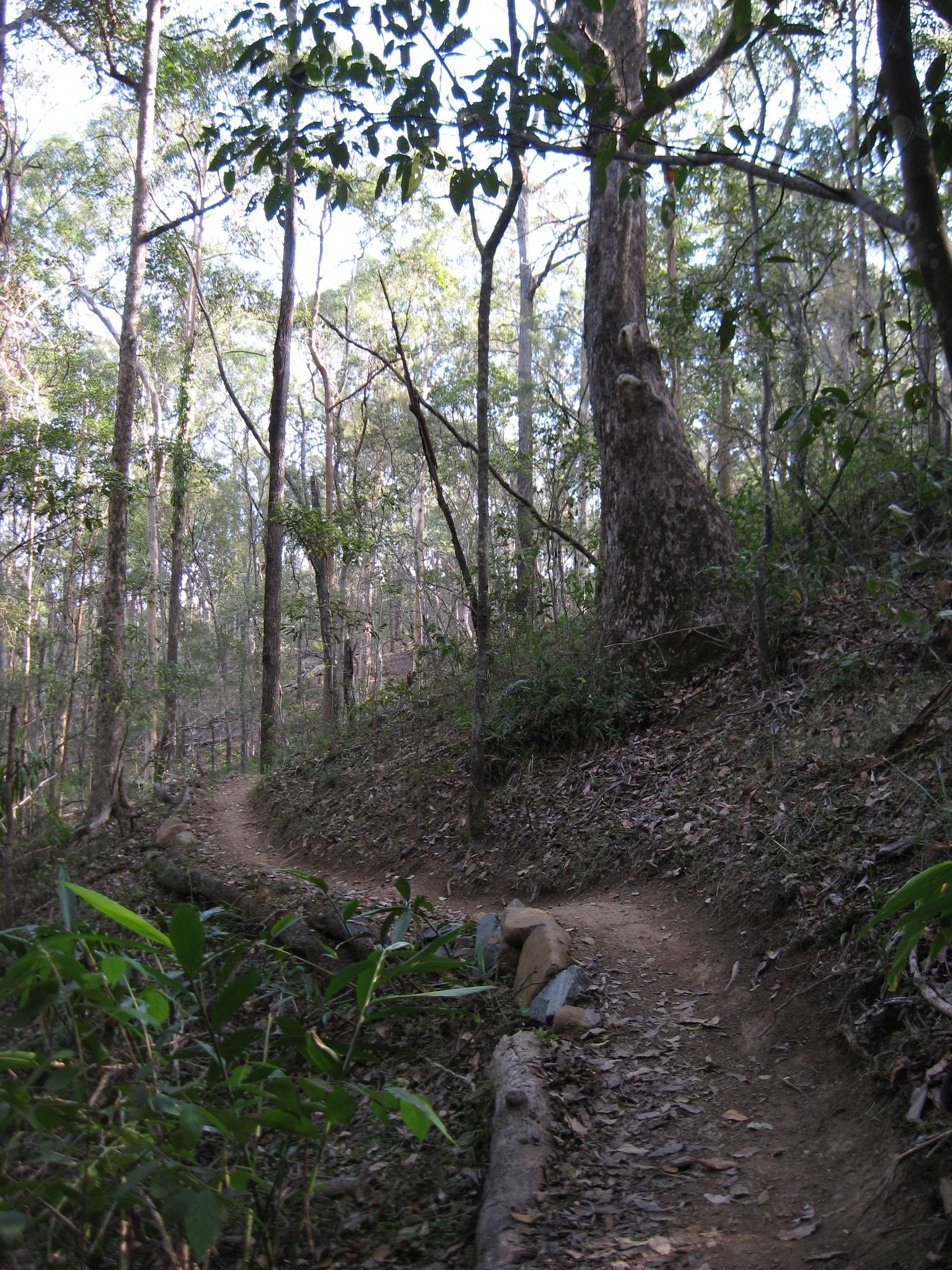
Walking and biking track in the Cornubia Forest Nature Refuge

A protected nature conservation area was created by the local government council from land purchased between 1999 and 2010. Located in the north-west of the suburb, the 196-hectare (480-acre) nature refuge consists of the former Cornubia Forest Park to the south and land known as the Cornubia Escarpment in the north. It is managed as part of Australia’s National Reserve System with objectives that include both conservation of flora and fauna, and recreation such as bushwalking and mountain bike riding. The refuge is also managed under a Koala Nature Refuge Agreement with the state government. The tall open forest ecosystem of blackbutt (Eucalyptus pilularis) and the brown thornbill (Acanthiza pusilla) in the area are described as endangered.

== Transport ==
Over 70% of employed people travel by car as most residents work in Brisbane City or at the Gold Coast. Buses are available in the area and are provided by the Logan City Bus Service, a privately owned company.
