= Shailer Park, Queensland =

Shailer Park
- Suburb
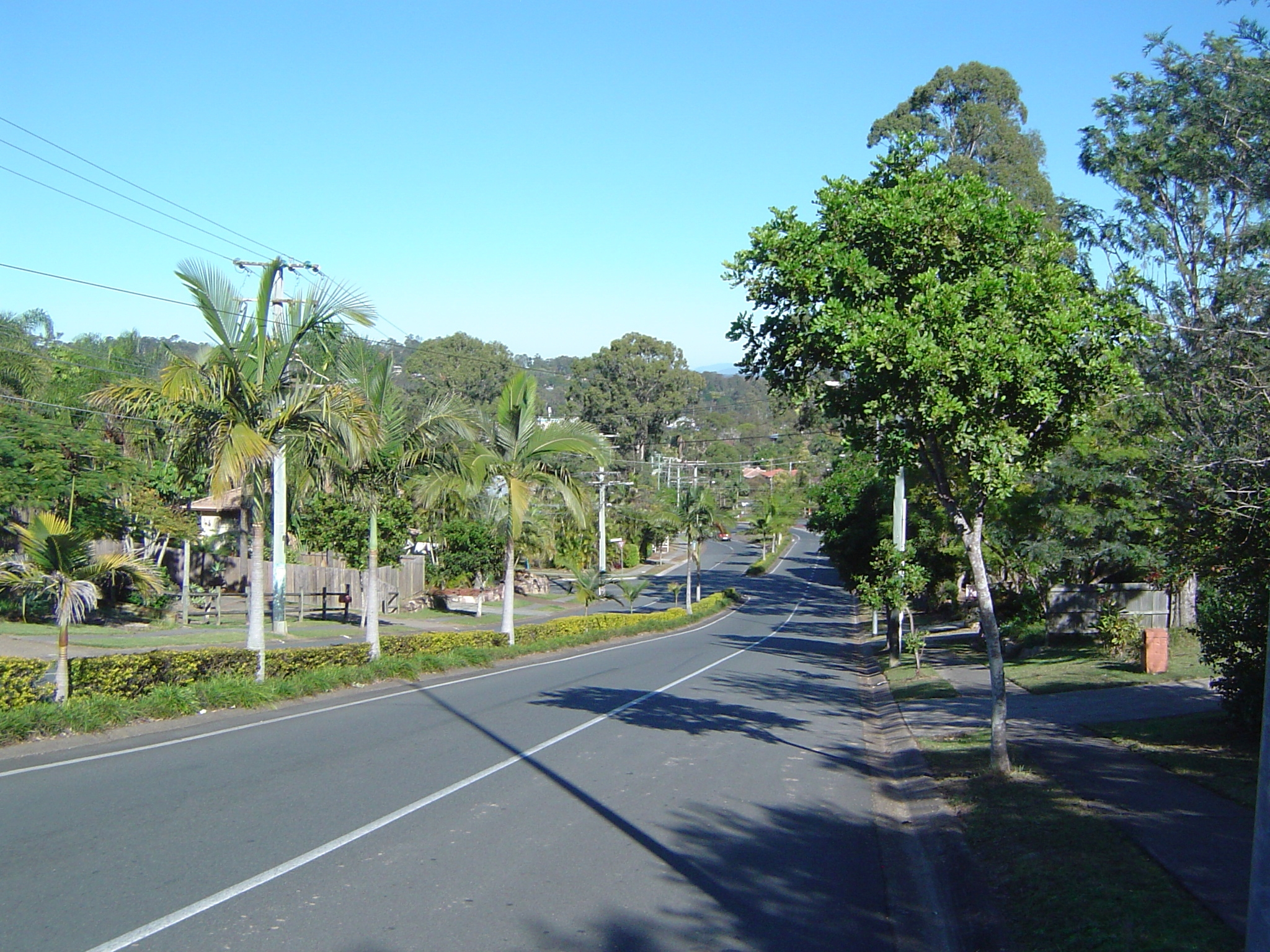
- Plantain Road, 2014

- Interactive map of Shailer Park
- Coordinates: 27.6505°S 153.1755°E
- Country: Australia
- State: Queensland
- City: City of Logan
- LGA: City of Logan
- Location: 9.4 km (5.8 mi) E of Logan Central; 29.1 km (18.1 mi) SSE of Brisbane CBD

Government
  - State electorate: Springwood
  - Federal division: Forde

Area
  - Total: 8.1 km^{2} (3.1 sq mi)

Population
  - Total: 12,182 (2021 census)
  - Density: 1,504/km^{2} (3,895/sq mi)
- Time zone: UTC+10:00 (AEST)
- Postcode: 4128
Suburbs around Shailer Park
Daisy Hill	Mount Cotton	Mount Cotton
Slacks Creek	Shailer Park	Cornubia
Tanah Merah	Loganholme	Cornubia

Shailer Park is a suburb in the City of Logan, Queensland, Australia. In the 2021 census, Shailer Park had a population of 12,182 people.

== Geography ==
Shailer Park is a suburb of mainly middle class residential areas, and sits on hilly terrain between the Pacific Motorway and extensive forest and bushland to the north. The north-eastern part of the suburb is sometimes known as Kimberley Park, after a residential estate located in the area.

Shailer Park is a centre for employment, entertainment, and leisure in southeast Queensland. The Logan Hyperdome, a major regional shopping centre, is located in Shailer Park, and other commercial and community facilities have developed nearby. Largely because of this, the Queensland Government listed the suburb as a major activity centre in the South East Queensland Regional Plan 2005–2026. The Loganholme bus station, a major bus interchange is located at the Logan Hyperdome.

== History ==
The suburb is named after Francis Frederick Rising Shailer and his wife Catherine, who arrived with their children in the area in 1866. Like many farmers in the area, they first grew cotton and later sugar. The Shailers were probably best known for their fruit growing and operated the first citrus orchard in southern Queensland, situated in Slacks Creek. The land selected by Francis Shailer was situated to the north of the current Shailer Road. Francis Shailer was a teacher at the first and second Slacks Creek Provisional Schools. He was also the first Clerk of the Tingalpa Divisional Board in 1880. The Shailers intermarried with other pioneering families in the district including the Dennis family, who were related to the Markwells, as well as the Murrays, who had an adjoining property along the Logan River. The property still exists at the end of Murrays Road.

Francis’ son Alfred later farmed the area now known as Daisy Hill. At that time it was called Oakey Mountain and was owned by his grandfather, James Dennis. Alf's son Glen Shailer also farmed this property. Glen carried on the family's tradition of involvement in local government. He was elected to the Albert Shire Council in 1961 and served almost continuously until 1985. He was elected Mayor of Logan City in 1982 and served for one term.

Shailer Park was originally named as a district on 1 September 1971, then as a sub-district of Slacks Creek on 1 September 1977. It was named and bounded as a locality on 31 March 1979 and revised to be a suburb on 31 August 1991.

The Kimberley Park estate was developed in 1973.

Shailer Park State High School opened on 29 January 1980.

Shailer Park State School opened on 25 January 1982.

Kimberley Park State School opened 29 January 1985.

The Logan Hyperdome shopping centre opened in 1989 on the site of the former Wild Waters Water Slide Park.

The Logan Hyperdome Library opened in 1998 with a major refurbishment in 2014.

== Demographics ==
Historical population
Year	Pop.	±%
2001	10,771	—
2006	11,223	+4.2%
2011	11,275	+0.5%
2016	11,759	+4.3%
2021	12,182	+3.6%

In the 2011 census, Shailer Park recorded a population of 11,275 people, 50.3% female and 49.7% male. The median age of the Shailer Park population was 36 years, 1 year below the national median of 37. 68.5% of people living in Shailer Park were born in Australia. The other top responses for country of birth were New Zealand 8.7%, England 6.8%, South Africa 1.7%, Scotland 0.9%, Philippines 0.7%. 88.7% of people spoke only English at home; the next most common languages were 0.6% Afrikaans, 0.6% Mandarin, 0.5% Samoan, 0.5% Greek, 0.5% Spanish.

In the 2016 census, Shailer Park had a population of 11,759 people.

In the 2021 census, Shailer Park had a population of 12,182 people, 50.3% female and 49.7% male. The median age of the Shailer Park population was 39 years, 1 year over the national median of 38. 68.4% of people living in Shailer Park were born in Australia. The other top responses for country of birth were New Zealand 6.8%, England 5.1%, South Africa 1.6%, China 1.2% and India 1.0%. 82.8% of people spoke only English at home; the next most common languages were 1.6% Mandarin, 1.0% Korean, 0.8% Hindi, 0.7% Greek and 0.6% Afrikaans.

== Education ==
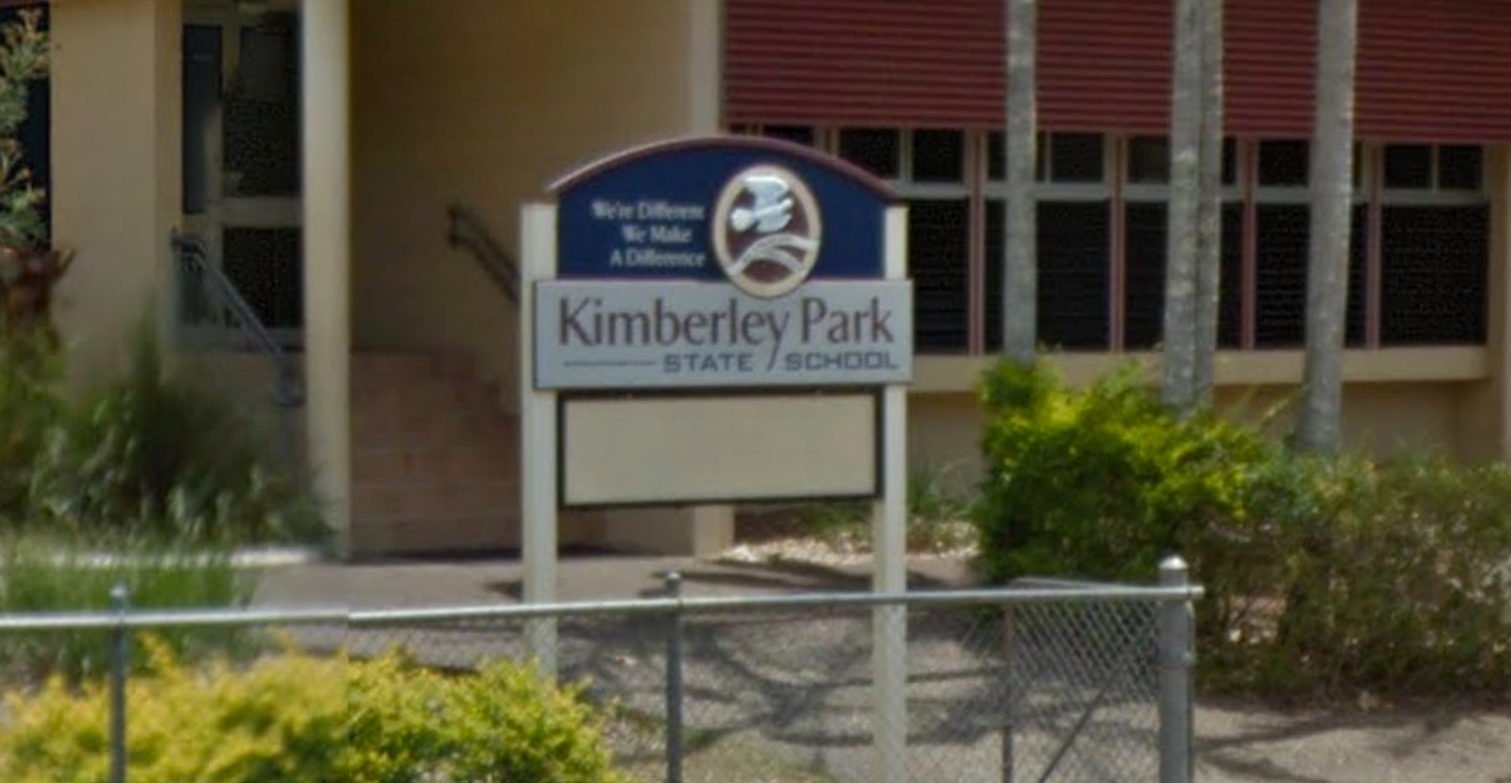
Kimberley Park State School, 2015

Shailer Park State School is a government primary (Prep–6) school for boys and girls at Bulwarna Street (27.6602°S 153.1871°E). In 2018, the school had an enrolment of 530 students with 37 teachers (33 full-time equivalent) and 22 non-teaching staff (14 full-time equivalent). It includes a special education program.

Kimberley Park State School is a government primary (Prep–6) school for boys and girls at Floret Street (27.6473°S 153.1773°E). In 2018, the school had an enrolment of 868 students with 67 teachers (59 full-time equivalent) and 28 non-teaching staff (19 full-time equivalent). It includes a special education program.

Shailer Park State High School is a government secondary (7–12) school for boys and girls at Leaf Street (27.6620°S 153.1867°E). In 2018, the school had an enrolment of 913 students with 80 teachers (75 full-time equivalent) and 29 non-teaching staff (23 full-time equivalent). It includes a special education program

== Amenities ==
The Logan City Council operate the Logan Hyperdome Library at the Logan Hyperdome.
