= Chisholm Catholic College (Cornubia) =

Secondary school in Queensland, Australia

- Crest of Chisholm Catholic College

Location
- Built on the land of the Yugembah, Yuggera and Quandamuka Language peoples. Cornubia, Queensland; Australia; 27°39′59.02″S 153°12′15.38″E

Information
- Type: Private, co-educational
- Motto: "Live Christ's Challenge"
- Denomination: Roman Catholic
- Established: 1992
- Principal: Damian Bottaccio
- Enrolment: 939 (2023)
- Colours: Green; Maroon; White
- Website: www.chisholm.qld.edu.au

Chisholm Catholic College is an independent, Roman Catholic, co-educational, secondary school, located in the Logan City suburb of Cornubia, in Queensland, Australia. It is administered by the Queensland Catholic Education Commission, with an enrolment of 939 students and a teaching staff of 71, as of 2023. The school serves students from Year 7 to Year 12.

== Background ==
The school was established on 1 January 1992, and was situated on an 11-hectare (27-acre) site, with an initial enrolment of 60 Year 8 students and eleven staff housed in three buildings and became one of the first private schools in the district.

The founding principal was Mike Ashton. Christopher Leadbetter was Principal in 2014. Martina Millard was Principal from 2015 to 2018. The college's current principal is Damian Bottaccio.

=== Caroline Chisholm ===
Caroline Chisholm inspired many people through her charity work and her kind nature. Her focus was on the education and employment of female immigrants. It is because of her efforts that she was selected to become the patron of the college.

== Houses ==
Chisholm Catholic College students are allocated to one of six houses, each named after a notable Australian. Originally, there were only four houses, but Oodgeroo became the fifth House voted by students and beating Dunlop (Australian war hero Edward Dunlop). Mitchell House was added in 2018. The houses are:

- Flynn, named after John Flynn, founder of Australia's Royal Flying Doctor Service. The house colour is blue. John Flynn is also depicted on the $20 Australian bill.
- Mackillop, named after Mary MacKillop, founder of the Sisters of Saint Joseph who has been named as Australia's first saint. The house colour is yellow.
- Namatjira, named after Albert Namatjira, renowned landscape artist. The house colour is red.
- Oodgeroo, named after Oodgeroo Noonuccal (aka Kath Walker), poet. The house colour is purple.
- Parer, named after Damien Parer, wartime correspondent and photographer. The house colour is green.
- Mitchell, named after Roma Mitchell, the first female judge in Australia, the house colour is orange.

== Buildings ==
Chisholm Catholic College has 14 buildings, most named after Australian native flora.

- Acacia was one of the school's original buildings prior to renovation. It is now the school's administration block.
- Banksia is a general use block with four classrooms and toilets.
- Cassia was the second of Chisholm's original buildings and originally housed four science labs. A fifth lab has since been added.
- Caroline Chisholm Centre is a multipurpose air-conditioned building complete with kitchen. It is used for hospitality functions, form meetings and liturgies. The board room forms part of the building.
- Dianella is a recent addition, better known as the 'Dining Room' and is a restaurant style kitchen which is used for hospitality-based events and functions, plus a dining room where students often present and serve food.
- Eucalyptus was the third of Chisholm's original buildings. It now houses two art rooms and a computer lab, with a hospitality kitchen, dining room and textiles room. It also contains toilets.
- Flindersia is a new building encompassing the latest in learning tools. Almost all surfaces in the room are able to be used to draw or write on. There are eight classrooms in this building.
- Grevillea is a general use block. There are eight classrooms.
- Hakea contains three computer laboratories, the business room and the Behaviour Support Centre, or BSC for short.
- Ixora is the school's library and resource centre. It has a large collection of fiction and non-fiction books for student borrowing, and a non-fiction library in the upstairs section for reference. It is also home to the Hampton Cafe.
- Jasminium is a general use block, containing the school counsellor's office and learning enrichment room. There are six general use classrooms and toilets.
- Kingfisher Canteen is a stand-alone building with a self-select area and two cash registers, it is a franchise of H&H Canteens.
- Melaleuca is a large undercover area. It is used for PE classes and sporting activities. Recent building works have expanded this building considerable, and it now houses two PE classrooms, two full-size courts, a stage area, change rooms and a gymnasium.
- Father Gary Russell Centre, another new building, houses music and drama classrooms equipped with the latest technology, including a music recording studio and a drama stage with lighting and sound equipment.
- Westringia is the school's manual arts block, featuring two manual arts rooms and a graphics room.
