= Loganholme State School =

Primary school in Queensland, Australia

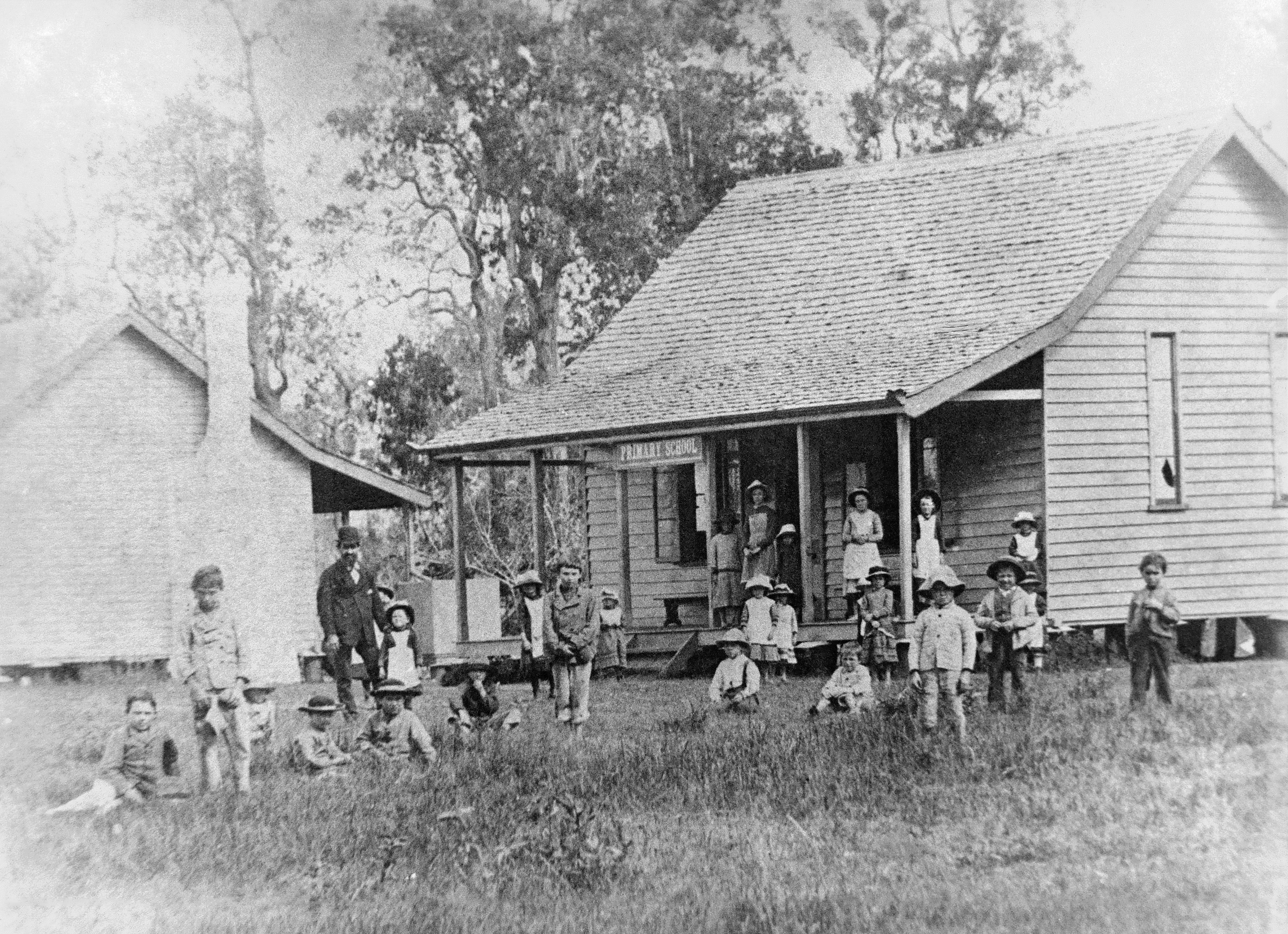
- Original School Building, 1895

Location
- Wandilla Crescent; Loganholme, Queensland; 27.686275°S 153.180808°E

Information
- School type: Public co-educational primary
- Motto: Believe and Achieve
- Established: 1873
- Principal: Sonya Wilson
- Teaching staff: 39 (2024)
- Years offered: Prep – Year 6
- Enrolment: 528 (2024)
- Website: Official site

Loganholme State School is a public co-educational primary school located in the Logan City suburb of Loganholme within Queensland, Australia. It is administered by the Queensland Department of Education, with an enrolment of 528 students and a teaching staff of thirty-nine as of 2024. The school serves students from Prep to Year 6.

== Location ==
The school was originally located near Cotton Company's Road (now part of the Logan Motorway) facing the Pacific Highway until it was relocated to Wandilla Crescent in 1974. The construction of the new school was estimated to cost $147,000 in 1973.

== History ==
A school was petitioned for within the region in 1871. The school opened on 25 May 1873 with an initial 37 students (17 boys and 20 girls) enrolled and David Freeman as the Head Teacher. By 1874, the school had 21 boys, and 23 girls (44) enrolled.

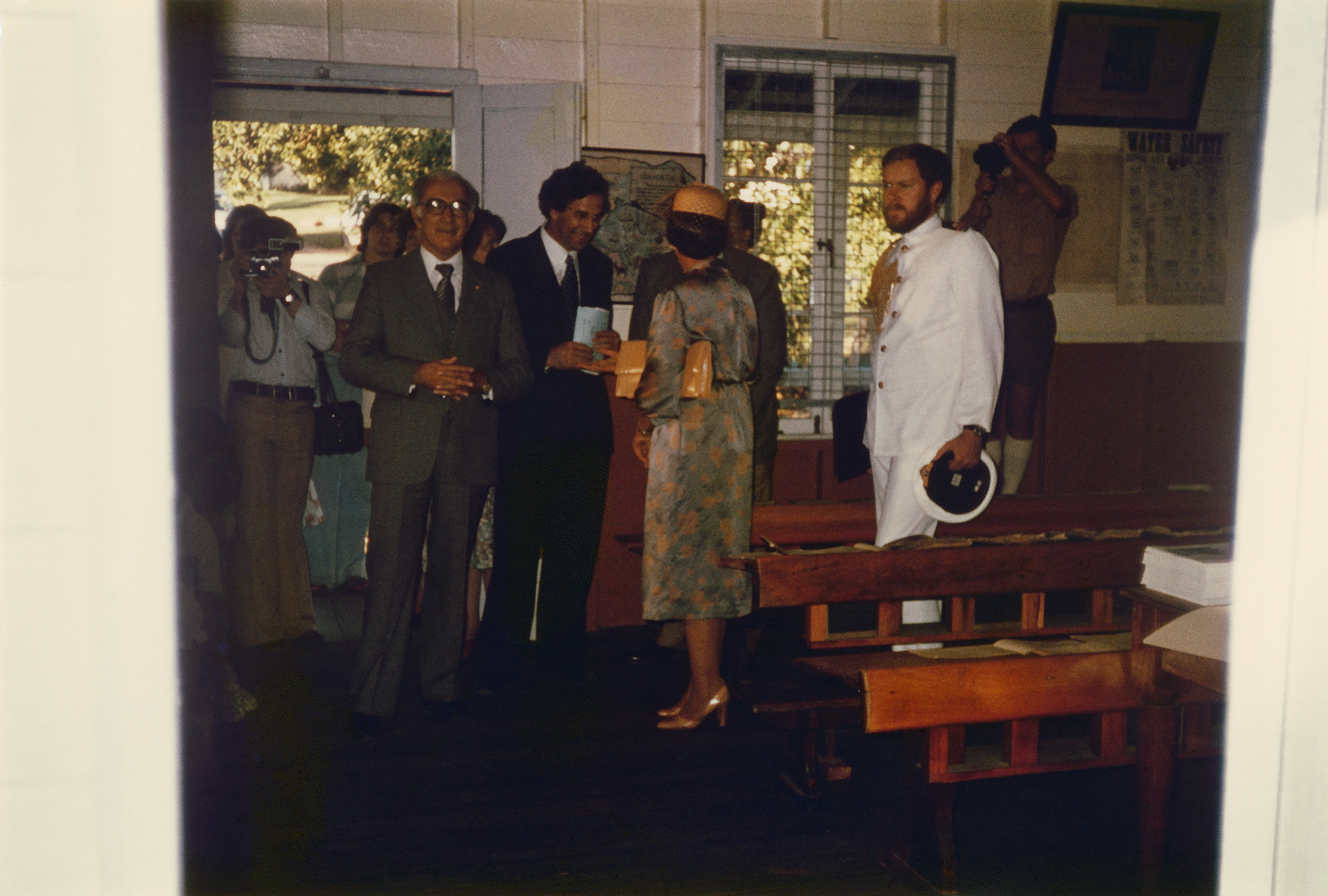
Opening of the museum at Kelvin Grove College, 1976

The closure of the original school occurred on 28 February 1890 but reopened two months later in April as a Provisional school. The school was reopened as a State School on 23 January 1893 after the closure of the Provisional school.

After the school was moved to its current location, the original school building was moved to Kelvin Grove College in 1975 as a museum; the Minister of Education, Valmond Bird, officially opened it on 8 April 1976. After being donated, the building was moved back to Logan in 2009 to the Beenleigh Historical Village, where it currently resides. It was opened for use at the historical village on 30 July 2010, to teach the history of the Beenleigh region to current school kids.

In May 2024, the school was sent into lockdown after a man was discovered wondering the school grounds wielding an axe. While the man did not approach any students, he was arrested and taken into custody.

== Demographics ==
In 2022, the school had a student enrolment of 574 students with 39 teachers (35.5 full-time equivalent) and 27 non-teaching staff (16.7 full-time equivalent). Female enrolments consisted of 275 students and Male enrolments consisted of 299 students; Indigenous enrolments accounted for a total of 7% and 12% of students had a language background other than English.

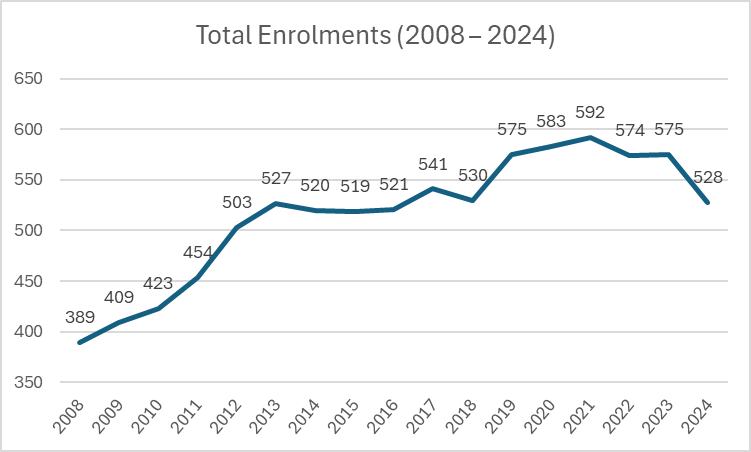
Loganholme State School Enrolment Data from 2008 to 2024.

In 2023, the school had a student enrolment of 575 students with 38 teachers (35.3 full-time equivalent) and 26 non-teaching staff (17.3 full-time equivalent). Female enrolments consisted of 274 students and Male enrolments consisted of 301 students; Indigenous enrolments accounted for a total of 9% and 12% of students had a language background other than English.

In 2024, the school had a student enrolment of 528 students with 39 teachers (36.2 full-time equivalent) and 25 non-teaching staff (16.8 full-time equivalent). Female enrolments consisted of 245 students and Male enrolments consisted of 283 students; Indigenous enrolments accounted for a total of 9% and 13% of students had a language background other than English.

== See also ==
- Education in Queensland
- List of schools in Greater Brisbane
