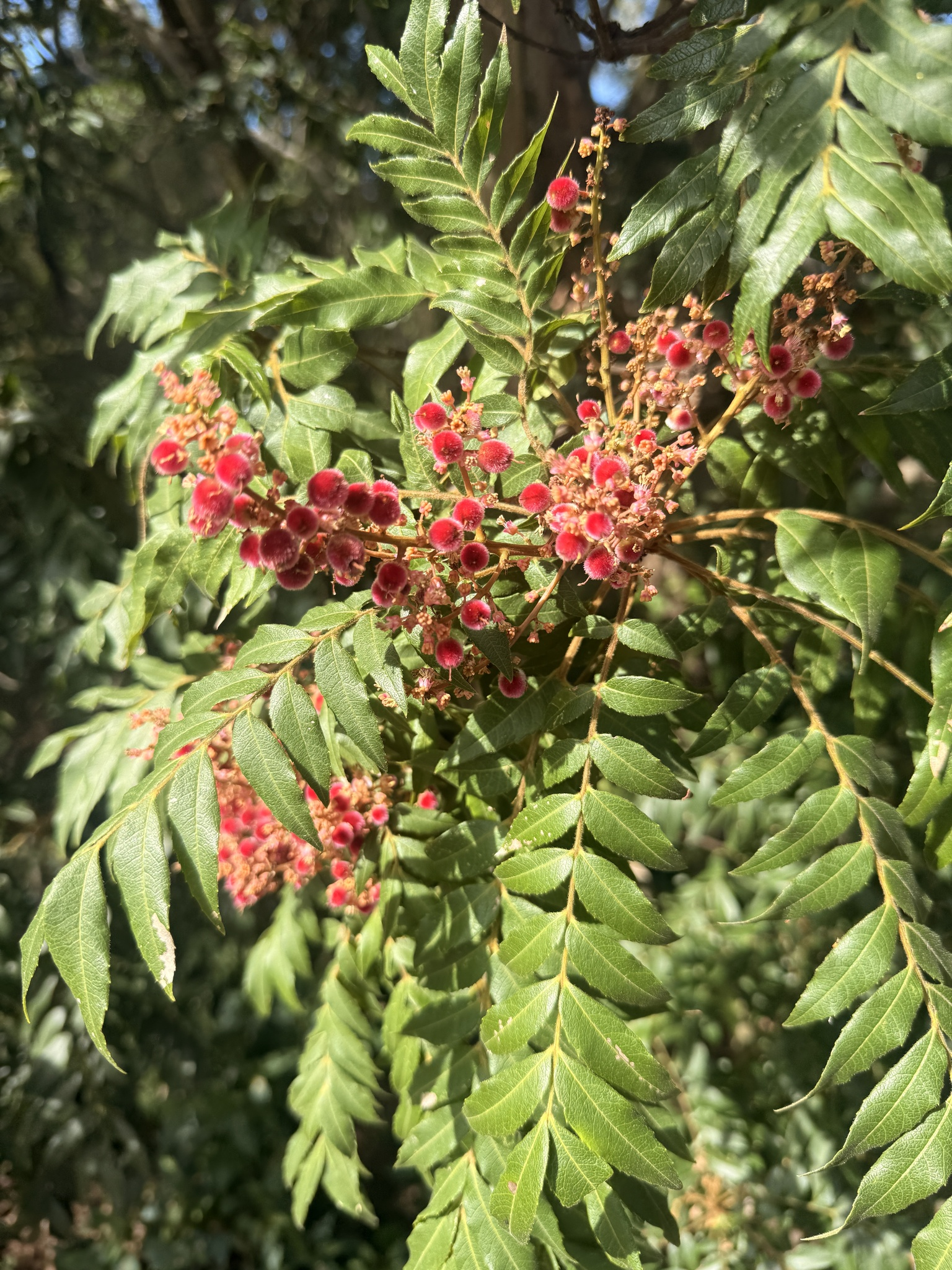
- Fruiting in Brisbane, Australia

Conservation status
- Least Concern (IUCN 3.1)

Scientific classification
- Kingdom: Plantae
- Clade: Tracheophytes
- Clade: Angiosperms
- Clade: Eudicots
- Clade: Rosids
- Order: Sapindales
- Family: Sapindaceae
- Genus: Jagera
- Species: J. pseudorhus

Binomial name
- Jagera pseudorhus (A.Rich.) Radlk.

Synonyms
- Cupania pseudorhus A.Rich.

= Jagera pseudorhus =

Species of flowering plant

Jagera pseudorhus, commonly known as foambark or fern-leaved tamarind, is a species of plant in the lychee family Sapindaceae, native to New Guinea and the northern half of eastern Australia. It is known for the foam that appears on the trunk after heavy rain.

== Description ==
Jagera pseudorhus is a shrub or small tree up to about 18 m (59 ft) in height and a trunk diameter of about 30 cm (12 in). The branches and petioles (leaf stems) may be lightly or densely hairy. The leaves are arranged alternately along the branches and are pinnately divided, with four to nine pairs of leaflets. The individual leaflets are slightly curved along the midrib, with on side being slightly broader than the other. They measure between 3 and 11 cm (1.2 and 4.3 in) long and 2 and 3 cm (0.79 and 1.18 in) wide, and the margins may be either toothed or smooth.

Flowers occur in panicles which appear near the tips of the branches and may be up to 25 cm (9.8 in) long and wide. Flowers are small, with petals about 2 mm (0.08 in) long. The fruit is a yellow-brown capsule about 15 mm (0.59 in) wide and long, covered in small stiff irritating hairs.

== Distribution and habitat ==
In Australia, the native range is along the eastern seaboard from Myall Lakes, New South Wales, north to the tip of Cape York Peninsula, Queensland. In New Guinea they occur in the portion of the island nearest Cape York. They occur in drier rainforest types such as monsoon forest, gallery forest and beach forest, at altitudes from sea level to 850 m (2,790 ft).

== Taxonomy ==
This species was first described as Cupania pseudorhus in 1834 by French botanist Achille Richard. It was later transferred to the genus Jagera by Ludwig Adolph Timotheus Radlkofer, as published in the journal Sitzungsberichte der mathematisch-physikalischen Classe der K. b. Akademie der Wissenschaften zu München. Radlkofer also described two forms, J. p. genuina and J. p. pilosiuscula), neither of which are now accepted.

In 1981, Australian botanist Sally T. Reynolds published a description of a new variety, Jagera pseudorhus var. integerrima, in the journal Austrobaileya. It differs from the standard variety – referred to by the autonym Jagera pseudorhus var. pseudorhus – in having leaflets that are always entire (or almost entire), and is endemic to the Atherton Tableland.

=== Etymology ===
The genus Jagera was named after Herbert de Jager, a botanical collector for German botanist Georg Eberhard Rumphius. The species epithet pseudorhus was created by combining the prefix 'pseudo-' (false) with the genus name Rhus, as a reference to the similarity of the foliage.

=== Common names ===
This species has several common names, thus: fern leaved tamarind, fern-leaved tamarind, fern tree, ferntree, fern top, foambark, foambark tree, foambark-tree, pink foambark and pink tamarind.

== Ecology ==
The seeds are eaten by Lewin's honeyeaters, shrike-tits, koels and regent and satin bowerbirds.

== Uses ==
Indigenous Australians use foam from crushed bark or leaves as a fish poison. It was also used as a soap in New Guinea. The timber has been used to make tool handles, and honey is harvested from the tree.

== Gallery ==
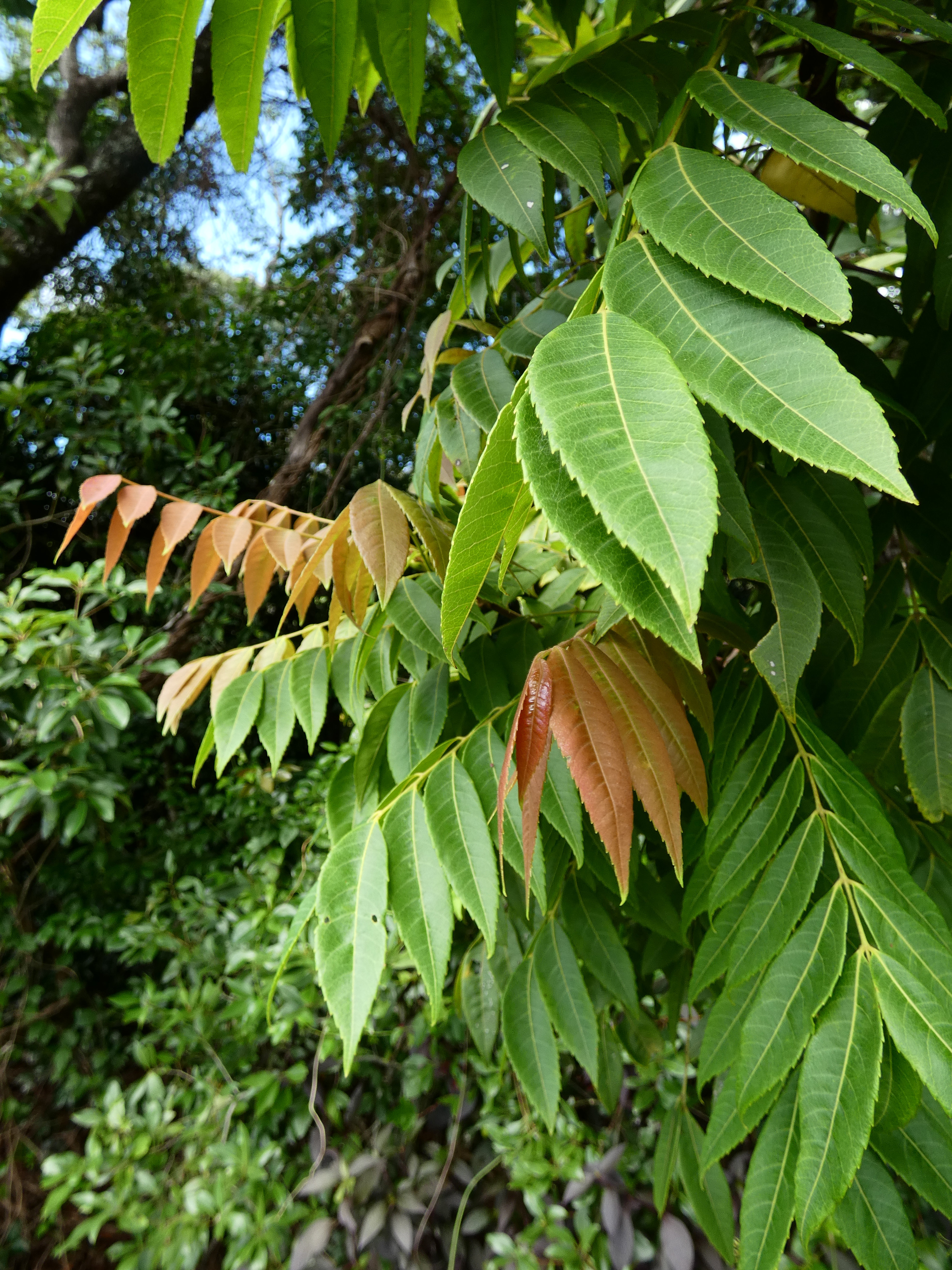
Leaflets detail

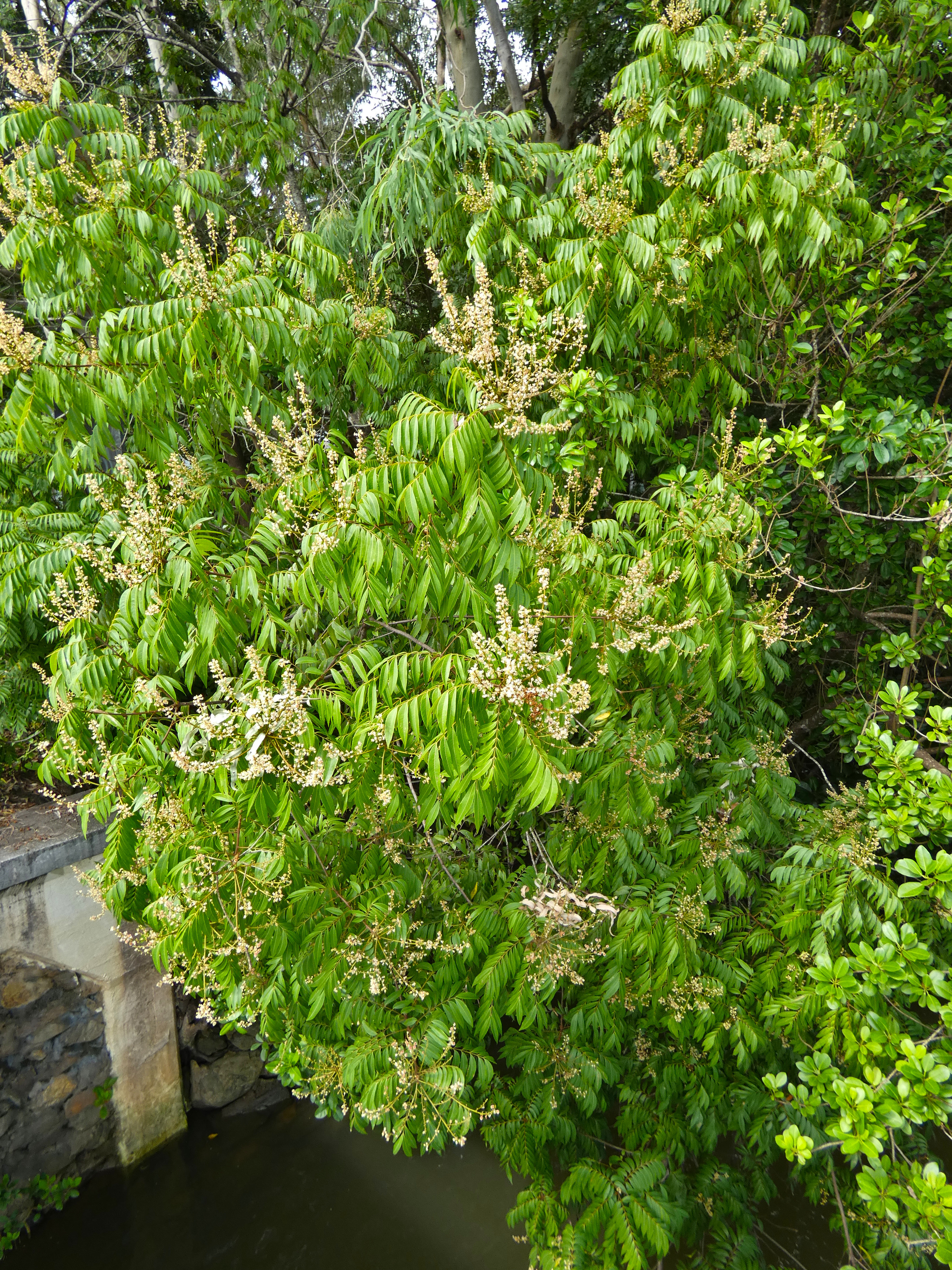
Flowering beside the Barron River in Cairns

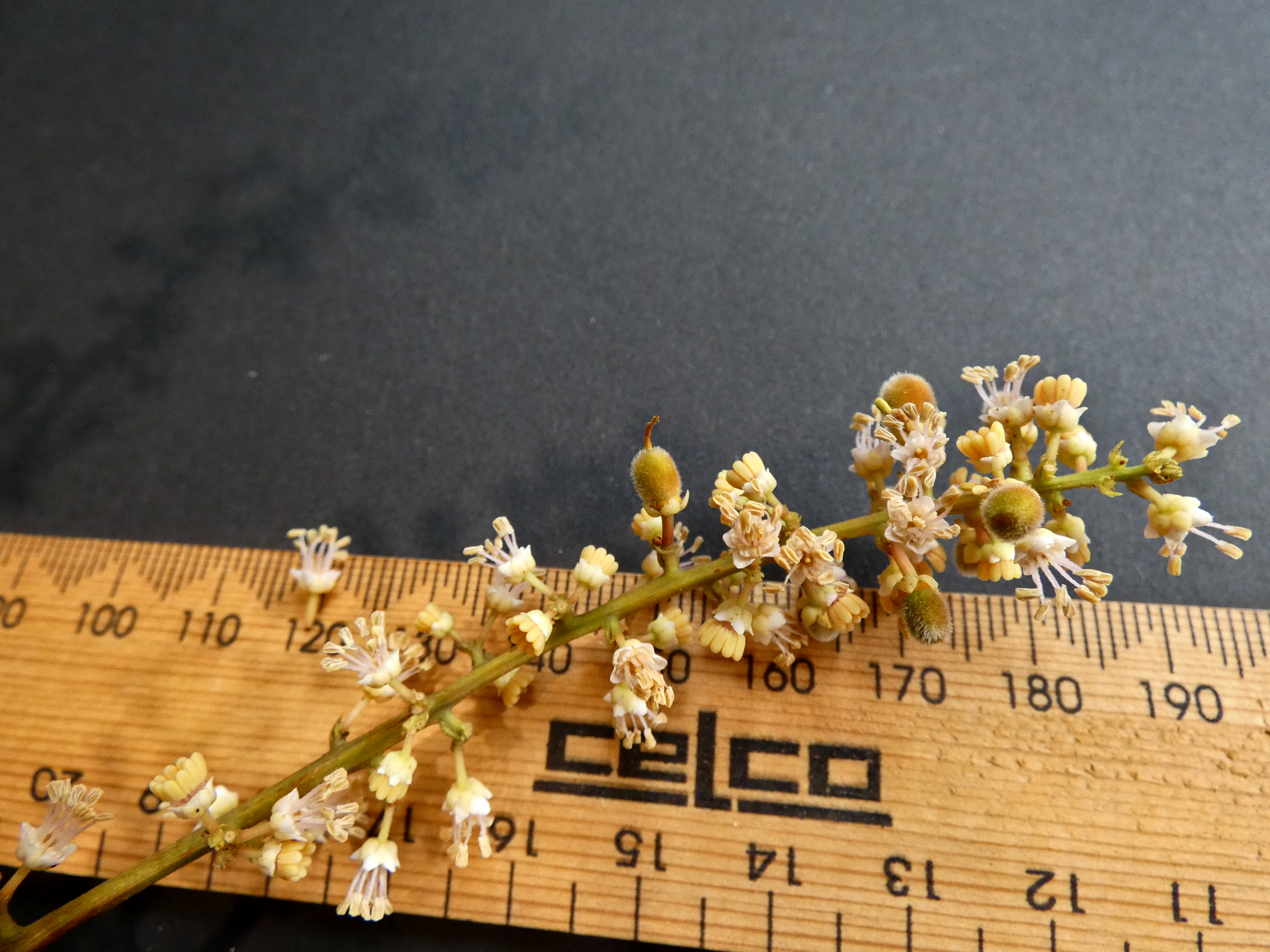
Detail of flowers and nascent fruit

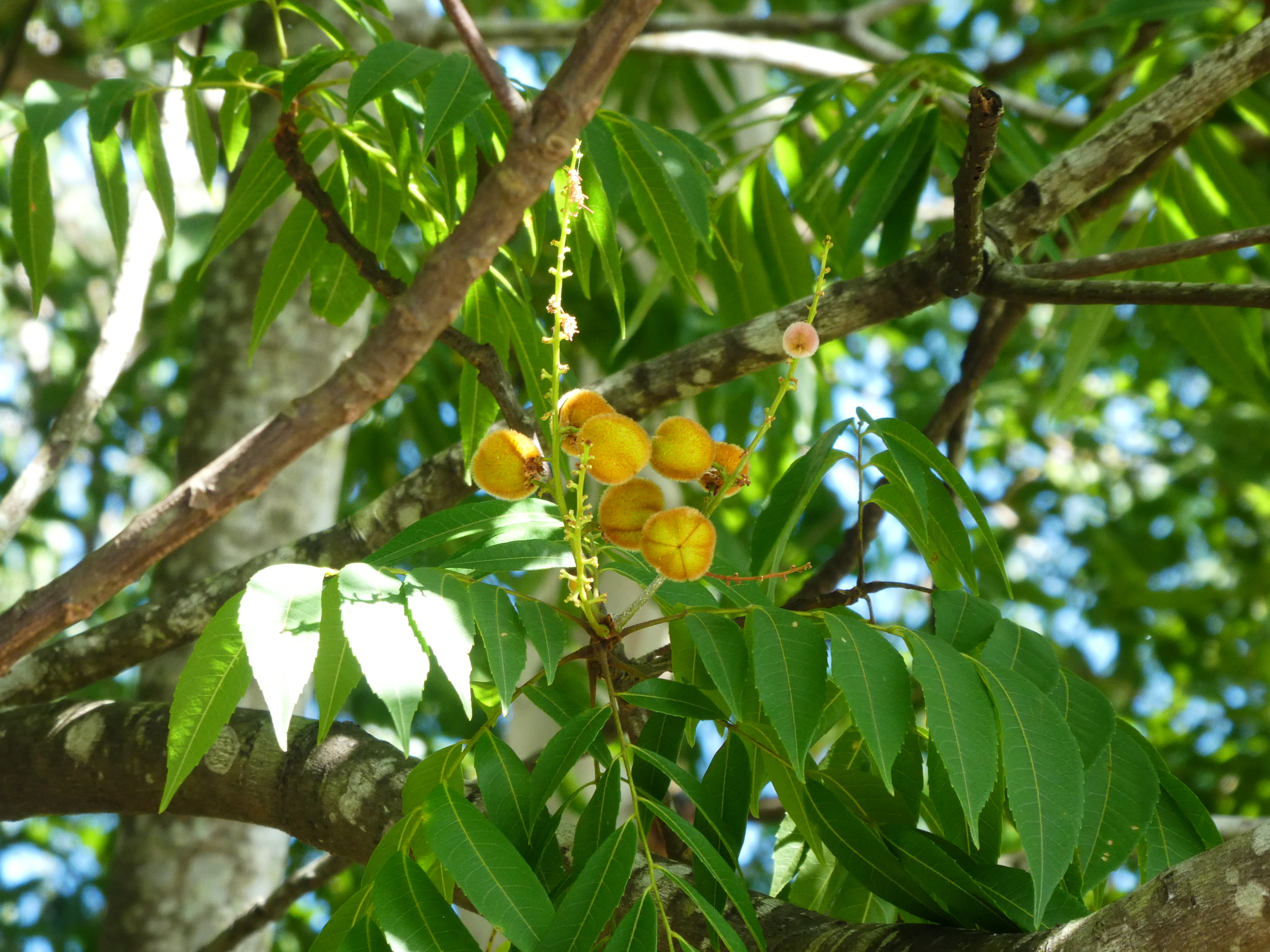
Fruit
