= Logan Hyperdome =

Hyperdome
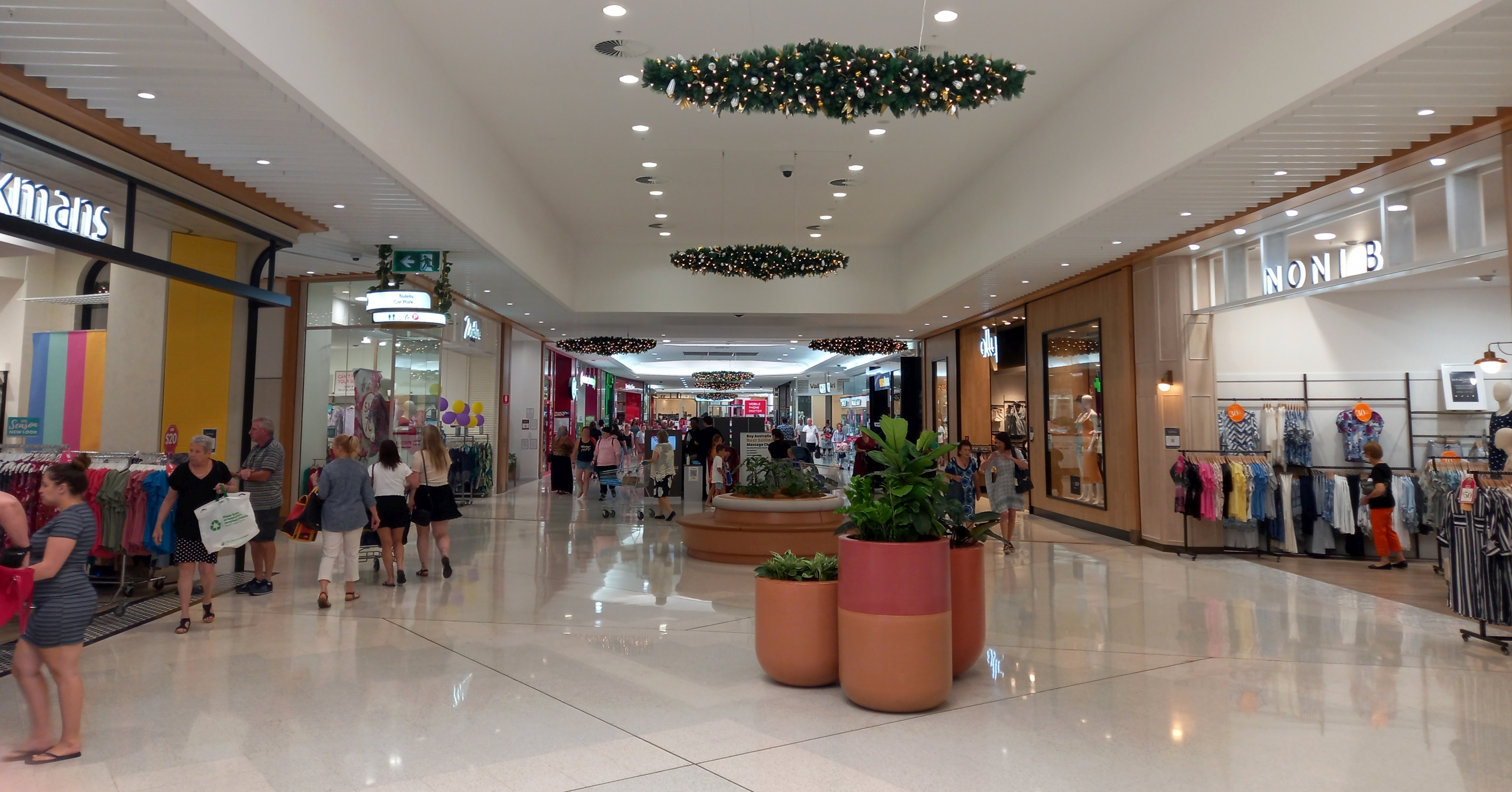
- Shopping mall, 2021
- Location: Shailer Park, Logan City, Queensland, Australia
- Coordinates: 27°39′40″S 153°10′20″E
- Opened: July 1989
- Developer: Bob Ell
- Owner: Queensland Investment Corporation
- Num. of stores: Approx 220
- Num. of anchor tenants: 7
- Floor area: 81,000 m^{2} (870,000 sq ft) (Hyperdome GLA Retail) 22,756 m^{2} (244,940 sq ft) (Home Centre GLA Retail)
- Parking: Approx 4200
- Website: hyperdomeshopping.qicgre.com

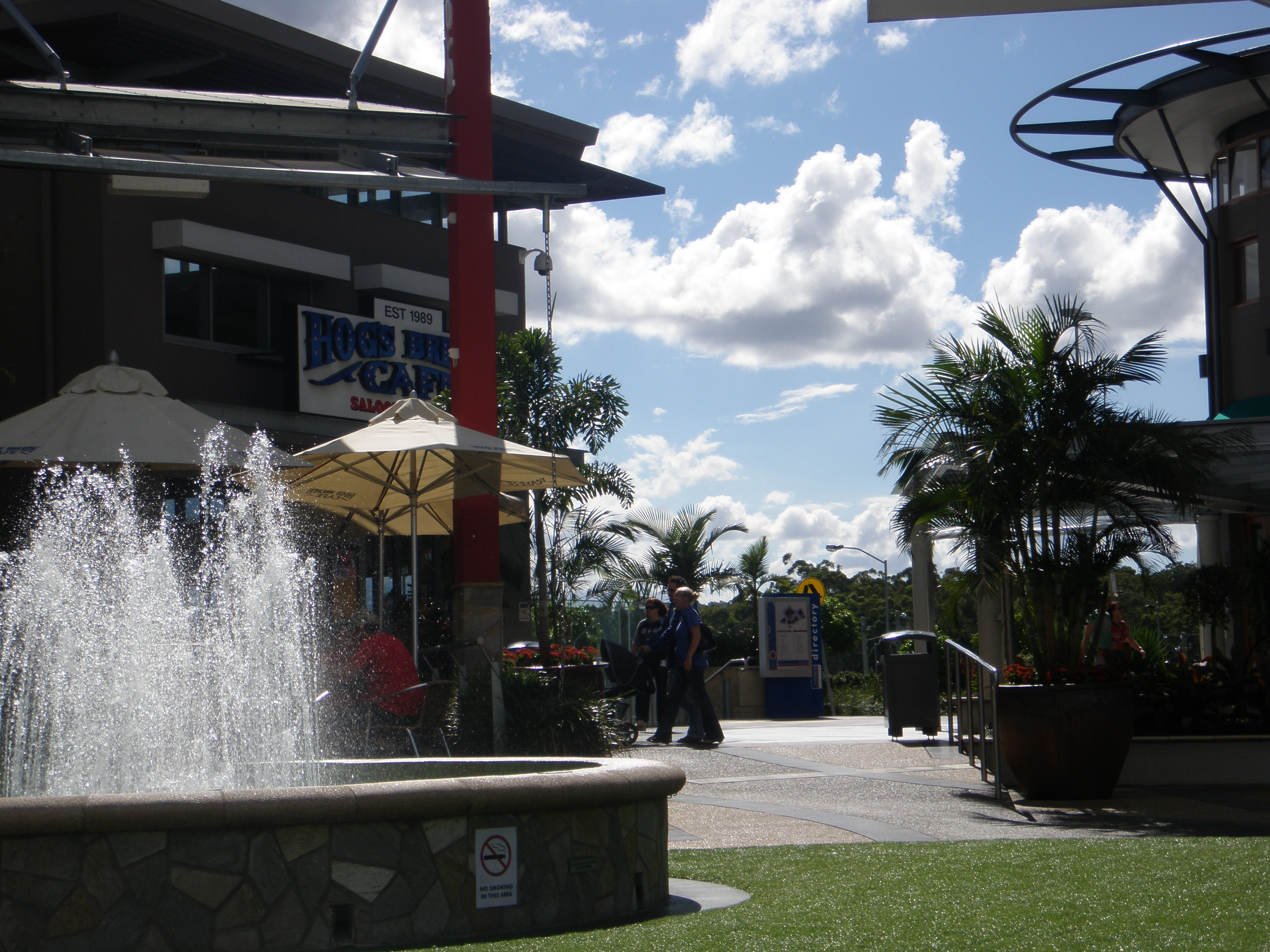
Hyperdome Piazza with Hog's Breath Cafe on the left

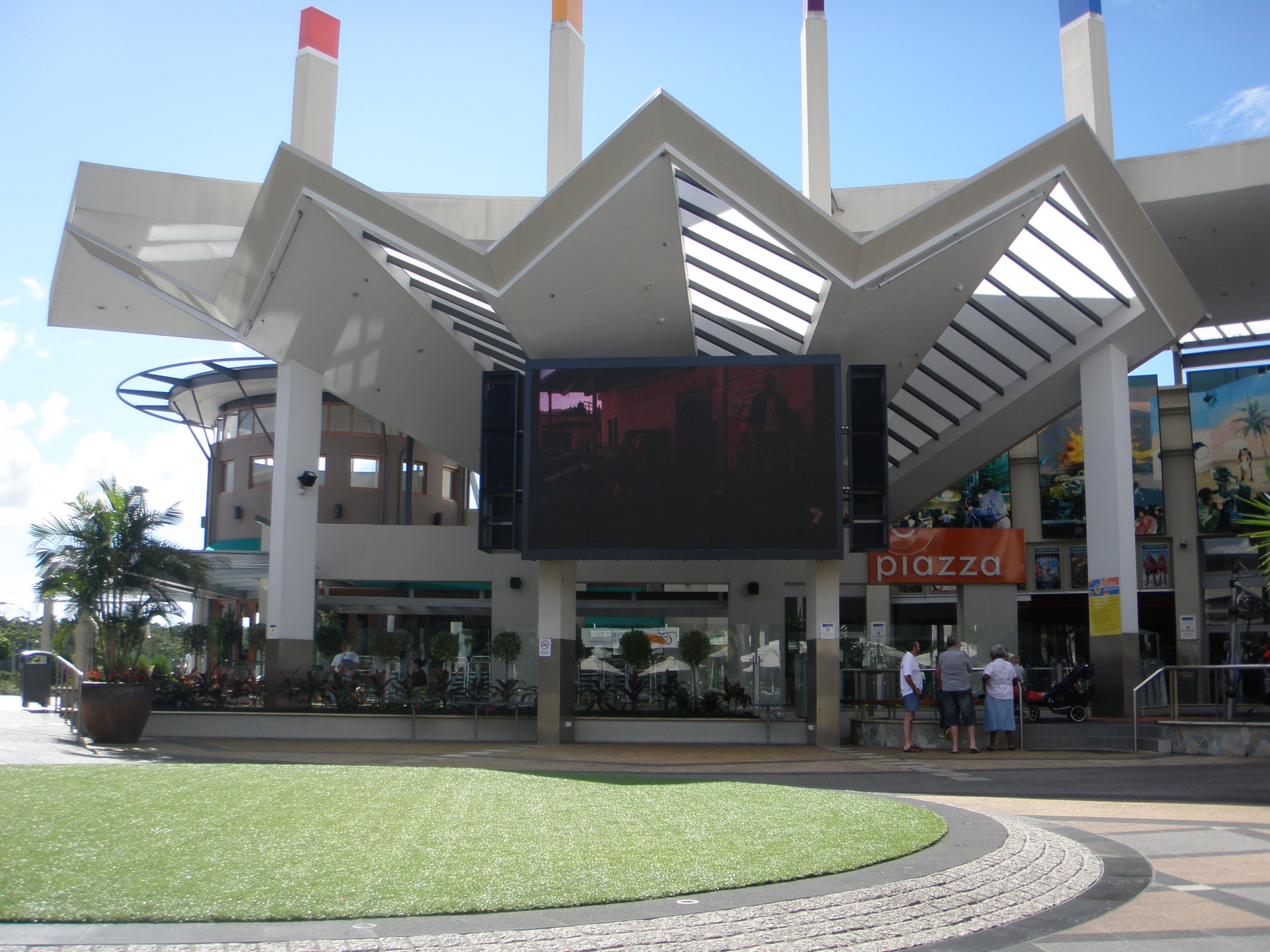
Big screen at the Hyperdome Piazza

Logan Hyperdome Shopping Centre in Shailer Park, Queensland, is the largest shopping centre in Logan City and one of the largest single storey shopping centres in Australia.

The Queensland Police Service operates a police beat shopfront in the centre. Logan City Council has a library at the far northern end of the Hyperdome and this is a separate, stand alone building. The Logan Hyperdome contains a food court with many outlets. Event Cinemas operate a cinema complex within the centre. Australia Post operates a post office in the centre.

== History ==
Built after the closure and demolition of Wild Waters water park, the Hyperdome first opened in August 1989. Work at the site began in September 1988 and it was officially opened in July 1989. The centre featured 144 retailers. In 1990 Bob Ell sold it to Dreamworld developer John Longhurst. Longhurst later sold a 50% shareholding to the Queensland Investment Corporation who took full ownership in 2013.

It received upgrades in May 1990, October 1997, December 1998, March 2005 and August 2015. The October 1997 upgrade was the largest upgrade when Bi-Lo Mega Frrresh (closed 30 June 2017) was moved from its original location where the now-defunct Crazy Clark's is located and Big W was added along with around 50 specialty stores and a 2-storey carpark. The 2005 upgrade included upgrading the Event Cinemas to 12 (previously 'Pacific 8') and installing a bowling alley (AMF Hyperbowl), another carpark and several restaurants and bars in the newly constructed piazza. The 2015 upgrade cost $17 million and revamped the southern end of the shopping centre, creating a new area called The Market Room. This area features several fresh food retailers and restaurants.

The Logan Hyperdome Library opened in 1998 with a major refurbishment in 2014.

In January 2019, Myer closed its doors due to lack of customers.

In 2020, Sizzler's Loganholme store, at the Logan Hyperdome closed. The brand had been active in Australia for 35 years, but permanently closed its nine remaining restaurants on 15 November 2020.

== Hyperdome Home Centre ==
In addition, the Hyperdome Home Centre separated from the main Hyperdome mall area.

== Transport ==
It contains the Loganholme bus station located in Zone 3 for Translink services. Adjacent to the bus station is a taxi rank.

== See also ==
- List of shopping malls in Australia
