= Shailer Park State High School =

Secondary school in Queensland, Australia

Location
- 3 Leaf Street; Shailer Park, Queensland, 4128; Australia; 27.662244°S 153.18658°E

Information
- School type: Public secondary day school
- Motto: Excellence in Learning and Life
- Religious affiliation: Non-denominational
- Established: 1980
- Authority: Department of Education (Queensland)
- Principal: Megan Herbert
- Teaching staff: 93 (teaching); 38 (non-teaching)
- Year levels: Year 7 – Year 12
- Gender: Coeducational
- Enrolment: 958 (August 2025)
- Capacity: 1,344 students
- Houses: Barnes; Bilin Bilin; Francis; Karle
- Colours: Sky Blue; Navy Blue
- Website: shailerparkshs.eq.edu.au

Shailer Park State High School is a public co-educational secondary school located in the suburb of Shailer Park (Queensland, Australia). The school is located in the Logan City local government area.

== History ==
The school derives its name from its location in the suburb of Shailer Park, named after a resident farming family, Francis and Catherine Shailer and their children, who arrived in the area in 1866, becoming a district in 1971, a sub-district of Slacks Creek in 1977, and eventually a suburb in 1991. The school was the first school to operate in Shailer Park, being established on 29 January 1980.

== Motto ==
Since 2025, the school's motto, as featured on the school crest, is "Excellence in Learning and Life". This replaced the prior motto of "Achieve with Dignity", used up until 2024.

== Infrastructure ==
The school originally consisted of six buildings. In 1983, the school received a total of $711,541.94 in building and equipment grants; $625,850.48 for a "commerce block" and $85,691.46 for "manual arts – 2 drawing," while in 2009, Shailer Park was one of 32 schools to take part in a welfare scheme.

== Administration ==
=== Staff ===
When the school opened in 1980 it had a teaching staff of 8. As of 2024, the school has a teaching staff of 93 (Full-time equivalent: 86.8) and a non-teaching staff of 38 (Full-time equivalent of 31.6).

=== Parents and Citizens Committee ===
The parents and citizens committee was established by Kel H. Barnes with the establishment of the school in 1980.

=== School Council ===
The school council was established under the Education (General Provisions) Act 2006 (Qld) on 1 August 2017.

=== Principals ===
In 1980, the school's first principal was Kel H. Barnes. As of 2025, the school's current principal is Megan Herbert. Recent principals have included:

Principals of the School
| Principal | Tenure | |
| Principal | Initial Year | Final Year |
|---|---|---|
| Megan Herbert | 2023 | Current |
| Dorothea Jensen | 2017 | 2023 |
| Troy Ascott | 2014 | 2017 |
| Richard Usher | 2009 | 2014 |

Before this some of the noted principals included John Milne.

== Students ==
=== Years ===
Until 2013, the school was teaching only year 8 to year 12. As part of a 2013 trial, some twenty Queensland secondary schools started catering for year 7 to align Queensland with the other states as part of an early implementation of the official state-wide launch of Anna Bligh's 2015 "Flying Start" program. Since 2014, Shailer Park State High School started catering for year 7 to year 12

=== Enrolment ===
When the school opened in 1980, there were 101 students initially enrolled. By 1991, there were 1,400 students enrolled. As of 2024, the school has an enrolment of 958 students, with a maximum student enrolment capacity of 1,385 students. The trend in school enrolments (August figures) has been:-

Trend in enrolment figures
| Year | Years | | | | | | Boys | Girls | Total | School Capacity | Ref |
| Year | 7 | 8 | 9 | 10 | 11 | 12 | Boys | Girls | Total | School Capacity | Ref |
|---|---|---|---|---|---|---|---|---|---|---|---|
| 2011 | - | - | - | - | - | - | 420 | 367 | 787 | - | |
| 2012 | - | - | - | - | - | - | 363 | 341 | 704 | - | |
| 2013 | - | - | - | - | - | - | 340 | 332 | 672 | - | |
| 2014 | - | - | - | - | - | - | 314 | 334 | 648 | - | |
| 2015 | - | - | - | - | - | - | 349 | 347 | 696 | - | |
| 2016 | - | - | - | - | - | - | 377 | 332 | 709 | - | |
| 2017 | - | - | - | - | - | - | 349 | 347 | 696 | - | |
| 2018 | - | - | - | - | - | - | 474 | 439 | 913 | - | |
| 2019 | - | - | - | - | - | - | 529 | 457 | 986 | - | |
| 2020 | 225 | 262 | 232 | 124 | 139 | 78 | 554 | 506 | 1,060 | 1,230 | |
| 2021 | 210 | 227 | 254 | 213 | 107 | 120 | 601 | 530 | 1,131 | 1,230 | |
| 2022 | 219 | 202 | 221 | 225 | 174 | 93 | 579 | 555 | 1,134 | 1,230 | |
| 2023 | 192 | 210 | 189 | 201 | 174 | 149 | 575 | 540 | 1,115 | 1,385 | |
| 2024 | 158 | 178 | 188 | 174 | 157 | 155 | 518 | 492 | 1,010 | 1,385 | |
| 2025 | TBA | TBA | TBA | TBA | TBA | TBA | 493 | 465 | 958 | 1,385 | |
| 2026 | TBA | TBA | TBA | TBA | TBA | TBA | TBA | TBA | TBA | TBA | |

== Cultural Diversity ==
=== Multiculturalism ===
The recent trends in multicultural composition have been:

Trend in multiculturalism
| Year | Indigenous | LBOTE | Ref |
|---|---|---|---|
| 2014 | 5% | 10% | |
| 2015 | 5% | 9% | |
| 2016 | 5% | 9% | |
| 2017 | 4% | 8% | |
| 2018 | 4% | 10% | |
| 2019 | 5% | 10% | |
| 2020 | 5% | 11% | |
| 2021 | 5% | 10% | |
| 2022 | 5% | 11% | |
| 2023 | 5% | 13% | |
| 2024 | 5% | 15% | |
| 2025 | 5% | 17% | |
| 2026 | TBA | TBA | |

== Sports ==
=== Houses ===
The school's four houses are named after historical figures from both the school's history and the history of the local area:

School houses
| House Name | Historical Figure | Colour | Ref |
|---|---|---|---|
| Barnes | Kel H. Barnes | Red | |
| Bilin Bilin | Bilin Bilin | Green | |
| Francis | Francis Shailer | Orange | |
| Karle | Val Karle | Purple | |

== Controversies ==
In June 2019, the school was placed in a lockdown and a 12-year-old student was arrested after stabbing a 13-year-old student from behind during a class change which resulted in a non life threatening injury.

== Notable alumni ==
| Alumni | Notoriety | Ref |
|---|---|---|
| Daniel Jones | Musician, songwriter, record producer and real estate agent | |
| Robbie McEwen | Former professional road cyclist | |
| Jade Pregelj | Australian rules football player | |

== See also ==
- List of schools in Greater Brisbane
