= Waterford State School =

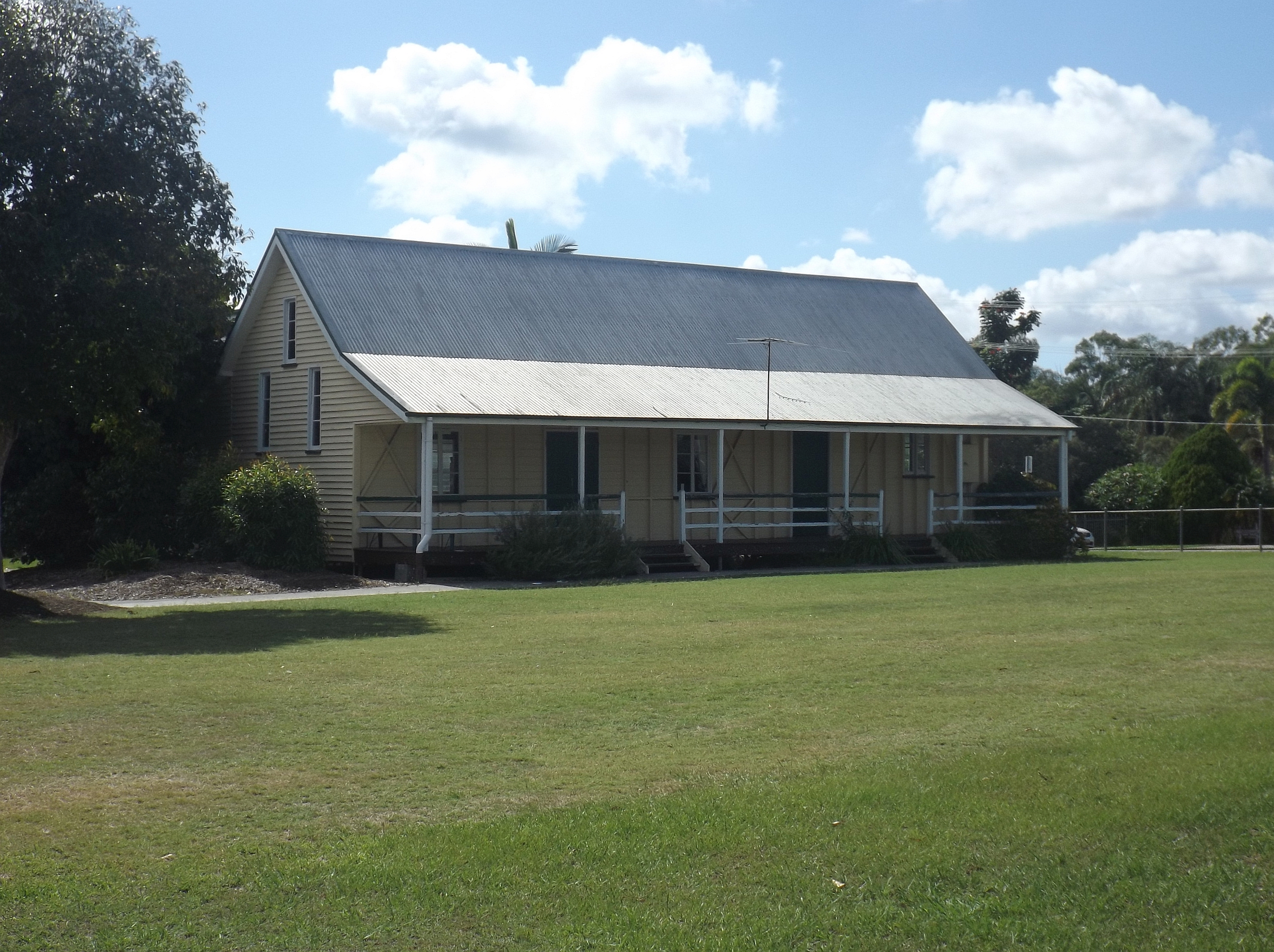
- View from Nerang Street

- Location within Queensland Location within Australia
- 27.6963°S 153.1446°E
- Location: 40 Nerang Street, cnr Jordan Street, Waterford, City of Logan, Queensland, Australia

Site notes
- Architect: Richard George Suter

Queensland Heritage Register
- Official name: Waterford State School (Block A and Play Shed)
- Type: state heritage
- Designated: 16 October 2008
- Reference no.: 602672

Waterford State School is a heritage-listed state school at 40 Nerang Street, cnr Jordan Street, Waterford, City of Logan, Queensland, Australia. Block A was designed by Richard George Suter and built in 1871. It was added to the Queensland Heritage Register on 16 October 2008.

== History ==
Waterford State School Block A is a single-storeyed timber building located at the corner of Nerang and Jordan streets, Waterford. The earliest section was erected in 1871 from local ironbark and pine and was designed for the Board of Education by Brisbane architect, Richard George Suter. It was the first national school opened on the Logan Agricultural Reserve, which was among the earliest and largest of the agricultural reserves established in Queensland in the 1860s when the government was seeking to encourage agricultural immigrants to settle in the new colony. Extensions to the building made in 1884 and in 1888–1889, when a second school room designed by the Department of Public Instruction's architect John Ferguson was added, created the present form of the building. The play shed was erected in 1898.

The Waterford district was opened to closer settlement from the early 1860s, following proclamation on 2 January 1861 of the Logan Agricultural Reserve – 20,000 acres to the north and west of the Logan River, about 17 miles (27 km) south of Brisbane. The first allotments were offered for selection in April 1862. The reserve was more than doubled in 1863, with an extension of 25,000 acres south and east of the river proclaimed on 7 August 1863. The Reserve then encompassed the districts of Loganlea, Waterford, Logan Reserve, Logan Village, Buccan, Chambers Flat, Stockleigh and parts of Maclean (now North Maclean and South Maclean) and Park Ridge. On 18 October 1864, a further 8,000 acres extension to the Logan Agricultural Reserve was proclaimed – north of the Logan River, around Loganholme.

Many of the settlers who first took up land on the Logan Agricultural Reserve in the 1860s were Irish immigrants who had come to Queensland under the auspices of the Queensland Immigration Society, established in 1861 by the Catholic Archbishop of Brisbane, James Quinn. Between 1862 and 1865 approximately 6,000 Irish were encouraged to emigrate to Queensland under this scheme. At Waterford they formed a distinctive community. In the 1870s many of these Irish settlers moved from the Logan Reserve to take up selections at Tamborine Village, Kerry and Rathdowney, as the pastoral runs along the Upper Logan and Albert rivers were opened for selection. As the Irish moved off the Reserve, German immigrants who had taken up land around Bethania (German Pocket) from 1864, moved to the Waterford and Logan Village districts. In the 1860s and early 1870s colonial government encouragement of German immigration to Queensland resulted in a large influx of German settlers into the Logan district from the mid-1860s.

The first schools in the Upper Logan and Albert rivers district were associated with the opening of the Logan Agricultural Reserve in the 1860s. A few private schools appeared briefly, but were soon absorbed into the public education system.

The Education Act of 1860 created a Board of General Education in Queensland administered by the General Inspector of Schools. Until 1875 the Board was responsible for administering and assisting existing national (state), denominational and private schools and for constructing new national schools.

Prior to 1869, the only government-assisted school on the Logan Agricultural Reserve appears to have been the Logan River Non-Vested School, established by the Irish Catholic community at Logan Reserve, north of the river on portion 44, in 1865. The lack of national schools on the Reserve reflected the failure of the early selection Acts and of the Education Act of 1860, which imposed school fees and required still-struggling farming communities to raise one-third of the cost of providing school premises and to guarantee a minimum average attendance of 30 pupils.

In 1869, to facilitate primary education in the new agricultural districts, the colonial government introduced a system of provisional schools for smaller communities that could guarantee a student population of 15 (later reduced to 12). Provisional schools were generally temporary structures on non-government land. The government supplied the teacher and school books but did not fund building construction. Many provisional schools were conducted in slab huts and barns - often an existing structure offered by a local farmer. As the community became more established and a larger school population could be guaranteed, provisional schools were upgraded to national schools (later state schools).

The Waterford State School was established as the Logan Provisional School, which opened on 29 June 1869 in a barn belonging to Charles Wilson on the east of the Logan River, south-east of the current Waterford State School. Of an initial enrolment of 22, over 75 per cent were from German families.

In late 1869 the Waterford community petitioned the Board of Education for the establishment of a permanent national school, taking advantage of the colonial government's decision to abolish school fees, which came into effect in January 1870. After some debate as to the most accessible location, a site was selected in the centre of the town of Waterford, which had been surveyed in 1866 on the eastern side of the Logan River. This remains the site of the Waterford State School. Students who lived to the north and west of the Logan River attended school via the ferry, until the first Waterford Bridge opened in 1876.

Tenders for a national school at Waterford were called in late 1870, the contract being let to Robert Hardy and John Ford of Beenleigh with a price of £140. The community would have contributed one-third of the cost of construction. The building was constructed of locally milled timber and opened in mid-1871 as the Waterford Primary School. It was the first national school constructed on the Logan Reserve. (Beenleigh National School, which opened on 7 February 1871, lay outside the Reserve.) Even so, the Waterford school was closed during parts of 1872 and 1873 due to lack of pupils and apparently to disagreements between the teacher and the local school committee. After a teacher's residence was erected in late 1873, the situation stabilized.

At this period the colonial government engaged private architects to design new school buildings within planning and design parameters set by the Board of General Education. Waterford Primary School was designed by Brisbane architect Richard George Suter, who from 1868 to 1875 was responsible for most Queensland school designs, building mostly masonry schools in urban areas and developing a design for economical, simple-to-construct timber schools in rural areas. This design formed the basis of school planning for the next 50 years. The early Suter timber schools were low-set, gabled structures, rectangular in plan with a porch and no verandahs, and utilised external studding to the walls. After 1873 Suter introduced an "improved plan" adding front and rear verandahs to provide hat rooms and additional play and classroom space. The minimum size of a school was 480 square feet (45 m^{2}) accommodating 48 pupils. Some plans show the floor slightly stepped to form a gallery. Suter's "improved plan" was used throughout the colony.

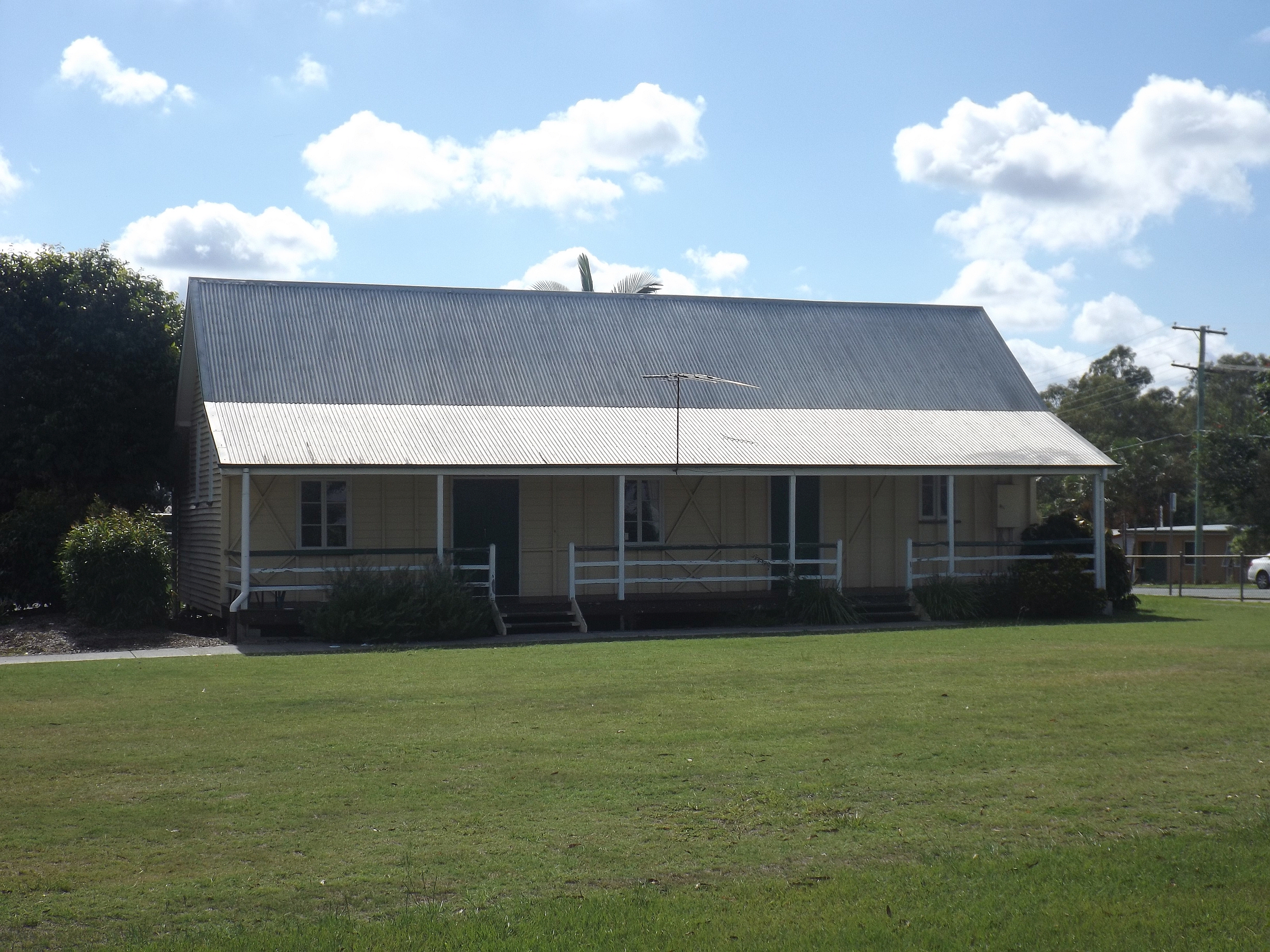
Front of building, 2016

In 1876 David Ewart, General Inspector for the Department of Public Instruction, described the Waterford school building as measuring 30 by 16 feet (9.1 by 4.9 m), with an entrance porch and no verandahs. It had exterior ironbark studs, pine tongue and groove walls, pine floor boards, and a hardwood shingled roof. The porch had narrow hardwood floorboards and a pine roof.

Play sheds were introduced to Queensland schools in the 1870s to provide covered play areas adjacent to low set schools, and about 1874 an open-sided play shed of hardward posts and wall plates and a roof of boughs, was constructed to the south-east of the Waterford Primary School. This structure is no longer extant.

The Education Act of 1875 instigated compulsory, free, secular primary education throughout the State. Under this Act the system of provisional schools was retained, but the government no longer funded non-vested schools (denominational and private schools), and the government-owned national and primary schools became known as state schools. The Act also abolished the Board of General Education, which had been responsible for the design of schools in Queensland, and created the Department of Public Instruction. The Colonial Architect, FDG Stanley, was given responsibility for school design and established new standard plans for timber schools.

In 1879 responsibility for school design passed from the Colonial Architect's office to the Department of Public Instruction, which engaged the architect Robert Ferguson until 1885, when he was replaced by his brother John. Robert Ferguson developed new designs, which remained in use until 1893, after which responsibility passed back to the Department of Public Works. Ferguson also favoured single-skin construction, but with studs exposed inside rather than outside. In their designs the Ferguson brothers incorporated roof fleches or vents at high level in the gable walls.

By the 1880s the Waterford district was more established, and the Waterford State School population was expanding. In 1884 a 10-foot (3.0 m) wide verandah was added to the back of the school building, providing additional classroom space. By 1888 enrolment had risen to around 100, and in late 1888-early 1889 the building was extended to John Ferguson's design, with the addition of another classroom measuring 20 by 16 feet (6.1 by 4.9 m) at the south-east end of the building, and construction of front and rear verandahs along the full length of the extended building. At this time the front porch was removed, to accommodate the 7-foot-8-inch (2.34 m) wide verandah. The whole of the building was roofed with corrugated iron. Drawings show that the second classroom was of single-skin construction with studding exposed externally on the verandahs and internally on the new gable end. Walls were 12 feet (3.7 m) high. There was a high level vent in the gable and the ceiling was raked with a vent. There was a three bay window of tall, central pivoting windows with a central sill and a hood on the gable end and 3 pairs of narrow, central pivoting windows in the side walls. The double doors from the front verandah were off centre. The whole of the work, plus additions to the teacher's residence, was undertaken by John Fortune of Coomera, at a cost of £320.

In 1898 a new play shed was constructed to the north-west of the school building, at a cost of about £49. It had a gravel floor, which in early 1900 was replaced with hardwood flooring (which in turn was replaced with asphalt in 1954). In 1901 the south-west end and 14 feet (4.3 m) along each side were enclosed with timber boards in 3 feet (0.91 m) sections, so that they could be removed during hot weather. In 1911 this boarding was replaced with corrugated iron sheeting.

In 1910 the north-west gabled end of the school building was clad with weatherboards, covering the exposed stud framing, to prevent water damage where the original pine lining had shrunk.

In 1939 the raised gallery with fixed seats in each classroom was removed and level flooring provided.

From the 1960s the Waterford State School experienced a substantial increase in enrolments, reflecting the expansion of semi-urban settlement in the district. The rear verandah was enclosed to provide extra classroom space c. 1967, and in 1968 a new school building (block B), with three classrooms and a storeroom, was erected behind and to the north-east of the original school, fronting Jordan Street. When this was occupied in 1969, the early school building was used as a library (accommodated on the enclosed rear verandah) and a tuckshop.

In the 1970s school facilities expanded to the north-east on the school reserve and the original building was repaired in 1976 with the replacement of guttering, flooring, verandah railing and steps. It still functions as a classroom for individual music tuition and a space for learning support. The teacher's residence is no longer extant.

== Description ==
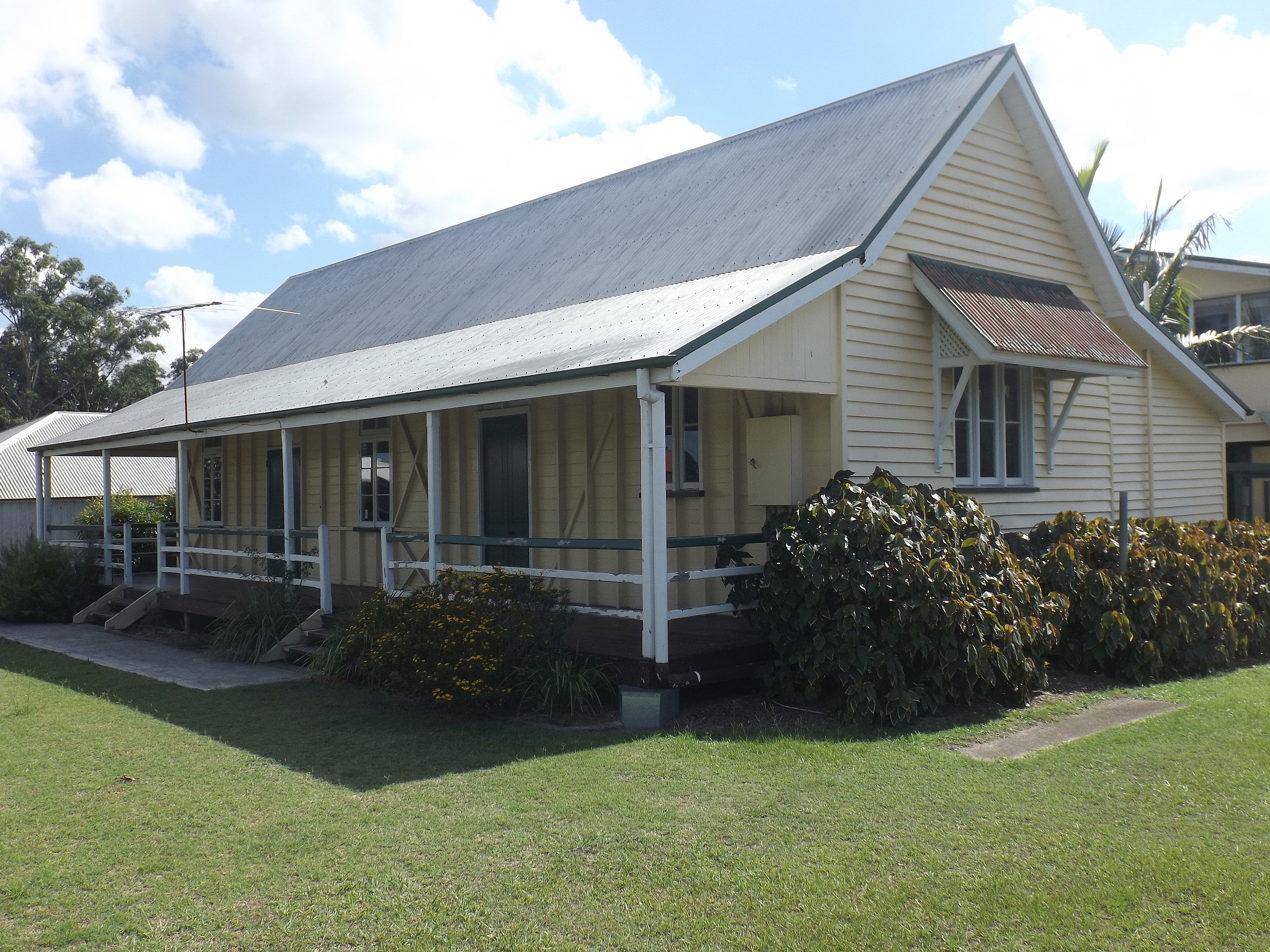
View from Jordan Street, 2016

The original Waterford State School building stands on Nerang Street, which was the major street in the township of Waterford at the time of construction of the school. The new school complex to the north and east is accessed from Jordan Street at the side.

The early school, now block A, is a low-set, gable-roofed, timber structure of two rooms with an open verandah at the front and an enclosed verandah at the rear. The north-western room is the 1871 section and the south-eastern room is the 1888–1889 extension.

The studding is exposed on the verandahs of both sections and with the stud layout and cross-bracing typically associated with Suter designs on the north-western part.

The 1871 room is 30 by 16 feet (9.1 m × 4.9 m) wide with exposed Queen post trusses and a diagonal boarded ceiling and 140-millimetre (5.5 in) horizontal beaded boards on the walls. The windows are narrow horizontal pivot windows placed with two low (although sill heights are high) and one high on the gable walls. The windows in the verandah walls are casements with fanlights over and lower sills and are possibly a modification.

The 1888–1889 section is 22 feet (6.7 m) long and has a coved timber ceiling with lattice ceiling vents and exposed timber tie beams. The gable vent, visible from outside, has been closed off. The gable wall was possibly originally unlined; the dividing wall is the original gable wall of the 1871 school and retains its high level windows. The windows in the 1888–1889 section are tall vertical pivot in banks of three and have higher sills than those in the verandah walls of the 1871 building. The pairs of doors probably date to 1888–1889 and have stop-chamfered frames with flush-beaded panels to those in the 1888–1889 section.

The play shed is a typical hipped-roof, 10-post type with an enclosure at the south-west end facing the road. The roof framing is painted.

A palm tree on the Nerang Street boundary may be early. The residence has gone but frangipani trees mark the location of the north-west boundary.

The new school buildings, dating from 1968, are located to the north- east of the original school. They are not considered to be of cultural heritage significance for the purposes of this entry in the Queensland heritage register.

== Heritage listing ==
Waterford State School (Block A and Play Shed) was listed on the Queensland Heritage Register on 16 October 2008 having satisfied the following criteria.

The place is important in demonstrating the evolution or pattern of Queensland's history.

Waterford State School (Block A and Play Shed), established in 1871 as Waterford Primary School with extensions made in 1884 (rear verandah), 1888–1889 (second school room, front verandah and extension of rear verandah) and 1898 (play shed), is important in illustrating the provision of state primary education in early Queensland agricultural settlements, following the passing of the Education Act of 1860, the abolition of school fees in 1870, and the introduction of compulsory secular education under the 1875 Education Act.

In particular, the place is significant for its association with the agricultural settlement of the Logan River district. It was the first national school established on the Logan Reserve (one of the earliest and most extensive agricultural reserves in Queensland), and remains in situ and in use as part of the present-day Waterford State School.

The place demonstrates rare, uncommon or endangered aspects of Queensland's cultural heritage.

Waterford State School (Block A) is a rare and early national school built of timber to the standard design of RG Suter and extended in 1884 and 1888–1889 during the period when the architects Robert and John Ferguson were preparing designs for the Department of Public Instruction. Both parts of the building are unusually intact.

Suter schools are significant for the development of exposed framing in Queensland which became a building form of State importance. They were an early standardised form of school design which was to be a model for managing the construction of schools in Queensland's developing rural communities. Suter's designs for timber schools were widely distributed but few survive. Only two other substantially intact Suter timber schools have been identified: Morayfield (1873) and Mutdapilly (1874). Schools from the Ferguson period also have become rare.

The place is important in demonstrating the principal characteristics of a particular class of cultural places.

Waterford State School, comprising Block A (1871 with 1884 and 1888–1889 additions) and Play Shed (1898 with later modifications), is set within a grassed school front yard. The place remains substantially intact and is important in demonstrating the principal characteristics of a small late nineteenth century rural school. The play shed at Waterford is an important adjunct to the early school building and is typical of the designs produced in the 1890s.

The two classrooms in Block A are very intact, retaining most of their early linings, joinery and hardware. As a consequence they are important in demonstrating the principal characteristics of early school design under RG Suter (1868–1873), and changes to school design under Robert and John Ferguson (1879–1893) to incorporate requests by educationalists for more windows, greater ventilation, and wide verandahs. The differing approaches to school design demonstrated in the early Waterford school building include: the different window layouts in the two rooms; the exposed roof timbers in the 1871 room compared with the ceiling lining in the 1888–1889 room with battened ceiling vent leading to a gable vent (now blocked up); the exposed framing inside the gable end of the second classroom (now enclosed with fibrous sheeting); and the differences in window pivoting arrangements. The external framing also is laid out differently in the two building parts.

The place is important because of its aesthetic significance.

The place has aesthetic significance for its scale and the visual qualities derived from the materials, the exposed framing and high ceilings, its grassed setting, and its prominent location at the front of the school grounds on one of the main roads through Waterford.
