= Munruben, Queensland =

Munruben
- Suburb
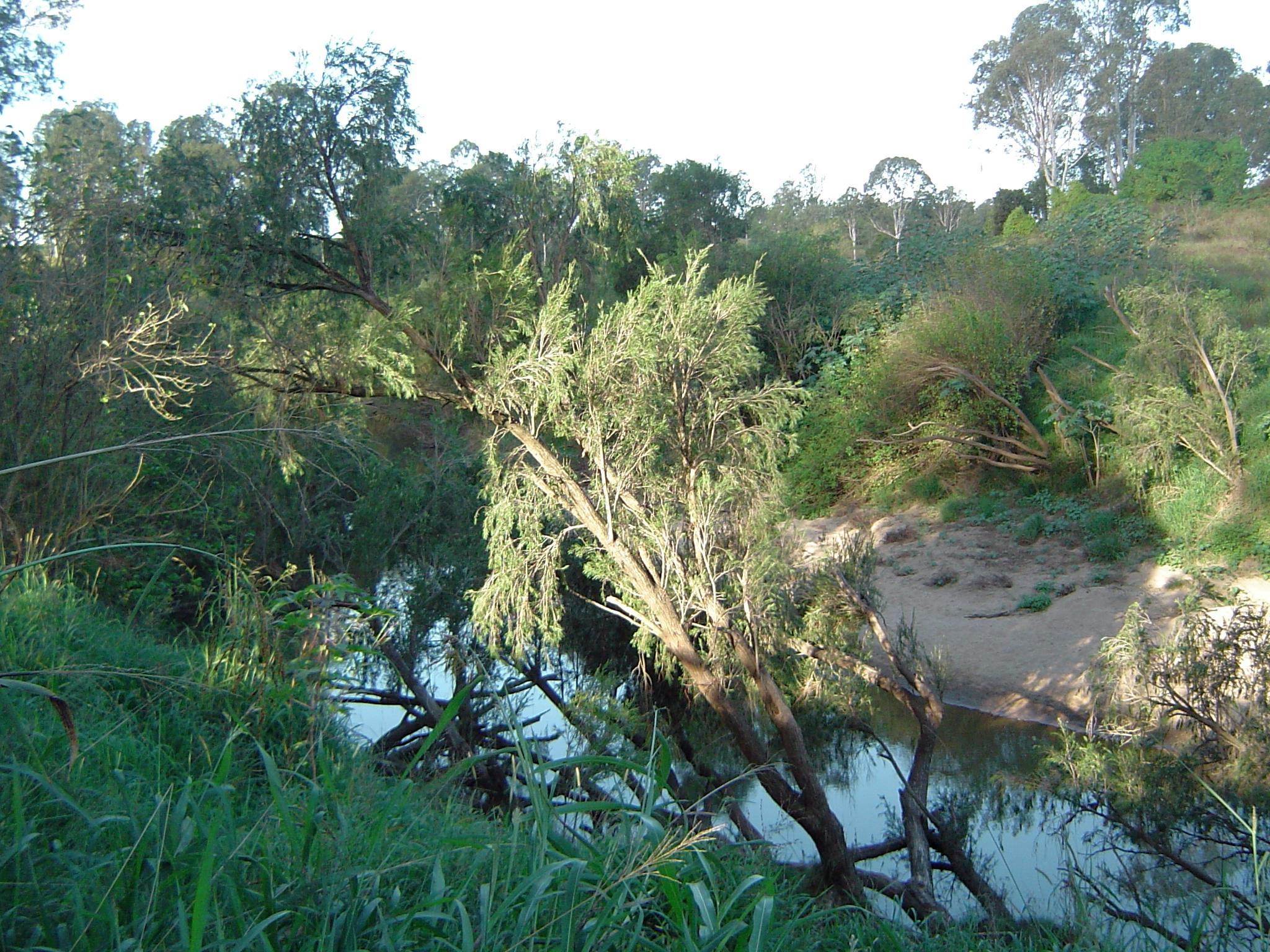
- Logan River at Gieseman Park, 2014

- Interactive map of Munruben
- Coordinates: 27.7486°S 153.0344°E
- Country: Australia
- State: Queensland
- City: Logan City
- LGA: Logan City
- Location: 18.7 km (11.6 mi) SW of Logan Central; 36.4 km (22.6 mi) S of Brisbane CBD
- Established: 1991

Government
  - State electorate: Logan
  - Federal divisions: Forde; Wright

Area
  - Total: 12.1 km^{2} (4.7 sq mi)

Population
  - Total: 2,753 (2021 census)
  - Density: 227.5/km^{2} (589.3/sq mi)
- Time zone: UTC+10:00 (AEST)
- Postcode: 4125
Suburbs around Munruben
| Park Ridge South | Park Ridge South | Chambers Flat |
| Greenbank | Munruben | Chambers Flat |
| North Maclean | Stockleigh | Chambers Flat |

Munruben is a rural locality in the City of Logan, Queensland, Australia. Once a rural community, it has been developed into a low density residential community. In the 2021 census, Munruben had a population of 2,753 people.

== Geography ==
The Mount Lindesay Highway (formerly the New England Highway) passes through the suburb. The area known as Jerry's Downfall is notorious for bogging and flooding.

== History ==
From 1840 to 1860, William Norris had a sheep station of 16,000 acres (6,500 ha) between the Oxley Creek and the Logan River which he called Mun Rubens which is believed to be derived from the Bundjalung language name for a local lagoon. The locality was officially named in 1991 (when it was in the Shire of Beaudesert).

On 6 July 1882, Norris's daughter Emma Evans and three of her children (Richard William, Ruth and Edward) drowned in the Logan River while crossing the river in a dinghy which was in poor condition. There is a memorial for the family in Gieseman Park.

Formerly in the Shire of Beaudesert, Munruben became part of Logan City following the local government amalgamations in March 2008.

== Demographics ==
In the 2011 census, Munruben recorded a population of 2,809 people, 48% female and 52% male. The median age of the Munruben population was 38 years, 1 year above the national median of 37. 77.6% of people living in Munruben were born in Australia. The other top responses for country of birth were England 5.8%, New Zealand 5%, Germany 1%, Scotland 0.7%, South Africa 0.7%. 91.1% of people spoke only English at home; the next most common languages were 0.8% German, 0.7% Hmong, 0.5% Hindi, 0.5% Serbian, 0.4% Vietnamese.

In the 2016 census, Munruben had a population of 2,871 people.

In the 2021 census, Munruben had a population of 2,753 people.

== Education ==
There are no schools in Munruben. The nearest government primary school is Park Ridge State School in Park Ridge to the north. The nearest government secondary school is Park Ridge State High School, also in Park Ridge.

== Amenities ==
Riverwood Ministries Church of Christ is at 1756 Chambers Flat Road (27.7629°S 153.0384°E).

There are a number of parks in the area:

- Chambers Flat Road Park (27.7542°S 153.0291°E)
- Giesemann Park (27.7610°S 153.0290°E)
- Jerrys Downfall Reserve (27.7360°S 153.0459°E)
- Norris Creek Park (27.7505°S 153.0225°E)

Jerry's Downfall Reserve is located in the north-east of Munruben. The name commemorates an early teamster who had an accident there. The name Jerry's Downfall has been in use since at least 1866. It has been suggested that he was a Kanaka from Robert Towns' cotton plantation at Townvale, who capsized a bullock dray of cotton while crossing Chambers Creek. It has also been suggested that the incident is connected to the Keaveny family. The Beaudesert Historical Society have erected a plaque at the reserve.
