= Park Ridge =

Park Ridge is the name of several locations:

== Australia ==
- Park Ridge, Queensland, a suburb in the City of Logan
  - Park Ridge South, Queensland, a suburb in the City of Logan

== United States ==
- Park Ridge, Illinois
- Park Ridge, New Jersey
- Park Ridge, Wisconsin
