= Stockleigh, Queensland =

Stockleigh
- Suburb
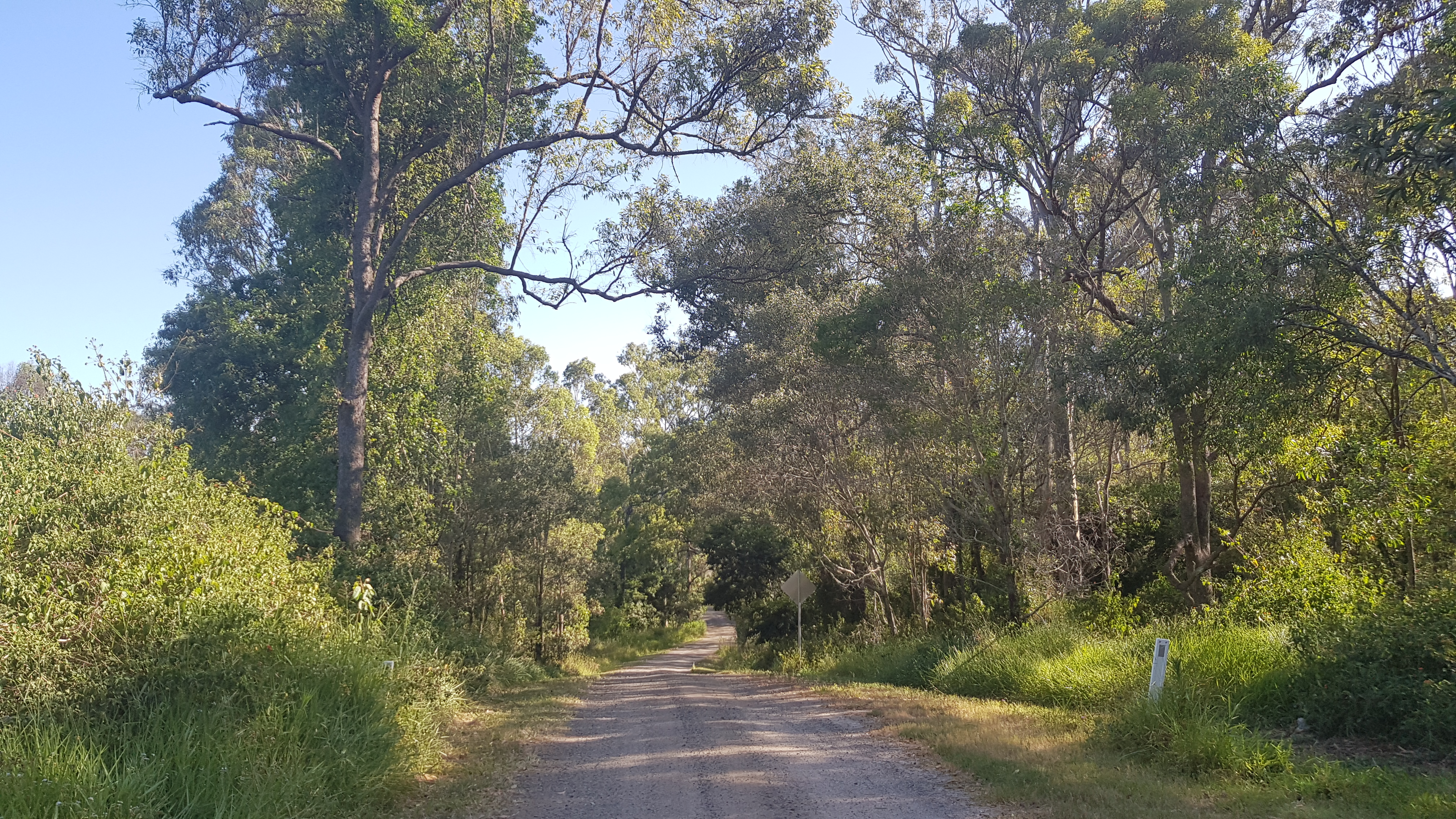
- Buckley Road, 2022

- Interactive map of Stockleigh
- Coordinates: 27.7719°S 153.0572°E
- Country: Australia
- State: Queensland
- City: Logan City
- LGA: Logan City
- Location: 9.9 km (6.2 mi) NE of Jimboomba; 21.3 km (13.2 mi) S of Logan Central; 45.6 km (28.3 mi) S of Brisbane CBD

Government
  - State electorate: Logan
  - Federal division: Forde

Area
  - Total: 16.7 km^{2} (6.4 sq mi)

Population
  - Total: 1,152 (2021 census)
  - Density: 68.98/km^{2} (178.7/sq mi)
- Time zone: UTC+10:00 (AEST)
- Postcode: 4280
Suburbs around Stockleigh
Munruben	Chambers Flat	Chambers Flat
North Maclean	Stockleigh	Logan Village
South Maclean	Jimboomba	Logan Village

Stockleigh is a rural locality in the City of Logan, Queensland, Australia. In the 2021 census, Stockleigh had a population of 1,152 people.

== Geography ==
Stockleigh is a low density semi-rural locality with larger acreage blocks. Stockleigh has an environmental park and a small housing estate in the east, near Logan Village.

== History ==
When pioneer Will Elworthy settled in the district in 1863 the area to be known as Stockleigh was named after his birthplace in Devon, England.

When farmers turned to intensive dairying, milk and cream could be transported to the Kingston dairy factory via the Maclean Bridge over the Logan River immediately west of Stockleigh.

The Stockleigh Provisional primary school opened in 1873. It became Stockleigh State School in 1909. It occupied a succession of school buildings until the school closed in 1935.

Formerly in the Shire of Beaudesert, Stockleigh became part of Logan City following the local government amalgamations in March 2008.

== Demographics ==
In the 2011 census, Stockleigh recorded a population of 695 people, 48.8% female and 51.2% male. The median age of the Stockleigh population was 40 years, 3 years above the national median of 37. 77% of people living in Stockleigh were born in Australia. The other top responses for country of birth were England 5.5%, New Zealand 4.7%, Germany 1.9%, Ireland 0.9%, China 0.4%. 89.8% of people spoke only English at home; the next most common languages were 2.3% German, 1% Hmong, 0.6% Urdu, 0.6% Cantonese, 0.4% Dutch.

In the 2016 census, Stockleigh had a population of 765 people.

In the 2021 census, Stockleigh had a population of 1,152 people.

== Education ==
There are no schools in Stockleigh. The nearest government primary schools are Logan Village State School in neighbouring Logan Village to the east, Jimboomba State School in neighbouring Jimboomba to the south, and Yarrabilba State School in Yarrabilba to the south-east. The nearest government secondary schools are Yarrabilba State Secondary College in Yarrabilba to the south-east, Marsden State High School in Waterford West to the north-east, and Flagstone State Community College in Flagstone to the south-west.
