= Chambers Flat, Queensland =

Chambers Flat
- Suburb
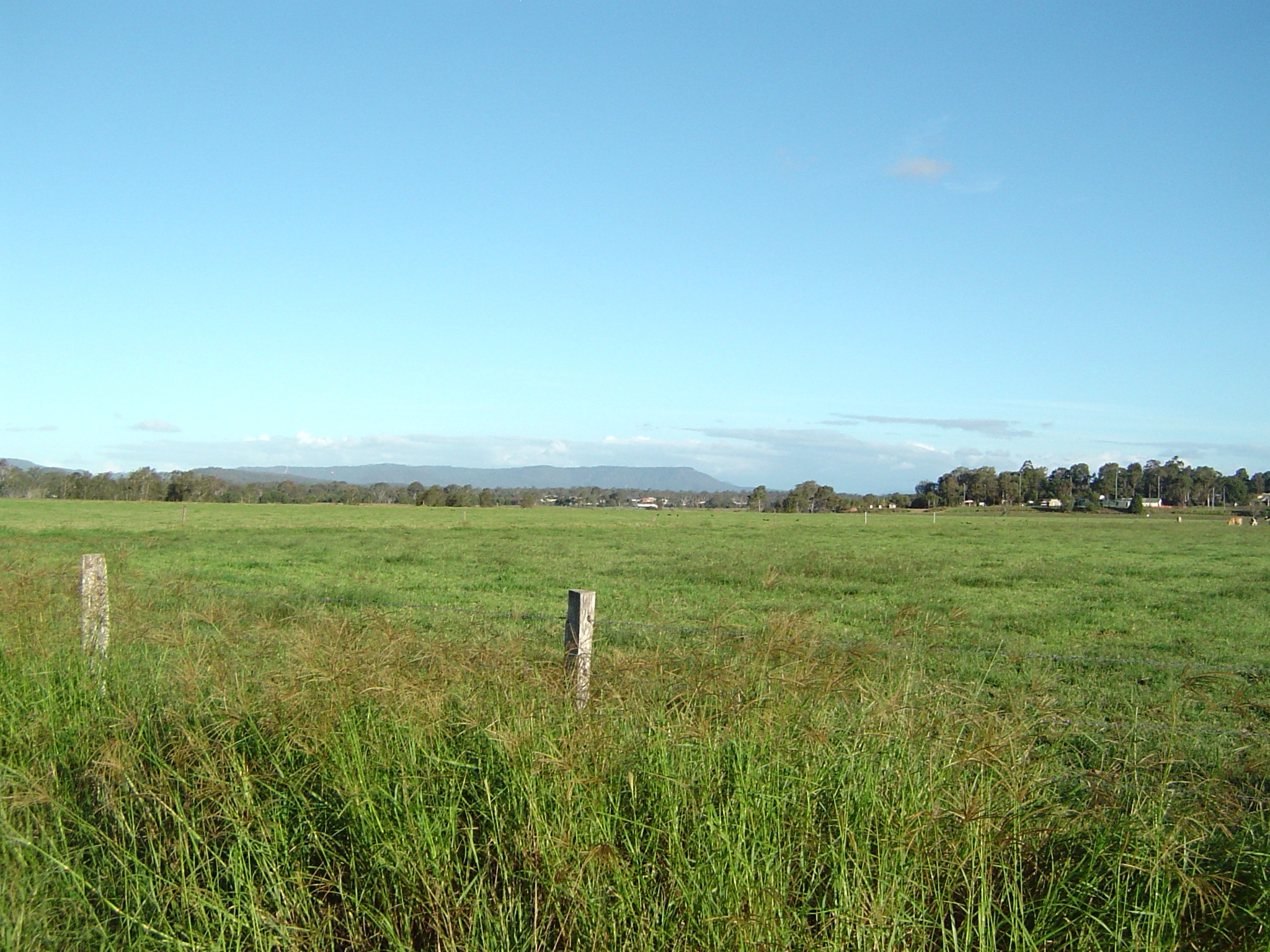
- Fields at Chambers Flat, 2014

- Interactive map of Chambers Flat
- Coordinates: 27.7466°S 153.0794°E
- Country: Australia
- State: Queensland
- City: Logan City
- LGA: Logan City
- Location: 16.8 km (10.4 mi) SSW of Logan Central; 39.2 km (24.4 mi) S of Brisbane CBD

Government
  - State electorate: Logan
  - Federal division: Forde

Area
  - Total: 22.0 km^{2} (8.5 sq mi)

Population
  - Total: 2,718 (2021 census)
  - Density: 123.55/km^{2} (320.0/sq mi)
- Time zone: UTC+10:00 (AEST)
- Postcode: 4133
Suburbs around Chambers Flat
Park Ridge; Park Ridge South	Park Ridge	Logan Reserve
Munruben	Chambers Flat	Buccan
Stockleigh	Stockleigh	Logan Village

Chambers Flat is a rural locality in the City of Logan, Queensland, Australia. In the 2021 census, Chambers Flat had a population of 2,718 people.

== Geography ==
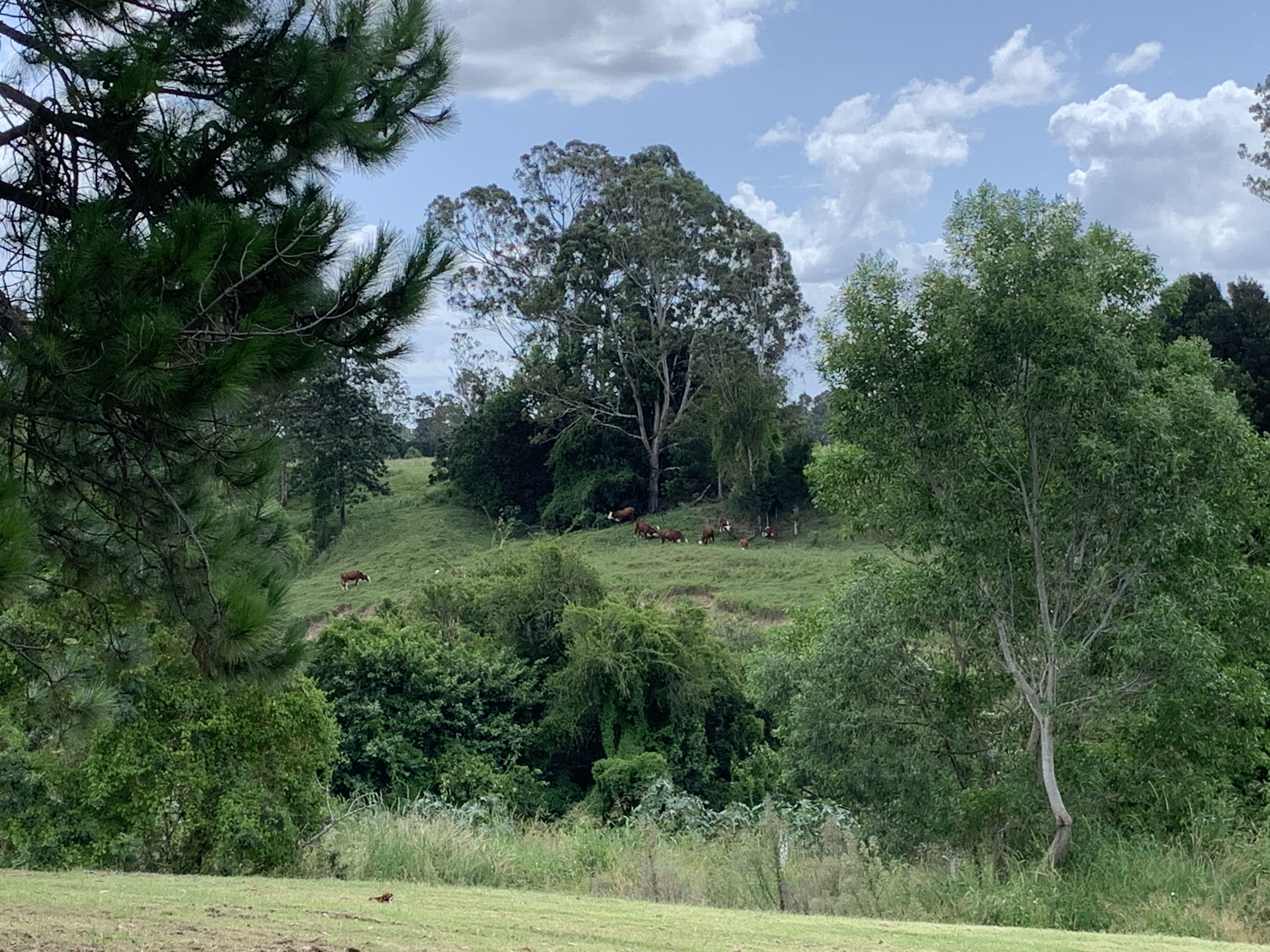
Looking across the Logan River towards Chambers Flats where cattle are grazing, 2021

The locality is bounded to the east and south by the Logan River.

== History ==
Pastoral runs were established in the district from the early 1840s. John Chambers took up land in the area in 1848, and the district is presumably named after him.

Chambers Flat Provisional School opened on 27 October 1890 under head teacher Miss Mary Curran. It became Chambers Flat State School in 1909. It closed on 3 August 1921. The school was on a 10-acre (4.0 ha) site at 33-51 Holloway Road (27.7483°S 153.0879°E).

Formerly in the Shire of Beaudesert, Chambers Flat became part of Logan City following the local government amalgamations in March 2008.

King's Christian College opened its third campus in Chambers Flat in 2020, although the school refers to it as the Logan Village campus. It opened its first campus in Reedy Creek in 1980. It opened its second campus at Pimpama in 2015.

== Demographics ==
In the 2011 census, Chambers Flat had a population of 2,464 people, with 50.2% of the population female and 49.8% male. The median age of the Chambers Flat population recorded 42, 5 years above the Australian average of 37. 75.3% of people living in Chambers Flat were born in Australia. The other top responses for country of birth were England 6%, New Zealand 4.2%, Taiwan 1.1%, Laos 1.1%, Vietnam 1%. 86.8% of people spoke only English at home; the next most common languages were 2.3% Hmong, 1.3% Vietnamese, 1.2% Mandarin, 1.1% Mon-Khmer, nec, and 0.7% Khmer.

In the 2016 census, Chambers Flat had a population of 2,331 people, with 48.8% of the population being female and 51.2% male. The median age of the Chambers Flat population recorded 44, 6 years above the Australian average of 38. 73.6% of people living in Chambers Flat were born in Australia. The other top responses for country of birth were England 5.4%, New Zealand 4.0%, Laos 1.0%, Netherlands 1.0% and Taiwan 0.9%. 82.5% of people only spoke English at home; the next most common languages included 2.5% Hmong, 1.4% Vietnamese, 1.1% Mandarin, 0.7% Khmer and 0.7% Spanish.

In the 2021 census, Chambers Flat had a population of 2,718 people, with 50.0% of the population being female and 50.0% male. The median age of the Chambers Flat population recorded 47 years, which is 9 years above the Australian average of 38. 70.6% of people living in Chambers Flat were born in Australia. The other top responses for country of birth were England 5.6%, New Zealand 4.6%, Laos 1.4%, Vietnam 1.2% and Cambodia 1.0%. 78.9% of people only spoke English at home; the next most common languages included 3.6% Hmong, 1.7% Vietnamese, 1.5% Khmer, 1.3% Arabic and 0.7% Samoan.

== Education ==
King's Christian College (Logan Village campus) is a primary (Prep-6) campus at 38-112 Anzac Avenue (27.7690°S 153.0987°E) of the independent King's Christian College school. In 2023, it had an enrolment of 418 students. It will progressively offer more years of schools with full Prep-to-12 schooling available by 2029.

There are no government schools in Chambers Flat. The nearest government primary schools are Logan Reserve State School in neighbouring Logan Reserve to the north-east, Logan Village State School in neighbouring Logan Village to the south-east, and Park Ridge State School in Park Ridge to the north-west.

The nearest government secondary schools are Marsden State High School in Waterford West to the north-east, Yarrabilba State Secondary College in Yarrabilba to the south-east, and Park Ridge State High School in Park Ridge to the north-west.

== Amenities ==
There are a number of parks in the area, including

- Chambers Creek Park (27.7452°S 153.1034°E)
- Chambers Flat Logan Reser (27.7577°S 153.0930°E)
- Chambers Flat Road Park (27.7413°S 153.0661°E)
- Chambers Road Flat Park (27.7541°S 153.0871°E)
- Kings Way Park (27.7449°S 153.0520°E)
- Wendt Park (27.7605°S 153.0681°E)

== Facilities ==
Chambers Flat Cemetery is at 2-24 Sungold Road, but is accessed from Chambers Flat Road (27.7349°S 153.0870°E). It is operated by the Logan City Council and offers monumental burials, lawn burials, and a garden for the scattering of ashes.
