= Murder of Tiahleigh Palmer =

Australian murder case

- Palmer's friends and family carry her coffin at her funeral. Her killer, Rick Thorburn, is the second pallbearer from the left.
- Date: 30 October – 6 November 2015
- Location: Logan, Queensland, Australia

Tiahleigh Palmer
- Palmer in her school uniform
- Born: Tiahleigh Alyssa Rose Palmer; 13 April 2003
- Died: 29 October 2015 (aged 12); Chambers Flat, Queensland
- Cause of death: Undetermined, likely asphyxiation
- Body discovered: Pimpama River bank, near Gold Coast, Queensland (5 November 2015)

Tiahleigh Alyssa Rose Palmer (sometimes known as Tia or Tiah) was a 12-year-old Australian girl who lived in Logan City, Queensland. She was murdered on 30 October 2015. Her remains were found six days later and her foster father, Rick Thorburn, was charged with her murder on 20 September 2016. Thorburn pleaded guilty to the murder before the Supreme Court of Queensland on 25 May 2018.

== Disappearance and death ==
Palmer's foster father said he drove her to Marsden State High School on 30 October 2015. She did not attend any classes and was not seen for the rest of the day. On 5 November, police released photos and appealed to the public for information on her whereabouts in a press conference. Later that day, the remains of a female aged 12–18 were found by a fisherman on the bank of the Pimpama River and, on 6 November, they were officially identified as Palmer's. Police then began a search for her backpack and school uniform. On 7 November, a vigil was held in Logan and, on 14 November, her funeral was held and attended by more than 600 people.

On 4 December 2015, a shoe believed to be Palmer's was found near where her body was discovered. Police conducted many interviews, searched the area around the Pimpama River and forensically examined a number of houses and vehicles. The investigation failed to find her missing backpack and school uniform.

In June 2021, a coronial inquest into the specific cause of Palmer's death was held, at which Thorburn stated that he "thinks" he "must have accidentally suffocated her". Coroner Jane Bentley rejected his claim of it being accidental, as she found him to be "completely without remorse", though she agreed with Thorburn on the likely cause of death, stating "I find that Richard Thorburn deliberately killed Tiahleigh – he did so at the residence of the Thorburn family between 7:30pm and 9:30pm on October 29, 2015" and that "While the exact cause of her death cannot be conclusively determined, I find that it is most likely that she was choked or asphyxiated."

== Criminal proceedings ==
Palmer's foster father, Rick Thorburn, was a person of interest to police from the earliest days of the investigation. The Thorburns fostered no more children after Palmer's disappearance, but continued to run a daycare service from their home until April 2016 when the state's education and child safety departments were advised by police that Rick Thorburn was facing nine serious charges unrelated to Palmer, and the family's daycare approval was revoked and their foster care approval was suspended.

In September 2016, a car formerly owned by Thorburn was seized by police for forensic examination and, on 20 September 2016, Palmer's foster parents and their two sons were taken into police custody for questioning. Rick Thorburn was charged with Palmer's murder and with interfering with a corpse. He collapsed shortly after his arrest and was subsequently placed in an induced coma for several days, missing a scheduled court appearance the next day. Police suspect he took pills just before or after his arrest, in a suicide attempt.

Palmer's 19-year-old foster brother, Trent Thorburn, was charged with two counts of perjury and one count each of attempting to pervert the course of justice and incest, and was denied bail. Her foster mother, Julene, and older foster brother, Joshua, were both charged with perjury and attempting to pervert the course of justice and released on bail.

Palmer's grandmother has told reporters that, months before she died, Palmer had declined an option to move in with her mother because she had a crush on Trent, and because she loved the horses on the Thorburn property. In a court hearing on 21 September 2016 prosecutors said that, two days before her death, Trent confessed to a cousin that he had had sex with Palmer on the previous Monday, and that she had told his mother about it. The court also heard that, shortly before her death, Palmer had told a friend that Trent would have sex with her when his parents were out, and she had told her foster mother about it.

On 23 September 2016, investigators began excavating the Thorburns' rural property in a search for evidence. Rick Thorburn said nothing to investigators, but Julene and Joshua both made statements to police. On 10 October, Julene's and Joshua's lawyer told a court they would plead guilty to all charges and had agreed to be witnesses for the prosecution.

In July 2017, Joshua Thorburn was sentenced to three months in jail for lying to police and hiding information about Palmer's death. Trent Thorburn was sentenced to four years in jail for incest, perjury and attempting to pervert the course of justice in September 2017 and released on 19 January 2018 after spending 16 months in custody. In November 2017, Julene Thorburn was sentenced to 18 months in jail for perjury and attempting to pervert the course of justice.

In March 2018, it was reported that Rick Thorburn intended to plead guilty to Palmer's murder, and he did so formally before the Supreme Court on 25 May 2018. He was then sentenced to life in prison with a non-parole period of 20 years.

On 12 April 2025, Queensland Police reported that Rick Thorburn was found dead at Woodford Correctional Facility on 11 April. His death is being scrutinised by the Correctional Services Investigation Unit.

== See also ==
- List of solved missing person cases (2010s)
