= Crestmead, Queensland =

Crestmead
- Suburb
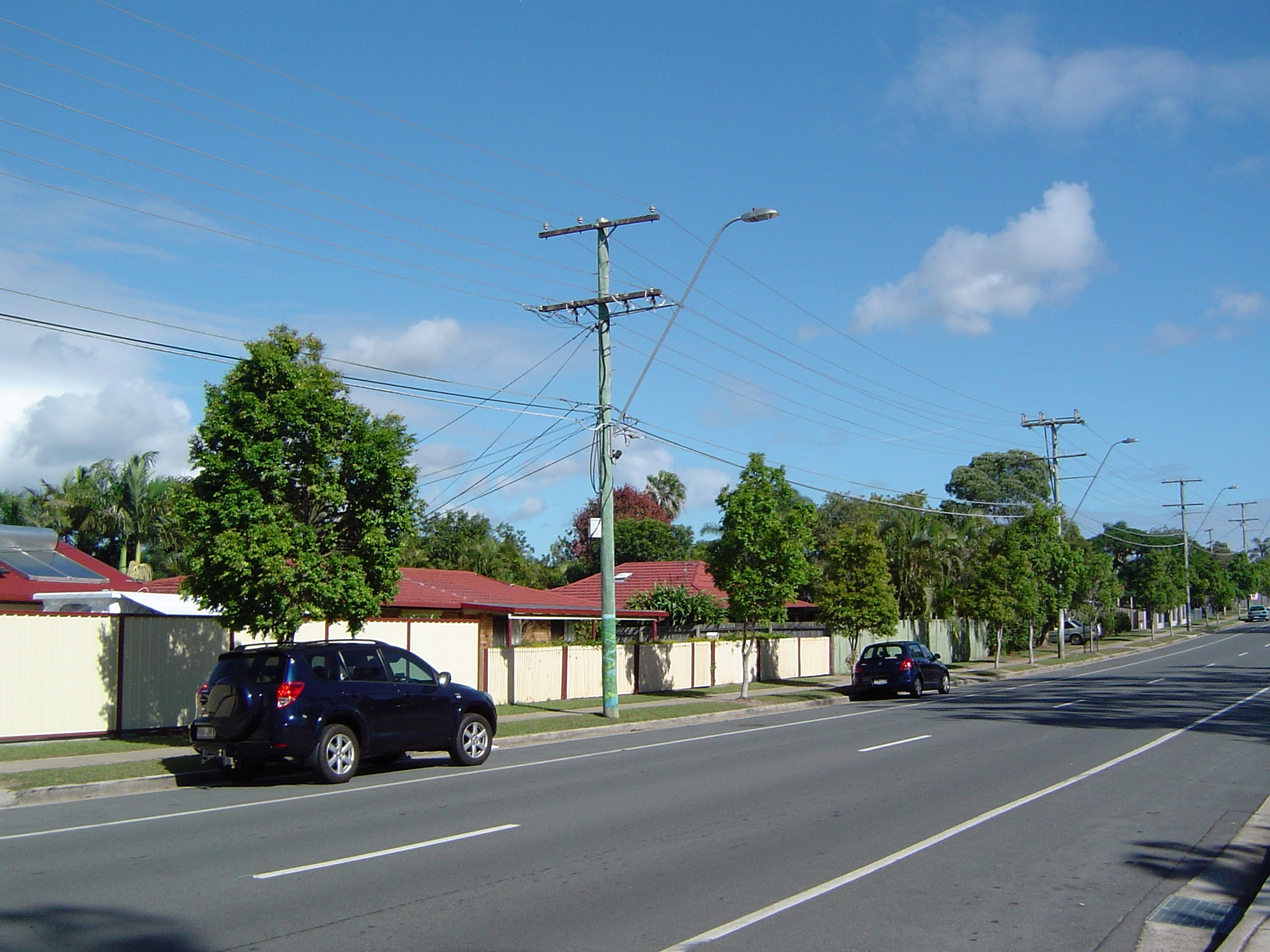
- Augusta Street, 2014

- Interactive map of Crestmead
- Coordinates: 27.6847°S 153.0861°E
- Country: Australia
- State: Queensland
- City: Logan City
- LGA: Logan City
- Location: 6.3 km (3.9 mi) SSW of Logan Central; 30.4 km (18.9 mi) SSE of Brisbane CBD
- Established: 1991

Government
  - State electorate: Woodridge
  - Federal division: Rankin

Area
  - Total: 6.8 km^{2} (2.6 sq mi)

Population
  - Total: 12,271 (2021 census)
  - Density: 1,805/km^{2} (4,670/sq mi)
- Time zone: UTC+10:00 (AEST)
- Postcode: 4132
Suburbs around Crestmead
| Browns Plains | Berrinba | Marsden |
| Heritage Park | Crestmead | Waterford West |
| Park Ridge | Park Ridge | Logan Reserve |

Crestmead is a suburb in the City of Logan, Queensland, Australia. In the 2021 census, Crestmead had a population of 12,271 people.

== History ==
In 1885, a number of Swedish immigrants from the ship Chyebassa established farms in the area. Early crops included oats, maize, potatoes and turnips. Horses and cattle were grazed and timber was cut. The Swedish settlement included O.Trulson, M.Trulson, M.Stjernqvist, M.Swensen, P.Swensen, N.Stjernqvist and P.Abrahamsen. Other early settlers were John and George Hubner who took up farms in 1893. Although the district acquired the unofficial name of Hubner from the Hubner family, when the (then) local government Shire of Beaudesert tried to formalise it in 1987, it was instead decided to name the area Crestmead after a local housing estate.

The Crestmead Industrial Estate was opened in May 1983 by Queensland Minister for Commerce, Bill Gunn.

Crestmead State School opened on 23 January 1984. It was recognised in 2017 with new status as an Independent Public School (IPS). In 2019 Crestmead State School celebrated its 35th (Coral) Jubilee in September, which attracted a large crowd of past students, staff, supporters and dignitaries. The event was notable for the tribute of naming the school hall in honour of the foundation principal, Gavin Bird. A history of the school and local area was published to commemorate the event, edited by long-term teacher Jean Murdoch, entitled "We are Crestmead State School".

St Francis' College opened on 8 February 1988.

On 24 December 2012, 80 workers at the Dairy Farmers factory in the Crestmead Industrial Estate staged a protest at the factory to protest pay rates; the protest included blocking access to milk tankers. A very large number of police attended and protestors clashed with police.

== Demographics ==
In the 2016 census, Crestmead had a population of 12,153 people. Crestmead's population was 50.5% female and 49.5% male. The median age of the Crestmead population was 28 years, 10 years below the national median of 38, with 64.2% of people living in Crestmead being born in Australia. The other top responses for country of birth were New Zealand 10.9%, England 2.1%, Samoa 2.1%, Philippines 1.2%, Cambodia 0.7%. 73.9% of people spoke only English at home; the next most common languages were 4.3% Samoan, 1.2% Khmer, 1.0% Hmong, 0.9% Arabic, 0.7% Hindi.

In the 2021 census, Crestmead had a population of 12,271 people.

== Economy ==
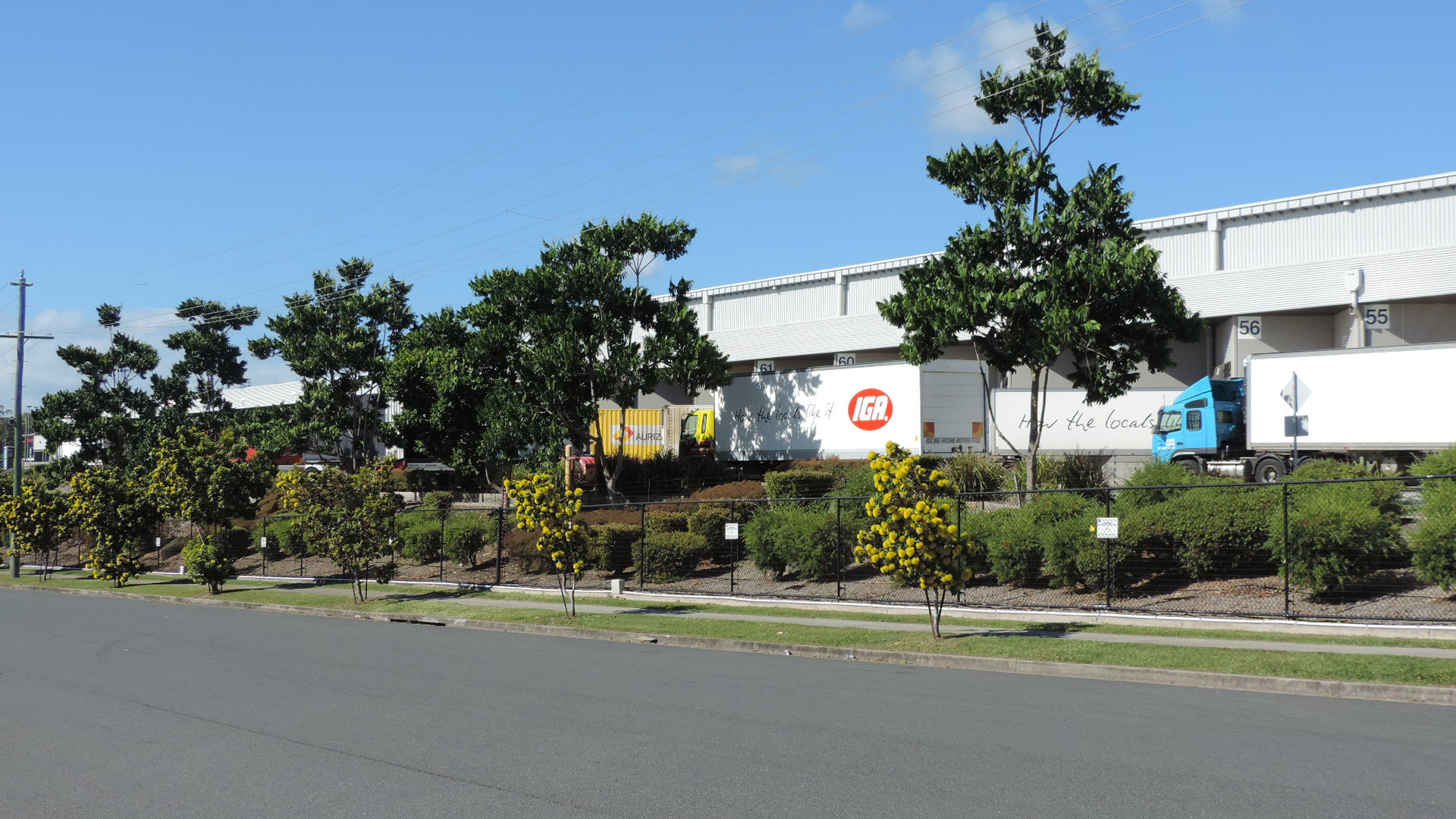
Independent Grocers of Australia (IGA) distribution centre, Crestmead Industrial Estate, 2014

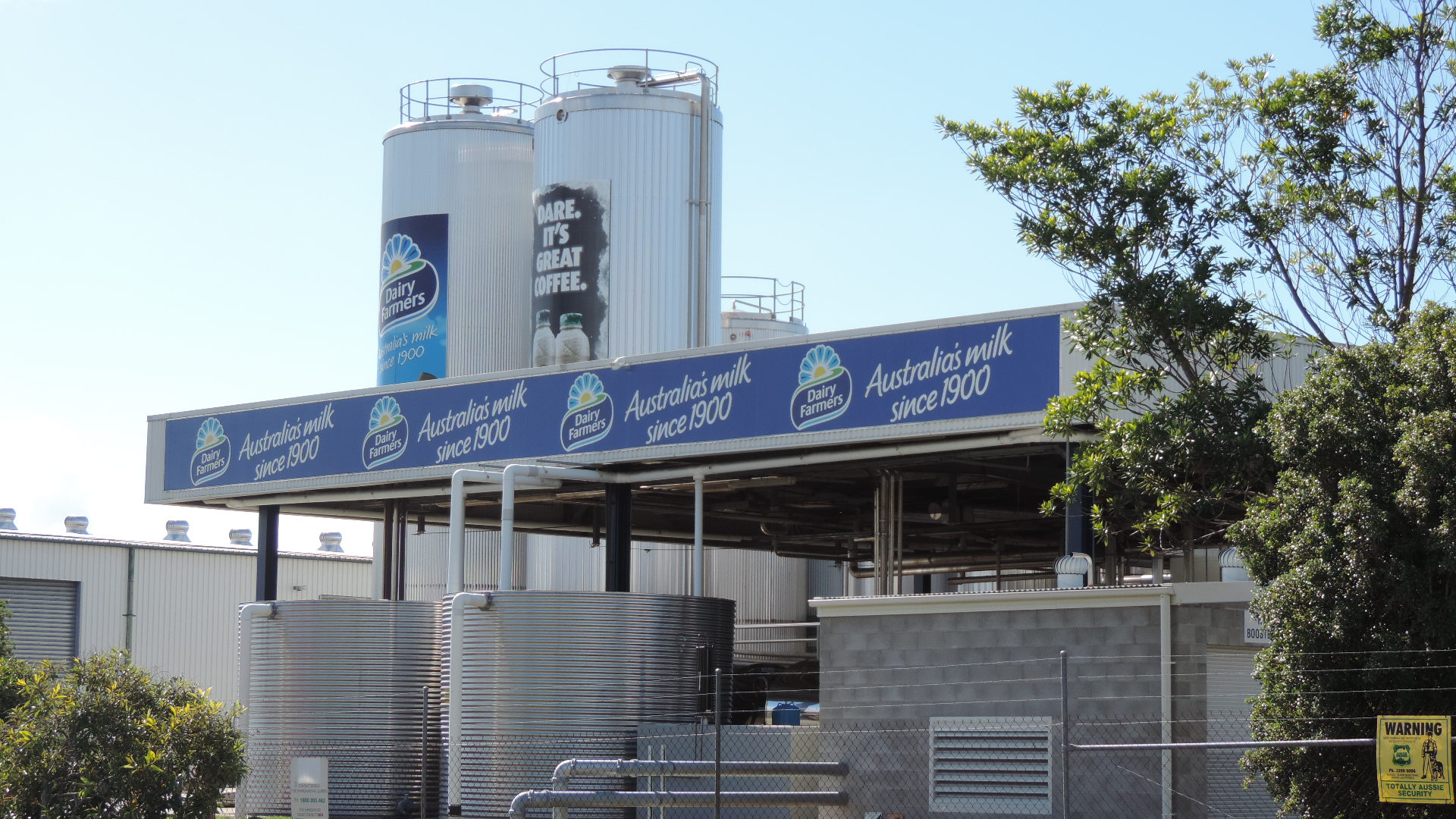
Dairy Farmers milk factory, Crestmead Industrial Estate, 2014

The Crestmead Industrial Estate is located on the western side of the suburb (27.6820°S 153.0747°E). It has lot sizes ranging from 1,800 square metres to 2.6 hectares. It is suitable for light to medium industry and businesses can operate 24 hours a day.

== Education ==
There are two schools in Crestmead.

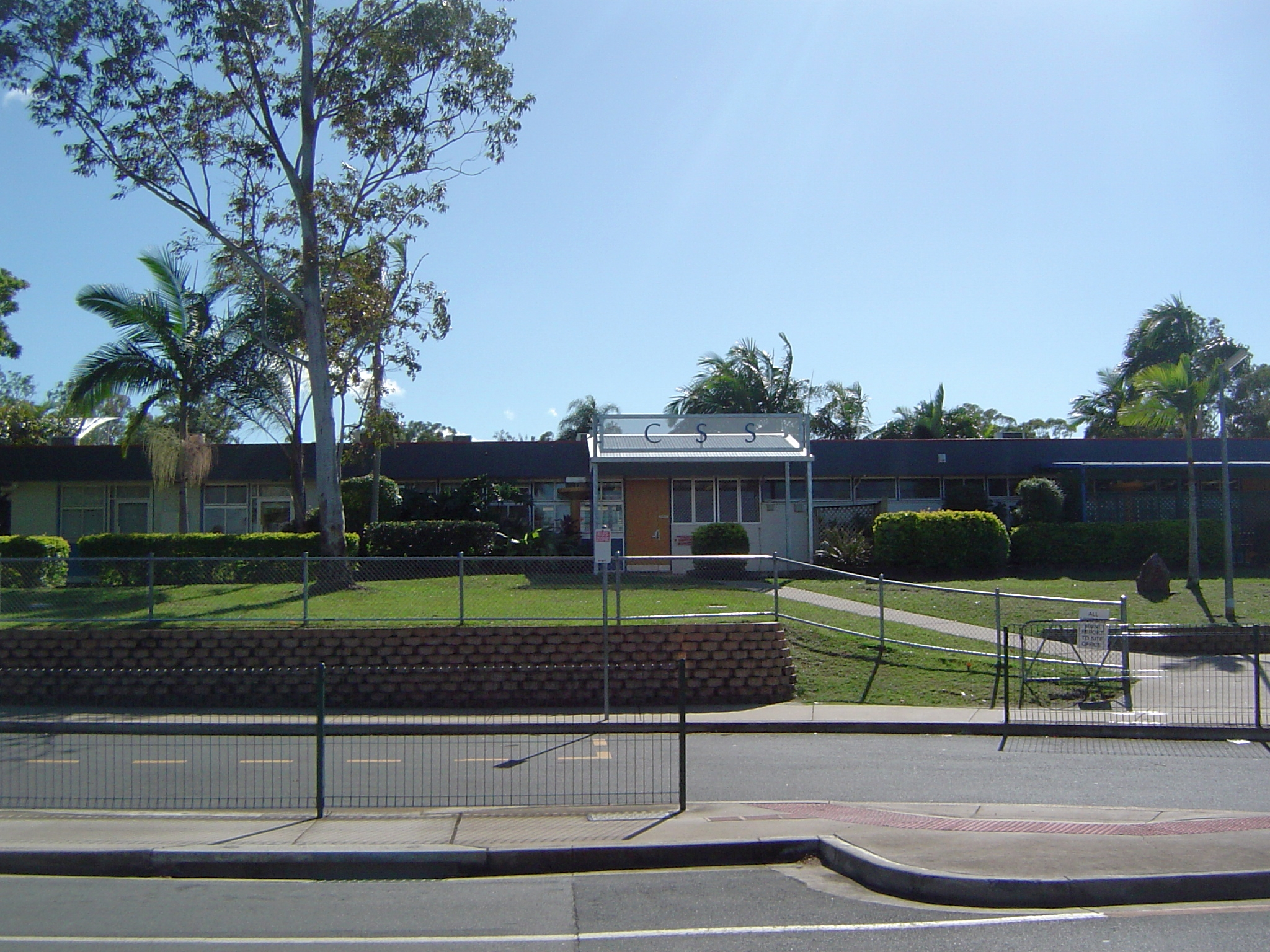
Crestmead State School

Crestmead State School is a government primary (Prep–6) school for boys and girls at 27–61 Augusta Street (27.6887°S 153.0904°E). In 2018, the school had an enrolment of 1,275 students with 95 teachers (90 full-time equivalent) and 55 non-teaching staff (38 full-time equivalent). It includes a special education program. It has become one of the largest public primary schools in the state with enrolments now exceeding 1410.

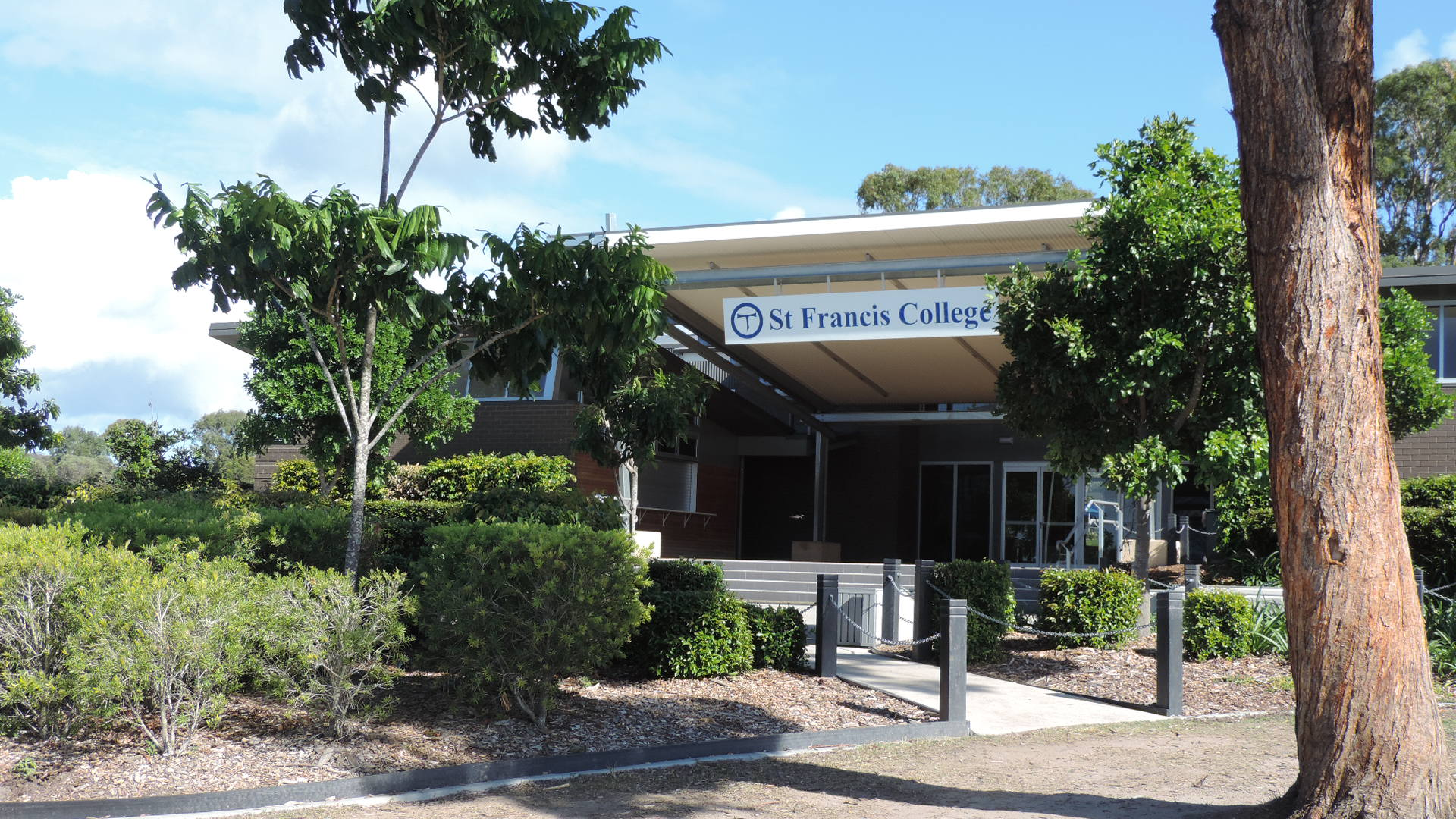
St Francis College, Crestmead, 2014

St Francis' College is a Catholic primary and secondary (Prep–12) school for boys and girls at 64 Julie Street (27.6915°S 153.0822°E). In 2018, the school had an enrolment of 1023 students with 87 teachers (83 full-time equivalent) and 61 non-teaching staff (44 full-time equivalent).

There is no government secondary school in Crestmead. The nearest government secondary school is Marsden State High School in neighbouring Waterford West to the east.

== Amenities ==
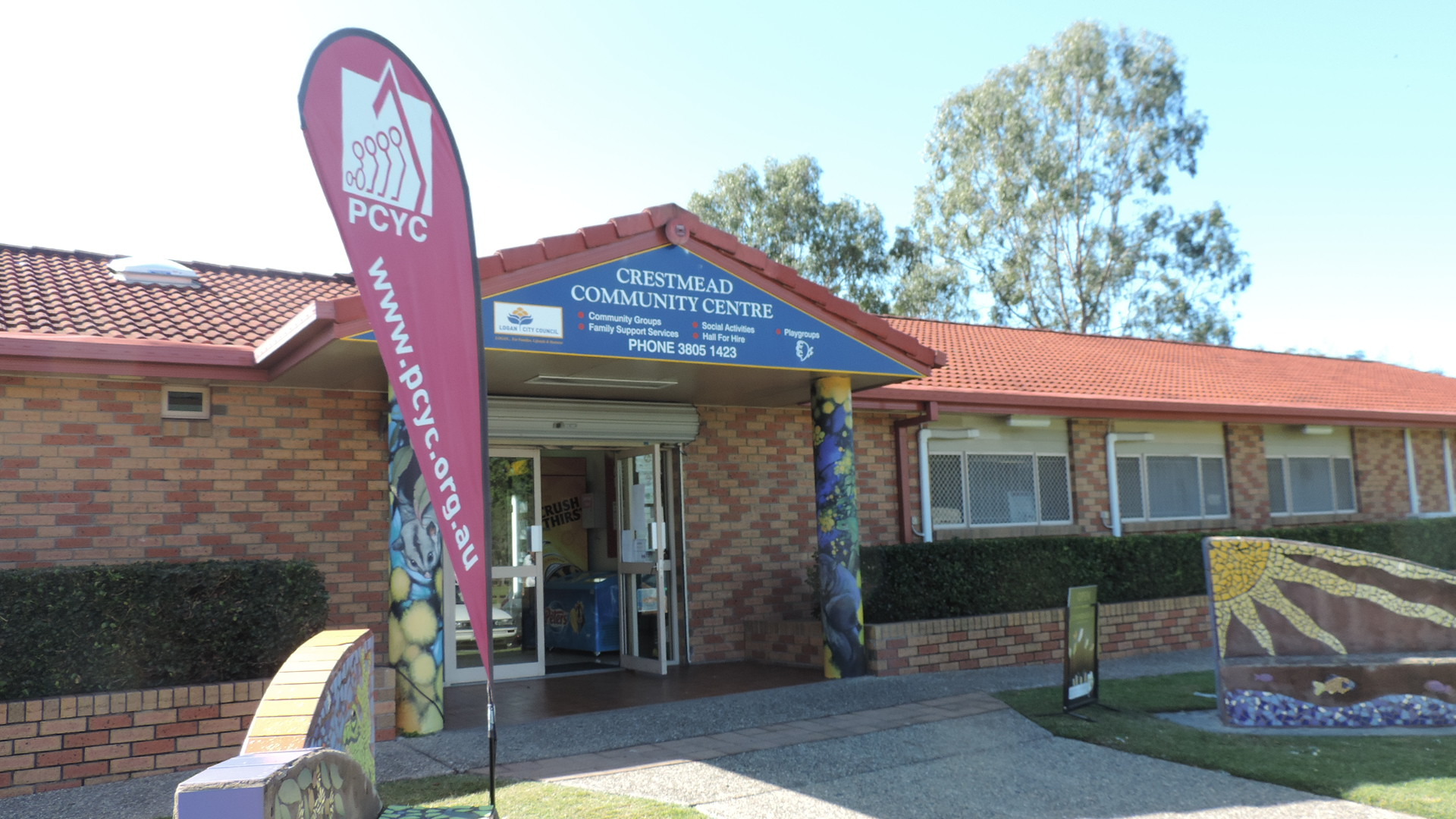
Crestmead Community Centre, 2014

Crestmead Community Centre is in Crestmead Community Park and can be accessed from Gimlet Street (27.6900°S 153.09350°E). It comprises a hall, small meeting rooms and kitchen facilities. A range of activities including dancing and health clinics operate from the centre.

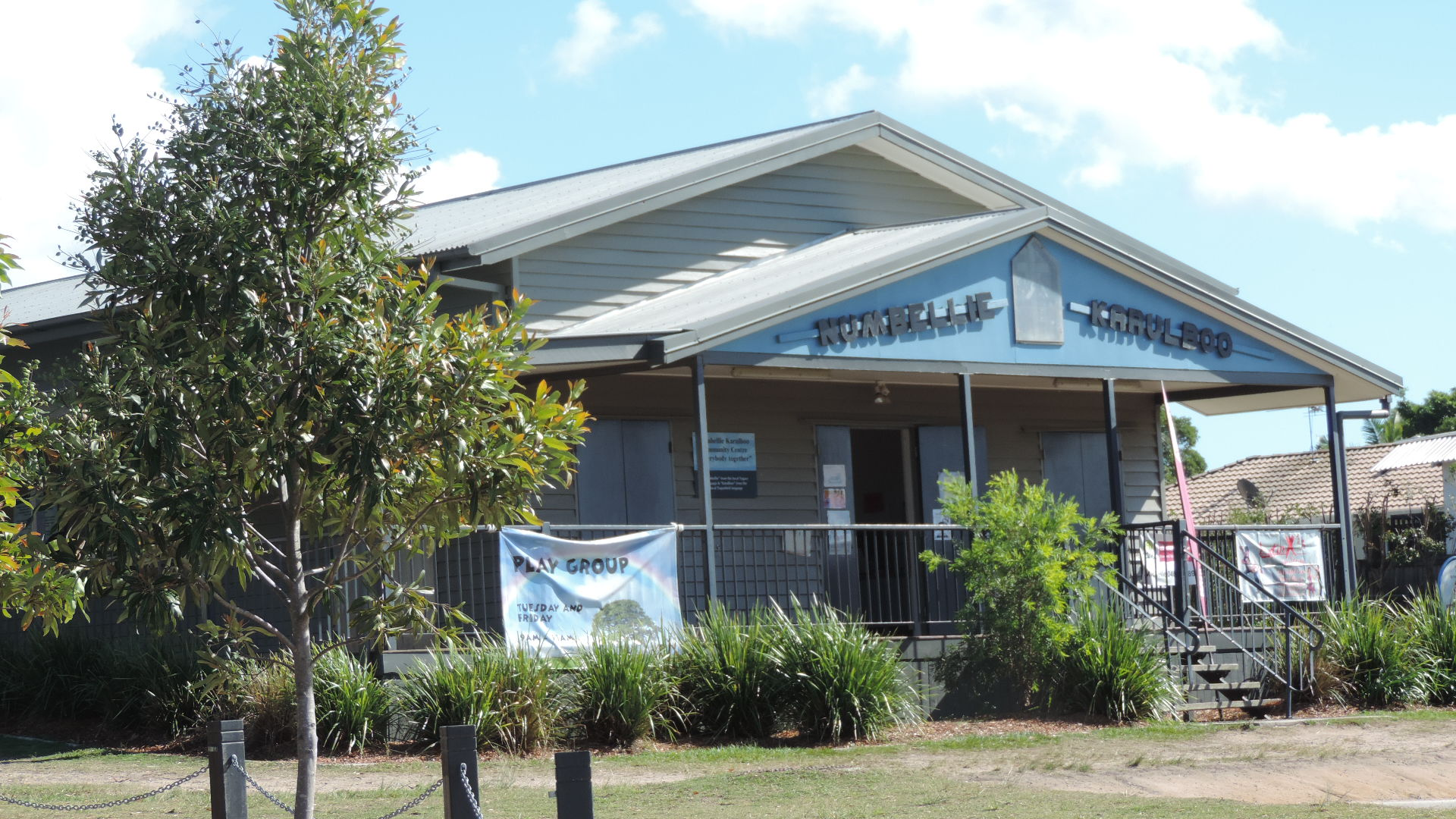
Numbellie Karulboo Community Centre, provided by St Francis College, 2014

Numbellie Karulboo Community Centre is provided on the grounds of St Francis College by the college for use by the community. 'Numbellie Karulboo' means 'everybody together' in the Yuggera and Yugambeh languages. It hosts an indigenous dance group, children's playgroups and cross-cultural programs.
