= Waterford, Queensland =

Waterford
- Town
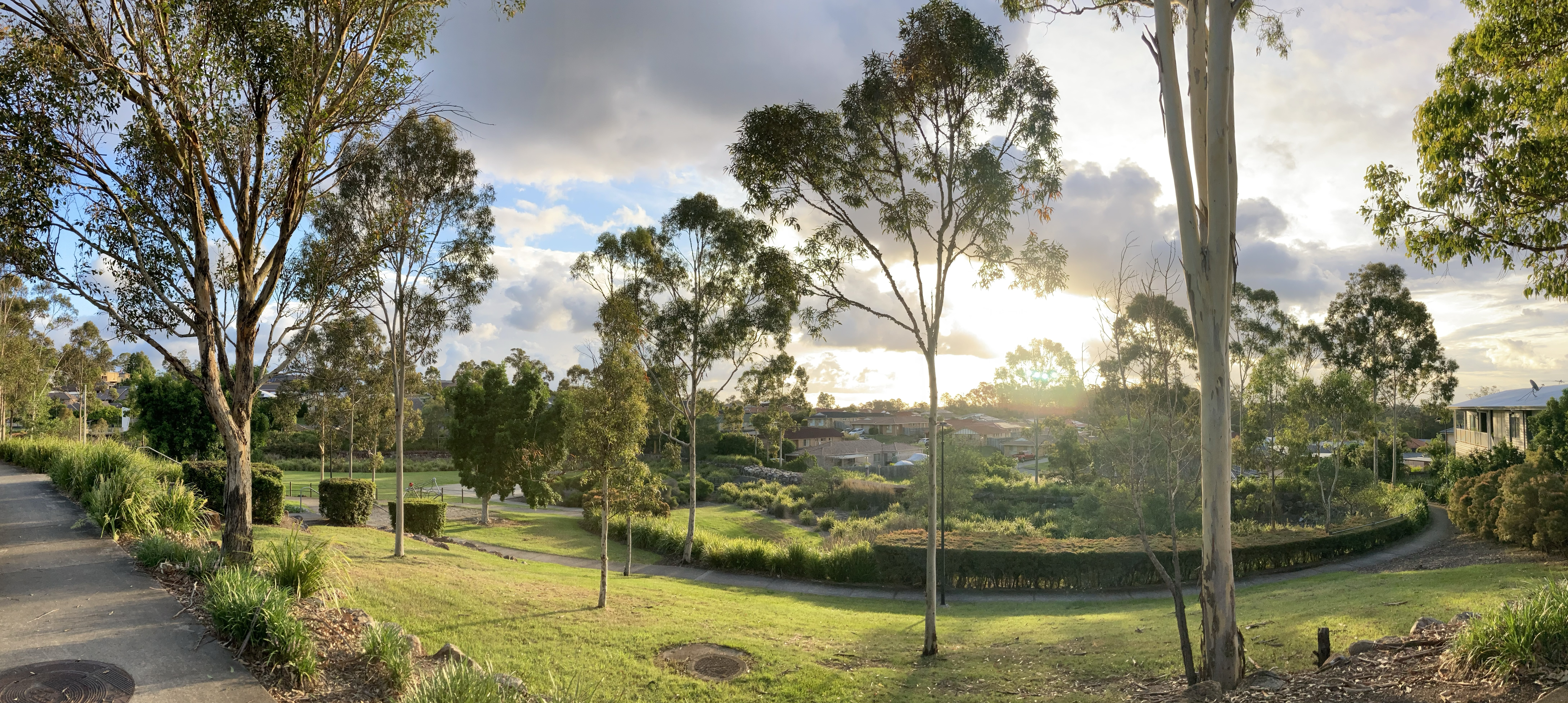
- Looking west from Outlook Drive, 2021

- Coordinates: 27.715°S 153.1427°E
- Country: Australia
- State: Queensland
- City: Logan City
- LGA: Logan City
- Location: 10.9 km (6.8 mi) SE of Logan Central; 33.6 km (20.9 mi) SE of Brisbane CBD; 51 km (32 mi) NNW of Surfers Paradise

Government
  - State electorate: Macalister
  - Federal division: Forde

Area
  - Total: 6.8 km^{2} (2.6 sq mi)
- Elevation: 17 m (56 ft)

Population
  - Total: 5,796 (2021 census)
  - Density: 852/km^{2} (2,208/sq mi)
- Time zone: UTC+10:00 (AEST)
- Postcode: 4133
Localities around Waterford
Waterford West	Loganlea; Bethania	Edens Landing
Logan Reserve	Waterford	Holmview
Logan Reserve	Buccan	Bahrs Scrub

Waterford is a town and suburb in the City of Logan, Queensland, Australia. In the 2021 census, the suburb of Waterford had a population of 5,796 people.

== Geography ==
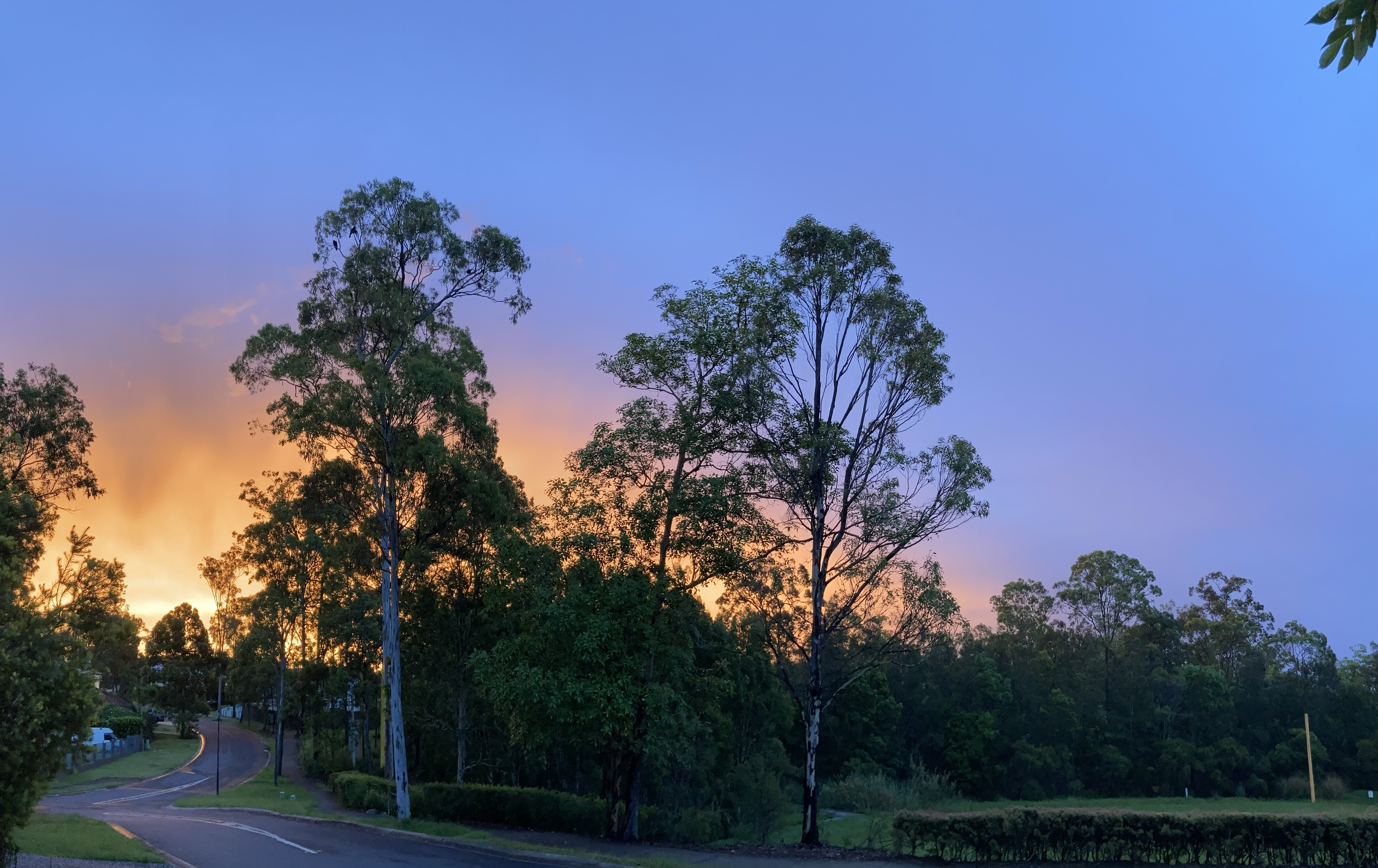
Beautiful sunset after the rain, December 2021. Boulevard Park, Woodlands Boulevard, Waterford QLD

The suburb is on the east side of the Logan River and is 7 km south-east of Logan Central. The western side of the suburb follows the Logan River, while the southern edge draws a straight line along Dairy Creek Road. Here it connects to Gardiner Road which then joins Logan River Road. Waterford-Tamborine Road (State Route 95) starts in the north of Waterford and exits to the south.

== History ==
The town is believed to be named by Irish settlers after Waterford in Ireland because of a ford in the Logan River. The name was recorded by surveyor William Fryar on 11 June 1866. The first town lots were offered for sale in the Town of Waterford in July 1866.

Logan Provisional School opened on 28 June 1869 in Charles Wilson's barn on the east of the Logan River with an initial enrolment of 22 students. On 3 January 1871, the school moved to a new site with a purpose-built 30-by-16-foot (9.1 by 4.9 m) school building, then known as Waterford Primary School, with 25 students. It was later renamed Waterford State School.

The Beaudesert railway line from Bethania to Beaudesert opened on 21 September 1885. Waterford railway station (27.7047°S 153.1481°E) served the town. Due to the rising use of cars, passenger services terminated in 1961 but freight services continued until 20 May 1996.

In 1949, the Apostolic Church at Waterford was demolished and re-erected in East Ipswich.

The College of the Good Shepherd was established on 2 February 1987 by local Anglican Church families wanting a faith-based school in their community. It opened in temporary buildings with 73 students in Years 6 to 8. The school's first permanent buildings were completed in late 1987. It was later renamed Canterbury College.

== Demographics ==
Historical population
Year	Pop.	±%
2006	845	—
2011	3,931	+365.2%
2016	5,484	+39.5%
2021	5,796	+5.7%

In the 2011 census, the suburb of Waterford had a population of 3,931 people, 52.9% female and 47.1% male. The median age of the Waterford population was 33 years, 4 years below the national median of 37. 65.6% of people living in Waterford were born in Australia. The other top responses for country of birth were New Zealand 7.2%, England 4.9%, Scotland 0.9%, Philippines 0.9%, Malaysia 0.8%. 80.2% of people spoke only English at home; the next most common languages were 1.2% Cantonese, 0.7% Romanian, 0.6% Tagalog, 0.5% Hindi, 0.5% Mandarin.

In the 2016 census, the suburb of Waterford had a population of 5,484 people, 52.8% female and 47.2% male. The median age of the Waterford population was 30 years, 8 years below the national median of 38. 65.7% of people living in Waterford were born in Australia. The other top responses for country of birth were New Zealand 9.5%, England 4.3%, India 1.7%, South Africa 0.8% and Afghanistan 0.8%. 79.2% of people spoke only English at home; the next most common languages were 1.1% Samoan, 1.1% Hindi, 0.9% Mandarin, 0.7% Cantonese and 0.6% Hazaraghi.

In the 2021 census, the suburb of Waterford had a population of 5,796 people, 53.1% female and 46.9% male. The median age of the Waterford population was 32 years, 6 years below the national median of 38. 65.8% of people living in Waterford were born in Australia. The other top responses for country of birth were New Zealand 8.7%, England 3.3%, India 2.7%, Afghanistan 1.7% and the Philippines 1.0%. 77.2% of people spoke only English at home; the next most common languages were 1.6% Punjabi, 1.4% Hazaraghi, 1.2% Samoan, 1.2% Hindi, 1.1% Mandarin.

== Heritage listings ==
Waterford has a number of heritage-listed sites, including:

- 40 Nerang Street, cnr Jordan Street: Waterford State School

== Education ==
Waterford State School is a government primary (Early Childhood to Year 6) school for boys and girls at 40 Nerang Street (27.6959°S 153.1454°E). In 2023, the school had an enrolment of 519 students with 40 teachers (35 full-time equivalent) and 36 non-teaching staff (22 full-time equivalent). It includes a special education program.

Canterbury College is an Anglican primary and secondary (Prep–12) school for boys and girls at Old Logan Village Road (27.7099°S 153.1493°E). In 2023, the school had an enrolment of 1,417 students with 120 teachers (118 full-time equivalent) and 83 non-teaching staff (71 full-time equivalent).

There is no government secondary school in Waterford. The nearest government secondary schools are Loganlea State High School in neighbouring Loganlea to the north and Windaroo Valley State High School in neighbouring Bahrs Scrub to the south-east.

== Amenities ==
There is a boat ramp at Albert Street on the south bank of the Logan River (27.6918°S 153.1394°E). It is managed by the Logan City Council.

There are a number of parks in the area:

- Barber Court (27.7047°S 153.1553°E)
- High Road Park (27.7090°S 153.1543°E)
- L Storey Park (27.6921°S 153.1403°E)
- Nerang Street (27.6980°S 153.1467°E)
- Woodlands Boulevard Park (27.7102°S 153.1561°E)

== Transport ==
Public transport includes some local buses in parts of Waterford. The closest train station is in its neighbouring suburb to the north Bethania (a 40-60min walk or 5-10min drive).
