= Park Ridge South, Queensland =

Park Ridge South
- Suburb
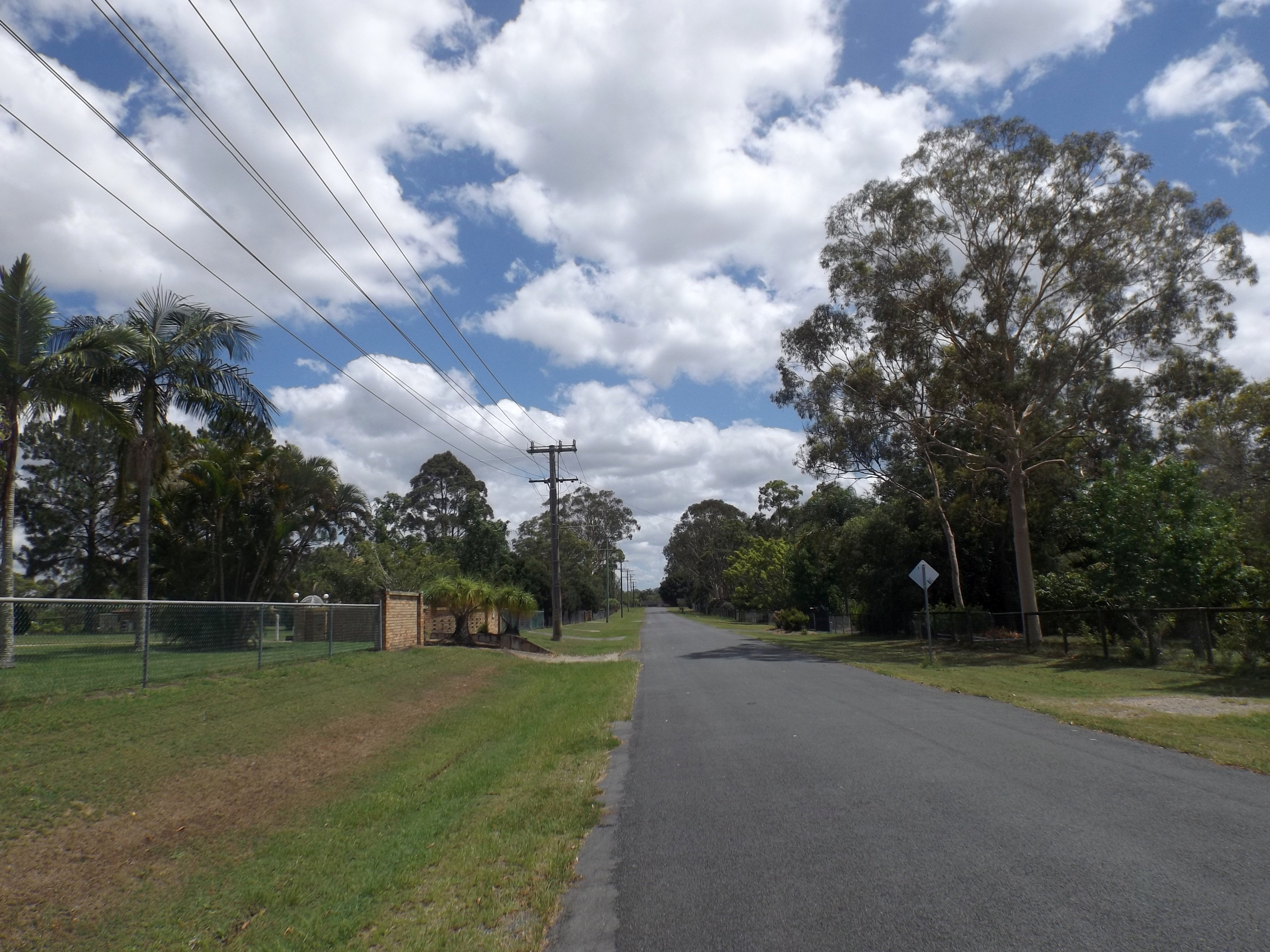
- Solandra Road, 2016

- Interactive map of Park Ridge South
- Coordinates: 27.7272°S 153.0350°E
- Country: Australia
- State: Queensland
- LGA: Logan City
- Location: 13.6 km (8.5 mi) S of Logan Central; 34.9 km (21.7 mi) S of Brisbane CBD
- Established: 1991

Government
  - State electorate: Logan
  - Federal divisions: Forde; Wright

Area
  - Total: 9.1 km^{2} (3.5 sq mi)

Population
  - Total: 1,680 (2021 census)
  - Density: 184.6/km^{2} (478/sq mi)
- Time zone: UTC+10:00 (AEST)
- Postcode: 4125
Suburbs around Park Ridge South
Greenbank	Park Ridge	Park Ridge
Greenbank	Park Ridge South	Chambers Flat
Greenbank	Munruben	Chambers Flat

Park Ridge South is a residential locality in the City of Logan, Queensland, Australia. In the 2021 census, Park Ridge South had a population of 1,680 people.

== Geography ==
The Mount Lindesay Highway enters the locality from the north (Park Ridge) and exits to the south (Munruben), roughly bisecting the locality into east and west sections.

Park Ridge South's western and eastern boundaries adjoin Greenbank and Chambers Flat, and there is a large linear reserve along Chambers Creek's headwaters.

== History ==
Once a rural community, it is developing into a low-density residential area. Park Ridge South was officially gazetted as a locality on 13th April 1991, detaching from Park Ridge. It was previously part of the Beaudesert Shire local government area. Rosia Road and Stoney Camp Road at Park Ridge South formed part of the boundary between the local government areas of Beaudesert Shire and Logan City. The 2008 Queensland Local Government amalgamations saw former suburbs of Beaudesert Shire including Park Ridge South becoming part of Logan City.

== Demographics ==
In the 2011 census, Park Ridge South recorded a population of 1,778 people, 49% female and 51% male. The median age of the Park Ridge South population was 40 years, 3 years above the national median of 37. 73.8% of people living in Park Ridge South were born in Australia. The other top responses for country of birth were England 6.2%, New Zealand 4.6%, Taiwan 1%, China 0.8%, Croatia 0.7%. 84.2% of people spoke only English at home; the next most common languages were 1.7% Khmer, 1.5% Mandarin, 1.1% Hmong, 1% Croatian, 0.7% Italian.

In the 2016 census, Park Ridge South had a population of 1,762 people, 49.3% female and 50.7% male. The median age of the Park Ridge South population was 41 years, 3 years above the national median of 38. 74.5% of people living in Park Ridge South were born in Australia. The other top responses for country of birth were New Zealand 5.1%, England 4.7%, Taiwan 1.6%, Croatia 0.7% and Thailand 0.7%. 84.7% of people spoke only English at home; the next most common languages were 2.0% Mandarin, 1.2% Khmer, 0.9% Croatian, 0.9% Hmong and 0.6% Italian.

In the 2021 census,, Park Ridge South had a population of 1,680 people, 48.5% female and 51.5% male. The median age of the Park Ridge South population was 46 years, 8 years above the national median of 38. 73.5% of people living in Park Ridge South were born in Australia. The other top responses for country of birth were England 4.5%, New Zealand 4.3%, Taiwan 1.6%, China (excludes SARs and Taiwan) 1.2%, and Laos 0.7%. 83.3% of people spoke only English at home; the next most common languages were 2.4% Mandarin, 1.4% Hmong, 1.0% Arabic, 1.0% Croatian, 1.0% and Khmer.

== Education ==
There are no schools in Park Ridge South. The nearest government primary schools are Park Ridge State School in neighbouring Park Ridge to the north and Greenbank State School in neighbouring Greenbank to the west. The nearest government secondary school is Park Ridge State High School in Park Ridge.
