= Logan Reserve, Queensland =

Logan Reserve
- Suburb
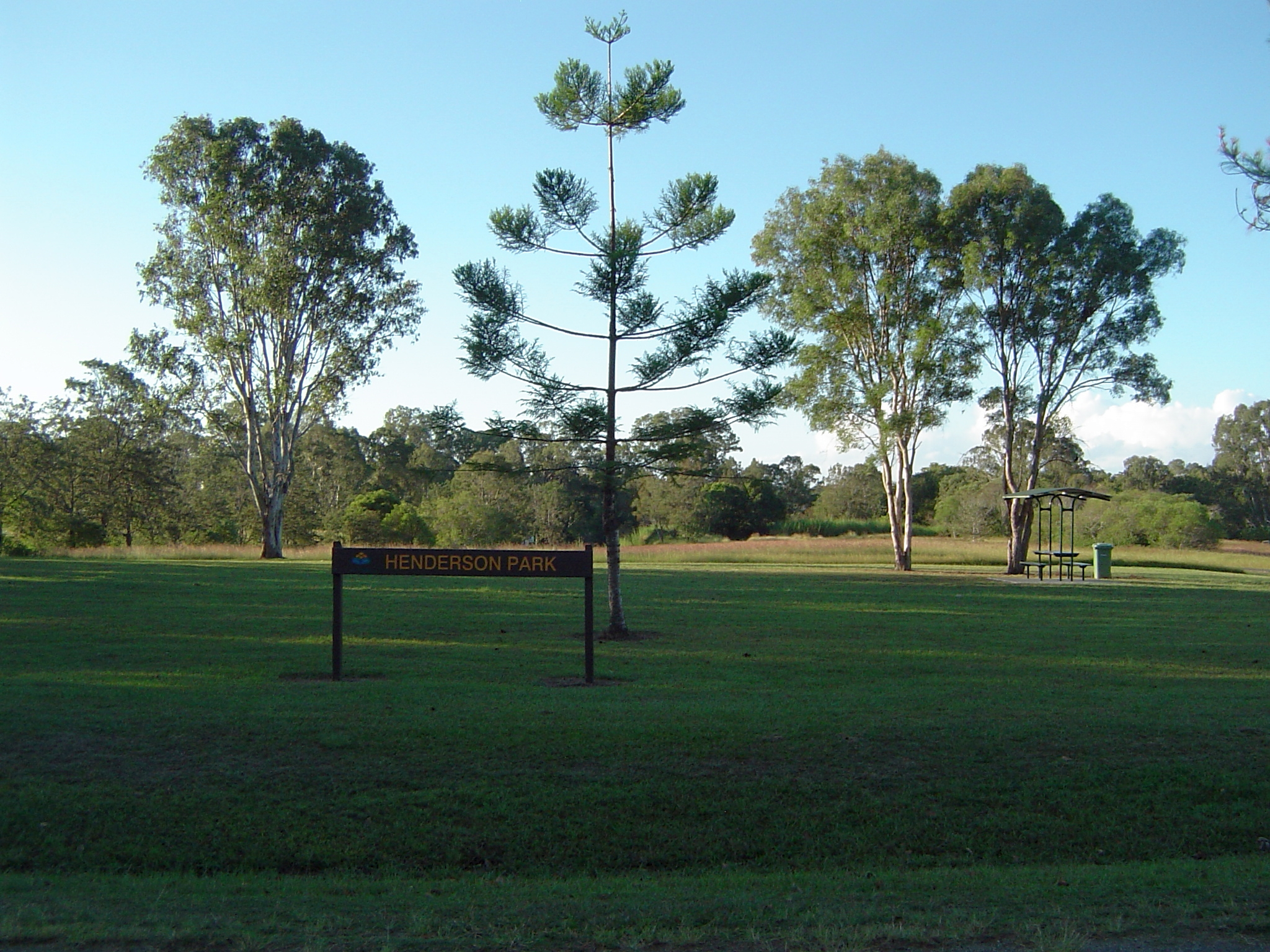
- Henderson Park, 2014

- Interactive map of Logan Reserve
- Coordinates: 27.7169°S 153.1066°E
- Country: Australia
- State: Queensland
- City: Logan City
- LGA: Logan City
- Location: 10.0 km (6.2 mi) S of Logan Central; 35.3 km (21.9 mi) S of Brisbane CBD
- Established: 1862

Government
  - State electorates: Logan; Waterford
  - Federal division: Forde

Area
  - Total: 14.6 km^{2} (5.6 sq mi)

Population
  - Total: 7,016 (2021 census)
  - Density: 480.5/km^{2} (1,245/sq mi)
- Time zone: UTC+10:00 (AEST)
- Postcode: 4133
Suburbs around Logan Reserve
Crestmead	Waterford West	Waterford
Park Ridge	Logan Reserve	Buccan
Chambers Flat	Chambers Flat	Buccan

Logan Reserve is a rural residential suburb in the City of Logan, Queensland, Australia. In the 2021 census, Logan Reserve had a population of 7,016 people.

== Geography ==
Logan Reserve offers acreage bushland homes and a few suburban-style streets to its north. Most properties here range from two to ten acres, with dwelling types varying between cottage style, Tudor, large western red cedar and large country estates.

== History ==
The birth of Logan Reserve came in 1862, when 500,000 acres of the Logan Agricultural Reserve were released for use by settlers. Cotton was the first crop grown, and in 1864 to 1865 a small bark church/school became the first public building to be erected. Early settlers hailed from Yorkshire and timber-getting and farming were the primary industries during the 1890s and remained important through to the early 20th century, when tobacco growing was taken on.

Logan Roman Catholic Non-Vested School opened circa 1864. It was taken over by the Queensland Government on 1 February 1875 and in 1876 it became Logan Reserve Provisional School in 1876. On 1 August 1914, it became Logan Reserve State School.

== Demographics ==
In the 2011 census, Logan Reserve had a population of 2,154 people, 49.9% female and 50.1% male. The median age of the Logan Reserve population was 30 years, 7 years below the national median of 37. 71.6% of people living in Logan Reserve were born in Australia. The other top responses for country of birth were New Zealand 6.6%, England 4.6%, Cambodia 1.8%, Samoa 1.3%, Fiji 1.1%. 81.3% of people spoke only English at home; the next most common languages were Khmer 3%, Samoan 2.5%, Hmong 1.9%, Vietnamese 1.3% and Hindi 0.6%.

In the 2016 census, Logan Reserve had a population of 3,521 people, 50.1% female and 49.9% male. The median age in Logan Reserve population was 29 years, 9 years below the national median of 38. 67.3% of people living in Logan Reserve were born in Australia. The other top responses for country of birth were New Zealand 8.6%, England 3.3%, Cambodia 1.5%, Samoa 0.9%, Philippines 0.8%. 79.4% of people only spoke English at home; the next most common languages were Khmer 2.5%, Samoan 1.7%, Hindi 0.8%, Arabic 0.7% and Vietnamese 0.7%.

In the 2021 census, Logan Reserve had a population of 7,016 people, 51.3% female and 48.7% male. The median age in Logan Reserve was 27 years, 11 years below the national and state median of 38. 59.1% of people living in Logan Reserve were born in Australia. The other top responses for country of birth were New Zealand 10.1%, India 3.1%, Afghanistan 2.3%, England 1.8%, Philippines 1.3%. 64.5% of people spoke only English at home; the next most common languages were Samoan 3%, Hazaraghi 2.3%, Punjabi 2.2%, Arabic 1.4% and Urdu 1.2%.

== Education ==
Logan Reserve State School is a government primary (Prep-6) school for boys and girls at 369-379 School Road (27.7140°S 153.1144°E). In 2017, the school had an enrolment of 512 students with 36 teachers (32 full-time equivalent) and 22 non-teaching staff (15 full-time equivalent). It includes a special education program.

There are no secondary schools in Logan Reserve. The nearest government secondary school is Marsden State High School in neighbouring Waterford West.
