= Waterford West, Queensland =

Waterford West
- Suburb
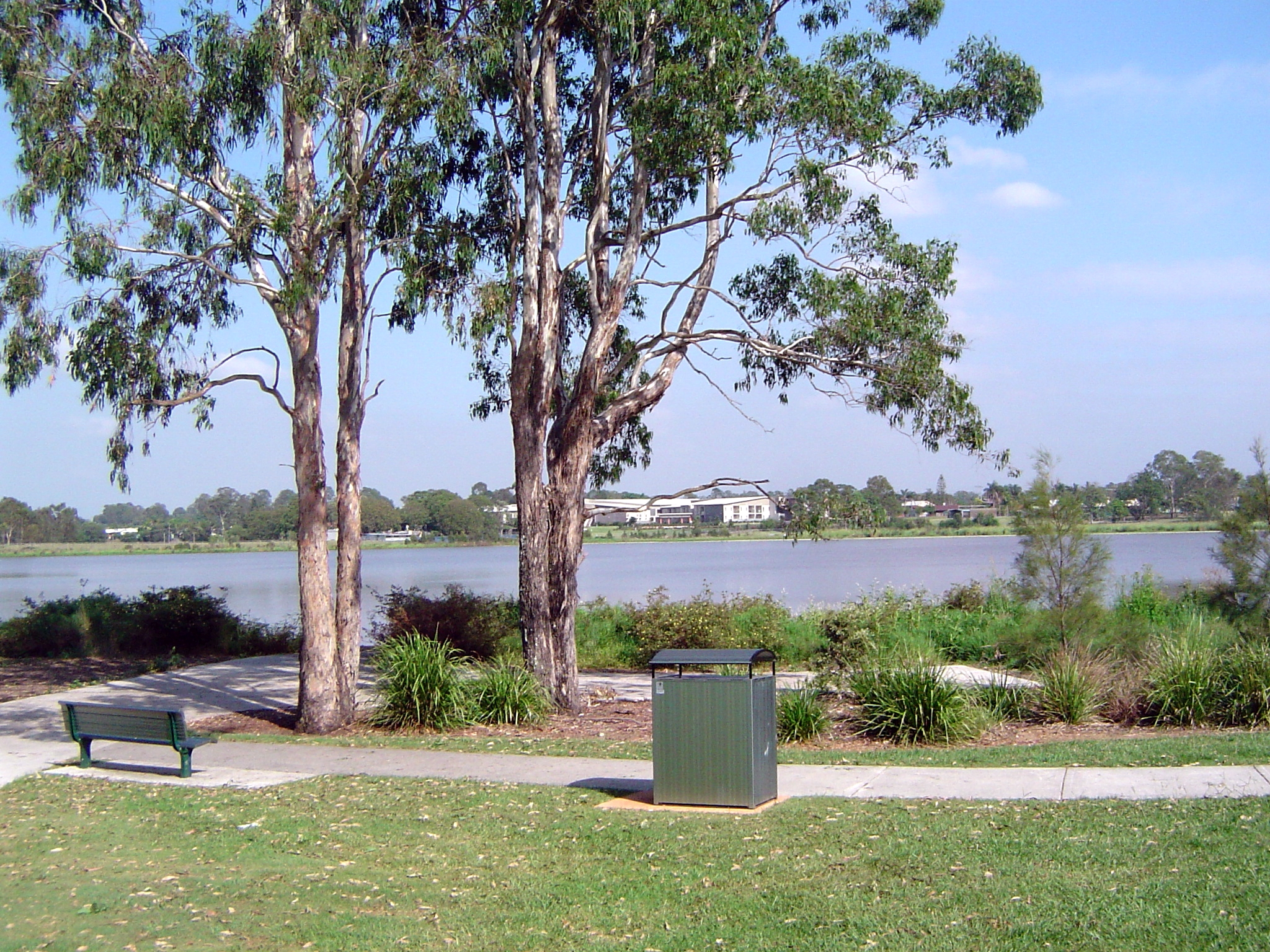
- Tygum Lagoon, 2013

- Interactive map of Waterford West
- Coordinates: 27.6913°S 153.1280°E
- Country: Australia
- State: Queensland
- City: Logan City
- LGA: Logan City
- Location: 7 km (4.3 mi) SSE of Logan Central; 31.2 km (19.4 mi) S of Brisbane CBD; 55 km (34 mi) NNW of Surfers Paradise

Government
  - State electorate: Waterford
  - Federal division: Forde

Area
  - Total: 5.3 km^{2} (2.0 sq mi)
- Elevation: 16 m (52 ft)

Population
  - Total: 6,942 (2021 census)
  - Density: 1,310/km^{2} (3,390/sq mi)
- Time zone: UTC+10:00 (AEST)
- Postcode: 4133
Suburbs around Waterford West
Kingston	Loganlea	Loganlea
Marsden	Waterford West	Waterford
Crestmead	Logan Reserve	Waterford

Waterford West is a suburb in the City of Logan, Queensland, Australia. In the 2021 census, Waterford West had a population of 6,942 people.

== Geography ==
The suburb is west of the Logan River and Waterford. The eastern boundary and part of the southern boundary follow the course of the Logan River.

The suburb is home to Marsden State High School in the west.

It has a shopping centre called Waterford Plaza close to a road bridge across the Logan. Around this area the main roads, Kingston Road and Loganlea Road intersect. The area currently has some retail development as well as historical significance to Logan City. The centre adjoins a large lagoon known as Tygum Lagoon.

== History ==
In April 1885, several portions of subdivided land in an area known as Waterford North and South were advertised for auction by John Cameron. A map advertising the land shows the location of the subdivisions in proximity to the Upper Logan railway line and Tweed railway line and the Logan River. The land was owned by Henry Jordan and a supplement advertising the auction states that there was a quarry and sawmill on the land as well as two lagoons supplying fresh and pure water.

Residential development began in Waterford West in the 1970s, with a drive-in theater being built in 1974. Waterford West was affected by the 1974 Brisbane floods, with two houses being washed away, however, the bridge remained intact. In 1978, Waterford was split into two, with Waterford West officially becoming a suburb in 1987.

The Waterford West State School opened on 27 January 1976, and the Marsden State High School opened on 27 January 1987.

== Demographics ==
In the 2011 census, Waterford West recorded a population of 6,160 people, 51.2% female and 48.8% male. The median age of the Waterford West population was 33 years, 4 years below the national median of 37. 66.8% of people living in Waterford West were born in Australia. The other top responses for country of birth were New Zealand 8.7%, England 4.9%, Philippines 0.9%, Samoa 0.8%, Fiji 0.7%. 81.5% of people spoke only English at home; the next most common languages were 2% Samoan, 1.3% Khmer, 0.8% Romanian, 0.6% Hindi, 0.5% Tagalog.

In the 2016 census, Waterford West had a population of 6,431 people, 52.5% female and 47.5% male. The median age of the Waterford West population was 37 years, 1 year below the national median of 38. 61.8% of people living in Waterford West were born in Australia. The other top responses for country of birth were New Zealand 9.6%, England 4.5%, Samoa 1.6%, Philippines 1.2%, and India 1.0%. 75.5% of people spoke only English at home; the next most common languages were 3.2% Samoan, 1.7% Khmer, 1.1% Arabic, 1.0% Hindi, and 0.8% Tagalog.

As of the 2021 census, the population further grew to 6,942 people, 51.9% female and 48.1% male. The median age of the Waterford West population was 36 years, 2 years below the national median of 38. 57.8% of people living in Waterford West were born in Australia. The other top responses for country of birth were New Zealand 8.0%, England 3.4%, India 2.6%, the Philippines 1.6% and Cambodia 1.2%. Although Waterford West's population makes up less than 0.028 percent of Australia's population, its Cambodia-born population makes up about 0.21 percent of Australia's entire Cambodia-born population. 67.7% of people spoke only English at home; the next most common languages were 2.1% Samoan, 1.9% Punjabi, 1.8% Khmer, 1.6% Arabic, 1.2% Hindi.

== Education ==
Waterford West State School is a government primary (Prep–6) school for boys and girls at John Street (27.6912°S 153.1315°E). In 2018, the school had an enrolment of 674 students with 52 teachers (49 full-time equivalent) and 32 non-teaching staff (21 full-time equivalent). It includes a special education program.

Marsden State High School is a government secondary (7–12) school for boys and girls at 106–130 Muchow Road (27.6847°S 153.1114°E). In 2018, the school had an enrolment of 2,199 students with 161 teachers (154 full-time equivalent) and 94 non-teaching staff (71 full-time equivalent). It includes a special education program. In March 2024, it was the largest high school by enrolments in Australia, exceeding 4,000 students.

== Amenities ==
Logan Wesleyan Methodist Church is at 877 Kingston Road (27.6918°S 153.1295°E); it is part of the Wesleyan Methodist Church of Australia.
