= Marsden State High School =

Secondary school in Queensland, Australia

Location
- Logan City, Queensland; Australia; 27.6852°S 153.1106°E

Information
- Type: Co-education, secondary, public
- Motto: Success Through Industry (1987–2010); Empowering Individuals, Expanding Horizons, Creating Futures (2010–2012); Dare to Inspire, Make a Difference (2013–present)
- Established: 1987
- Principal: Marcus Jones
- Grades: 7–12
- Enrolment: 3,702 (2023)
- Colours: Maroon and ash

Marsden State High School (MSHS) is a public co-educational secondary school located in the Logan City suburb of Waterford West, Queensland, Australia. It is administered by the Department of Education, with an enrolment of 3,823 students and a teaching staff of 261, as of 2024. The school serves students from Year 7 to Year 12, and is the largest high school by enrolments in Australia, exceeding 4,000 students in March 2024.

== History ==
The school opened on 27 January 1987, in the suburb's west.

In 2013, a vegemite sandwich was thrown at the then prime minister, Julia Gillard, by a student, the student who was caught denied any wrongdoing of the incident and was promptly suspended. His suspension lasted three weeks, and he later "confronted her on radio to protest his innocence," the prime minister laughed it off and "sort of" sympathised, but did not help to appeal his suspension.

On 9 November 2015, investigators started talking to students about the disappearance of student Tiahleigh Palmer. Approximately 70 students were questioned by police as of 11 November, with investigators encouraging students to speak up if they had any knowledge regarding her disappearance and eventual death. The incident prompted a debate on school security.

In 2018, Marsden was selected as School of the Year for South East Queensland by The South East Showcase Awards, and in 2020, it was named the 'best public school in the country' due to being the finalist in nine out of the twenty-five categories in the Australian Education Awards, an all-time record.

A brawl between Marsden students and a member of the public occurred in 2020, with footage being uploaded to social media. A police investigation was prompted by the incident.

The school was brought into the public eye again in 2025, due to a teacher allegedly identifying as a cat. The teacher, who was purported to tell students to refer to her as 'Miss Purr' whilst wearing cat ears, was removed from the school.

Student enrollment was recorded at 4,043 in March 2024, even though the school's maximum enrollment capacity peaked at 3,444 students. It was estimated if current trends continue, student enrollment could reach 4,882 within four years (2028). Land in Logan Reserve was acquired by the state government to construct a new school in order to relieve the pressure on Marsden State High.

== Programs ==
The school's current sporting, academic and awareness programs are:

- MTC – Mates Talk Change, a program encouraging good mental health provides a variety of positive mental strategies, including Top 5 Squad
- ELP – Exceptional Learners Program, a discipline for high achievers
- Soccer Excellence – a popular sporting excellence program
- Rugby League Excellence – a popular sporting excellence, see notable alumni.
- Basketball Excellence – a popular sporting excellence program

=== Basketball Team Achievements ===
==== Championship Women (Open) ====
- Australian Schools Championships

(bronze) Third Place: 2023

- Dance Excellence – a program in which exceptional dancers join
- Music Excellence – Exceptional students can choose to sing or play an instrument
- The Arts – The arts is a group of subjects in the creative fields such as Music, Dance, Film & Television and art.
- AVID – A class built on traditional American-style AVID principles.
- M.A.D. – Make a difference program, bringing change to the community.

== Notable alumni ==
This is a list of the Notable alumni of Marsden State High School in alphabetical order, by last name.

- Corey Allan – rugby league player with the Sydney Roosters.
- Israel Folau – rugby league player with the Catalans Dragons, former Australian rules and former Rugby Union player for the New South Wales Waratahs.
- Hulita Haukinima – Queensland Firebirds netball player.
- Brenko Lee – current NRL player for Dolphins.
- Patrick Mago – former NRL player for Brisbane Broncos and South Sydney Rabbitohs, currently with the Super League team Wigan.
- Tesi Niu – rugby league player with the Dolphins.
- Tiahleigh Palmer – student who was murdered by her foster father in 2015.
- Chris Sandow – rugby league player.
- Cameron Smith – rugby league former player with the Melbourne Storm.
- Jaydn Su'A – rugby league player with the St George Illawarra Dragons.
- Caleb Timu – former NRL player for the Brisbane Broncos, former Rugby Union player for the Queensland Reds, Australia national rugby union team Wallabies, and Montpellier Hérault Rugby.
- Joe Tomane – former professional rugby league footballer, now rugby union player.
- Antonio Winterstein – rugby league player.

== See also ==
- List of schools in Greater Brisbane
