= Park Ridge, Queensland =

Park Ridge
- Suburb
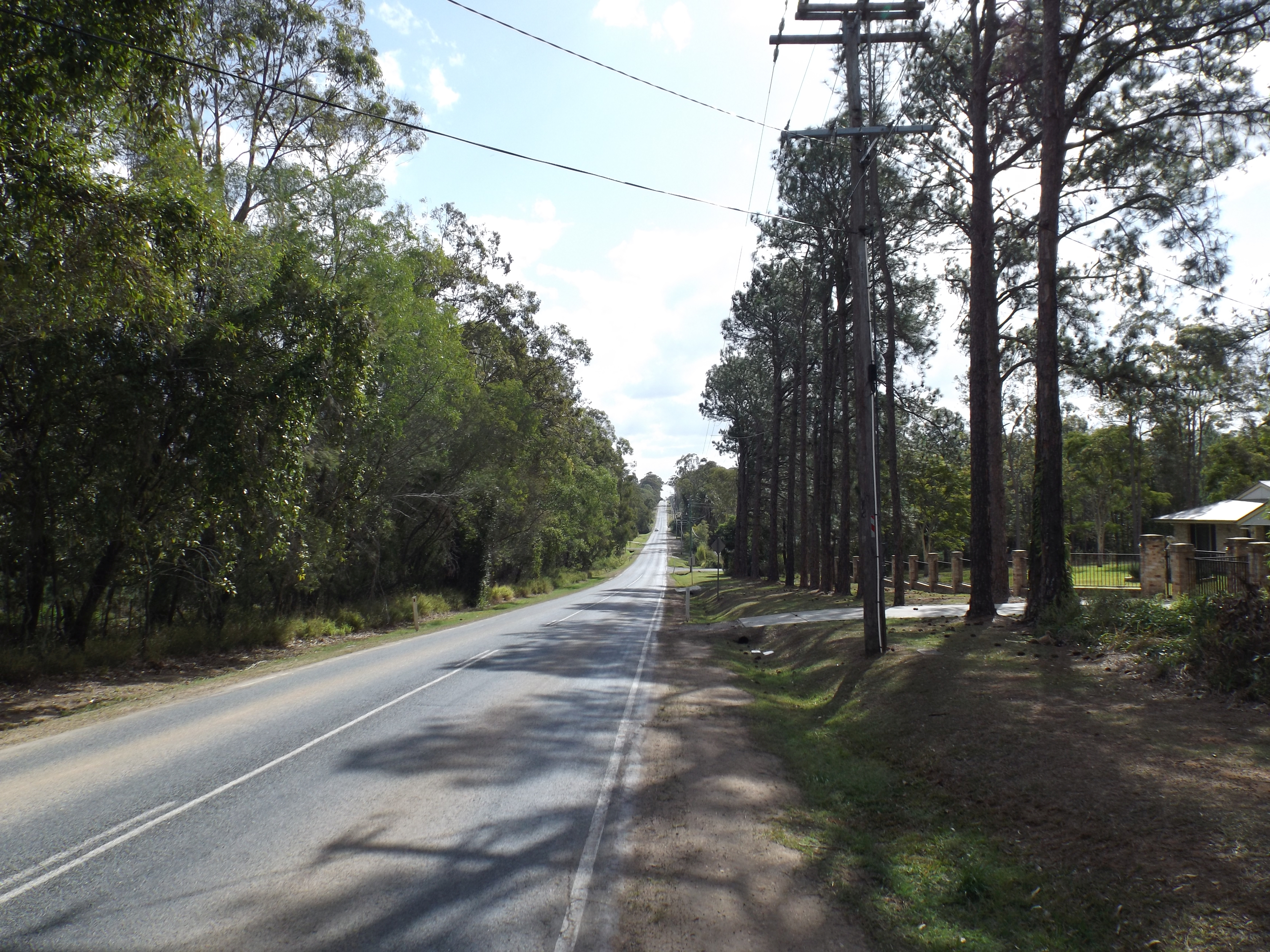
- Park Ridge Road, 2014

- Interactive map of Park Ridge
- Coordinates: 27.7041°S 153.0633°E
- Country: Australia
- State: Queensland
- City: Logan City
- LGA: Logan City
- Location: 9.3 km (5.8 mi) SW of Logan Central; 34.5 km (21.4 mi) S of Brisbane CBD

Government
  - State electorate: Logan
  - Federal division: Forde

Area
  - Total: 16.8 km^{2} (6.5 sq mi)

Population
  - Total: 8,455 (2021 census)
  - Density: 503.3/km^{2} (1,303/sq mi)
- Time zone: UTC+10:00 (AEST)
- Postcode: 4125
Suburbs around Park Ridge
| Regents Park | Heritage Park | Crestmead |
| Boronia Heights | Park Ridge | Logan Reserve |
| Greenbank | Park Ridge South | Chambers Flat |

Park Ridge is a suburb in the City of Logan, located within the south of the Brisbane metropolitan area in Queensland, Australia. In the 2021 census, Park Ridge had a population of 8,455 people.

== Geography ==
Park Ridge lies to Logan's west and enjoys a rural setting. There are acreage properties buffered by bushland. The suburb is dissected by Park Ridge Road in an east-west direction, while its western and eastern boundaries are marked by the Mount Lindesay Highway and Chambers Flat Road respectively.

== History ==
Logan Ridges was the original name for the suburb of Park Ridge. This was until the early 1890s, when the post office changed its name to reflect the park-like nature of the area.

Early settlers hailed from Yorkshire and timber-getting and farming were the primary industries during the 1890s and remained important through to the early 20th century, when tobacco growing was taken on. Success was fleeting and eventually poultry farming came to the fore; Ingham's Chickens becoming a major employer.

Park Ridge Provisional School opened on 23 April 1895 located between Rosia Road and Hillcrest Road; it became a state school on 1 January 1909. Unfortunately, the building did not have ant caps on the stumps and eventually the white ants damaged the building. In 1915, the school relocated to its present site where the (then) disused Browns Plains Provision School had been relocated.

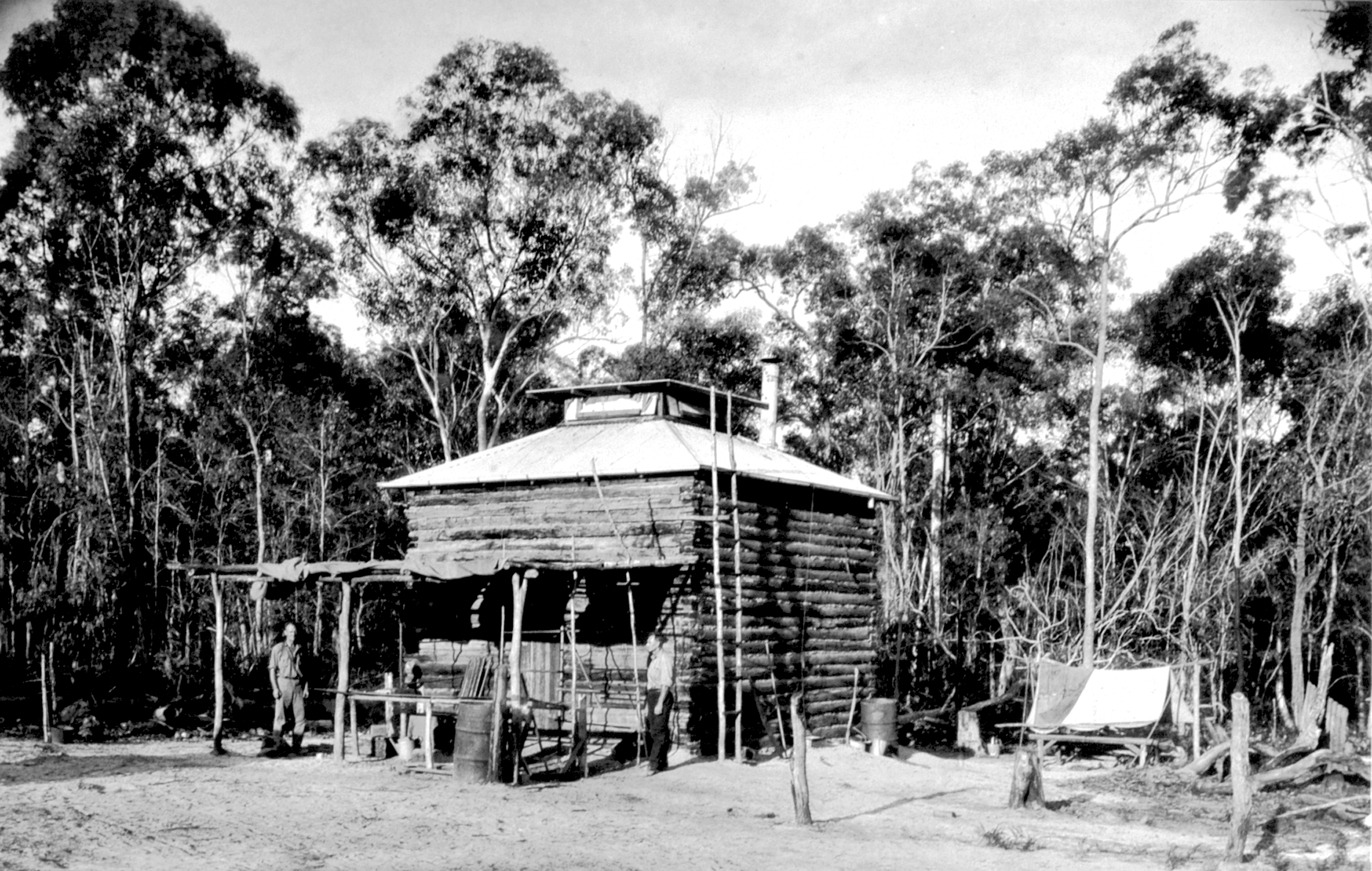
Log barn for curing tobacco, Park Ridge, 1933

In the 1930s, Park Ridge was the centre for tobacco farming.

Park Ridge State High School opened on 29 January 1991.

In 1996, the population of Park Ridge was 1,549 people. 71% of the homes in Park Ridge were owner-occupied.

Saint Philomena School opened on 2 February 1999 on 11 acres (4.5 ha) of rural land. It is affiliated with the Society of St Pius X.

Parklands Christian College opened on 11 April 2001.

== Demographics ==
In the 2011 census, Park Ridge recorded a population of 2,328 people, 48.3% male and 51.7% female. The median age of the Park Ridge population was 54 years, 17 years above the national median of 37. 62.1% of people living in Park Ridge were born in Australia. The other top responses for country of birth were England 9.8%, New Zealand 5.2%, Taiwan 4.1%, Scotland 1.4%, and the Netherlands 1.3%. 80.8% of people spoke only English at home; the next most common languages were 5.6% Mandarin, 1.2% Vietnamese, 0.8% Dutch, 0.6% German, 0.6% Slovak.

In the 2016 census, Park Ridge had a population of 2,503 people.

In the 2021 census, Park Ridge's population grew to 8,455 people, 47.3% male and 52.7% female. The median age was 30 years, eight years below the national median of 38. 56.4% of residents were born in Australia, the other top responses for country of birth being New Zealand 9.6%, India 5.7%, England 3.2%, the Philippines 1.6% and Samoa 1.2%. 65.6% of residents spoke only English at home, the next most common languages being Punjabi 5.6%, Samoan 2.4%, Mandarin 2%, Hindi 1.3% and Urdu 0.8%.

== Education ==
Park Ridge State School is a government primary (Prep–6) school for boys and girls at 3776 Mt Lindesay Highway (27.7016°S 153.0388°E). In 2017, the school had an enrolment of 577 students with 43 teachers (38 full-time equivalent) and 28 non-teaching staff (17 full-time equivalent). It includes a special education program.

Saint Philomena School is a private primary and secondary (Prep–12) school for boys and girls at 61–71 Koplick Road (27.7208°S 153.0841°E). In 2017, the school had an enrolment of 171 students with 16 teachers (15 full-time equivalent) and 9 non-teaching staff (6 full-time equivalent).

Parklands Christian College is a private primary and secondary (Prep–12) school for boys and girls at 11 Hillcrest Road (27.7157°S 153.0356°E). In 2017, the school had an enrolment of 654 students with 44 teachers (40 full-time equivalent) and 60 non-teaching staff (44 full-time equivalent).

Park Ridge State High School is a government secondary (7–12) school for boys and girls at 14–30 Lancewood Street (27.7003°S 153.0337°E). In 2017, the school had an enrolment of 1176 students with 98 teachers (96 full-time equivalent) and 60 non-teaching staff (41 full-time equivalent). It includes a special education program.

== Amenities ==
There are a number of parks in the area:

- Hubner Park (27.7047°S 153.0560°E)
- Park Ridge District Park (27.7039°S 153.0770°E)

== See also ==
- List of Brisbane suburbs
