= Park Ridge State High School =

Location
- 14–30 Lancewood Street; Park Ridge, Queensland; Australia; 27.7007°S 153.034868°E

Information
- Type: Public, secondary
- Motto: Excellence in all we do
- Established: 1991
- Principal: Sharon Amos
- Grades: 7–12
- Enrolment: 1769 (2026)
- Colours: Dark green, white and black

Park Ridge State High School is a public, co-educational high school located in the suburb of Park Ridge, Queensland, Australia. It is administered by the Department of Education, with an enrolment of 1769 students and a teaching staff of 130 as of 2026.

In 2026, Park Ridge State High School was awarded Secondary School of the Year (Government) at the Australian Education Awards hosted in Sydney.

Since 2015, the school's role of Executive Principal has been held by Sharon Amos. The school also consists of one Associate Principal, four Deputy Principals, fifteen Heads of Department, six Year Level Coordinators, two Guidance Officers, one school Chaplain and one Youth Support Coordinator.

== History ==
The school opened on 29 January 1991.

Recently, the school opened a Wellbeing Hub with student access to Guidance Officers, a Youth Support Coordinator, a Chaplain, a weekly General Practitioner and a school-based nurse.

As part of supporting pathways, the school offers on-campus senior enrolment into its Health Hub, Horticulture Hub, Hospitality Hub, or connection to a variety of vocational education and training programs off-campus.

The school is known for its AFL Excellence Academy and IMEX instrumental music excellence program. The school hosts academic excellence programs, music excellence programs, sporting excellence programs and collaborations with The University of Queensland, Griffith University, University of Southern Queensland and other professional development projects across South-East Queensland.

The school is a member of the ENABLE Coalition, an innovative and dynamic collaboration of 14 Logan state high schools. Sharon Amos serves as the current chair.

The school's sporting district is Metropolitan West.

In the Australian Education Awards 2026 hosted in Sydney, Park Ridge State High School won the award of Secondary School of the Year (Government) for their decade-long growth in innovative pedagogy, student outcomes and attendance engagement, nationally recognising the growth potential of the city of Logan. Executive Principal Sharon Amos was recognised as a finalist for Principal of Year for the second consecutive year. Head of Department (Mathematics) Rebecca Isakson was recognised as a finalist and top awardee for Department Head of the Year for a second consecutive year.

== Extra-curricular activities ==
Activities at Park Ridge State High School include:

- Student Voice Committee (student council)
- Student newsletter committee "The Parky Post"
- Student socials committee
- Fundraisers
- Environmental plan (recycling, container collection, compost and horticulture plot)
- Leadership Excellence workshops and projects
- IGNITE Program
- STEM challenges
- Sporting groups
- Instrumental music & IMEX Program
- Musicals & plays
- Arts showcases
- Dance troupes
- Vocal choir groups
- Audio-Visual production team
- Multicultural celebrations
- Annual carnival and termly celebrations recognising positive behaviour and high attendance
- AFL Excellence Academy

=== AFL Excellence Team Achievements ===
==== Senior Female (Years 10-12) ====
- AFL Queensland Schools Cup

(bronze) Third Place: 2020

==== Junior Female (Years 7-9) ====
- AFL Queensland Schools Cup

(gold) Champions: (2) 2017, 2018

- Brisbane Lions State Cup

(gold) Champions: (2) 2008, 2013
