= Loganlea, Queensland =

Loganlea
- Suburb
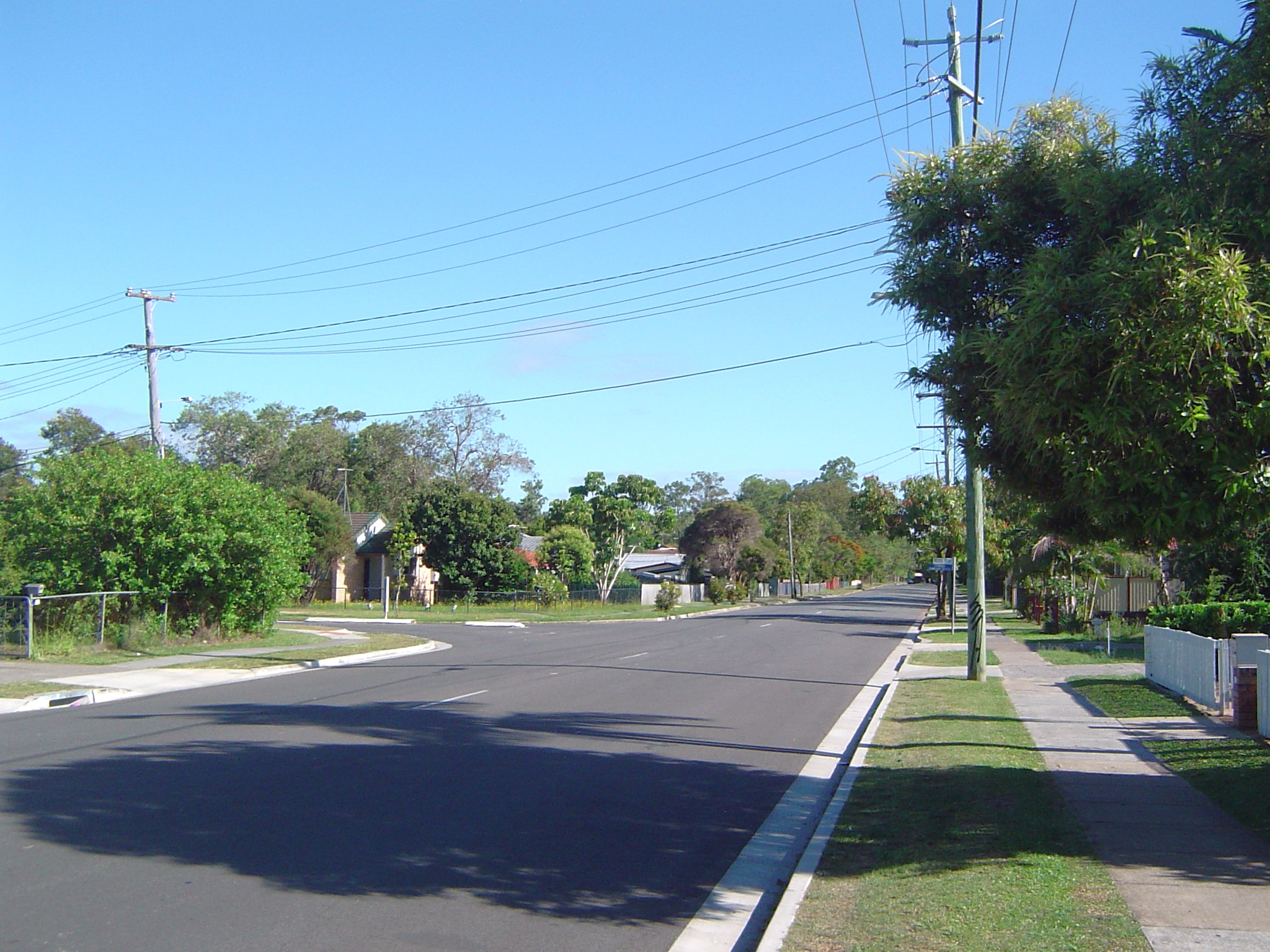
- Haig Road, 2013

- Interactive map of Loganlea
- Coordinates: 27.6752°S 153.1338°E
- Country: Australia
- State: Queensland
- City: Logan City
- LGA: Logan City
- Location: 5.6 km (3.5 mi) SSE of Logan Central; 29.6 km (18.4 mi) S of Brisbane CBD

Government
  - State electorates: Waterford; Woodridge
  - Federal divisions: Forde; Rankin

Area
  - Total: 5.6 km^{2} (2.2 sq mi)

Population
  - Total: 8,716 (2021 census)
  - Density: 1,556/km^{2} (4,030/sq mi)
- Time zone: UTC+10:00 (AEST)
- Postcode: 4131
Suburbs around Loganlea
Kingston	Meadowbrook	Meadowbrook
Kingston	Loganlea	Bethania
Waterford West	Waterford West	Waterford

Loganlea is a suburb in the City of Logan, Queensland, Australia. In the 2021 census, Loganlea had a population of 8,716 people.

== Geography ==
Loganlea is 4 km south-east of Logan Central and 25 km south-east of central Brisbane. The eastern boundary of Loganlea is marked by a winding section of the Logan River. The north of the suburb is aligned with the Beenleigh railway line. The western boundary follows part of both Scrubby Creek and Kingston Road. The Logan Motorway crosses the northern tip of Loganlea where access is provided via Kingston Road. Loganlea is one of three toll points on the road.

Loganlea railway station serves the suburb (27.6707°S 153.1380°E).

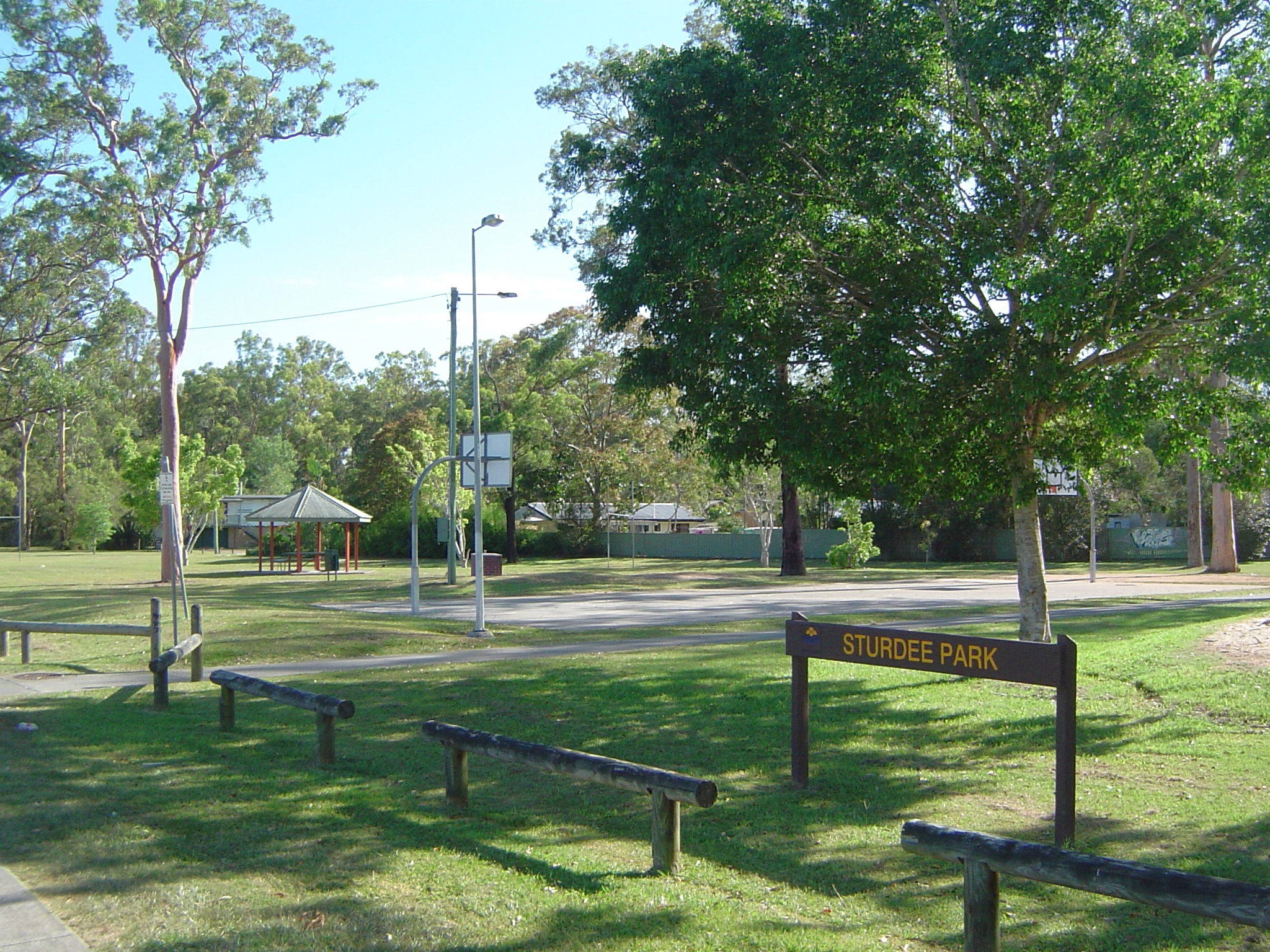
Sturdee Park, 2013

Loganlea State High School was built in the north-east close to the railway line. A police beat is located on the corner of Haig Road and Station Street. Towards the centre of the suburb is a small retail zone which includes a child-care centre. The Logan Artists Association art gallery and studio opened in 2012 and is located in Coral Street. In the east along Logan River the land is prone to flooding. Flooding is experienced at Loganlea Road near Webb Road when the Logan River breaks its banks. Evergreen Park and Sturdee Park are two large parks amongst many smaller others.

There are power transmission lines along Scrubby Creek connected to the Loganlea Substation nearby in Meadowbrook. The suburb is very close to Logan Hospital, TAFE college and Griffith University in Meadowbrook and shopping centres in both Marsden and Waterford West.

Housing in the suburb is mix of aged care facilities, newer high-density housing, average sized blocks with detached houses and houses on established, larger blocks

== History ==
What is now Loganlea is much smaller than the original area between Slacks Creek and Waterford.

In 1864, flooding of the Logan River led to several casualties.

In 1871, the first post office in the area was opened in what is today part of Waterford West. A hotel and Cobb and Co stop were established in the vicinity.

By 1876 there was a crossing of the Logan River to Waterford.

Like a number of other Logan City suburbs Loganlea was once part of the Shire of Tingalpa.

The Loganlea railway station opened in April 1885 for the South Coast railway line. Later in the same year the bridge across the Logan River was opened.

The Loganlea area was the home to dairy stud farms during the mid-20th century. Successive members of the Armstrong family ran the dairy farm Riverdale until the 1970s.

Initial housing developments occurred in the 1970s and 80s.

Loganlea State High School opened on 27 January 1981.

In October 1987, Russell Hinze attended a ceremony at Loganlea for the turning of the first sod in the construction of the Logan Motorway.

Meadowbrook was detached from the former dairy farming community of Loganlea in 1991.

Like many central Logan suburbs Loganlea is experiencing significant population growth. Between 2006 and 2011 the population grew by 16.6%.

== Demographics ==
In the 2011 census, Loganlea recorded a population of 6,172 people, 51.4% female and 48.6% male. The median age of the Loganlea population was 30 years, 7 years below the national median of 37. 66.2% of people living in Loganlea were born in Australia. The other top responses for country of birth were New Zealand 8.2%, England 3.1%, Philippines 1%, Fiji 1%, Kiribati 0.9%. 78.9% of people spoke only English at home; the next most common languages were 1.6% Samoan, 1.2% Khmer, 1.2% Hindi, 1% Gilbertese, 0.7% Spanish. Aboriginal and Torres Strait Islander people were 5.8% of the population, more than double the national average of 2.5%. A greater proportion of families were composed of one parent at 28.1%, almost double the national rate of 15.9%. The majority of dwellings in Loganlea were detached or separated houses.

In the 2016 census, Loganlea had a population of 7,321 people, 49.9% female and 50.1% male. The median age of the Loganlea population was 30 years, 8 years below the national median of 38. 57.3% of people living in Loganlea were born in Australia. The other top responses for country of birth were New Zealand 9.0%, England 2.4%, India 2.2%, Philippines 1.3%, and Afghanistan 1.2%. 68.6% of people spoke only English at home; the next most common languages were 2.3% Arabic, 1.7% Samoan, 1.4% Punjabi, 1.0% Hindi, and 0.9% Dari.

In the 2021 census, Loganlea had a population of 8,716 people, 51.8% female and 48.2% male. The median age of the Loganlea population was 31 years, 7 years below the national median of 38. 54.1% of people living in Loganlea were born in Australia. The other top responses for country of birth were New Zealand 7.7%, Afghanistan 2.8%, Iraq 2.3%, India 2.1%, and England 1.9%. 60.9% of people spoke only English at home; the next most common languages were 3.9% Arabic, 2.5% Hazaraghi, 2.2% Samoan, 1.7% Punjabi, and 1.1% Dari.

== Education ==
Loganlea State High School is a government secondary (7–12) school for boys and girls at Neridah Street (27.6737°S 153.1423°E). In 2017, the school had an enrolment of 619 students with 72 teachers (65 full-time equivalent) and 53 non-teaching staff (37 full-time equivalent). In 2023, the school had an enrolment of 817 students with 78 teachers (74 full-time equivalent) and 62 non-teaching staff (49 full-time equivalent). It includes a special education program.

There are no primary schools in Loganlea. The nearest government primary schools are Waterford West State School in neighbouring Waterford West to the south and Kingston State School in neighbouring Kingston to the north-west.

== Transport ==
Loganlea railway station provides access to regular Queensland Rail Citytrain network services to Brisbane, Beenleigh and Gold Coast. Loganlea Road and Station Road are two arterial roads in Loganlea. Haig Road, Station Road and Monash Road are the suburb's main connecting roads. A road overpass for the Beenleigh rail line was built just south of the railway station. Street parking in some areas near the railway station is limited two hours.

The station is one two stops in the Logan City area serviced by the Gold Coast railway line. These partial express service trains arrive in the city in around 30 minutes in the off peak period. Logan Bus Service operates a number of services, including late at night, through more than a dozen bus stops throughout the suburb. They also operate a bus depot in Jutland Street.

The Slacks Creek Cycle Way passes adjacent to Loganlea Road across the suburb. The East West route cycleway to Kingston and Marsden winds around Scrubby Creek close to the suburb's northern boundary.
