= Bethania, Queensland =

Bethania
- Suburb
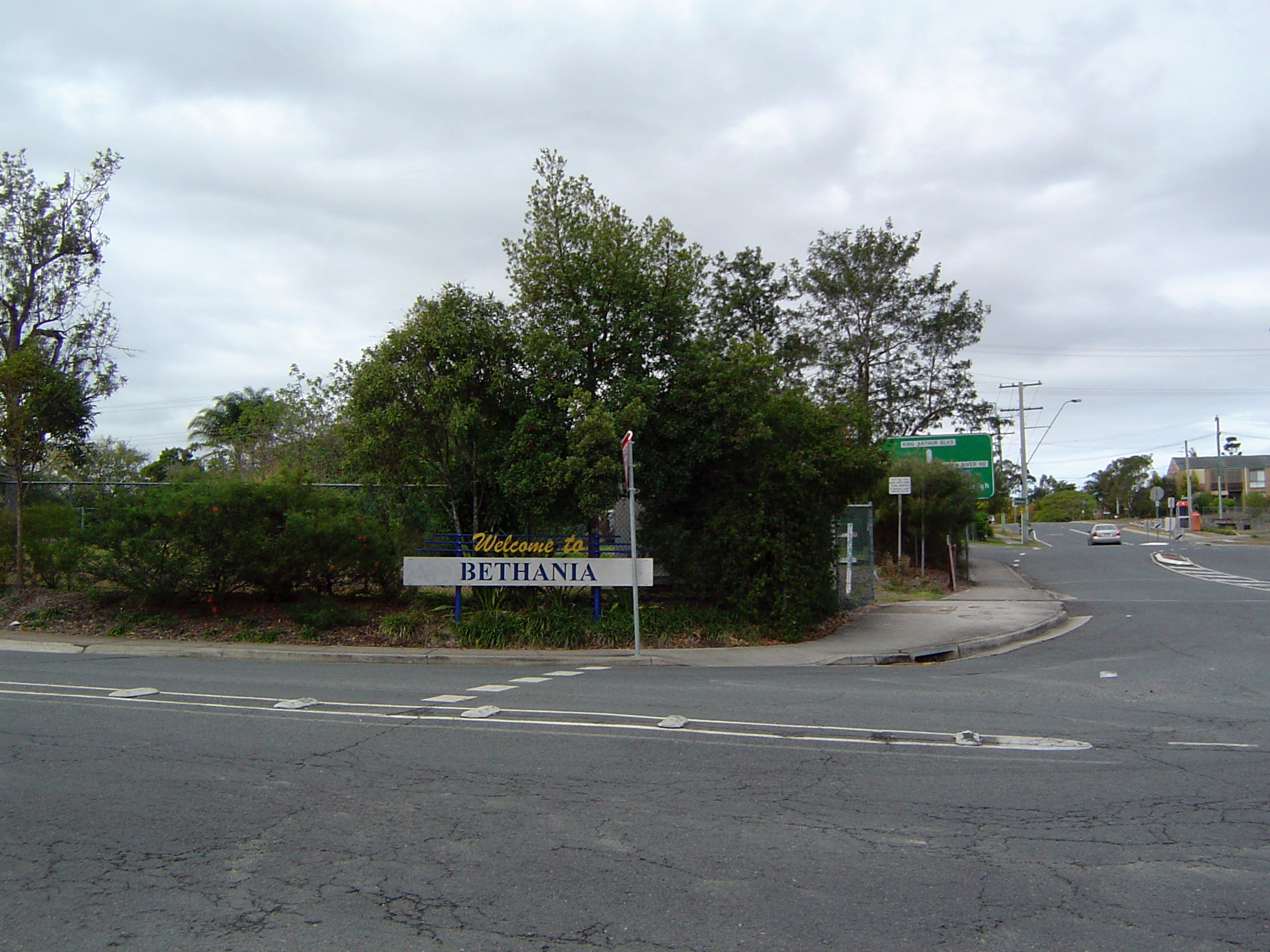
- Albert Street, 2014

- Interactive map of Bethania
- Coordinates: 27.6869°S 153.1575°E
- Country: Australia
- State: Queensland
- City: Logan City
- LGA: Logan City
- Location: 10.5 km (6.5 mi) SE of Logan Central; 33.2 km (20.6 mi) SSE of Brisbane CBD

Government
  - State electorate: Waterford
  - Federal division: Forde

Area
  - Total: 5.8 km^{2} (2.2 sq mi)
- Elevation: 15 m (49 ft)

Population
  - Total: 6,333 (2021 census)
  - Density: 1,092/km^{2} (2,828/sq mi)
- Time zone: UTC+10:00 (AEST)
- Postcode: 4205
Suburbs around Bethania
Loganlea	Meadowbrook	Tanah Merah
Loganlea	Bethania	Loganholme
Waterford West	Waterford	Edens Landing

Bethania (/bɛθɑːniə/) is a suburb in the City of Logan, Queensland, Australia. In the 2021 census, Bethania had a population of 6,333 people. The suburb experiences heavy impacts from river flooding.

== Geography ==
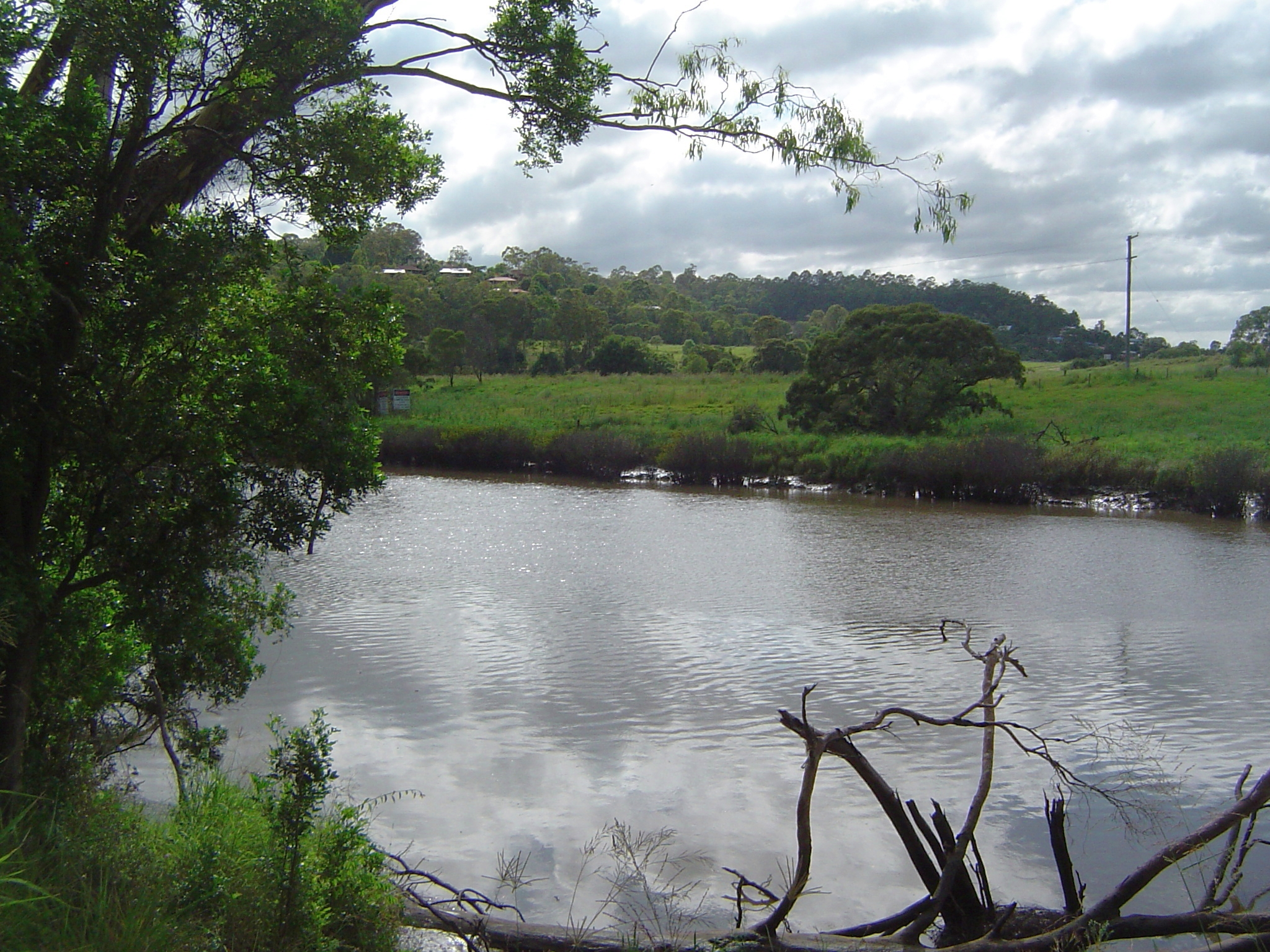
The Logan River and lower grazing lands prone to floods seen from Meadowbrook, 2013

Bethania lies south of the Logan River. The lower lying areas near the river occasionally suffer floods.

Bethania is situated on the main Beenleigh railway line and the suburb is served by Bethania railway station (27.6889°S 153.1592°E).

Beaudesert railway line branches from the South Coast railway line just south of the Bethania railway station at (27.6901°S 153.1600°E) and runs to Beaudesert. It has been out of commission since August 2004.

== History ==
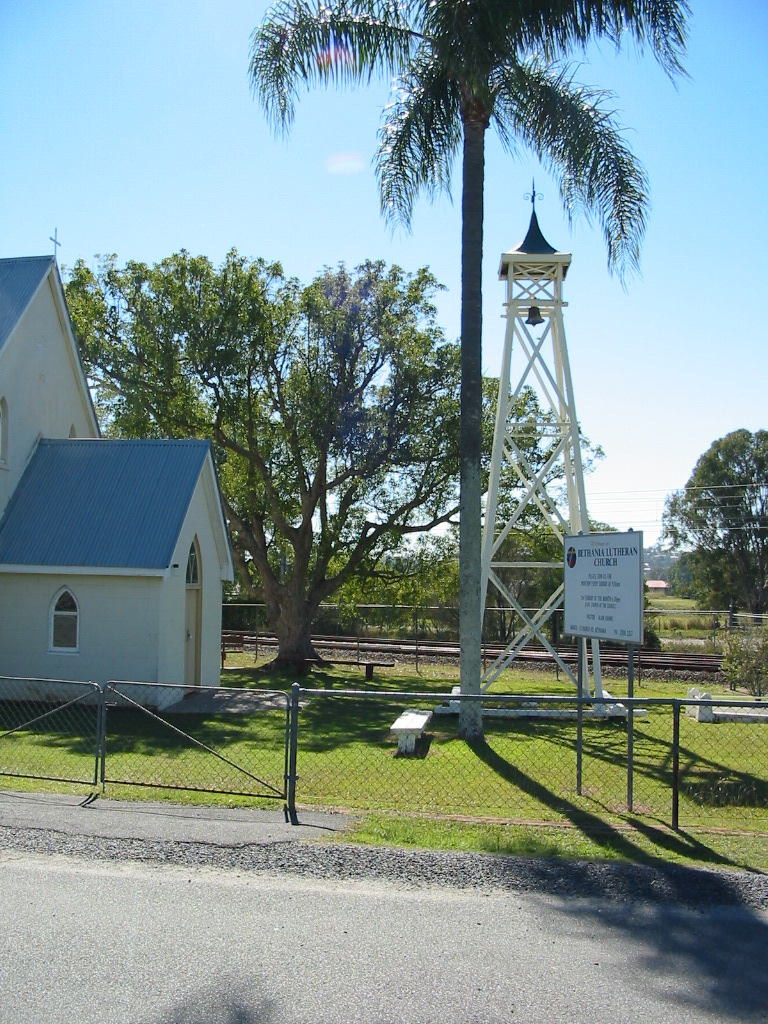
Bethania Lutheran Church and bell tower, 2005

Bethania was founded by Germans during the 1860s and is home to many nationalities. By 1866 a small township had developed. It is believed the name is derived from Bethany, the biblical village in Israel.

A Lutheran church was built in 1864 made from slabs on what is now the railway line. A cemetery was established beside the church with graves from 1866. In 1872 the present church was built close to the first church (27.691361°S 153.161392°E). The road to the church became known as Church Road.

The first railway bridge was destroyed by flood in 1887. A new concrete, steel and timber bridge lasted until 1972 when it was replaced by a pre-stressed concrete bridge.

The suburb was affected badly by the 1974 Brisbane flood. Duck Island became part of the suburb when part of the river was silted up. Sand and gravel has been mined from the alluvial deposits in recent years.

Bethania Lutheran Primary School opened on 27 January 1976.

== Demographics ==
In the 2011 census, Bethania had a population of 4,590 people, 53.3% female and 46.7% male. The median age of the Bethania population was 41 years, 4 years above the national median of 37. 68.7% of the people living in Bethania were born in Australia. The other top responses for country of birth were England 6.6%, New Zealand 6%, Scotland 1.4%, Philippines 0.9% and Germany 0.9%. 86.9% of the people spoke only English at home; the next most common languages were 0.8% Spanish, 0.5% German, 0.5% Hindi, 0.4% Tagalog, 0.3% Samoan.

In the 2016 census, Bethania had a population of 5,385 people, 53.5% female and 46.5% male. The median age of the Bethania population was 47 years, 9 years above the national median of 38. 66.7% of the people living in Bethania were born in Australia. The other top responses for country of birth were England 6.8%, New Zealand 6.3%, Scotland 1.4%, Philippines 1.3%, and China (excludes SARs and Taiwan) 1.2%. 86.9% of the people spoke only English at home; the next most common languages were 1.0% Mandarin, 0.9% Cantonese, 0.8% Spanish, 0.4% German, and 0.4% Samoan.

In the 2021 census, Bethania had a population of 6,333 people, 55.3% female and 44.7% male. The median age of the Bethania population was 48 years, 10 years above the national median of 38. 65.5% of the people living in Bethania were born in Australia. The other top responses for country of birth were New Zealand 7.6%, England 6.0%, Philippines 1.0%, China (excludes SARs and Taiwan) 1.0%, and Scotland 0.9%. 82.1% of the people spoke only English at home; the next most common languages were 1.1% Mandarin, 0.6% Samoan, 0.6% Spanish, 0.5% Cantonese, and 0.5% Hindi.

== Heritage listing ==
Bethania has a number of heritage-listed sites, including:

- Bethania Lutheran Church, Church Road (27.6912°S 153.1609°E)

== Education ==
Bethania Lutheran Primary School is a private primary (Prep–6) school for boys and girls at 66 Glastonbury Drive (27.6943°S 153.1578°E). In 2018, the school had an enrolment of 287 students with 25 teachers (21 full-time equivalent) and 16 non-teaching staff (11 full-time equivalent). In 2023, the school had an enrolment of 328 students with 21 teachers (18 full-time equivalent) and 25 non-teaching staff (17 full-time equivalent).

There are no government schools in Bethania. The nearest government primary schools are Waterford State School in neighbouring Waterford to the south and Edens Landing State School in neighbouring Edens Landing to the south-east. The nearest government secondary school is Loganlea State High School in neighbouring Loganlea to the north-west.

== Amenities ==
Palm Lake Christian Fellowship conduct their services at the Palm Lake Resort at 43 Goodooga Drive; it is part of the Wesleyan Methodist Church.

== Transport ==
Bethania railway station provides access to regular Queensland Rail City network services to Brisbane and Beenleigh.
