= Metro South Health =

Metro South Health is the provider of public health care in the Brisbane south side, Logan City, Redland City and Scenic Rim Region.

It has more than 13,000 employees and provides specialist health care to 23% of the Queensland population. Dr Stephen Ayre is the Chief Executive. Cameron Ballantine is the Chief Information Officer.

It runs 5 hospitals, Princess Alexandra Hospital, Brisbane, Logan Hospital, Queen Elizabeth II Jubilee Hospital, Redland Hospital and Beaudesert Hospital and a network of community health centres.

== Electronic health records ==
Princess Alexandra Hospital is the exemplar site for the implementation of the shared integrated electronic medical record solution for Queensland.
