= Redland Hospital =

Geography
- Location: Redland City, Cleveland, Queensland, Australia
- Coordinates: 27°32′25.12″S 153°15′06.60″E

Organisation
- Type: District General
- Network: Queensland Health

Links
- Website: metrosouth.health.qld.gov.au/redland-hospital
- Lists: Hospitals in Australia

Redland Hospital is a public hospital, located in Redland City, Queensland, Australia. Its address is Weippin Street, Cleveland. The hospital provides emergency, general medical, surgical and obstetric services. Administratively, the hospital is part of the Metro South Health Service District.

Redland Hospital opened on 30 June 1987. As of October 2018, the Hospital employs approximately 900 staff operating 172 beds.

In late 2014, it was announced the hospital would receive $3 million in funding for various upgrades and maintenance.

The 60-bed Mater Private Hospital Redland, the Redland Health Service Centre and Redland Residential Care are also on site.

== Services ==
General hospital services available here include acute medical, surgical, emergency services, mental health, rehabilitation, women & birthing, orthopaedics and pediatrics. Allied health services include medical imaging, physiotherapy, speech pathology, podiatry, occupational therapy and social work.

The hospital also provides specialist services including dermatology, gynaecology, pediatrics, cardiology, endocrinology, medicine, urology, respiratory, gastroenterology and neurology.

An expansion of the hospital is currently under development (as of 2022) which will include a new intensive care unit, additional beds, and refurbishment of existing areas.

=== Clinical Support Services ===
Anaesthetics, Pharmacy, Pathology, Diagnostic Radiology/Medical Imaging.

=== Integrated Community and Hospital Services ===
Mental Health, Family Health Protection Services, Drug and Alcohol Services, Geriatrics/Aged Care, Health Promotion, HIV/AIDS, Palliative Care, Rehabilitation, Sexual Assault Services, Indigenous Health Services, Women's Health and Oral Health, Breastscreening, Redland Residential Care.

== See also ==
- List of hospitals in Australia
