= Loganlea railway station =

Railway station in Queensland, Australia

Loganlea
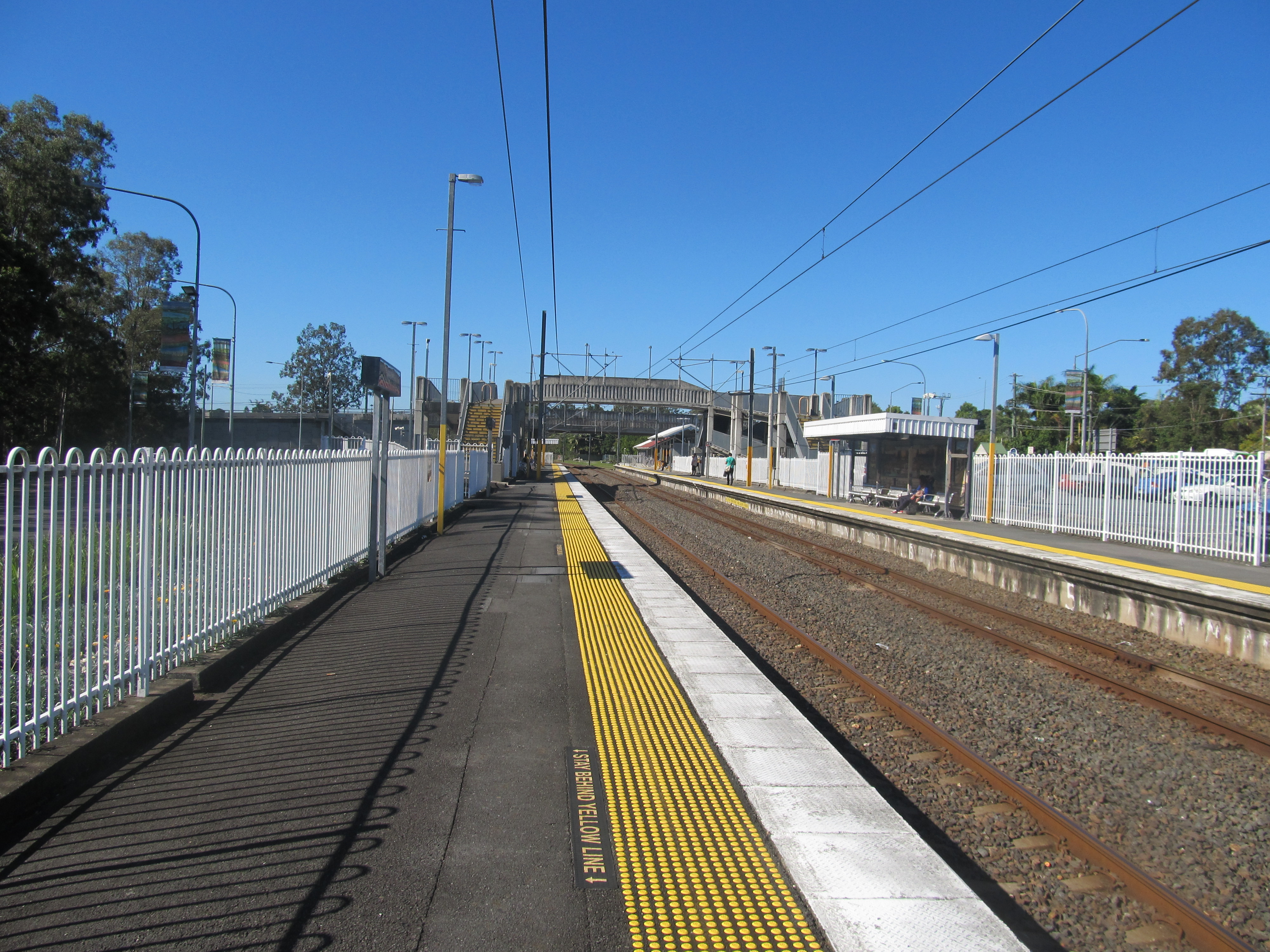
- Southbound view from Platform 1 in July 2012

General information
- Location: Station Road, Loganlea
- Coordinates: 27°40′15″S 153°08′16″E
- Owner: Queensland Rail
- Operator: Queensland Rail
- Lines: T6 Beenleigh; T5 Varsity Lakes
- Distance: 32.21 kilometres from Central
- Platforms: 2 side
- Tracks: 2

Construction
- Structure type: Ground
- Parking: 143 bays
- Cycle facilities: Yes

Other information
- Status: Staffed
- Station code: 600230 (platform 1); 600231 (platform 2)
- Fare zone: Zone 3
- Website: Queensland Rail

History
- Opened: 7 April 1885; 141 years ago

Services
Preceding station	Queensland Rail	Following station
Kingston towards Ferny Grove	Beenleigh line	Bethania towards Beenleigh
Altandi towards Domestic Airport	Varsity Lakes line	Beenleigh towards Varsity Lakes
Location

Loganlea is a railway station operated by Queensland Rail on the Beenleigh and Varsity Lakes lines. It opened in 1885 and serves the Logan suburb of Loganlea. It is a ground level station, featuring two side platform.

== History ==
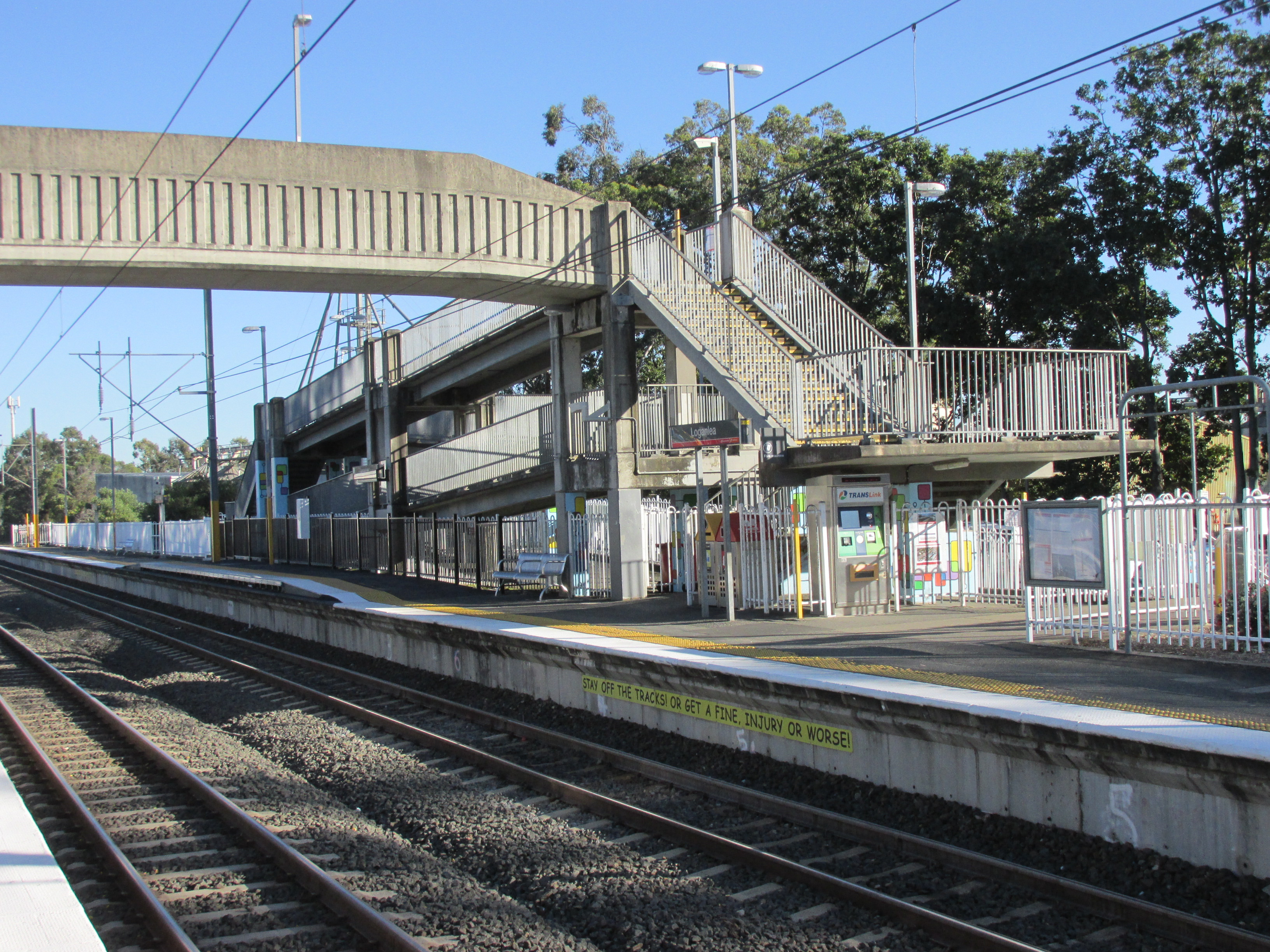
Southbound platform, 2018

The station opened in 1885 at the same time as the line. In the past it was used to load freight for the distribution of timber and local produce. It also once had a goods shed. The station was severely damaged by a cyclone in 1936. For some time trains of eight or nine carriages were stopping at Loganlea, even though its platform length could only cover two or three carriages. On 21 April 1992, a second platform opened as part of the duplication of the line. In December 2019, the Queensland Government announced the station's relocation, which will make it adjacent to Logan Hospital, expected to be completed before the 2032 Brisbane Olympics.

== Services ==
Loganlea is served by all stops Beenleigh line services from Beenleigh to Bowen Hills and Ferny Grove. It is also served by limited stops Gold Coast line services from Varsity Lakes to Bowen Hills, Doomben and Brisbane Airport.

== Platforms and services ==
Loganlea platform arrangement
Platform	Line	Destination	Notes
1	T6 Beenleigh	Beenleigh	
1	T5 Varsity Lakes	Varsity Lakes	
2	T6 Beenleigh	Roma Street (to Ferny Grove line	
2	T5 Varsity Lakes	Roma Street (to Airport line)	

== Transport links ==
Logan City Bus Service operate two bus routes via Loganlea station:

- 560: Loganholme to Browns Plains
- 562: Loganholme to Beenleigh station
