= Bethania railway station =

Railway station in Queensland, Australia

Bethania
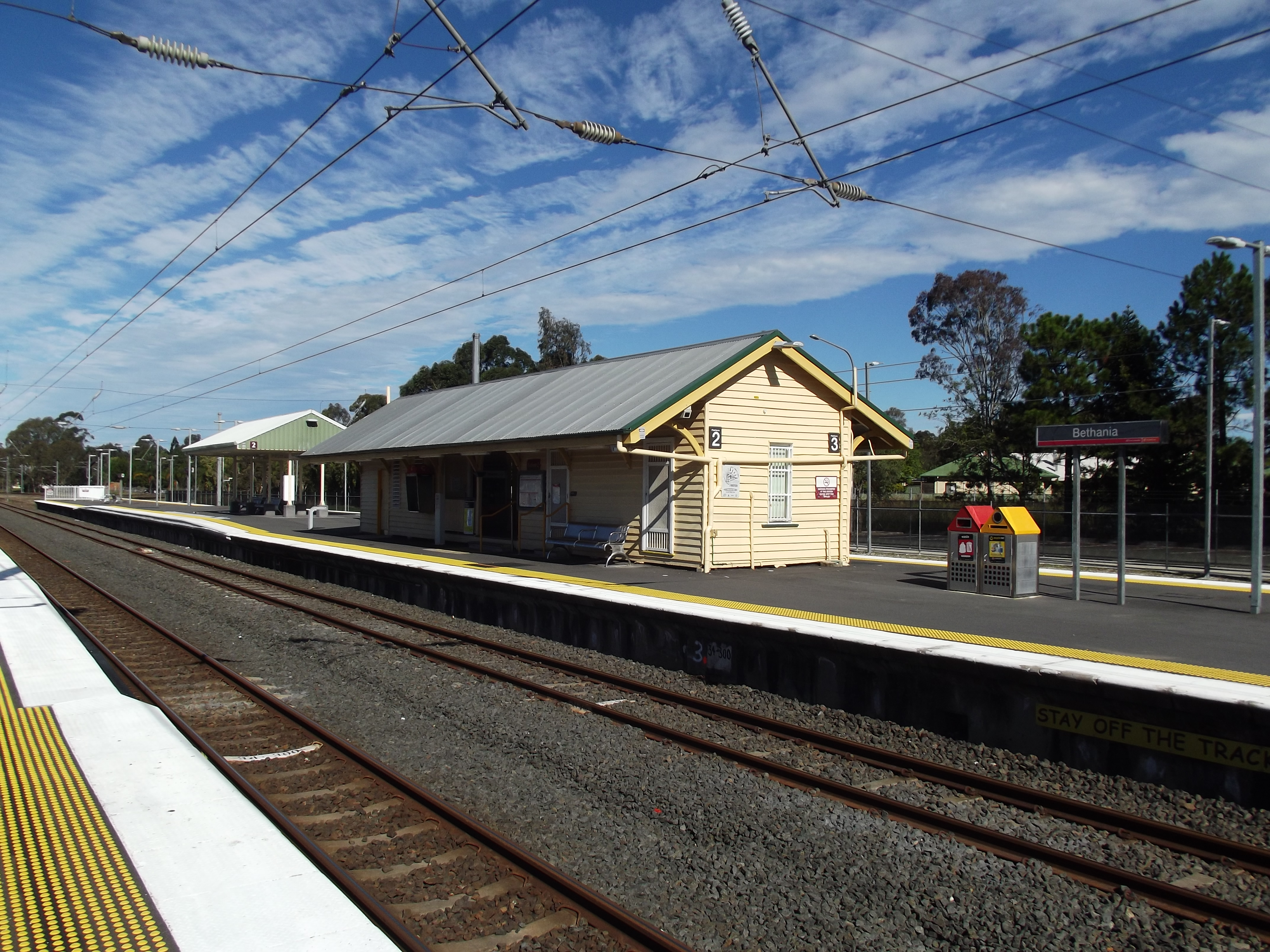
- Southbound view from Platform 1, July 2012

General information
- Location: Station Road, Bethania
- Coordinates: 27.6884°S 153.1585°E
- Owner: Queensland Rail
- Operator: Queensland Rail
- Line: T6 Beenleigh
- Distance: 35.19 kilometres from Central
- Platforms: 3 (1 side, 1 island)
- Tracks: 3

Construction
- Structure type: Ground
- Parking: 89 bays
- Cycle facilities: Yes

Other information
- Status: Staffed part time
- Station code: 600232 (platform 1); 600233 (platform 2); 600234 (platform 3)
- Fare zone: Zone 3
- Website: Translink

History
- Opened: July 1885; 141 years ago
- Former names: Kara Kara; Bethania Junction

Services
Preceding station	Queensland Rail	Following station
Loganlea towards Ferny Grove via Roma Street	T6 Beenleigh line	Eden's Landing towards Beenleigh
Location

Bethania is a railway station operated by Queensland Rail on the Beenleigh line. It opened in 1885 and serves the Logan suburb of Bethania. It is a ground level station, featuring one island platform with two faces, and one side platform.

== History ==
Bethania station opened in July 1885 as Kara Kara. In September that year, it became a junction station when the Beaudesert railway line opened and was renamed Bethania Junction. The “Junction” suffix was dropped in 1943. Refreshment rooms opened in 1908 and closed in 1964. On 21 April 1992, a third platform opened as part of the duplication of the line. As part of the Logan and Gold Coast Faster Rail project, the station will receive level crossing removals.

== Services ==
Bethania station is served by all stops Beenleigh line services from Beenleigh to Bowen Hills and Ferny Grove.

== Platforms and services ==
Bethania platform arrangement
Platform	Line	Destination	Notes
1	T6 Beenleigh	Beenleigh	
2	T6 Beenleigh	Roma Street (to Ferny Grove line)	
3	T6 Beenleigh	Roma Street (to Ferny Grove line)	Two morning peak services only
