= Logan City =

City in Queensland, Australia

Coordinates: 27°38′21″S 153°06′34″E

City of Logan
- Local government area
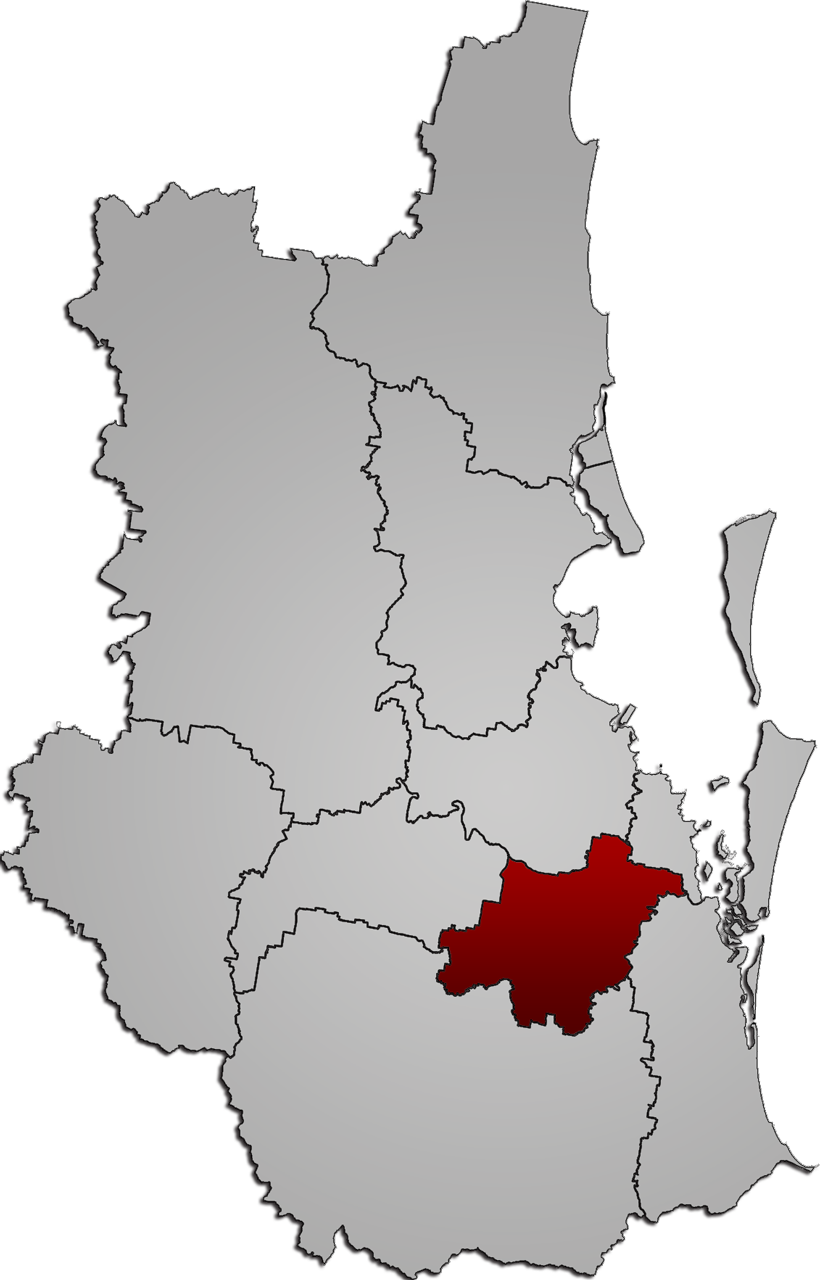
- Location within South East Queensland

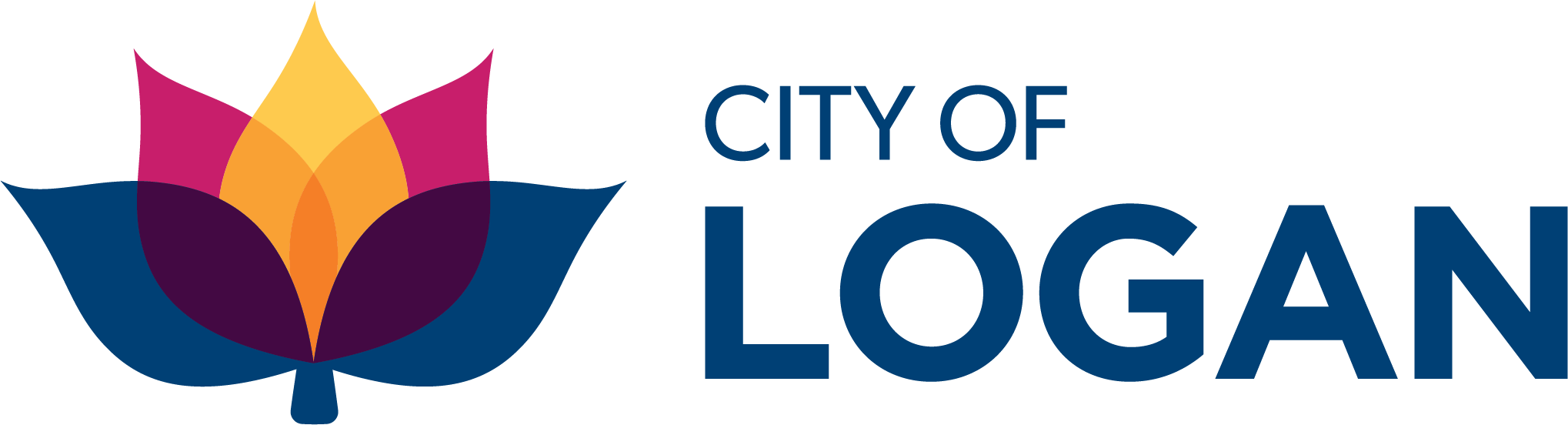
- Interactive map of City of Logan
- Country: Australia
- State: Queensland
- Region: South East Queensland
- Established: 1978
- Council seat: Logan Central

Government
  - Mayor: Jon Raven
  - State electorate: Algester*, Jordan, Logan, Macalister, Scenic Rim*, Springwood*, Stretton*, Waterford, Woodridge
  - Federal division: Rankin, Forde, Wright

Area
  - Total: 958 km^{2} (370 sq mi)

Population
  - Total: 345,098 (2021 census) (7th)
  - Density: 360.23/km^{2} (933.0/sq mi)
- Website: City of Logan
LGAs around City of Logan
City of Brisbane	City of Brisbane	City of Redland
City of Ipswich	City of Logan	City of Redland
Scenic Rim	Scenic Rim	City of Gold Coast

The City of Logan is a local government area (LGA) located in the south of Greater Brisbane in South East Queensland (SEQ), Australia. Situated between the City of Brisbane to the north and the City of Gold Coast to the south, the City of Logan also borders the Scenic Rim Region, the City of Ipswich, and Redland City LGAs. Logan is divided into 70 suburbs and 12 divisions; a councillor is elected to each of the latter. The council had a population of 326,615 as of June 2018.

Gaining significant area in 2008 from the amalgamation of parts of the Albert and Beaudesert Shires, the City of Logan extends north to Priestdale, south to Mundoolun near the Albert River, east to Carbrook at the Logan River, and west to Lyons. Logan is located across parts of the sub-basin of Oxley Creek, and the Logan and Albert Rivers. The Daisy Hill Koala Centre serves as an example of Logan's prominent bushland, reminiscent of Karawatha Forest, and the Tamborine and Venman Bushland National Parks, that border Logan suburbs.

The region is named after Captain Patrick Logan, as is the aforementioned river, alongside the commercial hubs of Logan Central, Shailer Park's Logan Hyperdome, and Browns Plains. Other populous suburbs include Beenleigh, Rochedale South, Meadowbrook, Springwood, Woodridge, Eagleby and the rural towns of Jimboomba and Logan Village. The city facilitates much of the transport between Brisbane and the Gold Coast. Its motorway network is extensive: in the city's north-east, the Logan Motorway joins the Pacific Motorway, while the Mount Lindesay Highway and Sydney–Brisbane rail corridor cross the city along a roughly central north-south axis. New developments are common, particularly those being built at Yarrabilba and Greater Flagstone, while Griffith University has already established a Logan campus in Meadowbrook which is being developed into a specialist area based around health, research and education.

In 2016, Luke Smith was elected mayor of Logan. On 2 May 2019, Minister for Local Government Stirling Hinchliffe sacked the Logan City Council after eight of its Councillors and suspended mayor were charged with one count of fraud. The suspended Mayor was also charged with two counts of misconduct. The council was under administration until March 2020 elections.

In the 2021 census, the City of Logan had a population of 345,098 people.

== History ==
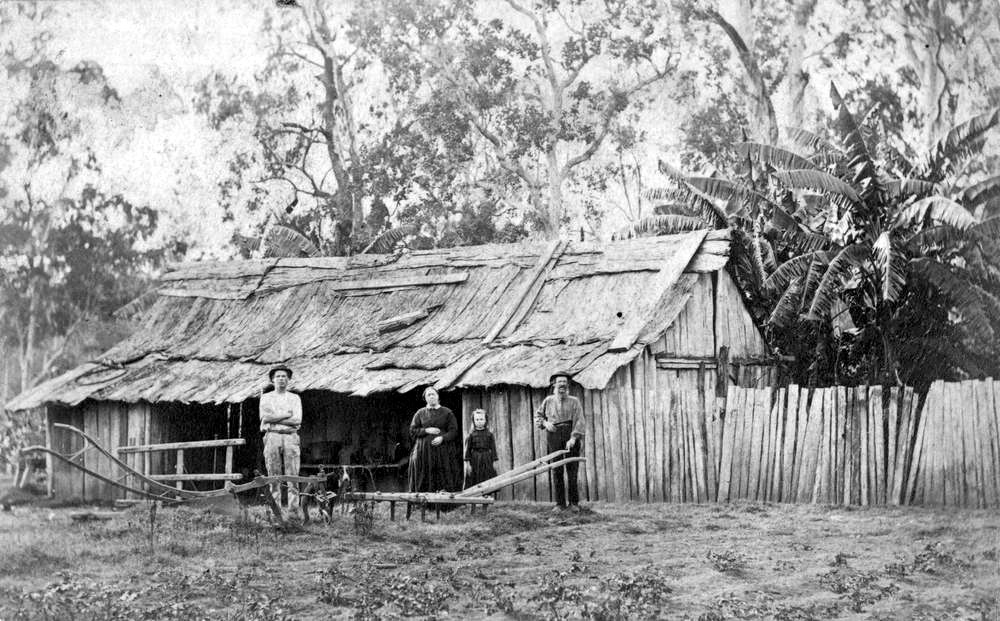
Bark dwelling at Logan Village

Yugembah (also known as Yugumbir, Jugambel, Jugambeir, Jugumbir, Jukam, Jukamba) is an Australian Aboriginal languages of South East Queensland. The Yugembah language areas include Gold Coast, Logan, Scenic Rim, Tweed River Valley, Albert River, Beaudesert, Beenleigh, Coolangatta, Coomera, Logan River, Pimpama and Tamborine, within the local government boundaries of the City of Gold Coast, City of Logan, Scenic Rim Regional Council and the Tweed River Valley.

The Commandant of the Moreton Bay Penal Settlement, Captain Patrick Logan, was a compulsive explorer and in 1826 on his first expedition he discovered the Logan River. He noted the river was well suited to large-vessel traffic and was a first-class avenue to access the high-quality arable land along its banks. He named the country Darling, in honour of the Governor. The Governor renamed the river after Logan. One of the first large employers was the timber industry. The Logan River served as a rafting ground for logs and the new railways spurred local demand.

The penal settlement based in Brisbane was closed in 1841 and the land was quickly taken up by squatters. The first leases of land in the Logan area were issued from 1849 and immigration was encouraged following the separation from NSW in 1859. The declaration of the Logan and Eight Mile Plains Agricultural Reserves in 1862 led to extensive settlement of the area. German immigrants arrived in batches from the 1864 onwards. Generous land orders for immigrants in Queensland created a drawcard in the possibility of owning their own farm.

A cotton gin, which was converted to a sugar mill, was built at Loganholme in 1867. Cotton growers faced problems with both the weather and a lack of available labour despite the introduction of Kanaka labour. By the 1870s few working cotton plantations remained along the Logan River. While this crop was marginally successful, between 1866 and 1874, sugar was soon to become the staple industry.

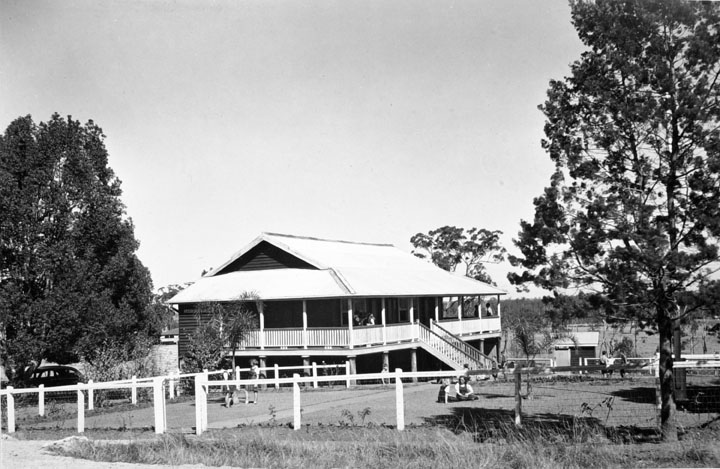
Slacks Creek State School, 1946

Many small sugar mills were started by farmers seeking to avoid processing costs charged by big mills. However these quickly proved to be uneconomic. Many farmers in the area abandoned sugar after a severe frost in 1885 and a catastrophic flood in 1887 which saw crops destroyed and covered with metres of silt. Others continued growing sugar cane to make 1890 one of the best harvests ever. In 1888, the railway opened in Logan. Within a year, Cobb and Co services ended in Logan.

Significant flooding occurred in Logan during the 1974 Brisbane flood. The Wild Water Water Slide Park began operations in October 1982. The site was to become the Logan Hyperdome with the first work on the regional shopping centre beginning in October 1988. It was officially opened in July 1989. Construction work on the Logan Hospital started in February 1989. In August 2011, the Logan suburb of Slacks Creek was the location for Queensland's worst house fire.

In 2017, a water treatment plant at Round Mountain became the first in Australia to be powered entirely off-grid.

=== Establishment of Logan ===
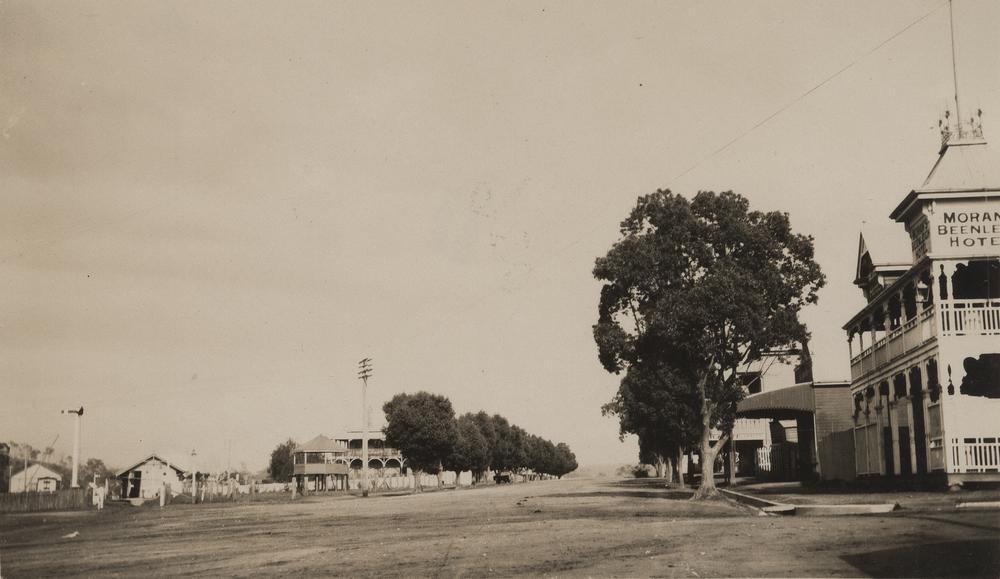
The main street in Beenleigh in 1908 which was until 1948 in the former Shire of Beenleigh

The Department of Local Government instigated the formation of the new Logan Shire, which included the northern suburbs of both Albert and Beaudesert Shires. A section in the north previously belonged to the Shire of Tingalpa. There were about 69,000 people living to the north of the Logan River. On 31 May 1978, Local Government Minister Russ Hinze introduced the Local Government (Adjustment of Boundaries) Bill and which was officially approved on 8 June 1978. Logan then was declared a city on 1 January 1981 and the administration building on Wembley Road was opened in February 1981.

The city was named after Captain Patrick Logan, one of the founders of the Moreton Bay convict settlement. Logan was honoured in the names of many locales in the district, such as the Logan River, the suburbs of Loganlea, Logan Village, Loganholme, Logan Reserve and Logan Central, the Logan Motorway and Logan Road, which connects Logan City with the nearby state capital of Brisbane.

=== Local government changes ===
With the major changes to local government in Queensland which took effect at 15 March 2008 local elections, Logan more than tripled in area and added 78,400 people to its population. This came about through annexing a large section of the now-dissolved Shire of Beaudesert as well as the Beenleigh-Eagleby suburban area to its southeast, which had been part of the Gold Coast. Residents of Beenleigh and Eagleby were asked to vote to join Logan, with an overwhelming "No" vote. Despite this, the amalgamation went ahead. In its rationale for the changes, the Local Government Reform Commission argued that the area added brought the South East Queensland urban footprint and future growth areas to 2026 under the one local government, which could plan effectively for the area's future and would face reduced compliance costs for development works. Economic factors, the lack of geographic barriers and the presence of transport corridors were also considered to be favourable to the annexation. Consideration was given to a merger with Redland to its east, but geographical barriers and the lack of a community of interest between them militated against this.

== Demographics ==
The area is a major regional growth and development corridor with significant population growth expected through to 2041, second only to Brisbane in the state. The city has a higher rate of multicultural diversity than the Queensland average. About one quarter of Logan's residents were born overseas.

In the 2021 census, the Logan City had a population of 345,098 people, 50.6% female and 49.4% male with 4.2% being Indigenous Australian. The median age of Logan City was 34 years old, 4 years below the national median of 38. The most commonly nominated ancestries were English (35.5%), Australian (31.1%), Scottish (8.2%), Irish (8.0%) and German (4.8%). 65.7% of people living in Logan City were born in Australia. The other top responses for country of birth were New Zealand (7.1%), England (3.3%), India (1.6%), Philippines (1.1%) and Samoa (0.7%). 75.1% of people spoke only English at home; the next most common languages were Samoan (1.3%), Punjabi (1.2%), Mandarin (1.1%), Arabic (0.8%) and Hindi (0.7%). The most common religious affiliations reported were none (40.3%), Catholic (14.8%), Anglican (9.3%) and Christian (4.3%).

== Governance ==
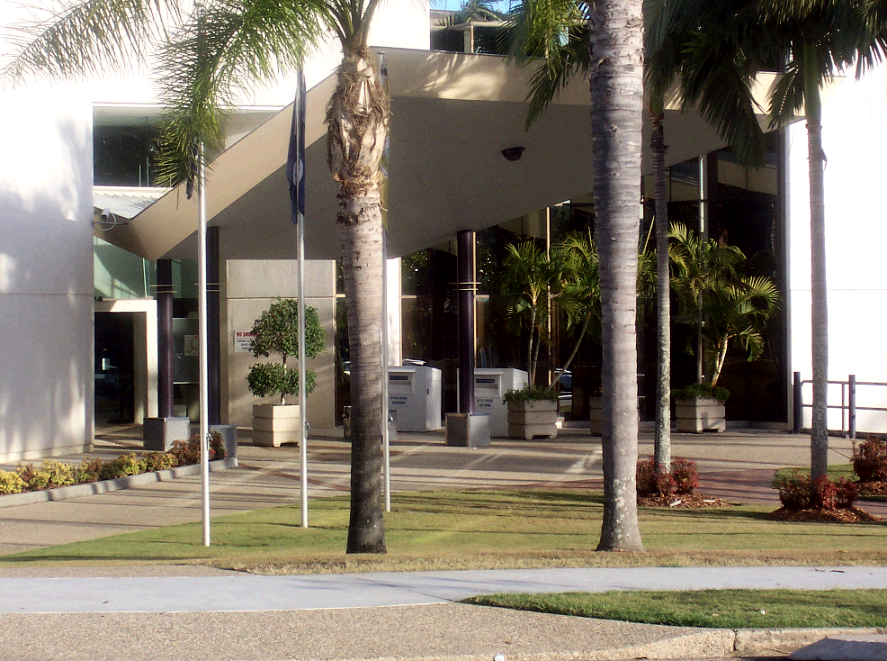
Logan City Council offices and library, 2006

At the federal level, the majority of the city's population is represented by the electorate of Rankin. First proclaimed in 1984, Rankin has elected a member of the Labor Party at every election since inception. The newer parts of Logan are within Forde, while Moreton and Oxley contain small portions of Logan City closer to Brisbane. The Division of Wright, created in 2010, contains many of the rural areas in the southern part of the city.

Logan City council

Leadership
- Jon Raven, Independent Labor

Structure
- Political groups: Independent ALP (4) Independent (9)

=== Council ===
Logan City Council is divided and consists of 12 councillors and a popularly elected mayor. Councillors are not officially endorsed by political parties, but are required to declare current memberships of political parties, bodies, associations and trade or professional organisations.

Councillor	Declared political membership	Term	Constituency
Jon Raven	ALP	2024–current	Mayor
Lisa Bradley	Independent	2008–2019, 2020–current	Division 1
Teresa Lane	ALP	2020–current	Division 2
Melinda Russell	ALP	2020–current	Division 3
Nathan St Ledger	Independent	2024–current	Division 4
Paul Jackson	Independent	2024–current	Division 5
Anthony Hall	Independent	2020–current	Division 6
Timothy Frazer	ALP	2020–current	Division 7
Jacob Heremaia	Independent	2020–current	Division 8
Scott Bannan	Independent	2020–current	Division 9
Miriam Stemp	Independent	2020–current	Division 10
Natalie Willcocks	Independent	2020–current	Division 11
Karen Murphy	Independent	2020–current	Division 12

The council administers local infrastructure including 6 public pools, more than 900 parks, 7 cemeteries and a waste treatment plant at Browns Plains that provides gas-powered cogeneration power to about 2,000 homes.

== Education ==
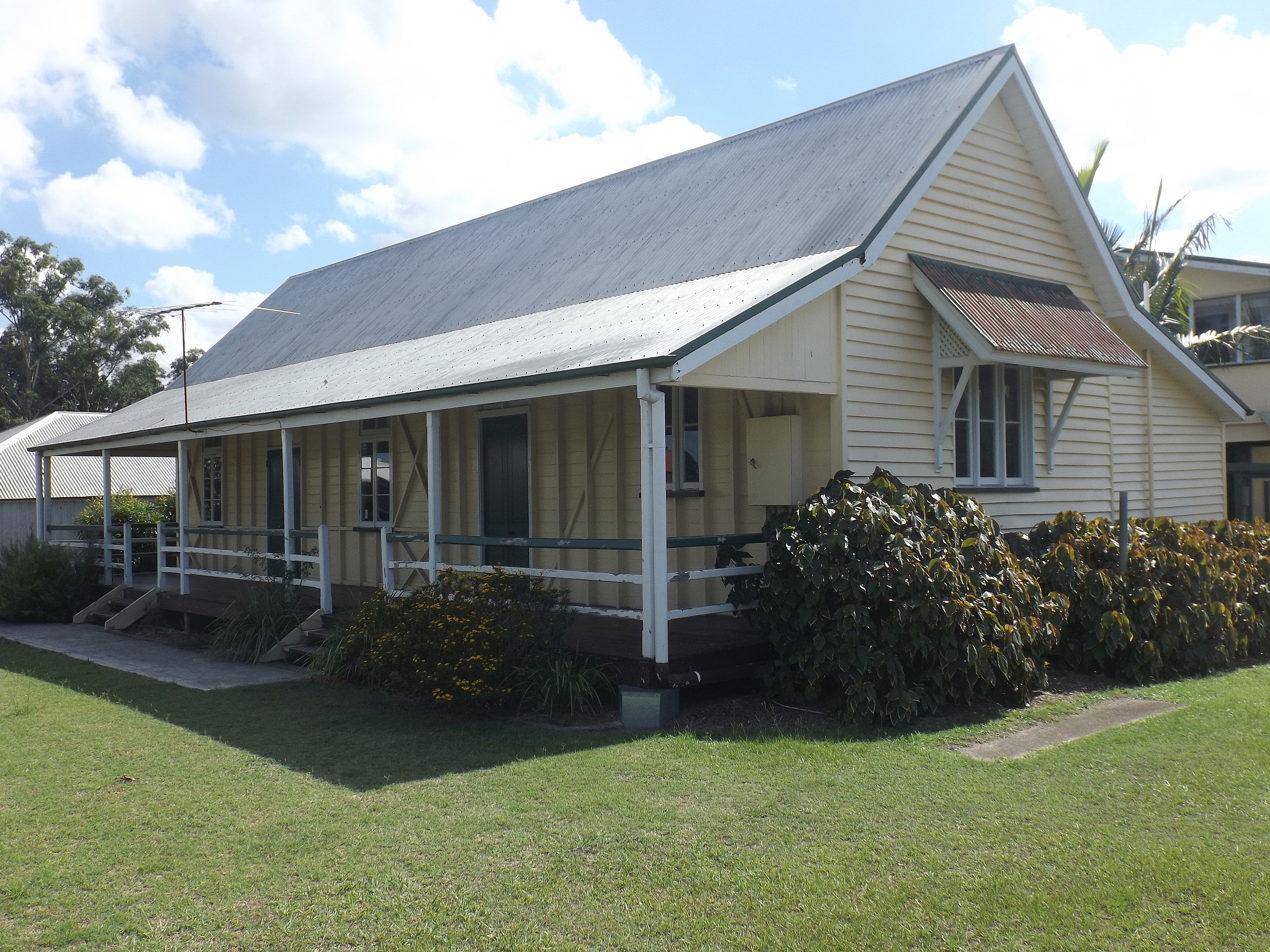
Waterford State School, 2016

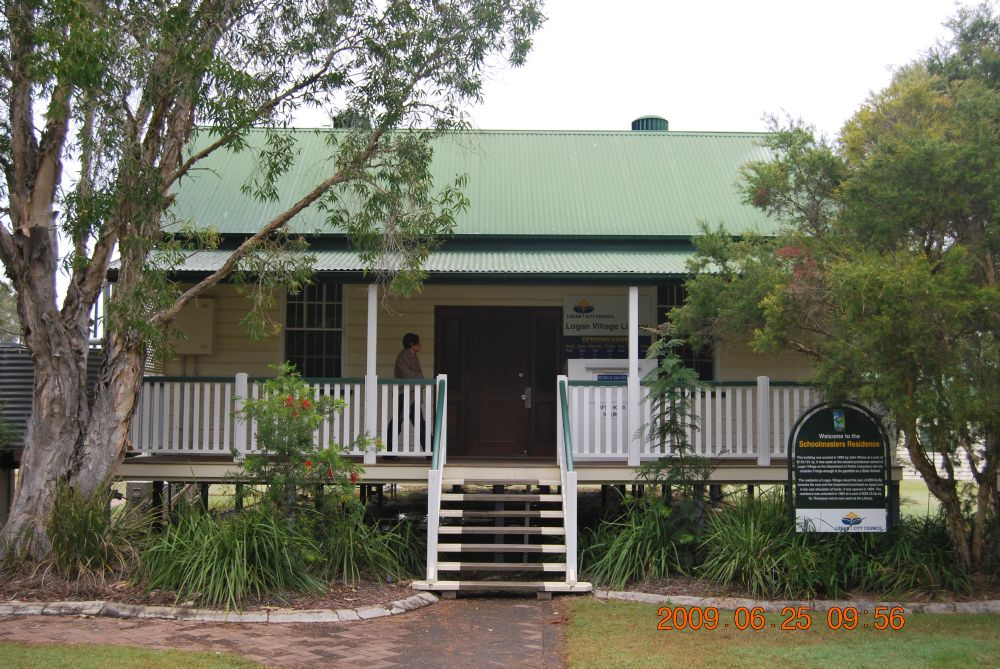
Logan Village State School, 2009

Logan Reserve State School opened on 1 January 1868 and caters for students from Prep to Year 6 School with a C&K Kindy on site. Another of the earliest schools in the area was Waterford State School. It was established as the Logan Provisional School and opened on 29 June 1869. Logan Village State School caters for students from Prep to Year six and opened in March 1872. The Centre Education Programme caters for students from Year 7 to Year 12. Loganholme State School opened 25 May 1873. Park Ridge State School opened on 23 April 1895.

Woodridge State School opened on 20 May 1924. Woodridge North State School opened on 23 January 1967. Logan City Special School caters for students from Early Childhood to Year twelve. It opened on 1 January 1972.

Woodridge State High School caters for students from Year seven to Year twelve. It opened on 1 February 1972. Berrinba East State School opened on 24 January 1978. Kingston College (originally Kingston State High School) was opened in 1978. It now caters for seven to year twelve and a continuing education campus. Marsden State school opened on 23 January 1978.

Shailer Park State High School caters for students from Year seven to Year twelve. It opened on 29 January 1980. Loganlea State High School caters for students from Year seven to Year twelve. It opened on 27 January 1981. Shailer Park State School opened on 25 January 1982. Browns Plains State School opened on 24 January 1983. Browns Plains State High School caters for students from Year seven to Year twelve. It opened 29 January 1985. Marsden State High School caters for students from Year seven to Year twelve. It opened on 27 January 1987.

Park Ridge State High School caters for students from Year seven to Year twelve. It opened on 29 January 1991. Yarrabilba State School opened on 22 January 2018.

== Economy ==
There are extensive industrial and commercial areas, mostly in the north and east of Woodridge, and west of Springwood and Daisy Hill, clustered in the triangle formed by Logan Road/Pacific Highway and Kingston Road, and extending west along Compton Road. The Crestmead industrial estate is designed for light to medium industry in the manufacturing sector.

Logan is Queensland's poker machine 'pokie' capital with over 2,128 machines in 41 registered sites. Per machine, each pokie pays out $5,886 which is the highest figure in the state.

Beenleigh Rum Distillery is oldest continuously operating rum distillery in Australia.

Tourism is emerging as a significant contributor to the local economy with an increasing portfolio of cultural and sporting events.

== Transport ==
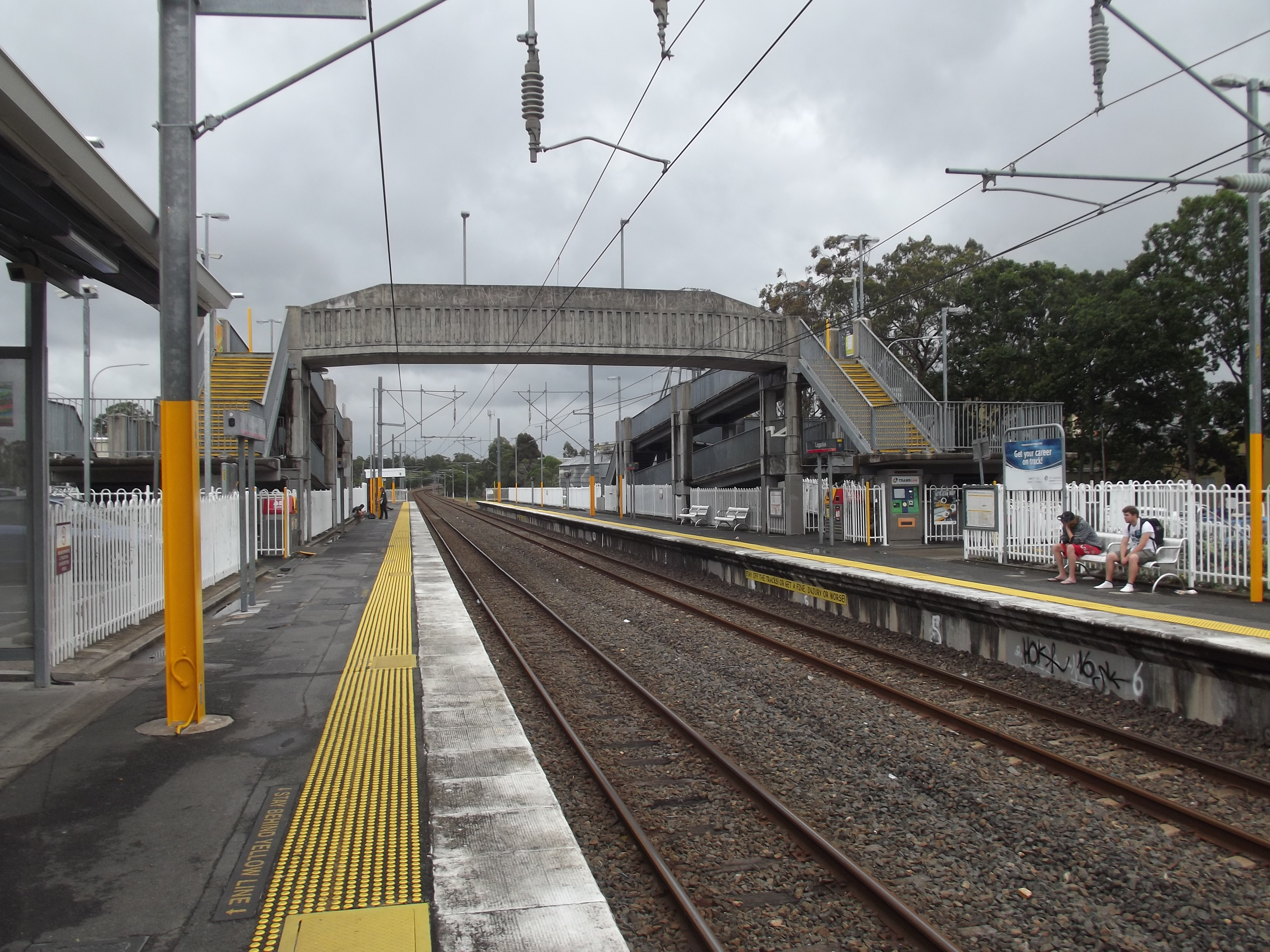
Loganlea railway station, 2012

Logan City is serviced by Queensland Rail's Beenleigh and Gold Coast railway lines. The stations are Trinder Park, Woodridge, Kingston, Loganlea, Bethania, Edens Landing, Holmview and Beenleigh although Gold Coast trains stop only at Beenleigh and Loganlea stations. Integrated ticketing was introduced in South East Queensland in 2004 through Translink which has improved access to public transport. TransLink bus routes now service most of the built-up areas of Logan City.

Logan City Bus Service is a bus operator, servicing places between Brisbane and Gold Coast at Logan City. First operated as Greenline Bus Service, it was purchased by Clark's Bus Service in 1987. Further development included the purchasing of Rochedale Bus Service in 1995. The trading name of Logan City Bus Service was adopted in 2003. Logan City Bus Service operates several routes under the Translink banner, most of which are based at Browns Plains bus station, Loganholme bus station and Springwood busway station. They also operate peak hour buses between Logan City and Brisbane City.

== Culture and sport ==
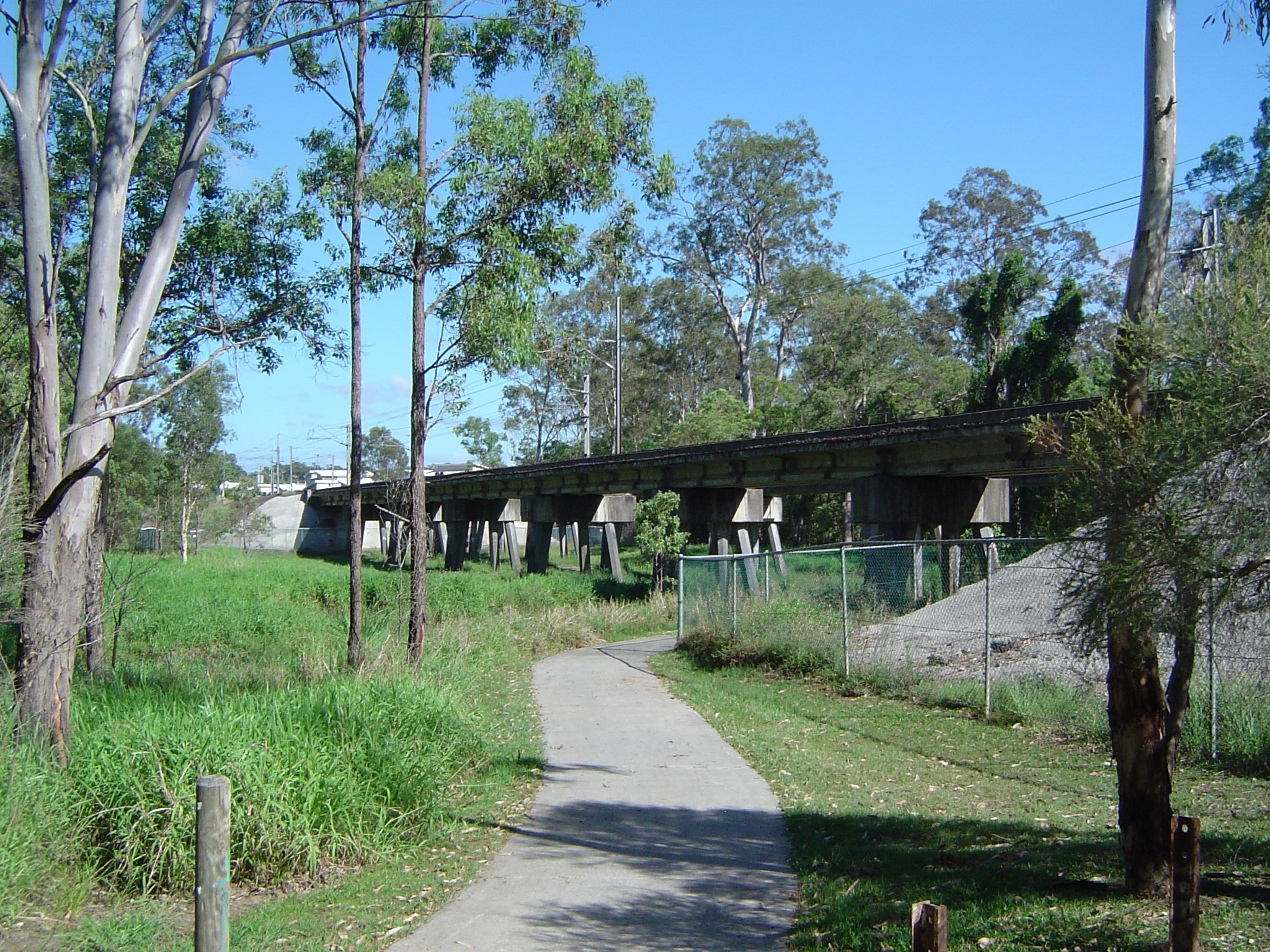
Scrubby Creek and bikeway at Gold Coast railway line crossing at Kingston, 2013

Logan boasts an array of 924 parks and reserves, each offering a variety of amenities. In addition to these green spaces, Logan provides opportunities for active pursuits. Locals and visitors can enjoy the community swimming pools, join sporting clubs, or explore cycling and walking tracks. there are also facilities for little athletics, along with self-guided heritage trails known as tinnie trails. People intrested in golf have plenty of options as well, while basketball and volleyball parks cater to team sports. The area also features skate parks, BMX tracks, walking groups, and go-karting venues,

Logan City has recently been under development for new bistro areas across the region. Cinemas, shopping complexes and parks are prevalent. The city also has a free public art gallery. The internationally successful Australian band Savage Garden, who sold 25 million albums, are from Logan and so is Olympic swimmer Jodie Henry, three time gold medalist in the pool at the 2004 Olympics and world record holder.

Logan City Council is transforming the historic Kingston Butter Factory into a cultural landmark that facilitates entertainment and arts programs year-round. The outdoor stage is launching at the end of March 2022, with the Butterbox Theatre and Living Arts Museum set to open mid-year 2022.

Logan City is home to Souths Logan Magpies rugby league team, one of the oldest existing rugby league clubs in Australia. It is also home to the Logan Thunder WNBL team.

In 2021, the Proud City of Logan campaign was launched, a local government initiative featuring six local champions, chosen to represent the diversity of people and lifestyles in the city.

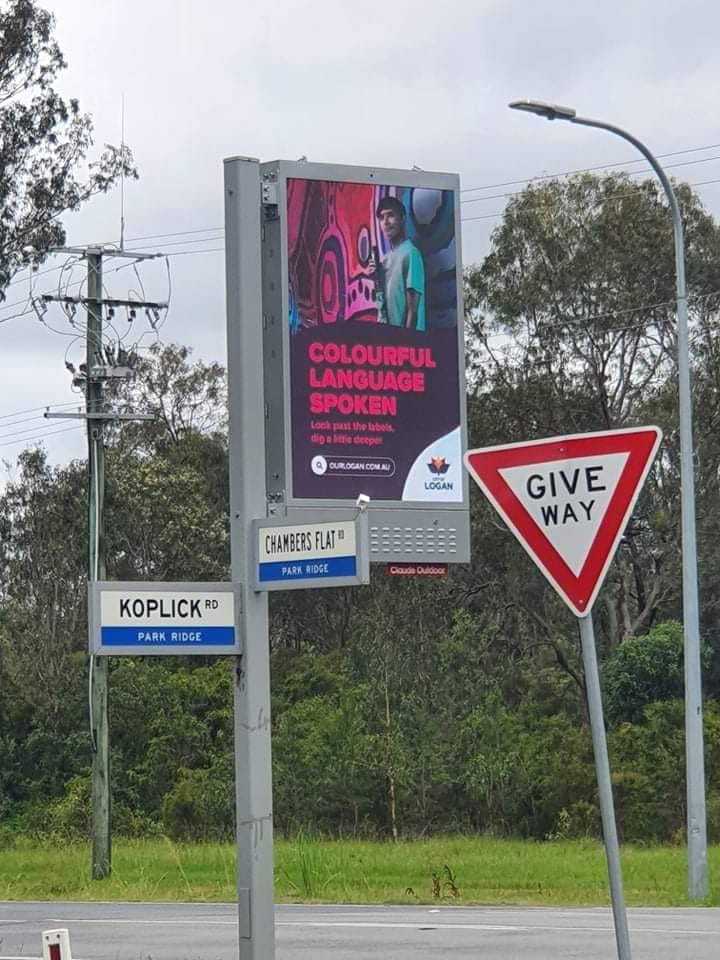
Proud City of Logan campaign signage featuring Shaun Davies

Logan City Council operates public libraries in Beenleigh, Greenbank, Jimboomba, Logan Central, Logan Hyperdome (Shailer Park), Logan North (Underwood), Logan Village, Logan West (Browns Plains), and Marsden.

A community arts centre is located at the former Kingston Butter Factory, now a locally listed heritage site.

== Climate ==
Logan City has a humid subtropical climate (Köppen climate classification Cfa).

Climate data for Beenleigh
Month	Jan	Feb	Mar	Apr	May	Jun	Jul	Aug	Sep	Oct	Nov	Dec	Year
Mean daily maximum °C (°F)	29.8 (85.6)	29.4 (84.9)	28.5 (83.3)	26.4 (79.5)	24.0 (75.2)	21.6 (70.9)	21.4 (70.5)	22.6 (72.7)	25.1 (77.2)	26.5 (79.7)	27.9 (82.2)	29.0 (84.2)	26.0 (78.8)
Mean daily minimum °C (°F)	20.6 (69.1)	20.5 (68.9)	19.1 (66.4)	16.0 (60.8)	12.6 (54.7)	10.1 (50.2)	8.8 (47.8)	9.5 (49.1)	12.4 (54.3)	14.9 (58.8)	17.5 (63.5)	19.2 (66.6)	15.1 (59.2)
Average precipitation mm (inches)	133.5 (5.26)	150.8 (5.94)	129.1 (5.08)	81.1 (3.19)	104.3 (4.11)	75.5 (2.97)	34.1 (1.34)	47.4 (1.87)	42.4 (1.67)	62.9 (2.48)	106.7 (4.20)	140.1 (5.52)	1,107.9 (43.63)
Source: https://weather.mla.com.au/climate-history/qld/beenleigh

== Suburbs ==
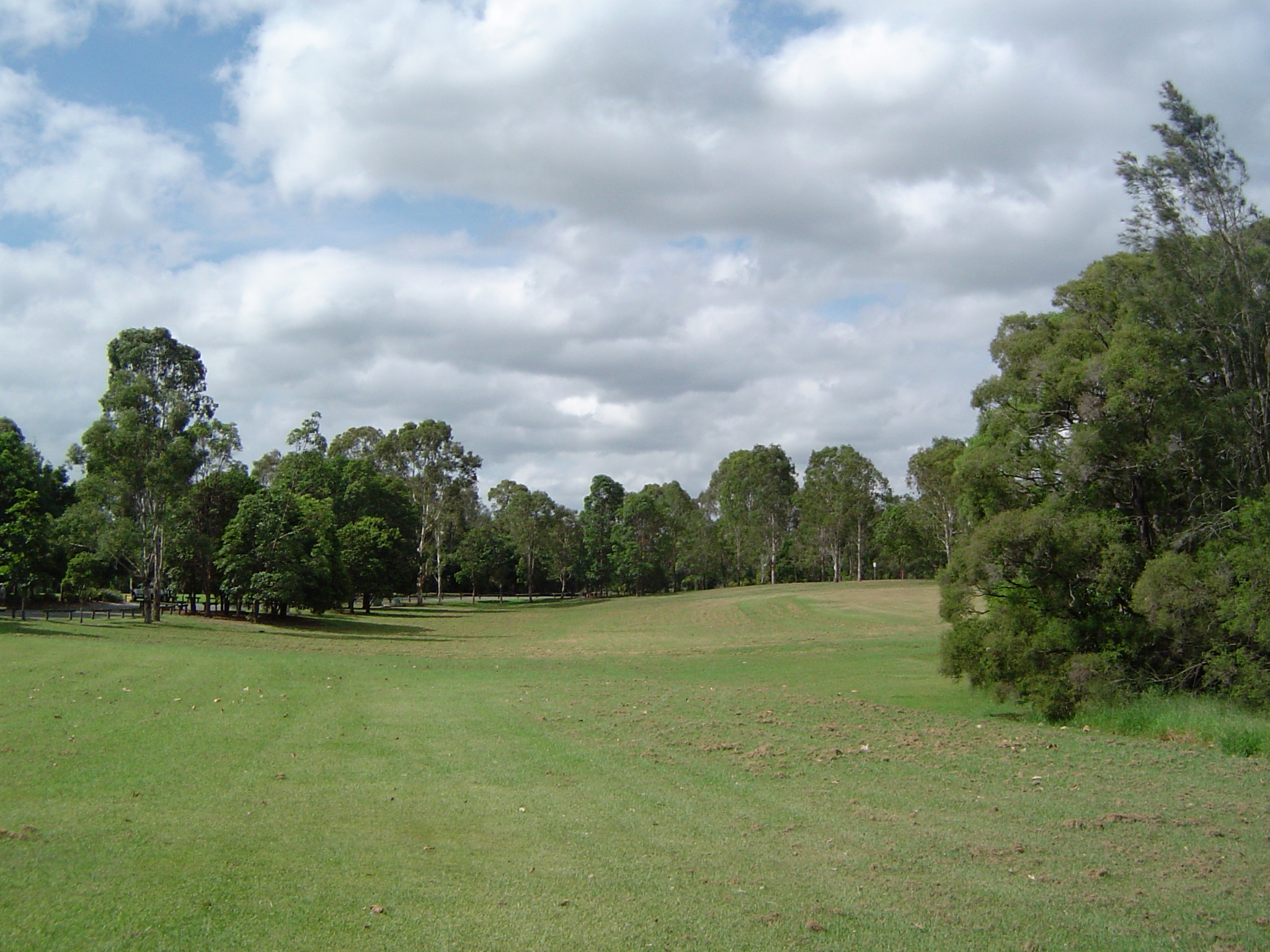
Riverdale Park at Meadowbrook, 2013

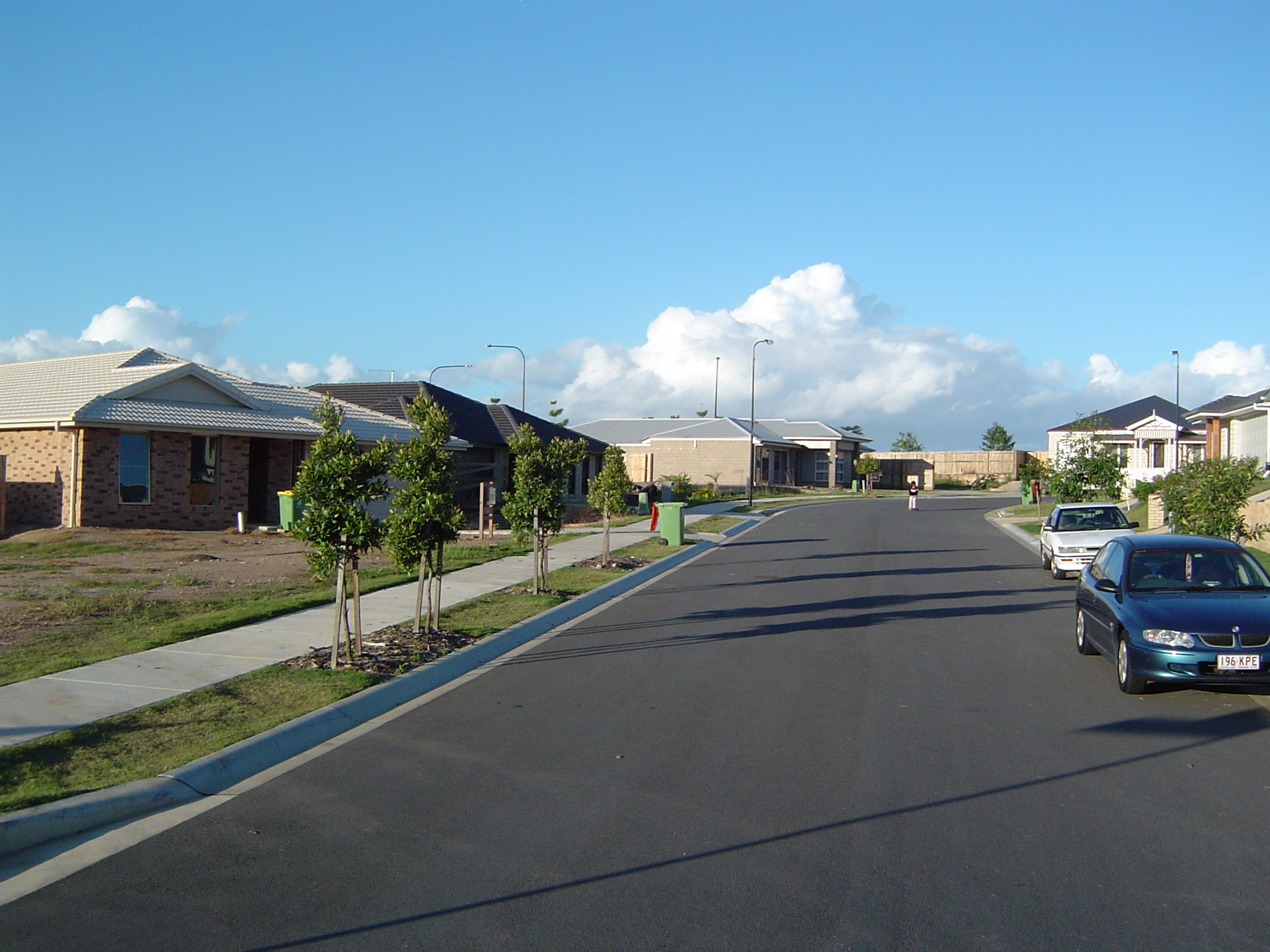
A new housing estate at Logan Reserve, 2014

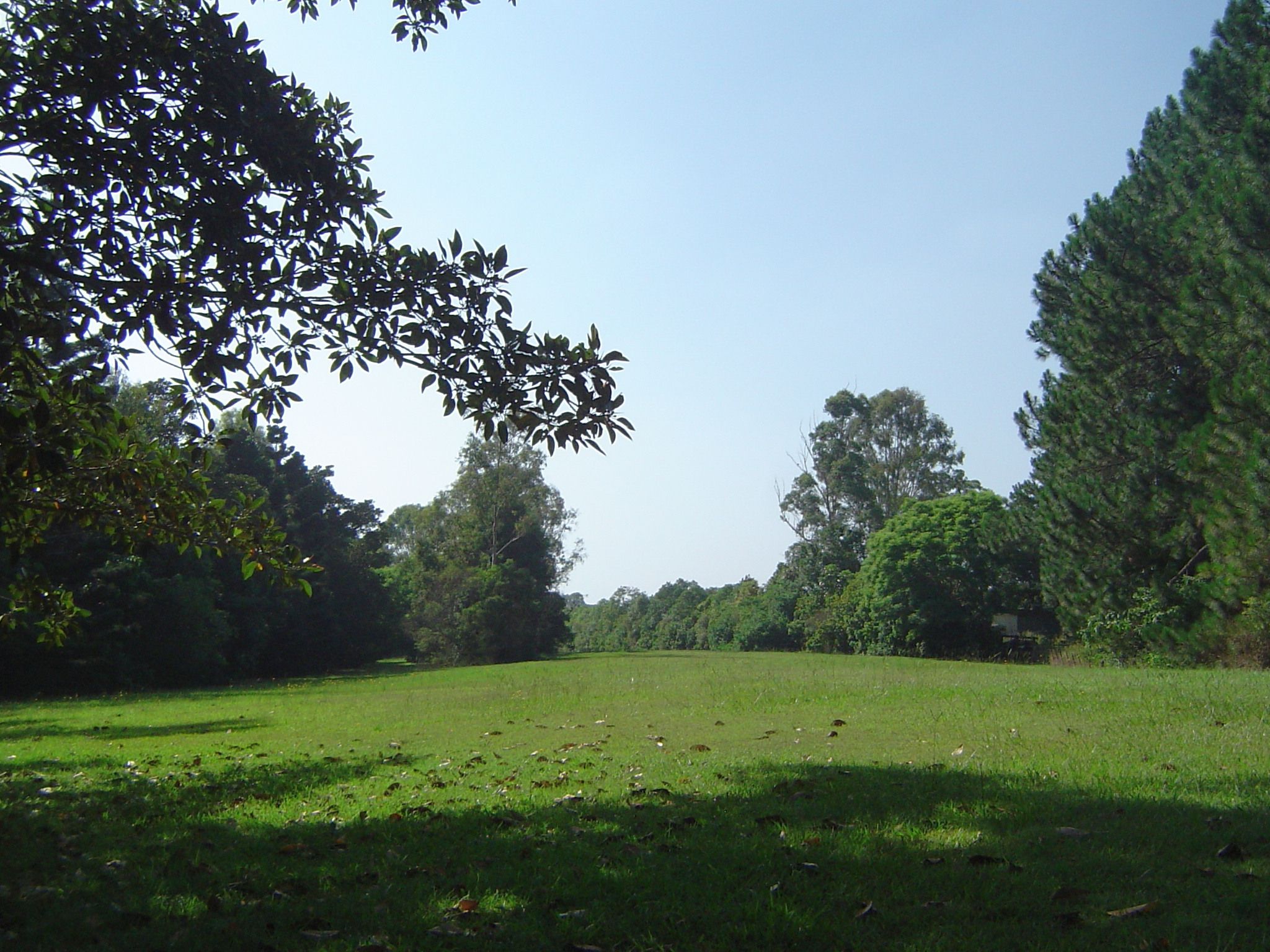
Henry Jordan Park, Waterford West, 2013

Over 80% of Logan is designated as non-urban, with the majority of land zoned rural, semi-rural or conservation. Until 2008, Logan had a stable boundary with neighbouring local government areas such as Beaudesert, Albert (later merged into Gold Coast) and Brisbane. The following suburbs were included within the pre-2008 area:

- Berrinba
- Boronia Heights
- Browns Plains
- Carbrook
- Cornubia
- Crestmead
- Daisy Hill
- Forestdale
- Greenbank*
- Heritage Park
- Hillcrest
- Kingston
- Logan Central
- Logan Reserve*
- Loganholme
- Loganlea
- Marsden
- Meadowbrook
- Park Ridge
- Priestdale
- Regents Park
- Rochedale South
- Shailer Park
- Slacks Creek
- Springwood
- Tanah Merah
- Underwood
- Waterford West
- Woodridge

In 2008, areas in northern Beaudesert as well as the Beenleigh conurbation in the Gold Coast were merged with Logan. As well as uniting Logan Reserve and Greenbank under one local government area, the following areas were added:

From Gold Coast:

- Bahrs Scrub
- Bannockburn
- Beenleigh
- Belivah
- Bethania
- Eagleby
- Edens Landing
- Holmview
- Mount Warren Park
- Waterford
- Windaroo
- Wolffdene

From Beaudesert:

- Allenview
- Buccan
- Cedar Creek
- Cedar Grove
- Cedar Vale
- Chambers Flat
- Jimboomba
- Kagaru^{1}
- Logan Village
- Lyons
- Mundoolun
- Munruben
- New Beith
- North Maclean
- Park Ridge South
- South Maclean
- Stockleigh
- Tamborine^{1}
- Undullah^{1}
- Veresdale^{1}
- Veresdale Scrub^{1}
- Woodhill
- Yarrabilba

^{1} - split with the Scenic Rim Region

== See also ==
- Mayes Cottage
