= Loganlea State High School =

Coordinates: 27°40′20.05″S 153°8′32.76″E

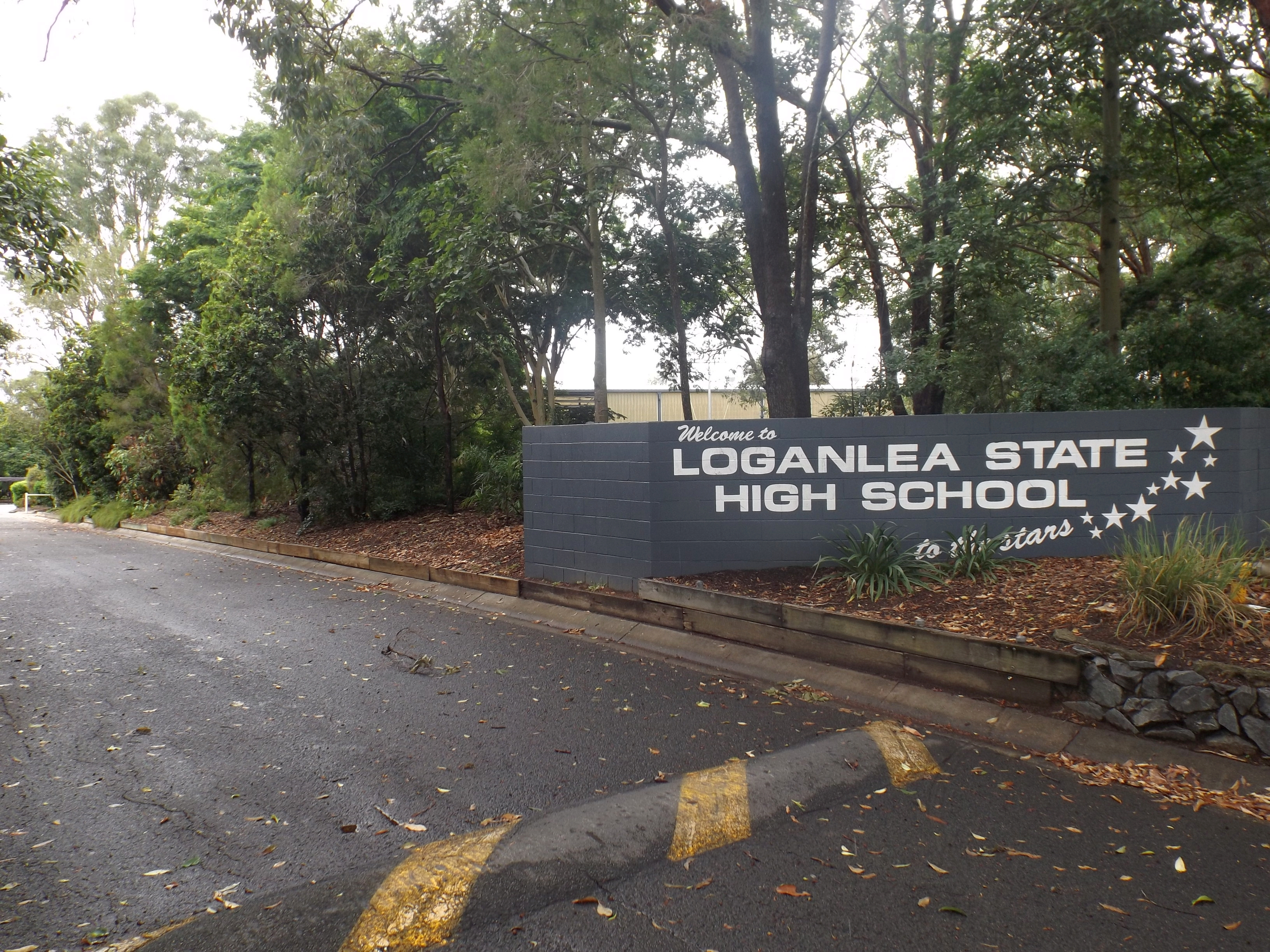
- Southern entrance, 2015

Location
- Neridah Street; Loganlea, Queensland, 4131; Australia

Information
- Type: Secondary school
- Motto: To the stars
- Opened: 1981
- Principal: Brenton Farleigh
- Grades: Year 7 to 12
- Campus size: 56 ha
- Color: Bottle Green
- Website: loganleashs.eq.edu.au

Loganlea State High School (LSHS) is a secondary school in Neridah Street at Loganlea, Logan City, Queensland, Australia, for students between years 7 and 12. The school was established in 1981 between the Logan River and the Beenleigh railway line.

It has an enrolment of over 928 students and over 100 staff members. The school is co-educational with students from a variety of cultural backgrounds.

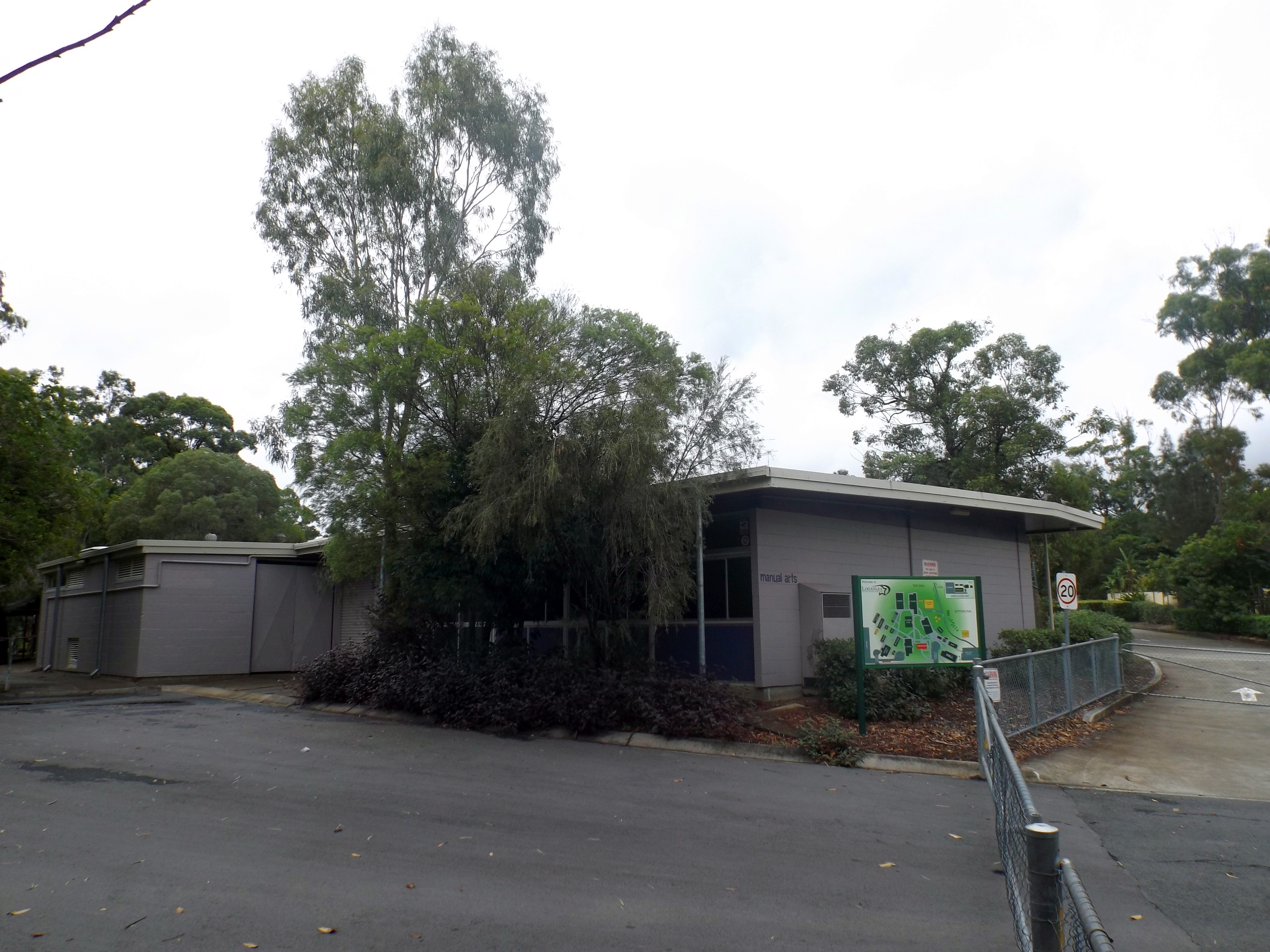
Manual Arts building, 2015

Loganlea State High operates a working property which enables learning opportunities in animal husbandry and farming. In recent years, students partaking in the agribusiness program have been able to spend time on a remote property in Central Queensland in order to gain practical skills as well as a sense of independence.

The school opened Knowledge House in 2006. Its purpose is to establish a more Indigenous-friendly curriculum.

The school participates in the Mini-Farm Project where food is grown for local charities. On the weekly harvest day students and volunteers pick and pack the produce.

The school has facilities such as a dance studio, trade training centre, kitchens, four science labs and a variety of different classrooms. The school also offers a well-being hub.

Students participate in group sporting activities as a member of one of Four houses; Pegasus (PEG) THE BEST HOUSE THERE, Hydra (HYD), Sagitta (SAG) and Ursa (URS). The school's Dance Eisteddfod Team competes in the Brisbane performing challenge and the Ipswich Dance Eisteddfod.

Alumni Lists from 1982 to 2012 can be found at the Names Database.

== Outdoor Education ==
Loganlea State High School has a commitment to utilising the outdoors as a core component of their teaching and learning approach. The school participates in programs, such as National Tree Day, which sees student planting thousands of native trees and plants across the campus each year.

The school boasts an impressive 56 hectares of land and host an Agribusiness Department, which has a farm set up with a range of animals and builds students skills in Animal Husbandry, Conservation and Land Management (Cert I & II), Agrifood Operations (Cert I) and Agriculture (Cert II).

In 2017, the school began offering a Certificate II in Outdoor Recreation, with specialisations in Canoeing, Bushwalking/Navigation and Fishing. The program is run on campus and offsite at locations which include Lamington National Park, Maroon Dam and Rainbow Beach. One of the school's Mottos is "To the stars".

The school has 9 STAR programs including Loganlea Institute of Sport (LIS), Hospitality, Loganlea Youth Development Program (LYDP), Dance, Signature, Agribusiness, School of Rock, Digital Innovations and Netball Excellence.

== See also ==
- List of schools in Greater Brisbane
