= Logan Hospital =

Coordinates: 27.6668°S 153.1488°E

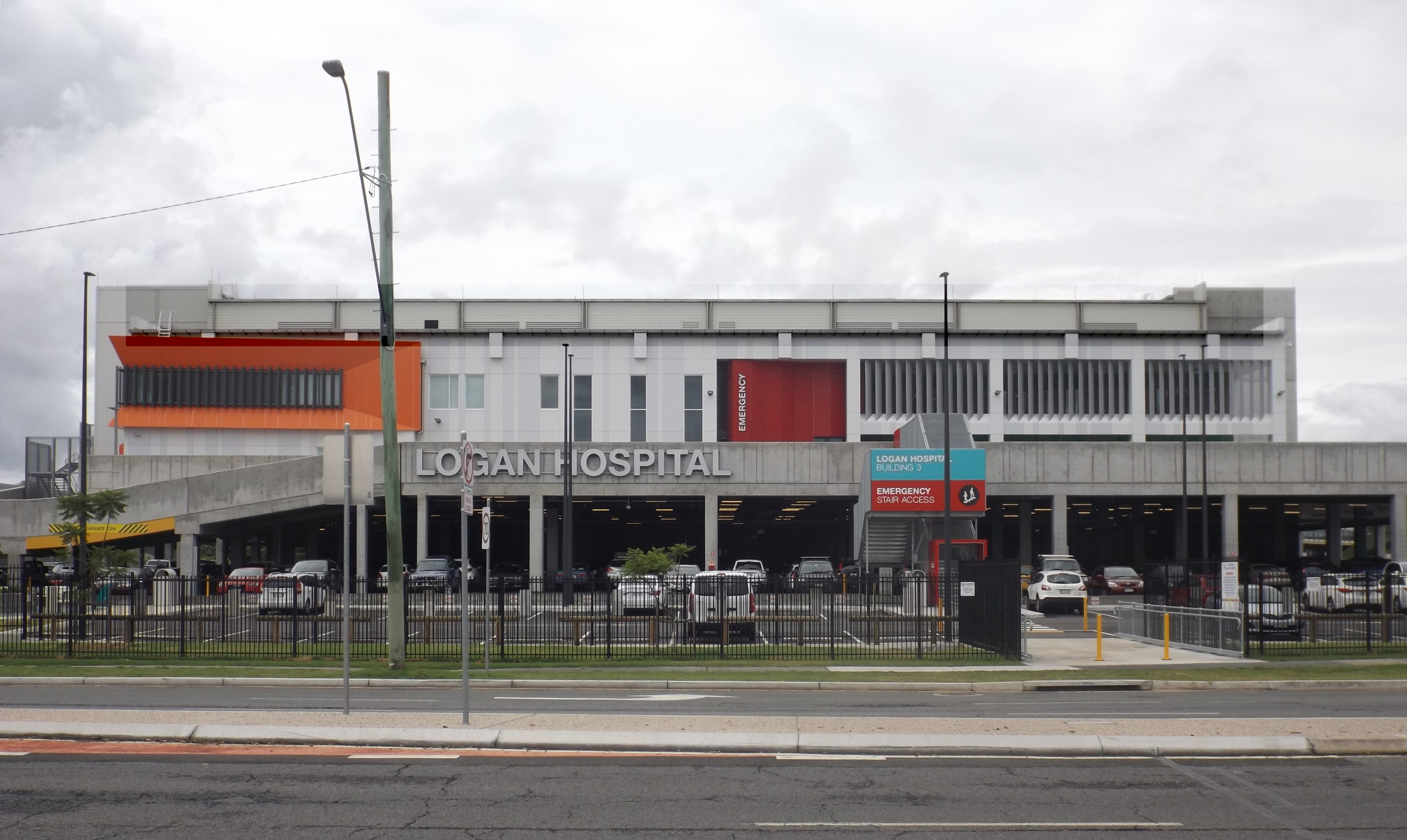
- The recently upgraded section includes a new entrance to the Emergency Department.

Geography
- Location: Corner of Armstrong Road and Loganlea Road, Meadowbrook, Logan City, Queensland, Australia

History
- Founded: 1990

Links
- Website: metrosouth.health.qld.gov.au/logan-hospital
- Lists: Hospitals in Australia

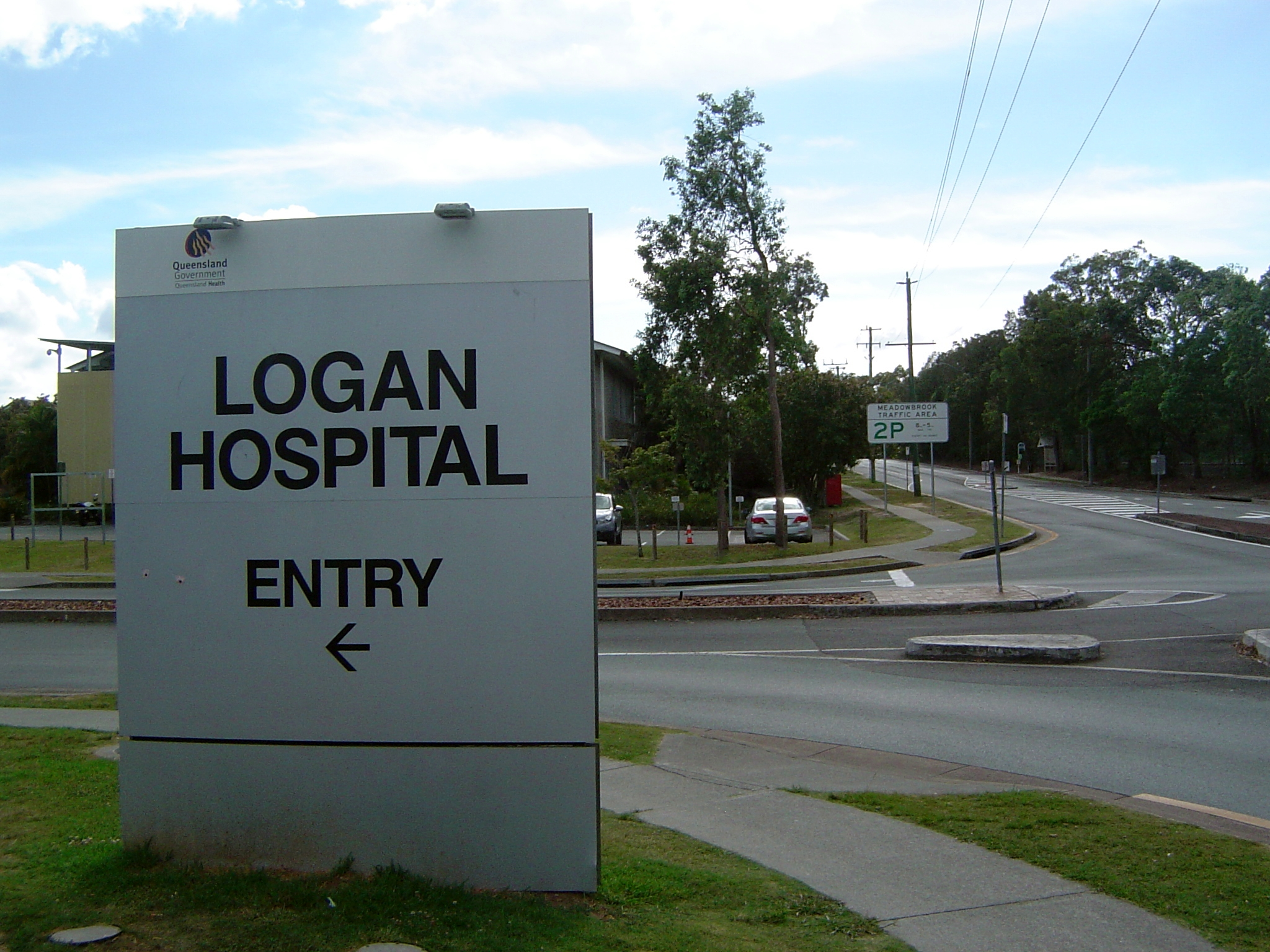
Hospital entrance

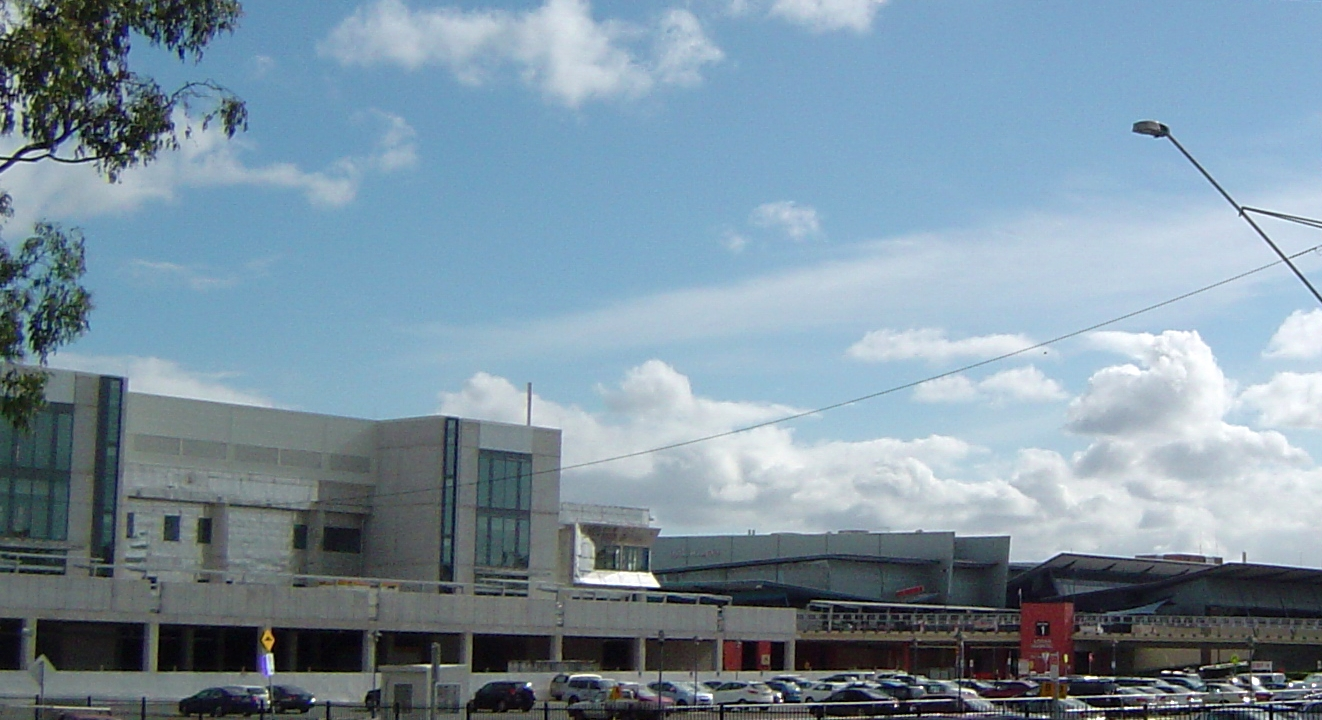
Logan Hospital, 2014

Logan Hospital is a major public hospital and healthcare centre servicing the Logan region in the state of Queensland, located at the corner of Armstrong and Loganlea Roads in Meadowbrook, Queensland, Australia. The hospital is affiliated with Griffith University.

The hospital is operated by the Queensland Government through its Metro South Health portfolio, and provides a range of acute medical, surgical, rehabilitation, maternity and paediatric services to both children and adults. As of 2024, the emergency ward is the second busiest in Queensland, seeing more than 109,000 presentations each year. The catchment population served by Logan Hospital is generally younger, less well-off and more culturally or linguistically diverse than the national median.

The hospital's services include mental health treatment, palliative care, and other medical and surgical services such as obstetrics, gynaecology, orthopaedics, otolaryngology (commonly known as ear, nose and throat), paediatrics, respiratory medicine, neurology, endocrinology, cardiology, renal dialysis, anaesthetics, emergency medicine, intensive care medicine, specialist outpatient clinics, oral health, pathology, medical imaging, allied health services, and pharmacy.

== History ==
Logan Hospital has grown from a 48-bed community hospital in 1990, and 195-bed hospital in 1995, to a 448-bed hospital today, mirroring the rapid growth in population in the Logan region. It was opened by then Premier of Queensland Wayne Goss.

The phase 1 opening in 1990 included an emergency department, general medical wards and a dialysis unit. In 1993, the hospital was included in a reference group for intercultural collaboration. During phase 2, the intensive care unit and coronary care unit opened in 1993, after being relocated from its sister site QEII Hospital.

The ambulatory services building was opened in 2011 after the adjoining private hospital was repurposed.

In 2012, work began on a new emergency department as well as a children's inpatient and rehabilitation unit. An expanded surgical unit replaced the former emergency department site. A rehabilitation unit, MAPU, orthogeriatric and perioperative services started in 2014 and early 2015. Further major expansion projects commenced in 2019 to accommodate rapid population growth in the area, above the state average.

== Abortion controversy ==
In 2016 Logan Hospital's Department of Obstetrics and Gynaecology controversially made a written submission to the Parliamentary Committee on the Abortion Law Reform Amendment Bill 2016. This submission requested that medical practitioners who were conscientious objectors be exempt from the legal obligation to participate in terminations. It also proposed that medical practitioners could refuse to refer a woman in need of a termination to another doctor for ongoing care. There was no specific mention in this submission as to whether the exemption would apply in the circumstance of a pregnant woman's life being at risk.

For pregnant women in the Logan Hospital catchment this is highly relevant to their care in pregnancy, as maternal deaths have occurred in the context of restrictive abortion policy, including the 2012 death of Savita Halappanavar in Ireland.

The submission on behalf of the Department of Obstetrics and Gynaecology drew public attention and media coverage because it effectively excludes women living in Brisbane's south from abortion access within the public health system, as the only other public hospital in the catchment is the Mater Women's and Children's Hospital, which is Catholic and actively anti-abortion.

== See also ==
- List of hospitals in Australia
