= Ferny Glen, Queensland =

Ferny Glen
- Suburb
- Interactive map of Ferny Glen
- Coordinates: 28.0752°S 153.1566°E
- Country: Australia
- State: Queensland
- LGA: Scenic Rim Region
- Location: 8.8 km (5.5 mi) S of Canungra; 35.0 km (21.7 mi) SE of Beaudesert; 86 km (53 mi) S of Brisbane CBD

Government
  - State electorate: Scenic Rim
  - Federal division: Wright

Area
  - Total: 12.9 km^{2} (5.0 sq mi)

Population
  - Total: 91 (2021 census)
  - Density: 7.05/km^{2} (18.27/sq mi)
- Time zone: UTC+10:00 (AEST)
- Postcode: 4275
Suburbs around Ferny Glen
Witheren	Witheren	Witheren
Sarabah	Ferny Glen	Witheren
Sarabah	Illinbah	Flying Fox

Ferny Glen is a rural locality in the Scenic Rim Region, Queensland, Australia. In the 2021 census, Ferny Glen had a population of 91 people.

== Geography ==
The Coomera River enters the locality from the south (Illinbah) and flows through the locality exiting to the north-east (Witheren). The locality is the valley created by the river.

Upper Coomera Road enters the locality from the north-east (Witheren) and exits to the south-east (Flying Fox).

The land use is irrigated pastures for grazing near the river with grazing on native vegetation on the slopes of the valley. There are some small areas of rural residential housing.

== History ==
Flying Fox State School opened on 21 June 1920 and closed in 1962. It was on the western side of Upper Coomera Road near the Coomera River (approx 28.0810°S 153.1561°E), within the present-day boundaries of Ferny Glen.

== Demographics ==
In the 2016 census, Ferny Glen had a population of 84 people. The locality contains 40 households, in which 42.7% of the population are males and 57.3% of the population are females with a median age of 53, 15 years above the national average. The average weekly household income is $1,312, $126 below the national average.

In the 2021 census, Ferny Glen had a population of 91 people.

== Education ==
There are no schools in Ferny Glen. The nearest government primary school is Canungra State School in Canungra to the north. The nearest government secondary school is Tamborine Mountain State High School in Tamborine Mountain to the north.
