= Illinbah, Queensland =

Illinbah
- Suburb
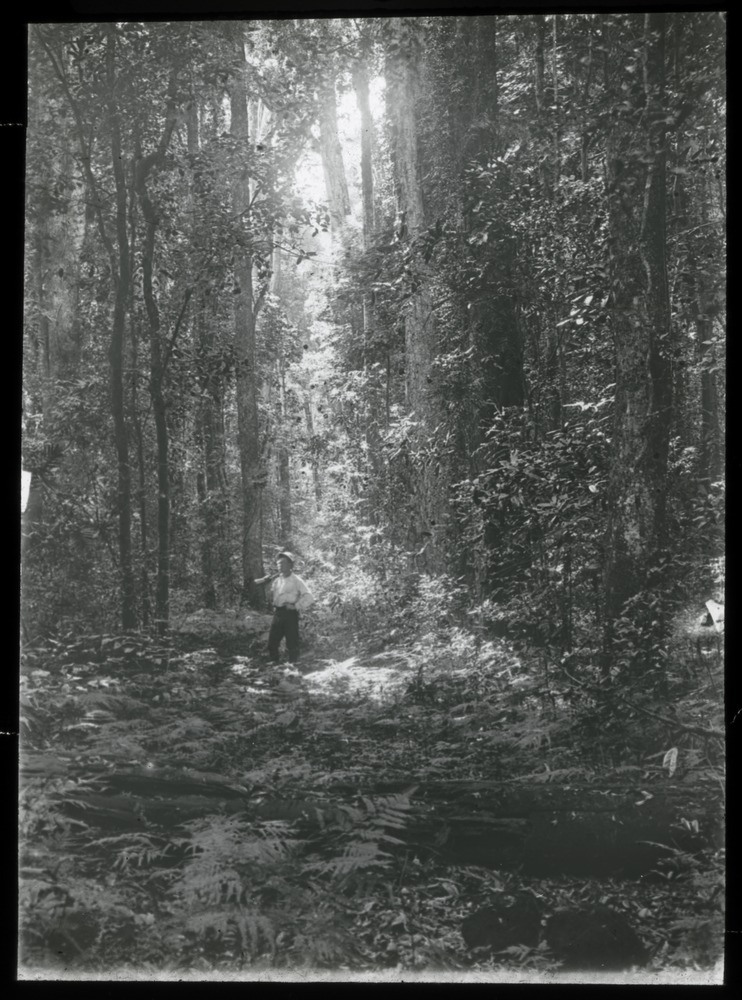
- Old cedar logging track near Illinbah in Lamington National Park, 1909-1915.

- Interactive map of Illinbah
- Coordinates: 28.1286°S 153.1524°E
- Country: Australia
- State: Queensland
- LGA: Scenic Rim Region
- Location: 36.3 km (22.6 mi) SSW of Tamborine Mountain; 38.9 km (24.2 mi) SW of Southport; 45.4 km (28.2 mi) SE of Beaudesert; 89.7 km (55.7 mi) S of Brisbane CBD

Government
  - State electorate: Scenic Rim
  - Federal division: Wright

Area
  - Total: 19.4 km^{2} (7.5 sq mi)

Population
  - Total: 128 (2021 census)
  - Density: 6.60/km^{2} (17.09/sq mi)
- Time zone: UTC+10:00 (AEST)
- Postcode: 4275
Suburbs around Illinbah
Sarabah	Ferny Glen	Flying Fox
Sarabah	Illinbah	Beechmont
O'Reilly	Binna Burra	Binna Burra

Illinbah is a rural locality in the Scenic Rim Region, Queensland, Australia. In the 2021 census, Illinbah had a population of 128 people.

== Geography ==
Illinbah occupies a section of the valley along the upper Coomera River. At the southern extent of the locality the elevation reaches greater than 690 metres (2,260 ft) above sea level.

== Demographics ==
In the 2011 census, Illinbah reported a population of 313 people, 50.5% female and 49.5% male. The average age of the Illinbah population was 42 years of age, 5 years above the Australian median of 37. 73.9% of people living in Illinbah were born in Australia. The other top responses for country of birth were England 6.4%, New Zealand 6.4%, Germany 1.9%, Canada 1%, Czech Republic 1%. 89.8% of people spoke only English at home; the next most common languages were 1.6% Japanese, 1.3% Croatian, 1.3% Spanish, 1% German.

In the 2016 census, Illinbah had a population of 129 people.

In the 2021 census, Illinbah had a population of 128 people.

== Education ==
There are no schools in Illinbah. The nearest government primary school is Canungra State School in Canungra to the north. The nearest government secondary school is Tamborine Mountain State High School in Tamborine Mountain to the north.

== Attractions ==
Cooginbano Lookout is within the Lamington National Park (28.1558°S 153.1630°E). It offers views over the Coomera River valley.
