= Flying Fox, Queensland =

Flying Fox
- Suburb
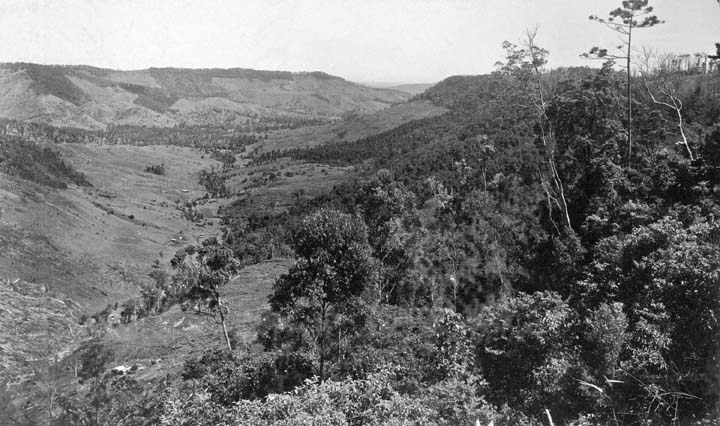
- Looking across Flying Fox towards Cainbable and Tamborine, 1933

- Interactive map of Flying Fox
- Coordinates: 28.1019°S 153.1705°E
- Country: Australia
- State: Queensland
- LGA: Scenic Rim Region
- Location: 11.6 km (7.2 mi) S of Canungra; 30.0 km (18.6 mi) SW of Nerang; 35.4 km (22.0 mi) S of Tamborine Mountain; 37.8 km (23.5 mi) SE of Beaudesert; 88.7 km (55.1 mi) S of Brisbane

Government
  - State electorate: Scenic Rim
  - Federal division: Wright

Area
  - Total: 8.6 km^{2} (3.3 sq mi)

Population
  - Total: 61 (2021 census)
  - Density: 7.09/km^{2} (18.37/sq mi)
- Time zone: UTC+10:00 (AEST)
- Postcode: 4275
Suburbs around Flying Fox
Ferny Glen	Ferny Glen	Witheren
Illinbah	Flying Fox	Beechmont
Illinbah	Beechmont	Beechmont

Flying Fox is a rural locality in the Scenic Rim Region, Queensland, Australia. In the 2021 census, Flying Fox had a population of 61 people.

== Geography ==
The locality consists of a pair of north-south valleys. The watercourse Flying Fox Creek rises to the south (Beechmont) and flows north through the eastern valley of the locality of Flying Fox exiting to the north (Ferny Glen) where it becomes a tributary of the Coomera River. An unnamed creek also rises to the south (Beechmont) and flows north through the western valley of the locality of Flying Fox where it becomes a tributary of Flying Fox Creek on the locality's northern boundary.

== History ==
Flying Fox State School opened on 21 June 1920 and closed in 1962. It was on the western side of Upper Coomera Road near the Coomera River (approx 28.0810°S 153.1561°E), now within the present-day boundaries of neighbouring Ferny Glen.

== Demographics ==
In the 2016 census, Flying Fox had a population of 65 people. The locality contained 19 households, in which 53.8% of the population were males and 46.2% of the population were females with a median age of 41, 3 years above the national average. The average weekly household income was $2,399, $961 above the national average.

In the 2021 census, Flying Fox had a population of 61 people.

== Education ==
There are no schools in Flying Fox. The nearest government primary schools are Canungra State School in Canungra to the north and Beechmont State School in neighbouring Beechmont to the south-east. The nearest government secondary schools are Tamborine Mountain State High School in Tamborine Mountain to the north and Nerang State High School in Nerang to the north-east.
