= O'Reilly, Queensland =

O'Reilly
- Suburb
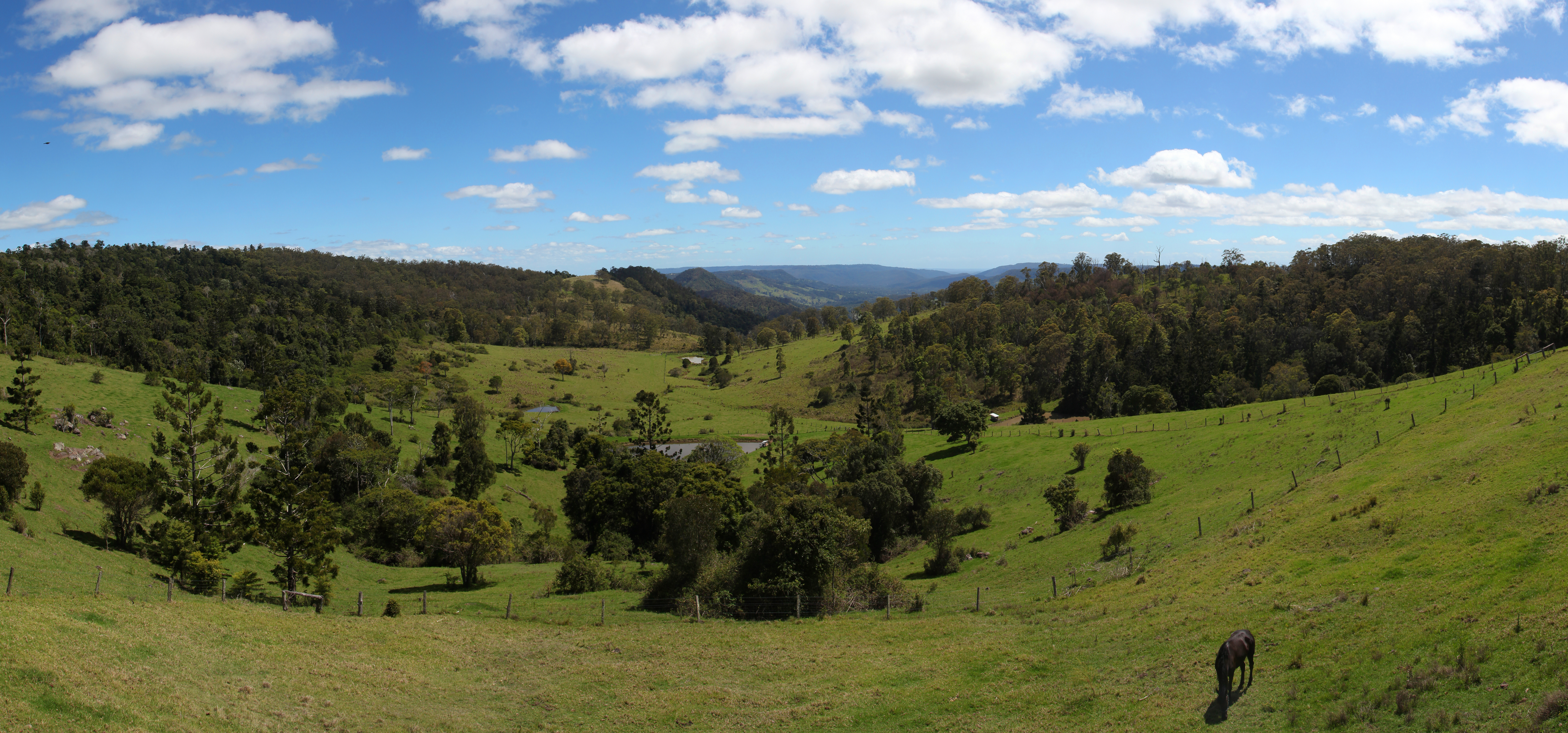
- Mountain scenery, 2013

- Interactive map of O'Reilly
- Coordinates: 28.2100°S 153.1272°E
- Country: Australia
- State: Queensland
- LGA: Scenic Rim Region
- Location: 35.8 km (22.2 mi) S of Canungra; 39.3 km (24.4 mi) SSE of Beaudesert; 48.7 km (30.3 mi) S of Mount Tamborine; 114 km (71 mi) S of Brisbane

Government
  - State electorate: Scenic Rim
  - Federal division: Wright

Area
  - Total: 73.7 km^{2} (28.5 sq mi)

Population
  - Total: 114 (2021 census)
  - Density: 1.547/km^{2} (4.006/sq mi)
- Time zone: UTC+10:00 (AEST)
- Postcode: 4275
Suburbs around O'Reilly
| Cainbable | Sarabah | Illinbah |
| Kerry | O'Reilly | Binna Burra |
| Darlington | Southern Lamington | Limpinwood (NSW) |

O'Reilly is a rural locality in the Scenic Rim Region, Queensland, Australia. It borders New South Wales. In the 2021 census, O'Reilly had a population of 114 people.

== Geography ==
O'Reilly is located on Queensland's border with New South Wales on the elevated Lamington Plateau. The plateau remains heavily vegetated by Gondwana Rainforests.

Almost the whole of the locality is within the Lamington National Park, except for the Boonyong pastoral property (28.2183°S 153.1165°E) and the O'Reilly's Rainforest Retreat mountain resort (28.2305°S 153.1304°E).

The Lamington National Park contains a network of walking tracks, lookouts and numerous waterfalls.

== Demographics ==
In the 2016 census, O'Reilly had "no people or a very low population".

In the 2021 census, O'Reilly had a population of 114 people.

== Education ==
There are no schools in O'Reilly. The nearest government primary school is Canungra State School in Canungra. The nearest government secondary school is Tamborine Mountain State High School in Tamborine Mountain.
