= Beechmont, Queensland =

Beechmont
- Town
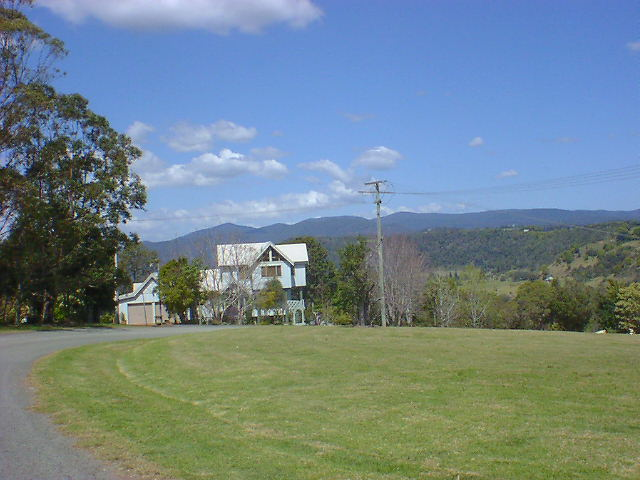
- Beechmont

- Interactive map of Beechmont
- Coordinates: 28.1078°S 153.2132°E
- Country: Australia
- State: Queensland
- LGA: Scenic Rim Region
- Location: 27.1 km (16.8 mi) SW of Nerang; 27.3 km (17.0 mi) S of Tamborine Mountain; 41.5 km (25.8 mi) SE of Beaudesert; 90.2 km (56.0 mi) S of Brisbane

Government
  - State electorate: Scenic Rim
  - Federal division: Wright

Area
  - Total: 34.4 km^{2} (13.3 sq mi)

Population
  - Total: 848 (2021 census)
  - Density: 24.65/km^{2} (63.85/sq mi)
- Time zone: UTC+10:00 (AEST)
- Postcode: 4211
Localities around Beechmont
Witheren	Lower Beechmont	Advancetown
Flying Fox; Illinbah	Beechmont	Numinbah Valley
Illinbah	Binna Burra	Numinbah Valley

Beechmont is a rural town and locality in the Scenic Rim Region, Queensland, Australia. In the 2021 census, the locality of Beechmont had a population of 848 people.

== Geography ==
Beechmont is positioned on a forested ridge leading from the Lamington Plateau to Tamborine Mountain. Outstanding views in nearly all directions means that on a clear day Cunninghams Gap and other Scenic Rim landforms are visible as well as Flinders Peak, Moogerah Peaks and the D'Aguilar Range to the north west of Brisbane. To the north west of Beechmont sits the locality of Lower Beechmont and to the south is Binna Burra.

Roads in the area are narrow and windy, some are prone to rockfalls and some with very steep slopes. The road to Binna Burra Lodge and access to Lamington National Park goes through Beechmont. The § Rosins Lookout Conservation Park is a popular launch site for hangliders and paragliders.

Beechmont has the following named peaks:

- The Summit in the south of the locality (28.1677°S 153.1888°E) at 667 metres (2,188 ft) above sea level
- Warples Hill in the south-east of the locality (28.1358°S 153.1902°E) at 587 metres (1,926 ft) above sea level

Killarney Falls is a waterfall on Back Creek in the north of the locality (28.0758°S 153.2049°E).

== History ==
The Beechmont district was occupied by the Yugambeh people before the arrival of European timber cutters in the 1880s. The district takes its current name from the white beech trees in the area.

The Beechmont area was opened up for selection in 1886, however many of the early settlers left after a short stay on the mountain. By the turn of the century, only three families had established themselves in the area.

The Beechmont State School opened on 15 August 1904.

Fruit such as apples were grown in the 1910s in the rich Beech Mountain soils of the area, but were halted due to fruit fly infestations.

St John's Presbyterian Church opened on Sunday 21 February 1932 with a service commencing conducted by Reverend Alexander Duff. It was the first church in Beechmont and part of the Southport parish. In May 1947 two memorial windows were dedicated to Keith Scott and Kent Summerville, members of the congregation who died in the RAAF during World War II. Following the closure of the church in 1980, the memorial windows were removed and on 25 April (Anzac Day) 1998 the windows were unveiled in a memorial gazebo at Graceleigh Park in Beechmont Road (28.1255°S 153.1866°E) adjacent to the Beechmont War Memorial. The church is now used for holiday accommodation.

The tourism potential of Beechmont was realised in 1910 as one of the motivations to build a railway line to Canungra, which led to the Queensland Government deciding in 1911 to construct the Canungra branch line from Logan Village railway station on the South Coast railway line to Canungra. Construction began in 1913 and the line opened to Canungra railway station on 2 July 1915.

A dairying property located near Beechmont on the Nerang River was advertised to be sold by auction 23 November 1920 by Cameron Brothers auctioneers. The plan shows the land for sale, 858 acres, being subdivision 2 of portion 106, Parish of Gilston, on Beech Mountain, facing the present Binna Burra Road, within 13 miles of Nerang Township.

From the 1920s, the area became known as a mountain tourist destination.

In July 1936, Dr John Bradfield, the designer of the Story Bridge in Brisbane and the Sydney Harbour Bridge was forced to stop at Beechmont when heavy rain prevented the completion of his journey to Binna Burra.

On 4 February 1942, a US P-40 Kittyhawk, piloted by Flight Lieutenant Donald Harry Hunter from 3 Service Flying Training School (3 SFTS) RAAF at Amberley, crashed on the side of Battens Ridge. Hunter was killed in the accident.

On 23 January 1971, Rosin Lookout was established as a rest area. It was named after either banana grower Frederick John Rosin, a pioneer of the Nerang district who was the first owner of the land on which the lookout stands or his son John Henry Rosin who owned the land in 1968, when the Beaudesert Shire Council acquired the land.

On 18 July 1971, RAAF Sabre jet A94-962 flying out of Numinbah Valley, struck and severed high voltage powerlines between Beechmont and Binna Burra. The jet suffered damage to the nose, canopy, and tailplane but was able to return to Amberley.

On Sunday 11 November (Remembrance Day) 1990, the Beechmont War Memorial was unveiled in Graceleigh Park.

As at 2019, there are still dairy farms operational in the area, but only three remain in operation as the area is experiencing increasing levels of development.

== Demographics ==
In the 2016 census, the locality of Beechmont had a population of 842 people, of which 50.2% are males and 49.8% are females with a median age of 46, 8 above the national average. The average weekly household income is $1,399, $39 below the national average. 1.6% of Beechmont's population is either of Aborigional or Torres Strait Islander descent. 64.6% of the population aged 15 or over is either registered or de facto married, while 35.4% of the population is not married. 25.8% of the population is currently attending some form of a compulsory education. The most common nominated ancestries were English (31.7%), Australian (28.2%) and Scottish (9.4%), while the most common countries of birth are Australia (73.4%), England (5.1%) and New Zealand (5.0%), and the most commonly spoken languages at home are English (90.9%), French (0.5%) and German (0.4%). The most common nominated religions were No religion (44.0%), Anglican (14.5%) and Catholic (14.1%). The most common occupation was a technician/trades worker (18.4%) and the majority/plurality of residents worked 40 or more hours per week (36.8%).

In the 2021 census, the locality of Beechmont had a population of 848 people.

== Heritage listings ==
Beechmont has a number of heritage-listed sites, including:

- Binna Burra Road: Binna Burra Cultural Landscape
- 2-4 McInnes Court (28.1236°S 153.1959°E): Beechmont Church (former St John's Presbyterian Church)

== Education ==
Beechmont State School is a government primary (Prep-6) school for boys and girls at 1922 Beechmont Road (28.1248°S 153.1856°E). In 2018, the school had an enrolment of 109 students with 10 teachers (7 full-time equivalent) and 8 non-teaching staff (5 full-time equivalent).

There is no secondary school in Beechmont. The nearest government secondary schools are Tamborine Mountain State High School in Tamborine Mountain to the north and Nerang State High School in Nerang to the north-east.

== Amenities ==
St John's Catholic Church is on Windabout Street (corner of Flemington Road, 28.1126°S 153.1858°E). It is part of the Nerang parish and services are held on the fourth Sunday of each month.

Graceleigh Park is a general purpose sports ground located next to the Beechmont State School. The park was named after the 'Graceleigh' property, one of the early dairy farms in the area and owned by John Sharp.

The park area provides facilities for cricket, soccer, football, tennis, and netball. The Beechmont Cricket Club and Beechmont Tennis Club both operate club rooms on the site.

The Scenic Rim Regional Council operates a mobile library service which visits Graceleigh Park.

The 'Hall on Graceleigh' is a multi-purpose school hall located adjacent to the Beechmont State School and Graceleigh Park. It was built under the Building the Education Revolution stimulus program in 2011. Under an agreement with the local community group and Scenic Rim Council, the hall was built on council land in exchange for it being made available for general community use.

The 'Providence Farm Hall' was the original Beechmont community hall built in October 1948 on land donated by the McKenzie family. The hall was the venue of many community dances, celebrations, and social events. In 2011, the hall was sold back to the McKenzie family and the proceeds reinvested in community projects.

The Beechmont Community Centre is located on the old state school grounds at Beechmont. The centre is home to many community groups and clubs. The Headmaster's Cafe operates from the original headmaster's residence at the site. The Beech Mountain Association, who manages the site, operates the monthly Beechmont Markets.

Rosins Conservation Area is part of a collection of linked conservation areas, including Springbrook National Park and Pocket Road Conservation Area, that provide a large area of core habitat for a wide range of native fauna.

== Infrastructure ==
There is a mobile phone tower near the village. Internet is available with ADSL1 and ADSL2+ over copper lines. The Beechmont exchange is connected via a microwave link to the Telstra National Network. Beechmont is listed on the National Broadband Network (NBN) roll-out plans for Jul-Dec 2019 with a deployment of fixed wireless technology.

Tarred roads are available to Canungra and to Nerang. The roads are narrow and windy and sometimes closed or reduced to one lane passes after landslides and other rain induced incidents.

== Attractions ==
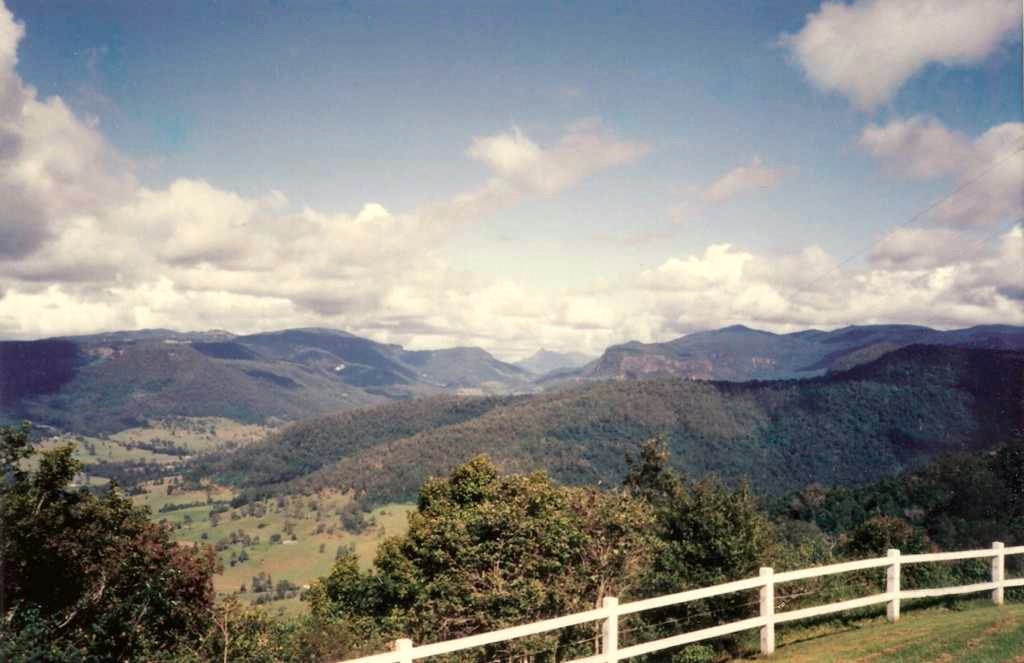
View from Rosins Lookout, 1994

Rosins Lookout is a lookout on top of the ridgeline near 1684 Beechmont Road (28.1169°S 153.2025°E). It offers views across over the Numinbah Valley across to Springbrook and Mount Warning. There are barbeque and picnic facilities. The lookout is a popular launch site for hang gliders and paragliders.

Beechmont War Memorial is in Graceleigh Park in Beechmont Road (28.1255°S 153.1867°E).

== Notable residents ==
Notable people from or who have lived in Beechmont include:

- Greg Brough - 1968 Olympic medalist swimmer

== See also ==
- Lower Beechmont
- Beaudesert
- Canungra
