= Kokoda Barracks =

Coordinates: 28.0288°S 153.1821°E

Kokoda Barracks is an Australian Army base located in the Canungra Military Area near Witheren, Queensland. It is named after the Kokoda Track campaign during World War II.

== Geography ==
The base is in the upper Coomera River Valley between the Darlington Range and the Beechmont Range.

== History ==
The base was established in 1942 for Army jungle warfare and infantry training. It was closed from 1948 to 1954. It was in active use during the Vietnam War.

== Use ==
The Australian Army Intelligence Corps uses the facility for training. The Australian Army Land Warfare Centre, Canungra is located there. Due to be being used for training, it has a high transient population.

== See also ==
- List of Australian military bases
