= Witheren =

- Suburb
- Interactive map of Witheren
- Coordinates: 28.0363°S 153.1797°E
- Country: Australia
- State: Queensland
- LGA: Scenic Rim Region
- Location: 1.6 km (0.99 mi) SE of Canungra; 13.2 km (8.2 mi) S of Tamborine Mountain; 34.1 km (21.2 mi) E of Beaudesert; 75.2 km (46.7 mi) S of Brisbane

Government
  - State electorate: Scenic Rim
  - Federal division: Wright

Area
  - Total: 58.8 km^{2} (22.7 sq mi)

Population
  - Total: 581 (2021 census)
  - Density: 9.881/km^{2} (25.59/sq mi)
- Time zone: UTC+10:00 (AEST)
- Postcode: 4275
Suburbs around Witheren
Benobble	Tamborine Mountain	Clagiraba
Canungra	Witheren	Lower Beechmont
Sarabah; Ferny Glen	Flying Fox	Beechmont

Witheren is a rural locality in the Scenic Rim Region, Queensland, Australia. In the 2021 census, Witheren had a population of 581 people.

== Geography ==
The Coomera River flows through from south to north.

The Beaudesert Nerang Road (State Route 90) runs through from west to north.

== History ==
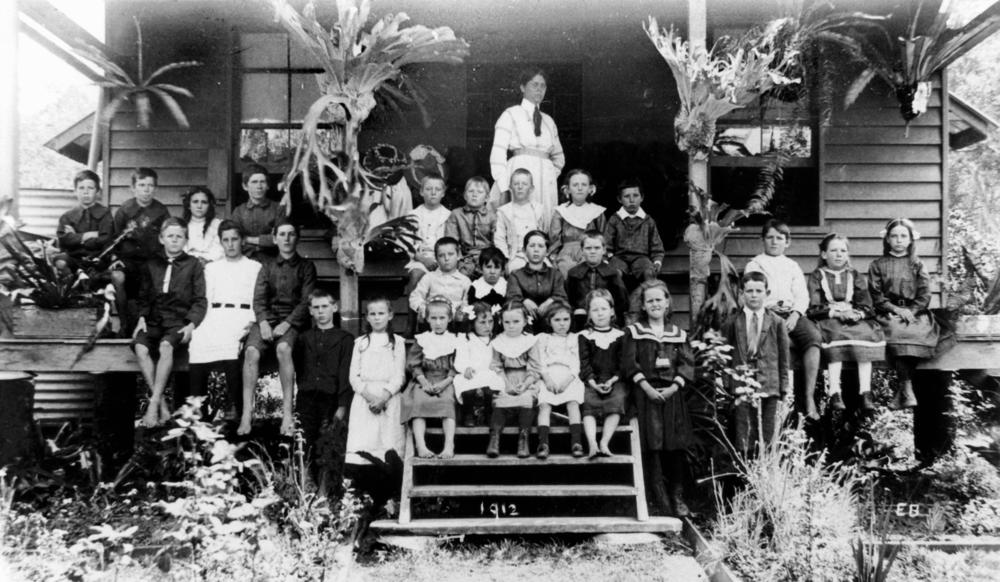
Witheren Provisional School, 1912

Witheren State School opened on 21 August 1899. In 1936 tenders were called for a new school building. The new school building was officially opened on Friday 4 June 1937 by the Minister for Public Instruction, Frank Cooper. The school closed on 9 May 1965. It was at 97 Upper Coomera Road (28.0515°S 153.1791°E). The school building has been converted to a private residence.

== Demographics ==
In the 2011 census, Witheren had a population of 441.

In the 2016 census, Witheren had a population of 496 people.

In the 2021 census, Witheren had a population of 581 people.

== Education ==
There are no schools in Witheren. The nearest government primary schools are Canungra State School in neighbouring Canungra to the west, St Bernard State School in neighbouring Tamborine Mountain to the north and Beechmont State School in neighbouring Beechmont to the south-east. The nearest government secondary schools are Tamborine Mountain State High School in neighbouring Tamborine Mountain to the north and Nerang State High School in Nerang to the east.
