= Nindooinbah, Queensland =

Nindooinbah
- Suburb
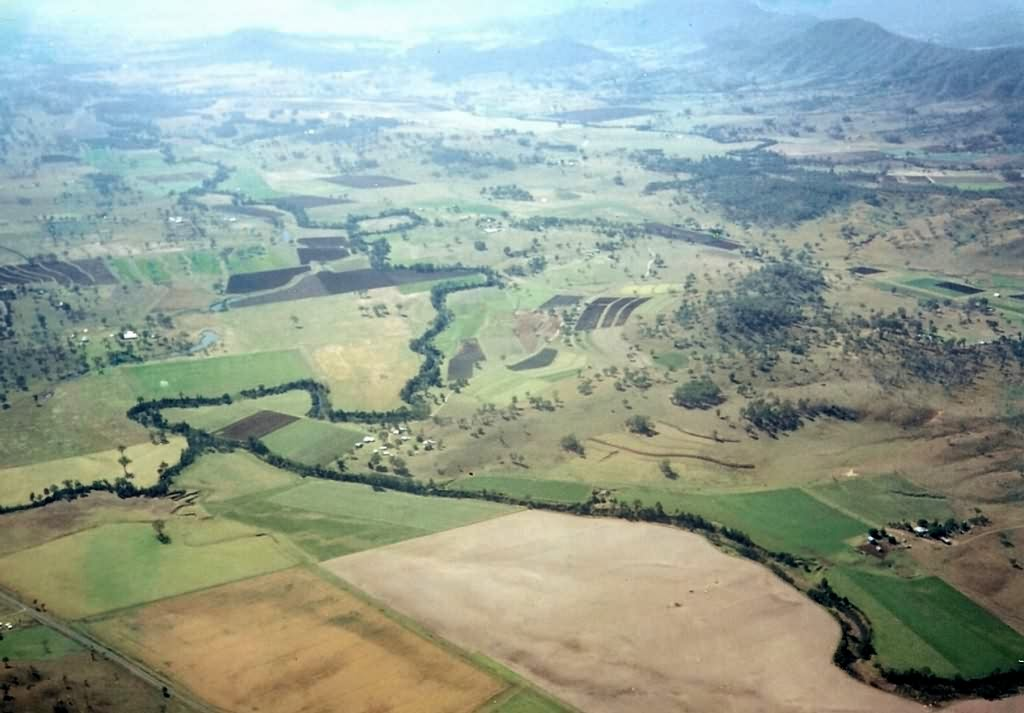
- Cainbable Creek meets the Albert River

- Interactive map of Nindooinbah
- Coordinates: 28.0505°S 153.0727°E
- Country: Australia
- State: Queensland
- LGA: Scenic Rim Region
- Location: 12.2 km (7.6 mi) SSE of Beaudesert; 80.8 km (50.2 mi) SW of Brisbane

Government
  - State electorate: Scenic Rim
  - Federal division: Wright

Area
  - Total: 54.8 km^{2} (21.2 sq mi)

Population
  - Total: 95 (2021 census)
  - Density: 1.734/km^{2} (4.490/sq mi)
- Time zone: UTC+10:00 (AEST)
- Postcode: 4285
Suburbs around Nindooinbah
| Beaudesert | Tabragalba; Biddaddaba | Canungra |
| Kerry | Nindooinbah | Canungra |
| Kerry | Cainbable | Sarabah |

Nindooinbah is a rural locality in the Scenic Rim Region, Queensland, Australia. In the 2021 census, Nindooinbah had a population of 95 people.

== Geography ==
Nindooinbah occupies a part of the upper Albert River valley where Cainbable Creek joins the river. The Albert River also marks portions of both the eastern and western borders. In the east of the locality the slopes of Mount Witheren reach more than 550 metres (1,800 ft) above sea level. Farming dominates the lower central areas along two main roads aligned in a north–south direction.

The locality is bounded to the east by the Canungra Range. Mount Witheren is part of the range on the north-eastern boundary of the locality (28.0517°S 153.1042°E), rising to 568 metres (1,864 ft) above sea level It is also known by its Yugumbir name Bingingerra. In Aboriginal lore, the mountain represents the body of turtle Bingingerra, who died on that location after a battle with sea creatures.

== History ==
The name Nindooinbah (also spelled Nindooimbah) is derived from the name of Nindooinbah pastoral run of 1842/3, based on Aboriginal words: nguin meaning charcoal / cinders, doan meaning black' and ba meaning place, indicating the place of the remains of a fire.

The Nindooimbah pastoral run was originally selected in the early 1840s by Alfred Compigne, and was subsequently purchased by William Duckett White. The White family variously owned and leased the whole of the land from the present town of Beaudesert as well as a large proportion of the land running from Beaudesert to the shores of the Pacific Ocean, in the neighbourhood of Nerang, Southport, and Coomera. This large land holding was cut up into smaller properties. In 1877, 12,000 acres (4,900 ha) was resumed from the Nooininbah and Kerrylarabah pastoral runs and offered for selection on 17 April 1877. Eventually Nindooimbah was reduced to an area of about 18,000 acres (7,300 ha; 73 km^{2}), of which a further 9,500 acres (3,800 ha; 38 km^{2}) was sold to William Collins.

On 7 May 1906 at Beaudesert School of Arts, auctioneers Isles, Love & Co offered 26 dairy farms, ranging in area from 118 to 1,223 acres (48 to 495 ha; 0.48 to 4.95 km^{2}), totalling 6,092 acres (2,465 ha; 24.65 km^{2}) in the Nindooimbah Estate along the Albert River and Kerry Creek (in present-day southern Nindooinbah and northern Kerry). The section for sale was known as the Kerry Paddocks, which have been subdivided into twenty-six dairy farms.

Nindooinbah State School opened on 12 May 1913. It closed on 24 January 1965. It was at 540 Nindooinbah Estate Road (28.07461°S 153.04834°E).

== Demographics ==
In the 2016 census, Nindooinbah had a population of 80 people.

In the 2021 census, Nindooinbah had a population of 95 people.

== Heritage listings ==
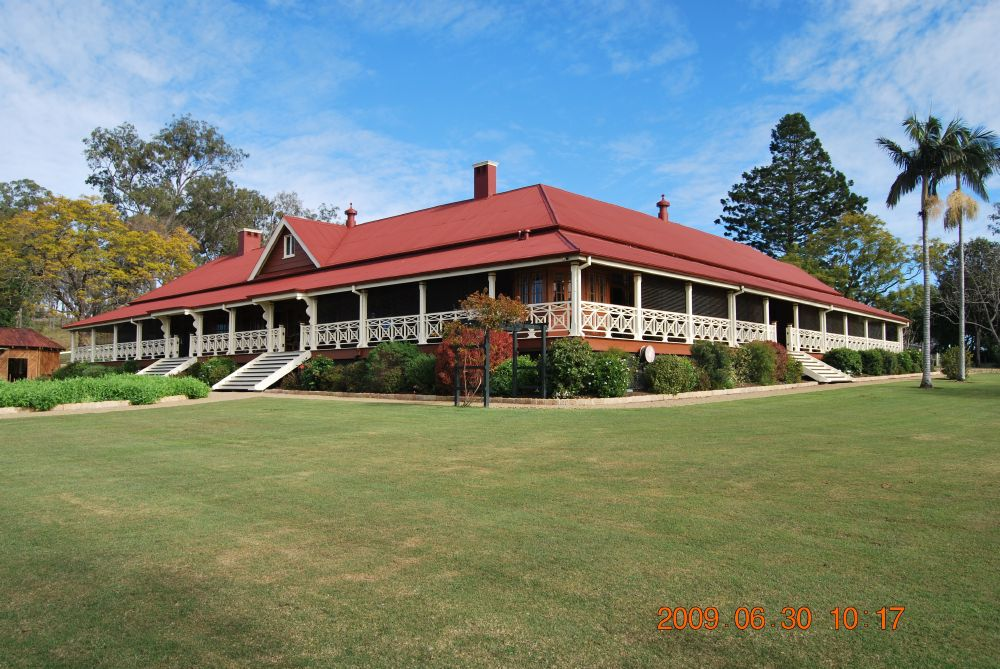
Nindooinbah Homestead, 2009

Nindooinbah has a number of heritage-listed sites, including:

- Nindooinbah Homestead, Nindooinbah Connection Road (28.0252°S 153.0514°E)

== Education ==
There are no schools in Nindooinbah. The nearest government primary schools are Beaudesert State School in neighbouring Beaudesert to the north-west, Canungra State School in neighbouring Canungra to the north-east, and Darlington State School in Darlington to the south. The nearest government secondary schools are Beaudesert State High School in neighbouring Beaudesert to the north-west and Tamborine Mountain State High School in Tamborine Mountain to the north-east.
