= Binna Burra, Queensland =

Binna Burra
- Suburb
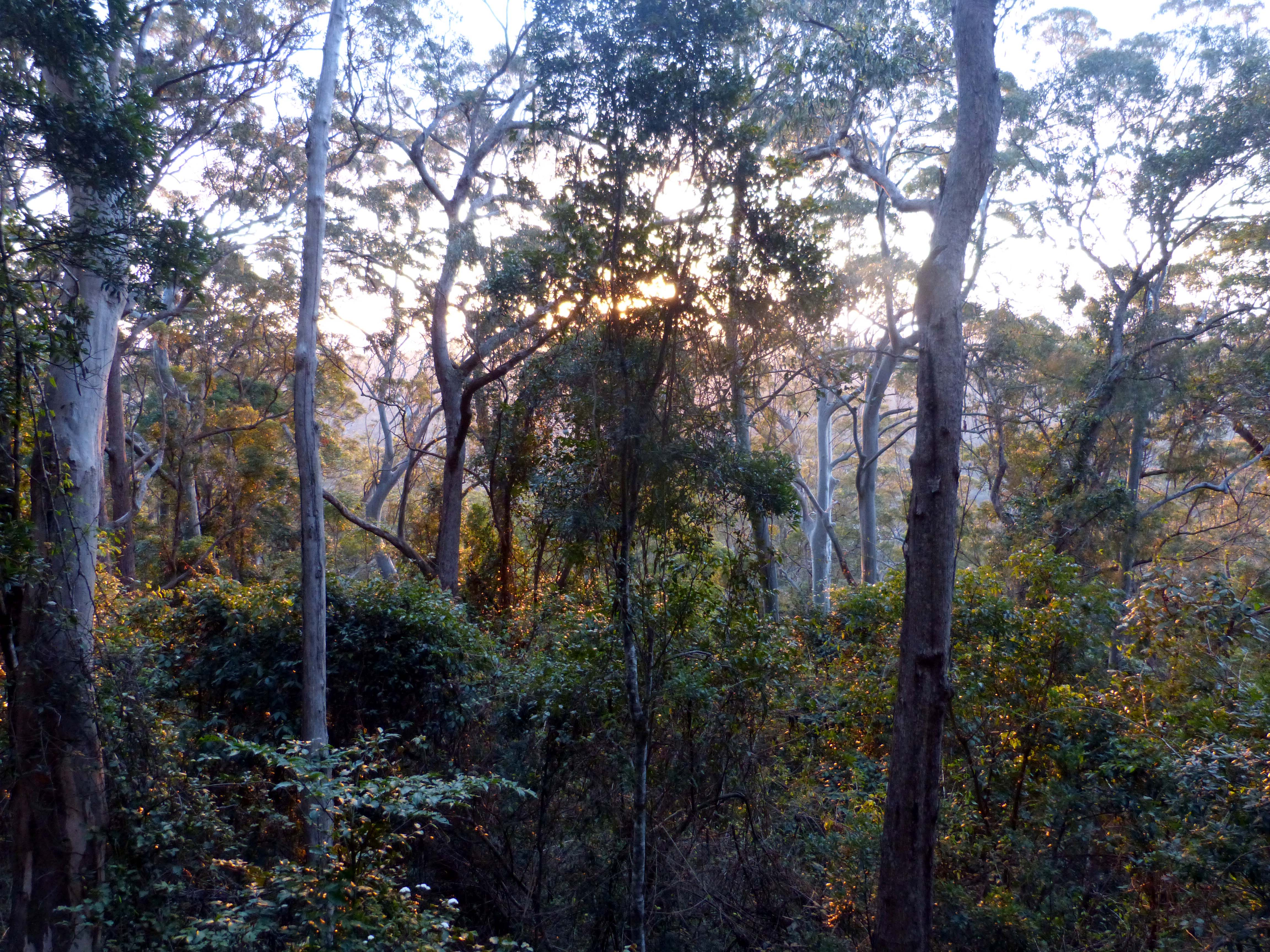
- Binna Burra rainforest at sunset, 2014

- Interactive map of Binna Burra
- Coordinates: 28.2030°S 153.1822°E
- Country: Australia
- State: Queensland
- LGA: Scenic Rim Region
- Location: 11.6 km (7.2 mi) S of Beechmont; 27.9 km (17.3 mi) S of Canungra; 34.8 km (21.6 mi) SW of Nerang; 53.8 km (33.4 mi) SE of Beaudesert; 105 km (65 mi) S of Brisbane

Government
  - State electorate: Scenic Rim
  - Federal division: Wright

Area
  - Total: 24.4 km^{2} (9.4 sq mi)

Population
  - Total: 0 (2021 census)
  - Density: 0.000/km^{2} (0.00/sq mi)
- Time zone: UTC+10:00 (AEST)
- Postcode: 4211
Suburbs around Binna Burra
O'Reilly	Illinbah	Beechmont
O'Reilly	Binna Burra	Natural Bridge
O'Reilly	Limpinwood (NSW)	Natural Bridge

Binna Burra is a rural locality in the Scenic Rim Region, Queensland, Australia. It borders New South Wales. In the 2021 census, Binna Burra had "no people or a very low population".

== Geography ==
The locality is a long thin valley bounded by the ridge of the Darlington Range to the west and the ridge of the Beechmont Range to the east. It is bounded to the south by the border between Queensland and New South Wales. The Coomera River rises in the far south of the locality (28.2559°S 153.2015°E) and flows north along the valley and exits the locality to the north (Illanbah).

The locality is almost entirely within the Lamington National Park, except for a small area on the eastern edge of the locality where the Binna Burra Lodge is located (28.1939°S 153.1871°E), providing accommodation within the national park for tourists.

== Demographics ==
In the 2016 census, Binna Burra had a population of 4 people.

In the 2021 census, Binna Burra had "no people or a very low population".

== Education ==
There are no schools in Binna Burra. The nearest government primary school is Beechmont State School in neighbouring Beechmont. The nearest government secondary school is Nerang State High School in Nerang.
