= Sarabah, Queensland =

Sarabah
- Suburb
- Interactive map of Sarabah
- Coordinates: 28.1188°S 153.1202°E
- Country: Australia
- State: Queensland
- LGA: Scenic Rim Region
- Location: 10.9 km (6.8 mi) SW of Canungra; 24.1 km (15.0 mi) SSW of Tamborine Mountain; 43.8 km (27.2 mi) SE of Beaudesert; 88.1 km (54.7 mi) S of Brisbane

Government
  - State electorate: Scenic Rim
  - Federal division: Wright

Area
  - Total: 23.0 km^{2} (8.9 sq mi)

Population
  - Total: 68 (2021 census)
  - Density: 2.957/km^{2} (7.66/sq mi)
- Time zone: UTC+10:00 (AEST)
- Postcode: 4275
Suburbs around Sarabah
Nindooinbah	Canungra	Ferny Glen
Nindooinbah	Sarabah	Illinbah
Cainbable	O'Reilly	Illinbah

Sarabah is a locality in the Scenic Rim Region, Queensland, Australia. In the 2021 census, Sarabah had a population of 68 people.

== Geography ==
The locality is bounded to the west by the Sarabah Range and to the east by the Darlington Range with a valley in-between. Canungra Creek enters the locality from the south (O'Reilly) and forms part of the south-eastern boundary before flowing north through the valley and exiting to the north (Canungra). The elevations range from 150 to 700 metres (490 to 2,300 ft) above sea level.

A section of Lamington National Park is in the south-west of the locality. Apart from this protected area, the land use of the locality is predominantly grazing on native vegetation.

There are two roads through the locality. Lamington National Park Road enters the locality from the north (Canungra) and loosely follows the western boundary of the locality (the Sarabah Range) before entering the locality's section of Lamington National Park, from which the road exits to the south-west (Cainbable). The other road, Sarabah Road, also enters from Canungra and travels along the valley floor (crossing the creek from time to time) providing access to the homes and farms, before exiting to the south-east (Illinbah).

== History ==
Sarabah Provisional School opened on 6 June 1892 and closed in June 1899.

== Demographics ==
In the 2016 census, Sarabah had a population of 55 people. The locality contains 25 households, in which 48.0% of the population are males and 52.0% of the population are females. The population's media age of 56 is 18 years above the national average. The average weekly household income is $1,437, $1 below the national average.

In the 2021 census, Sarabah had a population of 68 people.

== Education ==
There are no schools in Sarabah. The nearest government primary school is Canungra State School in neighbouring Canungra to the north. The nearest government secondary school is Tamborine Mountain State High School in Tamborine Mountain to the north-east.
