= Coomera Falls =

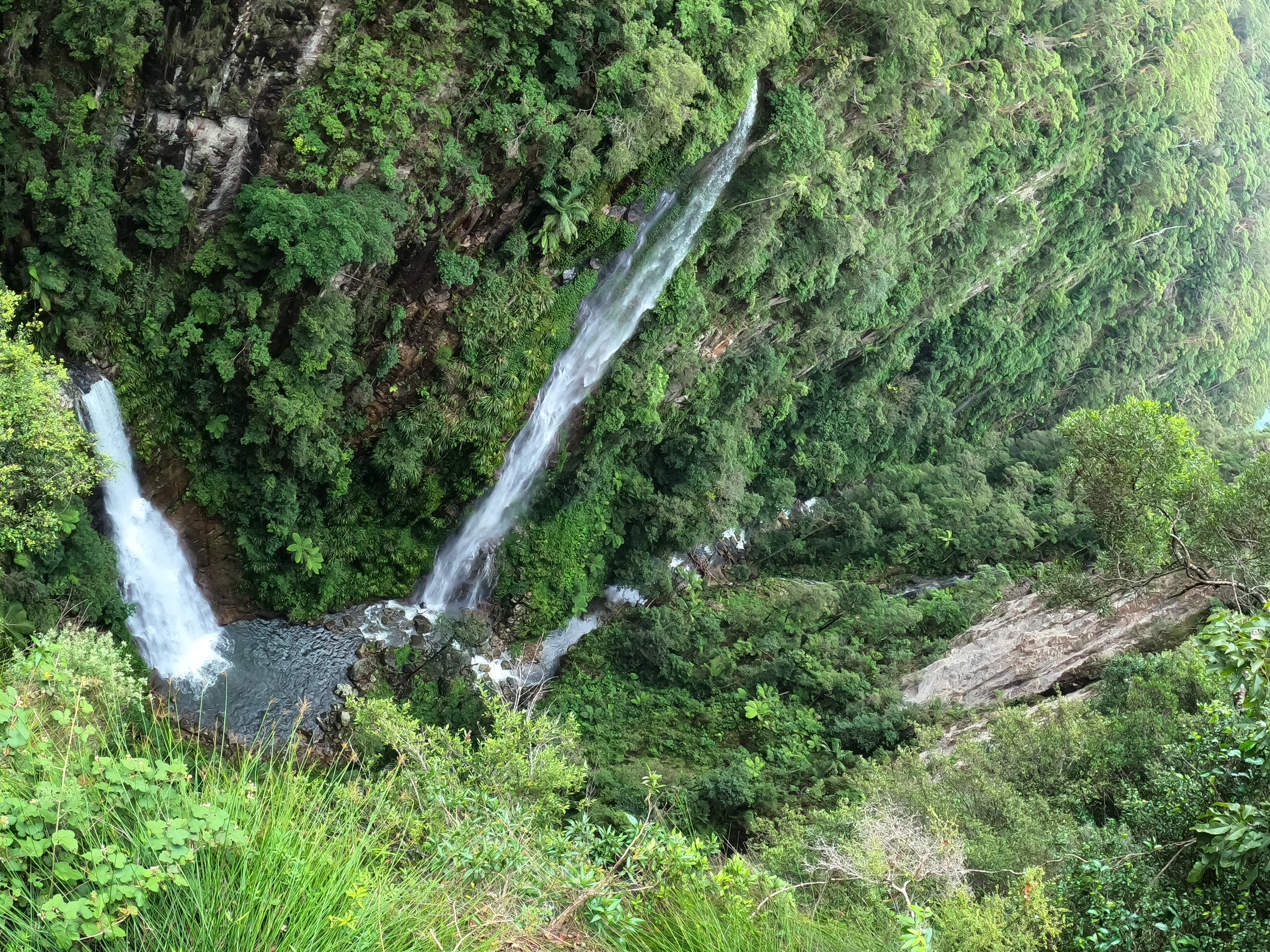
- Coomera Falls from above, 2021

- Location within Queensland
- Location: South East Queensland, Australia
- Coordinates: 28.232785°S 153.190573°E
- Type: Segmented
- Total height: 64 metres (210 ft)
- Number of drops: 2
- Watercourse: Coomera River

The Coomera Falls is a segmented waterfall on the upper Coomera River in the South East region of Queensland, Australia.

== Location and features ==
The Coomera Falls are situated within the locality of Binna Burra in the Lamington National Park, approximately 3 kilometres (1.9 mi) north of the Queensland/New South Wales border. Located to the west of the Border Track, the falls descend 64 metres (210 ft) into Coomera Gorge. Access is via graded walking tracks in Lamington National Park that commence from Binna Burra. Also located in close proximity to the falls are the Bahnamboola Falls and the Neerigomindalala Falls.

The Coomera Circuit, a 17.5-kilometre (10.9 mi) walking track within the national park that provides ideal viewing of the falls, was rated in 2010 by the Australian Geographic Outdoor magazine as the second best day walk in Australia.

== See also ==
- List of waterfalls
- List of waterfalls in Australia
