= Oakey Creek (Queensland) =

Stream in Queensland, Australia

Coordinates: 27.856699°S 153.343288°E

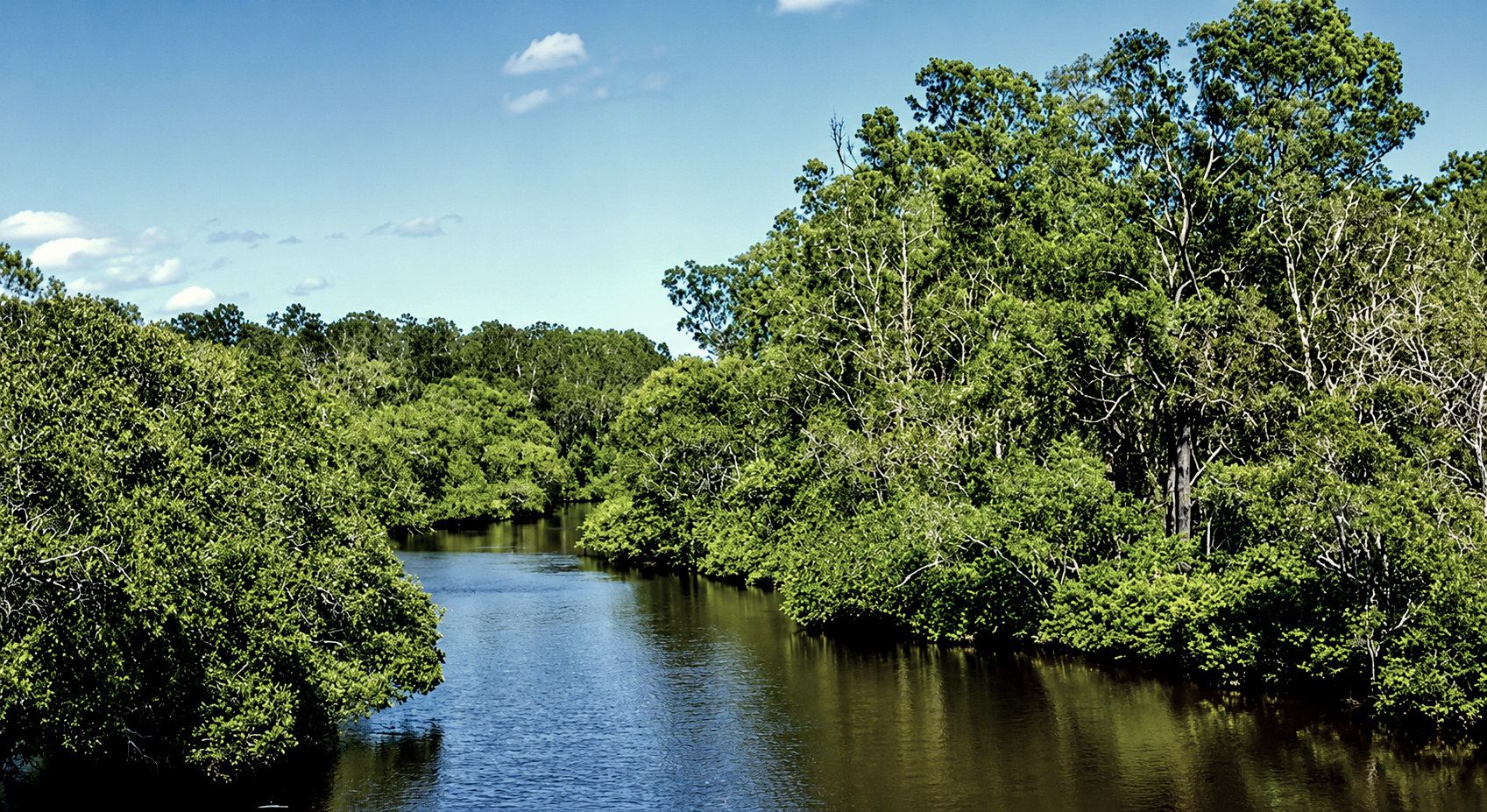
- The creek flowing through Coomera, just northwest of Dreamworld

- Location in Queensland

Location
- Country: Australia
- State: Queensland
- Region: South East Queensland
- Local government area: City of Gold Coast

Physical characteristics
- Mouth: Coomera River
  - location: Coomera, Queensland

Basin features
- River system: Coomera River

Oakey Creek is a stream in the City of Gold Coast, Queensland, Australia. It is a tributary of the Coomera River, joining the river within the lower Coomera River catchment near Coomera.

== Course ==
Oakey Creek rises in the northern Gold Coast urban area before flowing eastwards through Coomera, where it enters the Coomera River. The creek forms part of the lower Coomera River catchment and contributes to the river's estuarine system.

== Environment ==
Oakey Creek forms part of the Coomera River catchment, which contains remnant wetlands, riparian vegetation and tidal waterways that provide habitat for native flora and fauna. Water quality and ecological condition within the catchment are monitored by the Queensland Government and the City of Gold Coast. The creek retains relatively good riparian condition, although freshwater fish and macroinvertebrate diversity is low. Extensive urban development in the upper catchment has adversely affected the creek's ecological health.

=== Dreamworld ===
Oakey Creek flows immediately north of Dreamworld, with the original Big Brother house situated on the opposite side of the creek. During the original Network 10 and Nine series, housemates crossed the creek via a pedestrian bridge when making their way to the live eviction auditorium. The creek also forms part of the Dreamworld Corroboree's Kakadu Wetlands exhibit before continuing east towards the Coomera River.

== See also ==
- List of rivers of Australia § Queensland
