= Glow-Worm Caves Tamborine Mountain =

Coordinates: 27°56′11.49″S 153°11′23.04″E

Glow-Worm Caves Tamborine Mountain is a tourist attraction at Tamborine Mountain in South-East Queensland, Australia.

The Glow Worm Caves at Cedar Creek Estate Vineyard and Winery, is a purpose built cave in which the local Queensland glow-worms Arachnocampa flava have been introduced. The caves are in a naturalistic style, with stalactites, stalagmites, and flowstone features (all man-made again).

Construction of the cave was completed in 2004 and glowworms introduced in September that year, ready for the October breeding season, with the caves opening to visitors in March 2005. It's envisaged that the colony will become self-sufficient. Insects for the glowworms are caught by daily sweep netting of the grounds and through buckets filled with rotten fruit that attract fruit flies. Humidity and moisture are controlled with a high-pressure misting system that is run every two hours, however, no other temperature control is utilised.

Tours consist of a seven-minute DVD (available in English, Mandarin, Japanese and Korean), photo opportunities in front of the stalactites and stalagmites, and finally a 15-minute tour through "glow worm alley". Visitors are able to see the glow worms under a red torchlight, and have access to a fully knowledgeable tour guide.

Tickets are available from the glow worm office, located outside cellar door, along with sweets, shirts, bookmarks, magnets amongst other merchandise.
