= Darlington Range =

Mountain Range in Queensland, Australia

Coordinates: 27°50′S 153°13′E

The Darlington Range is a mountain range in South East Queensland, Australia. It stretches from Green Mountains in the south, to Mount Stapylton in the north. Notable mountains located within the range include: Pyramid Rock (678m), Laheys Tabletop (663m), Tamborine Mountain (572m), Hendersons Knob (572m), The Knoll (555m), Mount Wongawallan (377m), Davis Hill (298m), and Mount Stapylton (152m).
