= Canungra, Queensland =

Canungra
- Town
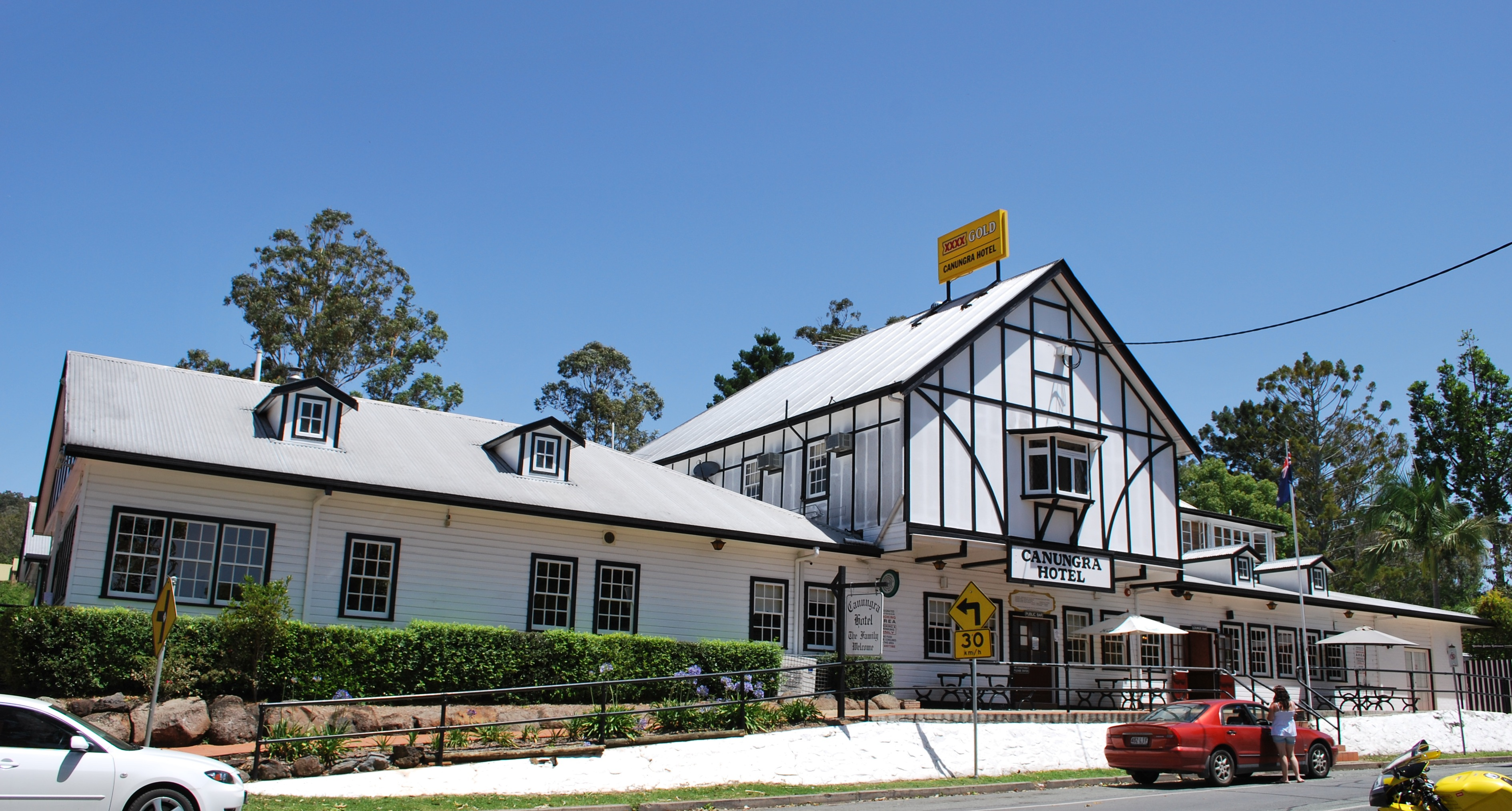
- The historic Canungra Hotel

- Interactive map of Canungra
- Coordinates: 28.0195°S 153.1652°E
- Country: Australia
- State: Queensland
- LGA: Scenic Rim Region
- Location: 13.2 km (8.2 mi) S of Tamborine Mountain; 26.2 km (16.3 mi) E of Beaudesert; 77.2 km (48.0 mi) S of Brisbane CBD

Government
  - State electorate: Scenic Rim
  - Federal division: Wright

Area
  - Total: 29.8 km^{2} (11.5 sq mi)

Population
  - Total: 1,436 (2021 census)
  - Density: 48.19/km^{2} (124.81/sq mi)
- Time zone: UTC+10:00 (AEST)
- Postcode: 4275
Localities around Canungra
Biddaddabba	Benobble	Witheren
Nindooinbah	Canungra	Witheren
Nindooinbah	Sarabah	Witheren

Canungra /kəˈnʌŋɡrə/ is a rural town and locality in the Scenic Rim Region of South East Queensland, Australia. In the 2021 census, Canungra had a population of 1,436 people.

== Geography ==
Located in South East Queensland, Canungra is situated in the Gold Coast hinterland, 32 kilometres (20 mi) west of the Gold Coast and 75 kilometres (47 mi) south of Brisbane.

Mount Misery is on the north-western boundary of the locality with Biddadaba (28.0145°S 153.1398°E) rising to 530 metres (1,740 ft) above sea level.

Residents and businesses in Canungra get their water supply from the Canungra Creek, a tributary of the Albert River. The slopes around Canungra are steep and forested, with some cleared farmlands and rural homes in the flatter valley areas.

== History ==
Nicknamed the "Valley of the Owls", one of the origins of the town's name comes from the Aboriginal word for small owls, "Caningera". The most notable owl found in the area is the Australian boobook owl, which appears in various logos and symbols associated with Canungra. However the word Cunungra comes from the Yugambeh word gungunga meaning "a long flat or clearing".

Canungra owes its existence to the timber industry and once boasted one of the largest stands of timber in the colony. David Lahey, the father of Romeo Lahey, owned one of Queensland's largest sawmills at Canungra (Lahey's Canungra Sawmill).

Canungera Upper Provisional School opened on 21 January 1889 for the children of settlers and sawmill workers. It operated in the School of Arts Hall on the western side of the creek. In 1899, following problems with the termites, the School of Arts Hall was relocated to its current site in Pine Street, where it continued to be used by the school for a short time until land in Finch Street was purchased from Mrs Duncan and the school relocated to that site. On 1 January 1909, it became Canungera Upper State School. In 1912, the name was changed to Canungra State School. In 1962, the school relocated to its present location, which was formerly occupied by the Franklin sawmill and the Canunga railway station and rail yards.

In 1900, a Baptist church was opened in Canungra.

Canungra Post Office was opened by May 1907 (a receiving office had been open from 1888 under the ownership of Mrs. John Duncan, known at first as Canningera Creek).

From 2 July 1915 until 1 July 1955, the Canungra railway line ran from the Beaudesert line at Logan Village to Canungra railway station (28.0179°S 153.1625°E).

In 1916, the Lahey family built the Bellissima guest house. In 1927 it was sold and extended to become the Canungra Hotel. In 1937 the hotel burned down and rebuilt as the current Canungra Hotel.

On 1 May 1916, at the Canungra School of Arts auctioneers Isles, Love & Co offered for sale 107 town lots (30 of them with a cottage) in the Cunungra Township Estate in Pine Street, Duncan Street, Appel Street, Kidston Street, Franklin Street, Tamborine Street, Strachan Street and King Street (approx 28.0197°S 153.166161°E) to the immediate south-east of the Canungra railway station. On the following day 2 May 1916, 30 farm lots were offered. Some of these lots were located to the west of Canungra Creek from the immediate south-west of the town through to the north almost to Benobble railway station. The bulk of the farm lots were to the west of Canungra Creek extending south of the town but bounded to the east by Coomera River. Many of the blocks were sold.

On Sunday 12 November 1933, Archbishop James Duhig laid the foundation stone for St Mary Margaret's Catholic Church, following a fund-raising campaign that commenced in 1929. On 24 June 1934 Duhig returned to officially open the church in the presence of over 800 people. The church building was designed by J. P. (Jack) Donaghue and erected by B. Robertson.

On 18 October 1936, St Luke's Church of England was officially opened and dedicated by Archbishop William Wand. The building was designed by architect Raymond Clare Nowland and the contractor was Gordon Rhodes, supervised by architect Thomas Percy. It was built in the Old English Gothic style using rose cedar.

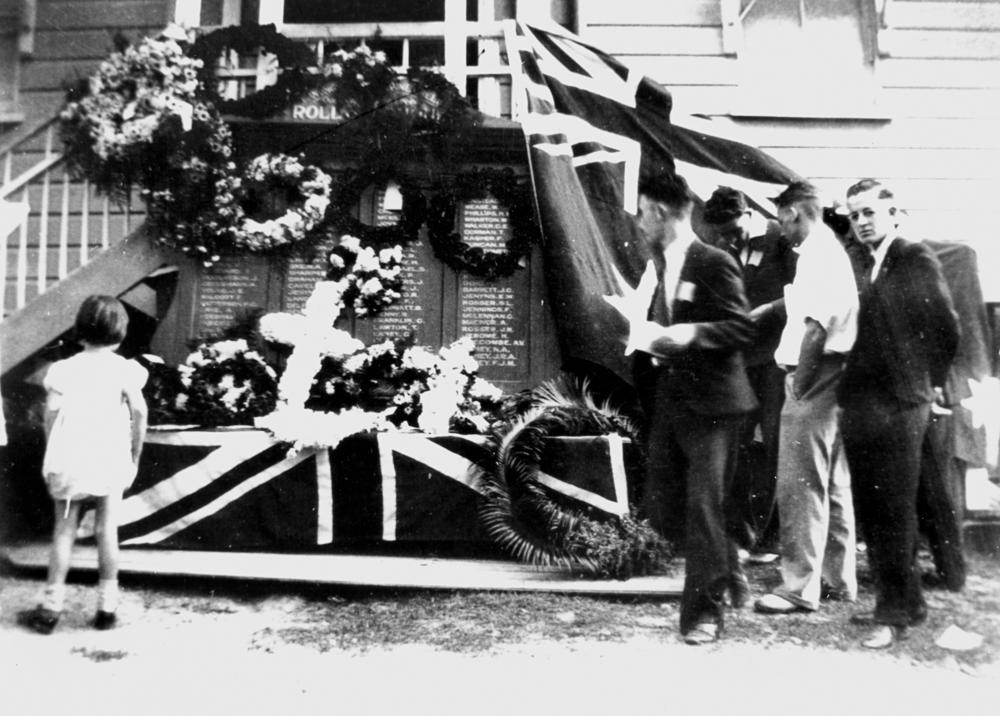
Honour Board at the School of Arts, Anzac Day 1937

The Honour Board at the School of Arts Hall was unveiled by the Queensland Governor, Sir Matthew Nathan, on 17 June 1922. The School of Arts burned down on 3 March 1946.

On 25 April 1938, the Canungra War Memorial was unveiled by Member of the Queensland Legislative Assembly for Fassifern, Adolph Gustav Muller.

By the 1940s, most of the timber had been cut and sawmills were closing. The historic Laheys Tramway Tunnel is the only remnant of the past sawmilling activities in the area. Following this logging era came beef cattle and dairying.

During World War II, Stuartholme School in Brisbane was taken over for use as the United States Army 42nd General Hospital. The students were relocated initially to the Canungra Hotel. After Camp Cable was established at Mount Tamborine, the students were relocated to the Grand Hotel in Southport.

On Saturday 5 June 1954, the Canungra Methodist Memorial Church was officially opened by the Reverend George Edwin Holland, the President of the Methodist Conference of Queensland. The church cost £1500 to build, reusing timber and fittings from the Methodist Church at Wonglepong which was demolished in late 1953 for this purpose. Following the amalgamation of the Methodist Church into the Uniting Church in Australia in 1977, the church became known as Canungra Uniting Church.

== Demographics ==
In the 2016 census, the locality of Canungra had a population of 1,229 people.

In the 2021 census, the locality of Canungra had a population of 1,436 people.

== Heritage listings ==
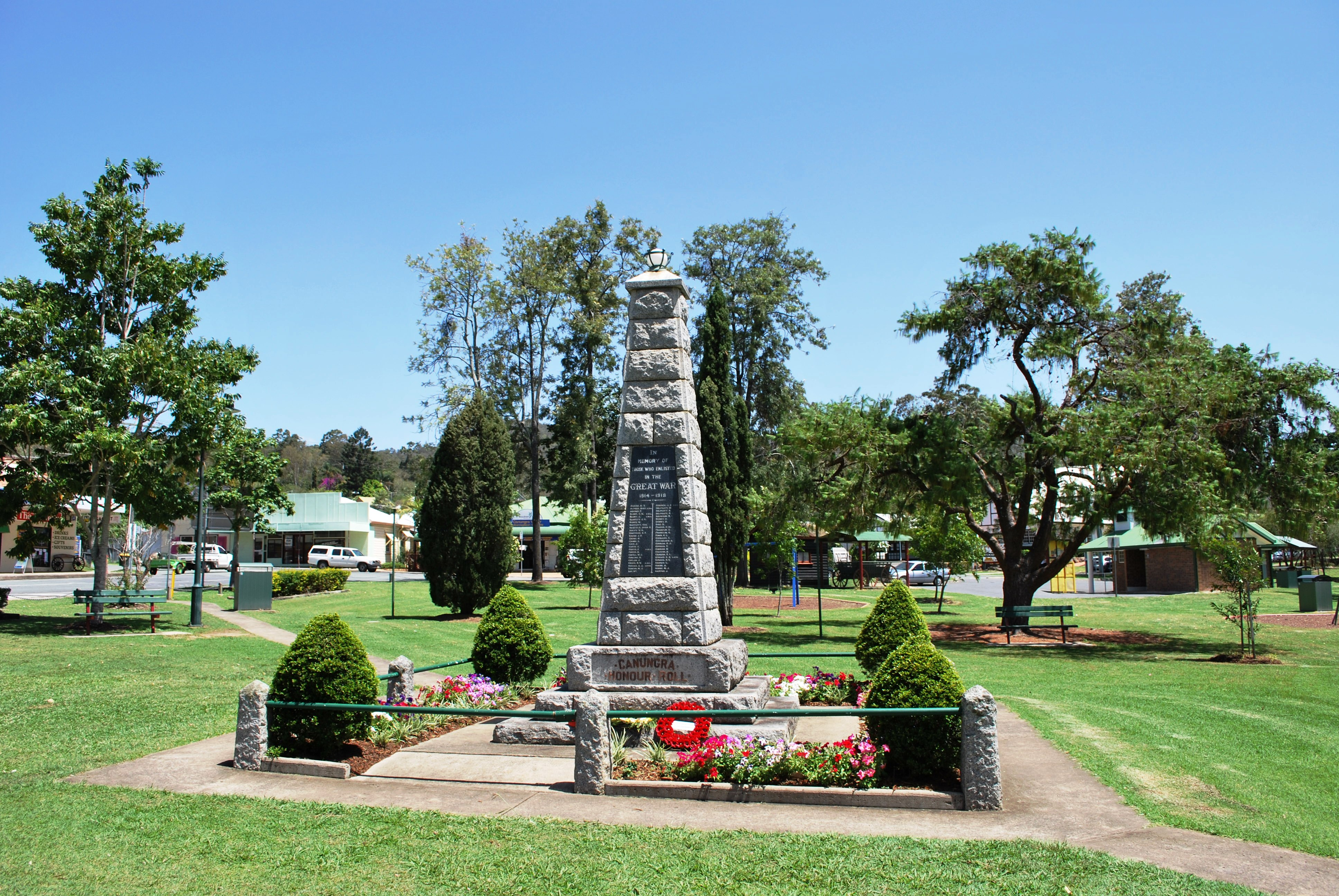
Canungra War Memorial, 2008

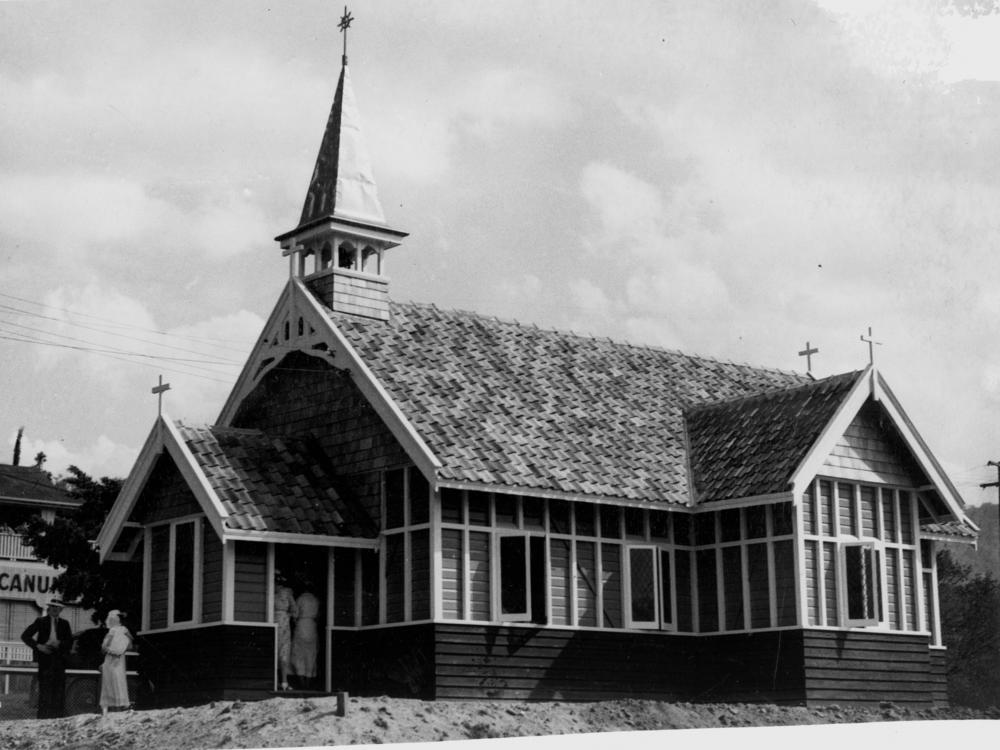
St Luke's Anglican Church

Canungra has a number of heritage-listed sites, including:

- former Canungra Ambulance Station, 13-15 Appel Street
- Uniting Church, 31 Appel Street
- Canungra War Memorial, 1-3 Christie Street
- Lahey's Canungra Tramway Tunnel, Darlington Range Road (28.0231°S 153.1718°E)
- Lahey's Canungra Sawmill, 10–26 Finch Road
- St Luke's Anglican Church, 15-21 Kidston Street
- Canungra Police Station Reserve, 33-41 Kidston Street
- St Margaret Mary's Catholic Church, 51-57 Kidston Street
- Canungra Sports and Recreation Ground (entry gates), Showground Road

== Economy ==
The town is home to a small but growing wine industry.

Cangungra's economy depends on tourism, being a popular destination for short drives from the Gold Coast and Brisbane. Canungra is nestled in the middle of the four major tourist destinations, and is the gateway to the Gold Coast hinterland; Mount Tamborine, Lamington National Park, O'Reilly's Guesthouse and Binna Burra Lodge. The township is also a meeting place for motor bike club rides, hang gliders, paragliders, birdwatchers and bushwalkers who visit the area annually to take advantage of what the Canungra Valley has to offer. A rodeo is organised each year in July.

== Military base ==
The nearby locality of Witheren is the location of a large military establishment called the Kokoda Barracks within the Canungra Military Area, which includes the Land Warfare Centre. It was established during World War II and revived in 1954 to train personnel for the South East Asia Treaty Organization (SEATO) commitment in Malaya and on through to the end of the Vietnam War. The base provides a substantial permanent resident population as well as an ever-changing transient population due to the extensive ongoing training courses on offer at the base.

== Education ==
Canungra State School is a government primary (Prep-6) school for boys and girls at 5-9 Christie Street (28.0169°S 153.1623°E). In 2018, the school had an enrolment of 346 students with 28 teachers (23 full-time equivalent) and 16 non-teaching staff (9 full-time equivalent). It includes a special education program.

There is no secondary school in Canungra. The nearest government secondary schools are Tamborine Mountain State High School in Tamborine Mountain to the north and Beaudesert State High School in Beaudesert to the west.

== Facilities ==
Canungra Police Station is at 33 Kidston Street (28.0195°S 153.1639°E).

Canungra Fire Station is at 3 Finch Street (28.0172°S 153.1658°E).

Canungra Ambulance Station is at 24 Christie Street (28.0166°S 153.1630°E).

Although historically in Canungra, Canungra Cemetery is on the corner of Beaudesert Nerang Road and Beechmont Road (28.0239°S 153.1771°E) in neighbouring Witheren.

== Amenities ==
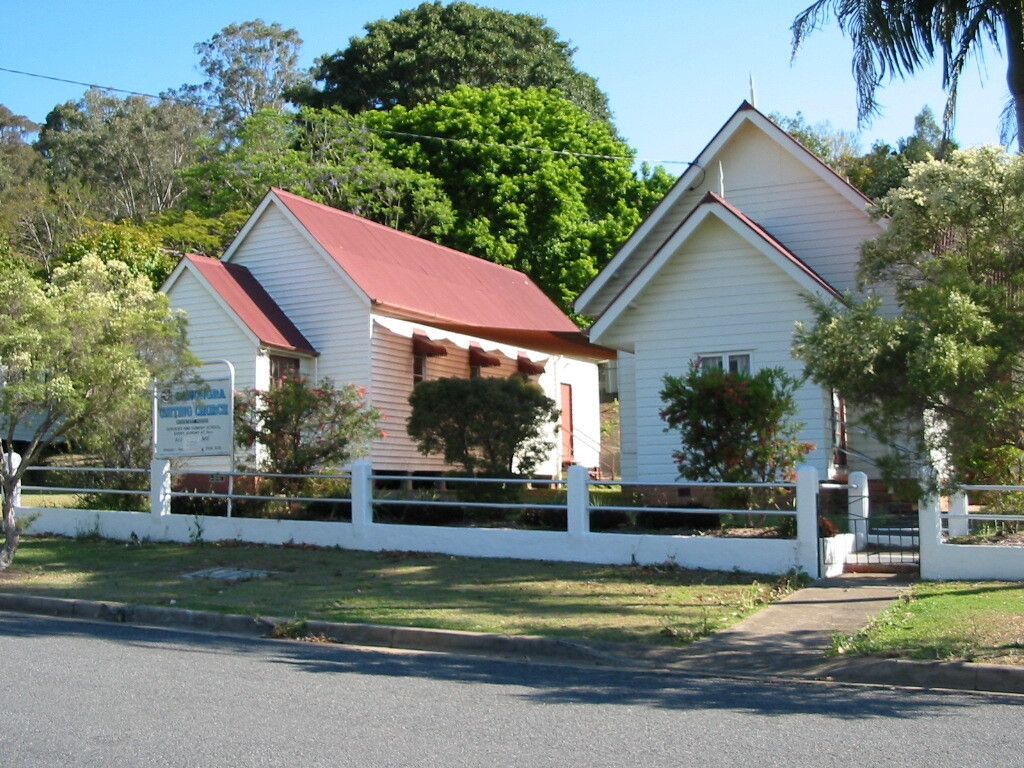
Canungra Uniting Church (former Canungra Methodist Memorial Church), 2005

The Scenic Rim Regional Council Library Service operates a branch library at 12 Kidston Street (28.0180°S 153.1644°E) and provides access to public wifi. Current opening hours and services can be found at the Scenic Rim Regional Council website. Available collections and online resources can be accessed from the online library catalogue.

The Canungra Hotel is at 18 Kidston Street (28.0186°S 153.1636°E). It offers accommodation, food and drink.

Canungra Bowls Club is a lawn bowls club at 18 Christie Street (28.0165°S 153.1624°E).

Canunga RSL is at 25-29 Pine Street (28.0189°S 153.1676°E). It provides meals and drinks, with funds raised going to support of Australian military veterans and their families.

St Luke's Anglican Church is at 15-21 Kidston Street (28.0182°S 153.1635°E). It is within the Anglican Parish of Tamborine Mountain.

St Mary Margaret's Catholic Church is at 51-57 Kidston Street (28.0206°S 153.1649°E).

Canungra Uniting Church is at 31 Appel Street (28.0200°S 153.1661°E).

There are a number of parks in the locality, including:

- D J Smith Park (28.0174°S 153.1643°E)
- Moriarty Park (28.0191°S 153.1592°E)

Moriatry Park is a community sports centre with facilities for tennis, soccer, cricket, swimming, netball, taekwondo, hang gliding, yoga and dog sports. The hall and grounds are also available for hire.

== In culture ==
In Redgum's No. 1 single "I Was Only Nineteen", Canungra is referred to as one of the bases used for training during the Vietnam War. The single was taken from Redgum's 1983 album Caught in the Act.

== Notable residents ==
- Des Bartlett, wildlife film maker, born in Canungra
- May Darlington Lahey (1889 - 1984), lawyer and judge, born in Canungra
- Robert Raymond, born in Canungra

== See also ==
- List of tramways in Queensland
