= Coomera River =

Coomera
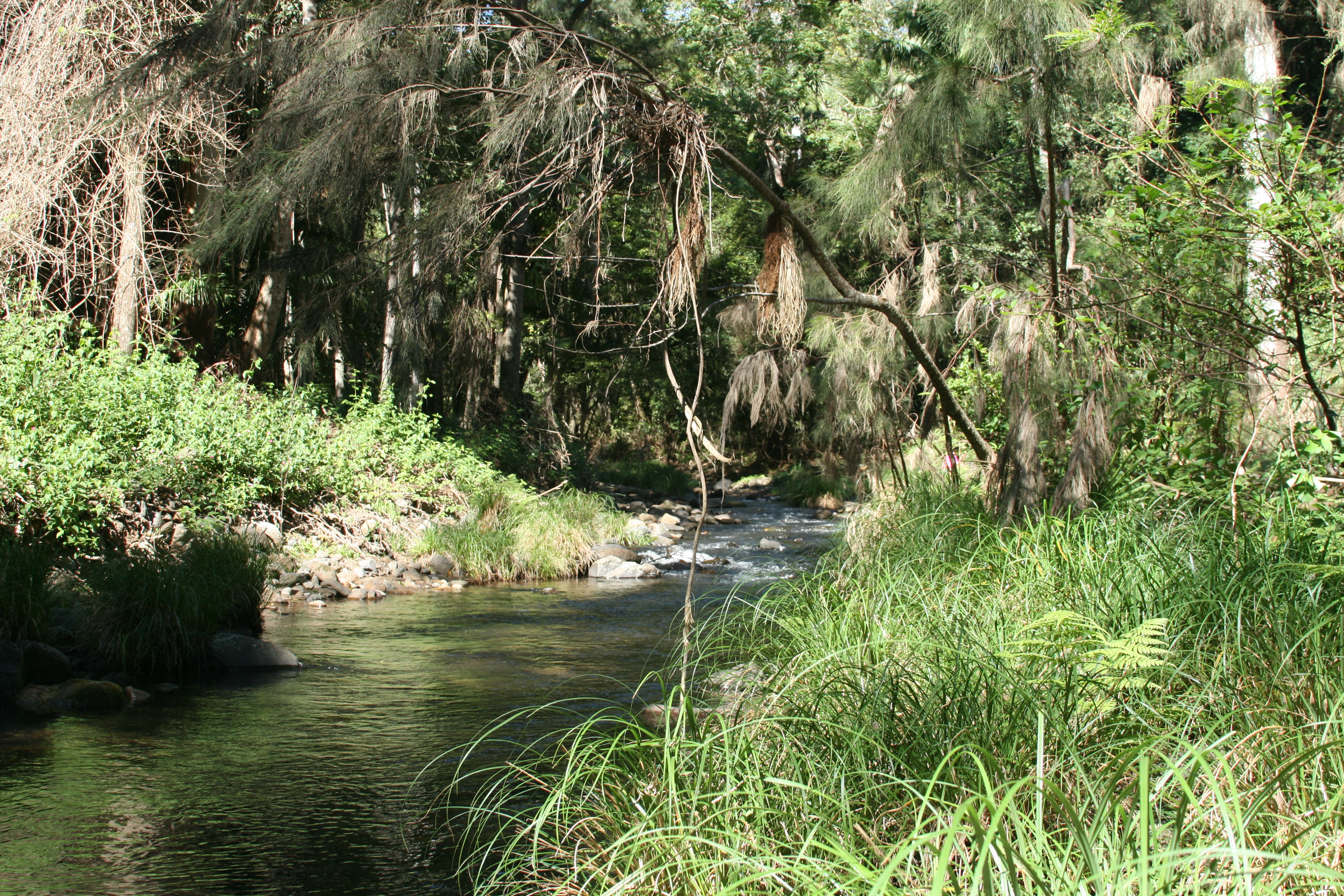
- Upper reaches of the Coomera River in Lamington National Park

- Location of Coomera River river mouth in Queensland
- Etymology: Aboriginal word kumera

Location
- Country: Australia
- State: Queensland
- Region: South East Queensland
- Local government areas: Scenic Rim Region, City of Gold Coast

Physical characteristics
- Source: McPherson Range, Great Dividing Range
  - location: Binna Burra
  - coordinates: 28°13′3″S 153°11′9″E
  - elevation: 524 m (1,719 ft)
- Mouth: Gold Coast Broadwater
  - location: Coomera (north branch), Paradise Point (south branch)
  - coordinates: 27°51′58″S 153°24′21″E
  - elevation: 0 m (0 ft)
- Length: 80 km (50 mi)
- Basin size: 489 km^{2} (189 sq mi)

Basin features
- Tributaries
  - left: Guanaba Creek, Wongawallan Creek, Baker Creek (Queensland), Bygon Creek, Yuan Creek, Oakey Creek, Coomera River (North Branch)
  - right: Back Creek (Queensland), Price Creek (Queensland), Saltwater Creek (Gold Coast, Queensland), Coombabah Creek
- National park: Lamington National Park

The Coomera River is a perennial river in the South East region of Queensland, Australia. Its catchment lies within the Gold Coast and Scenic Rim Region local government areas and covers an area of 489 square kilometres (189 sq mi).

== Course and features ==
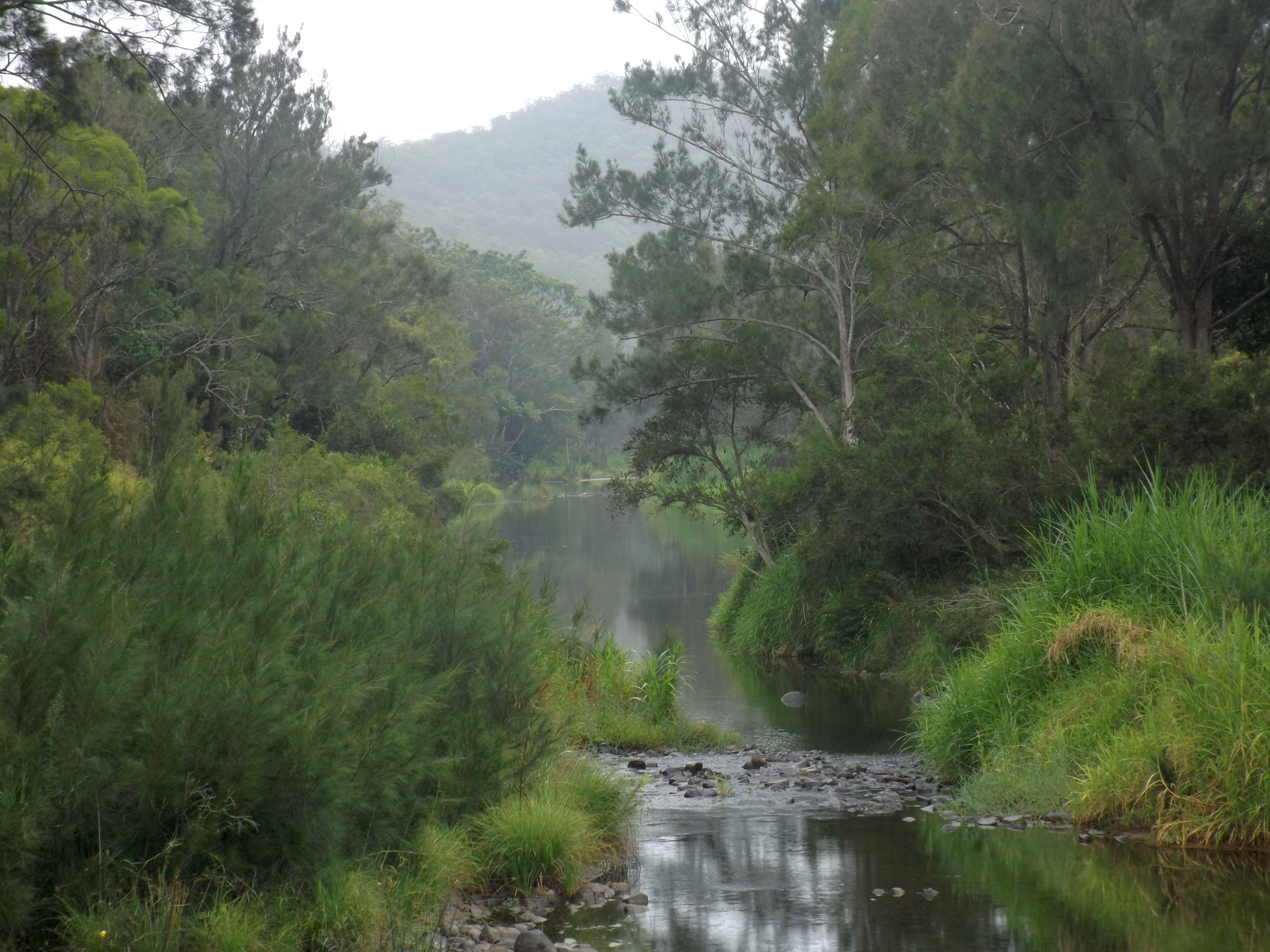
Clagiraba, 2016

Rising in Lamington National Park below the Lamington plateau in the locality of Binna Burra and a few kilometres north of the New South Wales/Queensland border, the Coomera River descends over the spectacular Coomera Falls in the Coomera Gorge. The river flows generally north through large rural properties in the upper reaches, joined by ten minor tributaries before flowing through high density residential and riverside development, particularly in the lower estuary where it flows into the Broadwater near Coomera Island and Paradise Point. Prior to reaching the Broadwater the river diverts into two streams to form the North Branch of the river that flows to the west and north of Coomera Island and heads towards Jumpinpin Channel to join the Pimpama River. The main course of the river flows south of Coomera Island which heads towards the Gold Coast Seaway including flowing around the Sovereign Islands and Hope Island. Further upstream, the river flows around Foxwell Island. This river is one of a number which flow north from the Tweed Valley shield volcano. Downstream the river flows between Coomera and Oxenford. The Coomera River then enters the northern tip of the Gold Coast Broadwater at Paradise Point. The river descends 524 metres (1,719 ft) over its 80-kilometre (50 mi) course.

The Coomera river catchment covers an area of 489 square kilometres (189 sq mi). The river's length is approximately 80 km. Freshwater parts reach mostly to a maximum of 1.5 metres (4 ft 11 in) but some parts at waterholes and below waterfalls can exceed 2 metres (6 ft 7 in).

The lower estuary area is a fast-growing residential area. Sanctuary Cove and Santa Barbara are all becoming home to increasing numbers of people. A former sand mine near the Pacific Motorway is being investigated for development of a rowing course.

The upper tidal areas are popular for waterskiing and wakeboarding. The upper Coomera River is home 18 regionally significant species including the platypus.

The river is crossed by the Pacific Motorway and the Gold Coast railway line between Upper Coomera and Oxenford. Further multiple road crossings of the river occur upstream.

As of 2023 The Gold Coast Waterways Authority is improving access and connections to the waterways by dredging the Coomera River navigation channel from Sovereign Island to the Gold Coast Marine Industry Precinct at Coomera. Approximately 70,000 cubic metres of sand will be removed.

== History ==
In May 1827 Patrick Logan was the first non-Indigenous person to discover the river. The waterway was originally named the Arrowsmith after a London cartographic firm by Robert Dixon, a government surveyor. However Thomas Mitchell, the Colonial Surveyor General, overruled this and other names, replacing them with Aboriginal names. It was also known as the Kumera Kumera.

The name Coomera comes from a Bundjalung language (Ngaraangbal dialect) word kumera referring to a wattle tree, whose bark was used to stupify fish.

== See also ==
- List of rivers of Australia § Queensland
