= Tamborine Mountain =

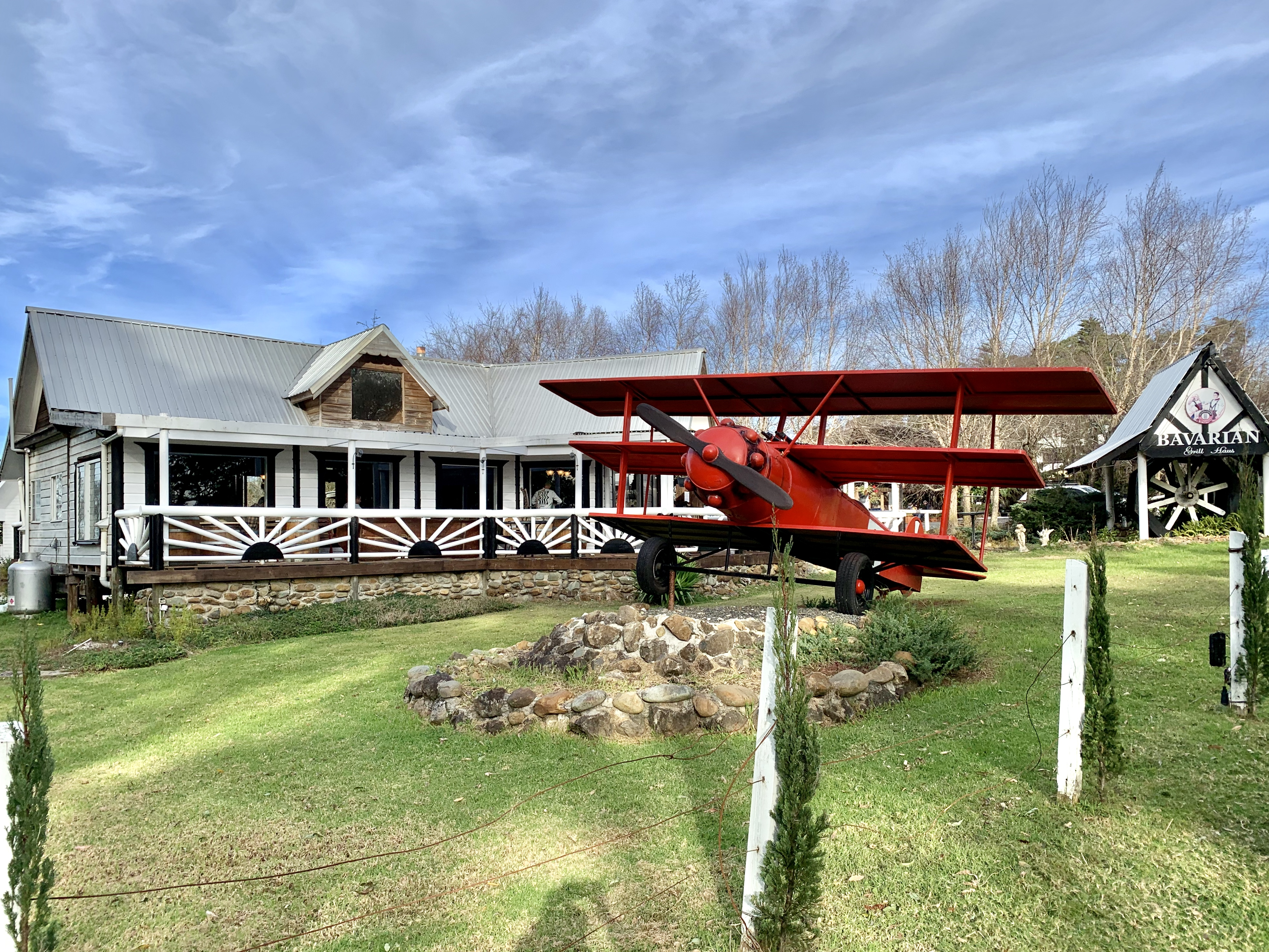
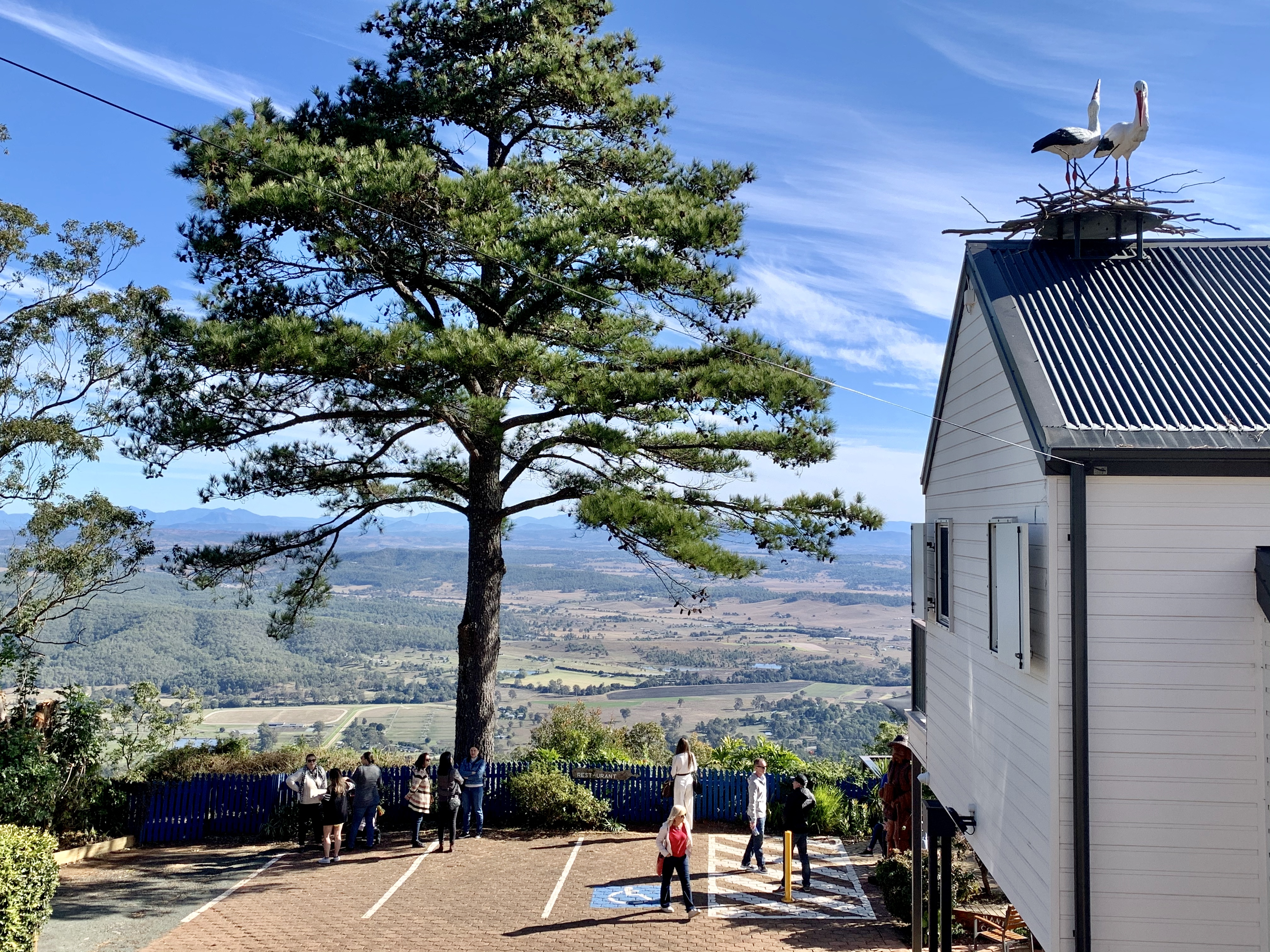
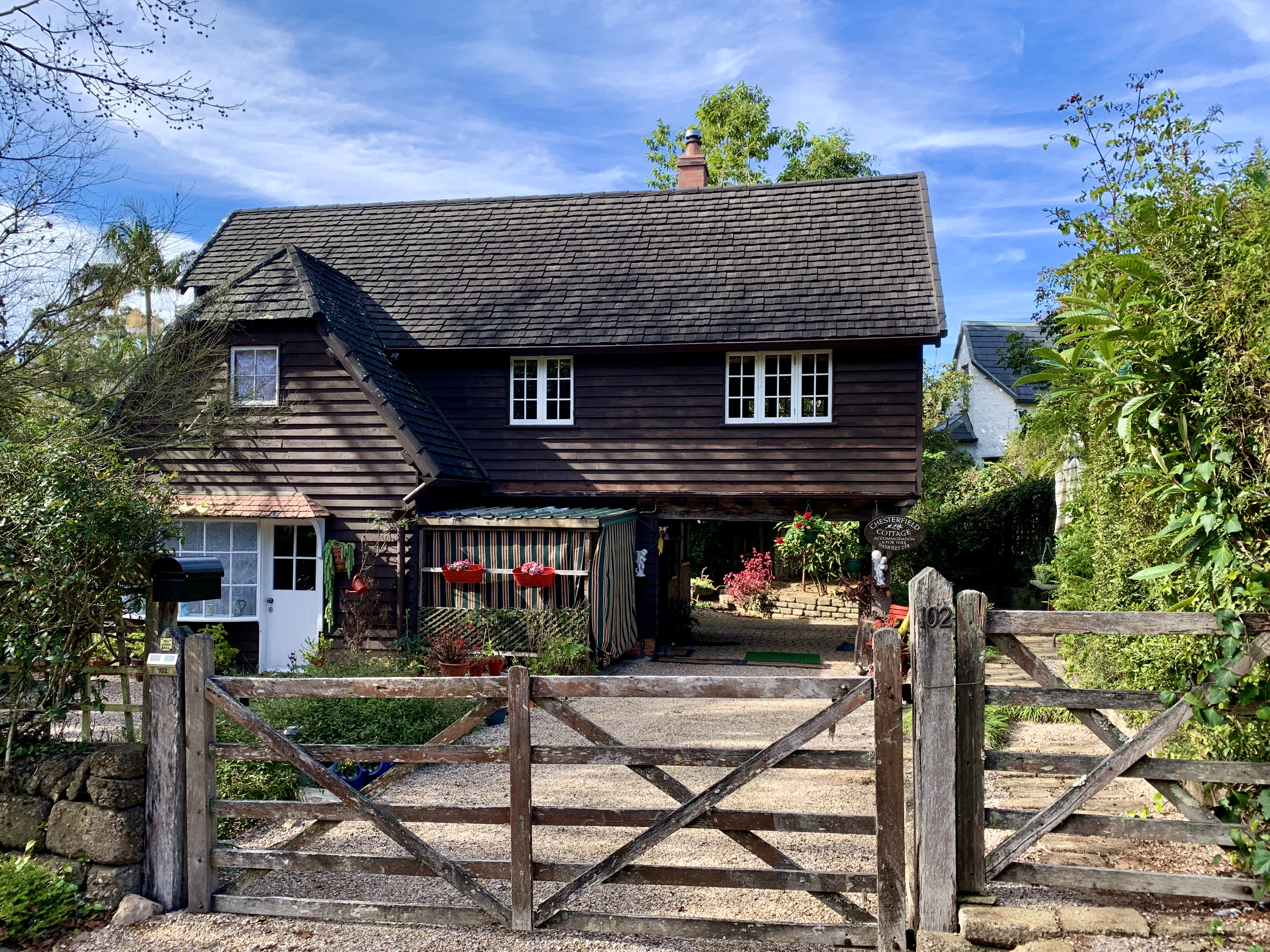
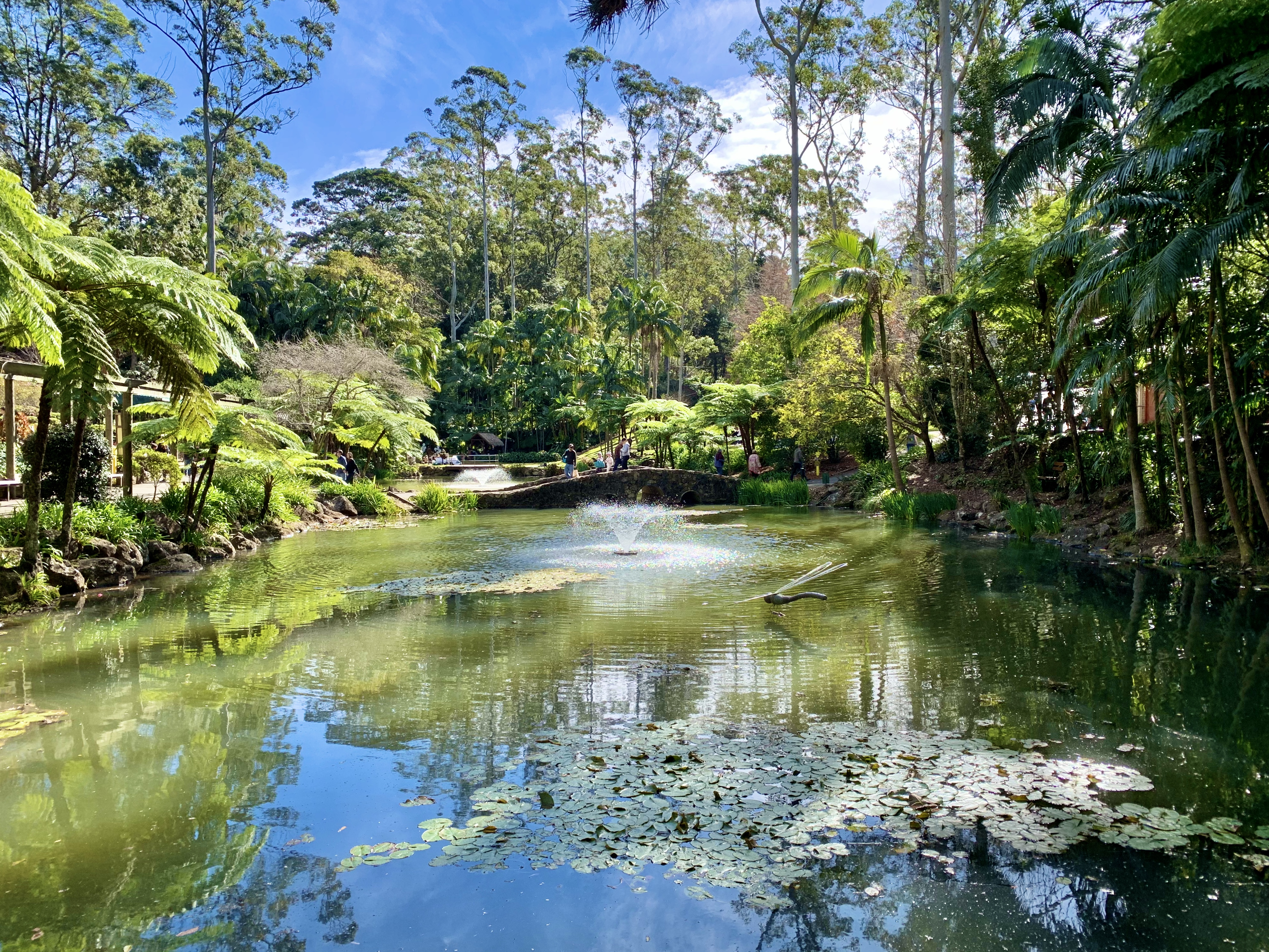
- Left to right; Bavarian Grill Haus & Red Baron Brewery, The Polish Place; Gallery Walk, Tamborine Mountain, Tamborine Mountain Botanic Gardens

Highest point
- Elevation: 525 m (1,722 ft)

Naming
- Native name: Jambreen (Minjungbal)

Geography
- Location: Queensland, Australia
- Parent range: Great Dividing Range

Geology
- Rock age: Aquitanian
- Mountain type: Shield volcano

Tamborine Mountain
- Suburb
- Interactive map of Tamborine Mountain
- Coordinates: 27.9697°S 153.1994°E
- Country: Australia
- State: Queensland
- LGA: Scenic Rim Region
- Location: 32.8 km (20.4 mi) NE of Beaudesert; 37.1 km (23.1 mi) WNW of Southport; 35.4 km (22.0 mi) WNW of Surfers Paradise; 72.0 km (44.7 mi) SSE of Brisbane CBD

Government
  - State electorate: Scenic Rim
  - Federal division: Wright

Area
  - Total: 42.5 km^{2} (16.4 sq mi)

Population
  - Total: 8,105 (2021 census)
  - Density: 190.71/km^{2} (493.9/sq mi)
- Time zone: UTC+10:00 (AEST)
- Postcode: 4272
Suburbs around Tamborine Mountain
Tamborine	Cedar Creek	Wongawallan
Boyland	Tamborine Mountain	Guanaba
Wonglepong; Benobble	Witheren	Clagiraba

Tamborine Mountain, also known simply as Mount Tamborine, is a plateau, geographic subregion and locality in the Scenic Rim Region of Queensland, Australia. In the 2021 census, Tamborine Mountain had a population of 8,105 people.

== Geography ==
The plateau is a 28 km^{2} (11 sq mi), 8 by 4 kilometres (5.0 by 2.5 mi). The name is from the Yugambeh language of the Wangerriburra Clan, a name from Jambireen meaning wild lime tree, or dum/gom bireen meaning yam in a cliff.

There are three towns on the plateau: North Tamborine, Eagle Heights and Mount Tamborine, with a total population of about 5,100. The plateau is classified as a rural area, with zoning restrictions that prohibit property from being subdivided. There is no reticulated water supply or sewerage system, and residents are dependent on rainwater, bores and septic systems. Many residents commute to work on the Gold Coast or in Brisbane.

The Tamborine Mountain road network enables access to the plateau from four points in the surrounding lowlands, providing alternatives in case of flooding, other natural disasters, or planned maintenance works.

=== Geology ===
The geological origin of the plateau is a lava flow from the Mount Warning volcanic eruption 22 million years ago. Tamborine Mountain rises at the start of the north-east section of the Scenic Rim, the name given to a group of mountains in South East Queensland.

=== Important Bird Area ===
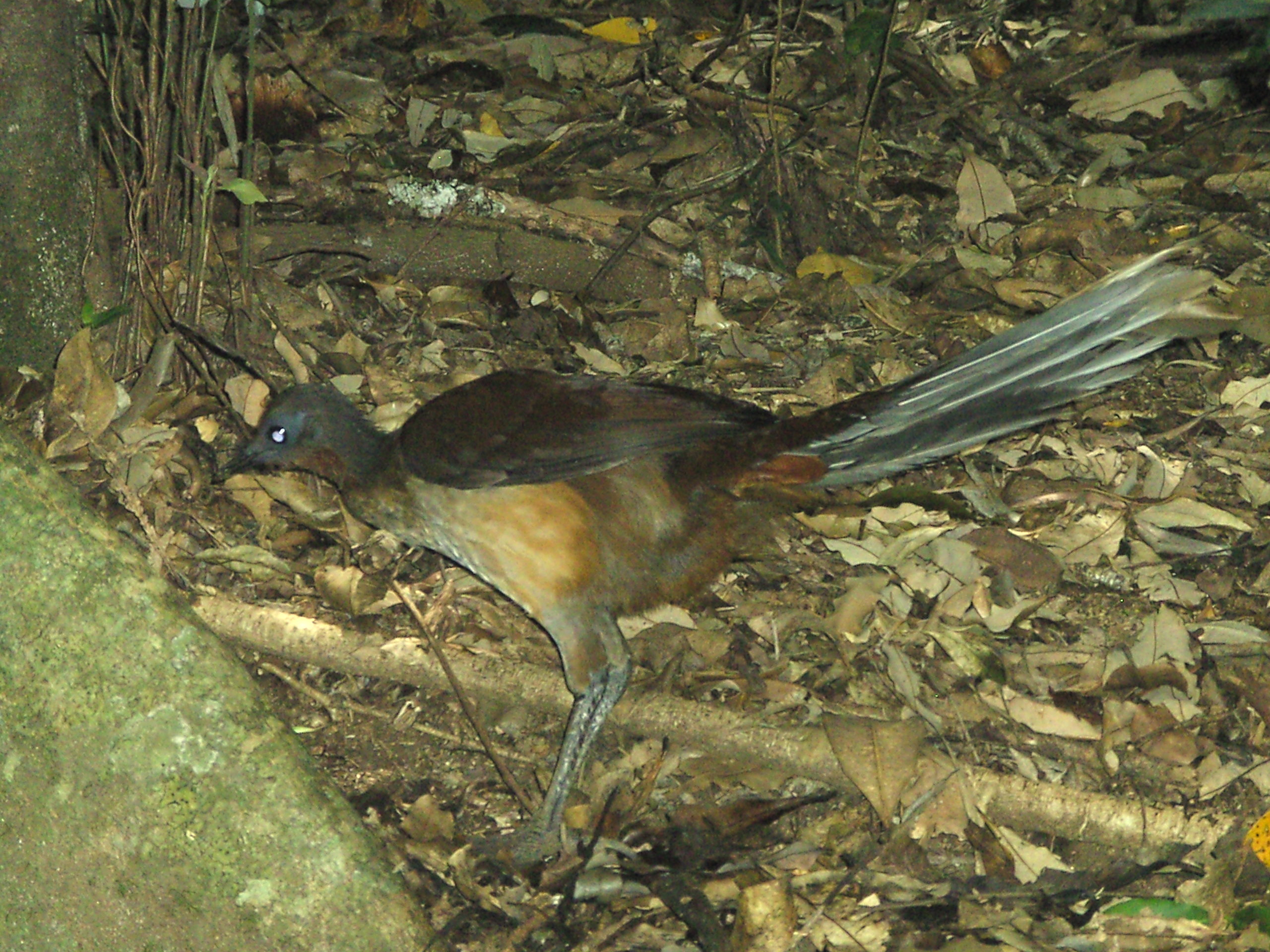
The mountain is an important area for Albert's lyrebirds

Parts of the plateau and surrounding foothills encompassing the wet subtropical rainforest habitats below the largely cleared plateau summit, and above the surrounding eucalypt forests, have been identified as a 38 km^{2} (15 sq mi) Important Bird Area (IBA) by BirdLife International. It includes the southern fragments of the Tamborine National Park. The IBA supports an isolated northern population of Albert's lyrebirds, as well as pale-yellow robins, green catbirds, regent bowerbirds and Australian logrunners. Additional significant birds recorded from the site are glossy black cockatoos, sooty owls, marbled frogmouths and noisy pittas. Other animals present in the IBA include platypuses, short-beaked echidnas and Richmond birdwings.

=== Roads ===
A group of roads provides access to the mountain community from various lowland localities. These roads ensure continuity of access in times of flooding or other natural disasters, and during planned maintenance activities.

== History ==
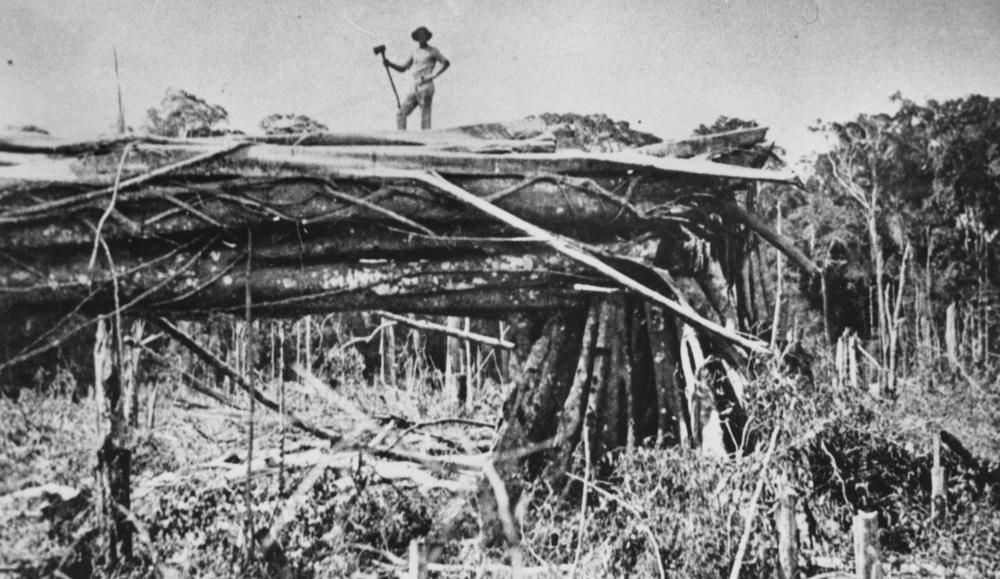
Timber cutting at Tamborine Mountain in 1912

Tamborine Mountain was inhabited by Aboriginal people for tens of thousands of years and, at the time of early British colonisation, it was in territory of the Wanggeriburra clan of the Yugambeh people. The origin of the name Tamborine comes from the anglicised version of the word Jambreen from the Yugambeh language. The spelling also appears on early records as Tchambreem, Tamboreen and even Goombireen, meaning "place of yams", and refers only to a specific vicinity within the modern day settlement of Tamborine. The actual mountain had a different name which appears to have not been recorded.

By the late 1850s, most of the Wanggeriburra had left the region.

Prior to British settlement, the mountain was covered with a diverse range of forest types. Unlike the lower land surrounding the mountain, the thick scrub on the mountain was seen as a barrier to settlement so the mountain was not opened for selection until 1875. However, the selectors were living in the surrounding area and being within 15 miles (24 km) of their selections were exempt from the requirements to live on their selections. Most did not develop the land and sold it once they were granted freehold. In 1878 the first selectors settled on the mountain blocks: John O'Callaghan (deputising for William Walsh) and his nephew, E.H. O'Callaghan. By 1886 most of the mountain had been selected but electoral rolls and church records suggest very few people were living on the mountain.

On 30 January 1893, auctioneers Arthur Martin & Co offered 128 blocks of land, mostly 2-acre (0.81 ha) lots, in the St Bernard Estate, bounded by Alpine Terrace to the north and to the south by Power Parade, St Bernard Street and Siganto Street. The lots were described as suitable for gentlemen's residences with "scenery unsurpassed in Australia" and for the shooter "turkeys, pigeons, wallabies and kangaroos abound".

Tambourine Mountain Provisional School opened in February 1893 in a small cottage provided by William Geissman. On 2 February 1900 it became Tambourine Mountain State School, later adopting the spelling Tamborine Mountain State School.

Much clearing for agriculture took place, though efforts were made to protect the natural values of the area, with Witches Falls National Park (now part of the Tamborine National Park) being declared in 1908, the first in Queensland. The Tamborine National Park is made up of 12 separate sections of land, mainly remnant rainforest, on the plateau and surrounding foothills. A tourist road to the mountain was opened in 1924.

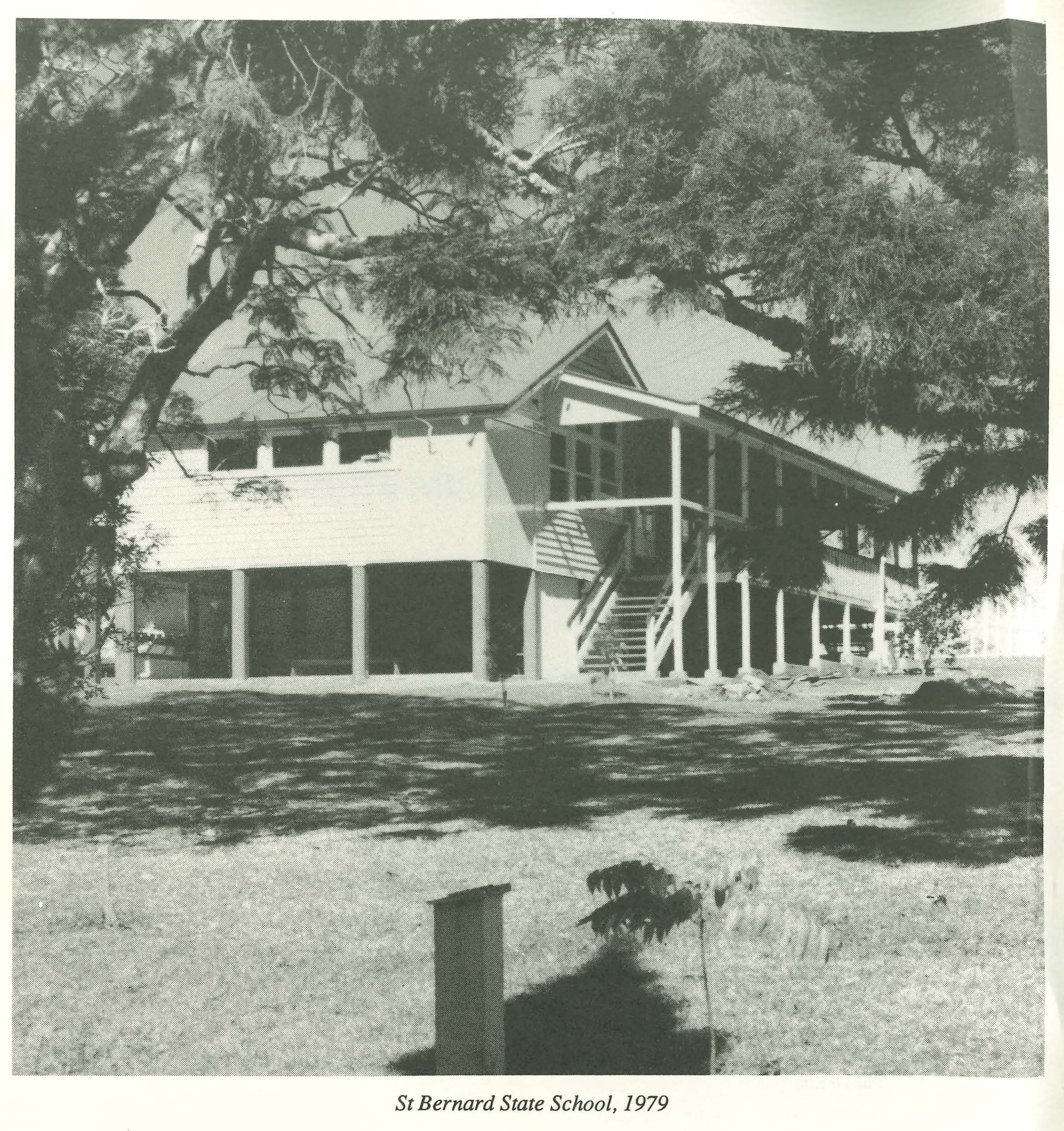
St Bernard State School, 1979

St Bernard State School opened on 27 January 1914.

On 30 May 1926, a United Protestant Church was opened in Eagle Heights Road on land donated by Mrs SA Jenyns. It was built by Mr V Anderson. It was available for use by all Protestant denominations but legally owned by the Presbyterian Church. The church continued to be used in that way until the late 1960s. It was purchased by May and Henry Bishopp in 1982 and donated to the Tamborine Mountain Historical Society, who relocated the church to their Tamborine Mountain Heritage Centre at 53 Wongawallan Road (27.9208°S 153.2047°E).

In 1927, a branch of the Queensland Country Women's Association was established.

In 1930 land was purchased at 2–4 Geissmann Street on the corner with Main Street (27.9238°S 153.1853°E) as a site for a Presbyterian church. A stump capping ceremony was held on 31 January 1931. The Mount Tamborine Presbyterian Church church officially opened on Saturday on 20 June 1931. The total cost of the land and the building was £450. The manse was located at 29 Griffith Street. By 1972 the growing congregation was too large for the church and so it was decided to purchase a 1-acre (0.40 ha) nearby site at 34–36 Main Street (27.9242°S 153.1854°E). The United Protestant Church was closed in March 1972 and sold for $10,000 to Mr E Tannock to fund the new church with the bell and its tower being removed to incorporate into the new church. The manse in Griffith Street was also sold to raise funds. The new church was consecrated on 3 May 1975 by Reverend Colin Kay. A hall was erected at the rear of the new church in 1980. The church on Geissmann Street was sold to fund a new manse. The congregation continued to grow and the church building was extended to double its size and add other amenities. The extended church was officially opened on 14 November 2010.

On 25 September 1990, 11 people were killed and 38 injured when a bus overturned and rolled down a slope on Henri Robert Drive. Most were senior citizens from a social club in Newcastle, New South Wales. A coronial inquest did not support the laying of criminal charges in relation to the incident.

Tamborine Mountain College opened in 1995.

The Tamborine Mountain Campus of Helensvale State High School opened in 1999 with approximately 150 students in Years 8 and 9. It became Tamborine Mountain State High School in January 2001.

== Demographics ==
In the 2016 census, Tamborine Mountain had a population of 7,506 people.

In the 2021 census, Tamborine Mountain had a population of 8,105 people.

== Heritage listings ==
Tamborine Mountain has a number of heritage-listed sites, including:

- Tamborine Mountain Road, accessed from Geissmann Drive
- former Presbyterian Church, 2–4 Geissmann Street (corner of Main Street)
- former Mountain Crest Guesthouse, 6–8 Main Street
- Zamia Theatre, 22 Main Street
- Tamborine Showgrounds and Hall, 386–398 Main Western Road

== Education ==
Tamborine Mountain State School is a government primary (Prep–6) school for boys and girls at 104–118 Curtis Road (27.9308°S 153.2002°E). In 2018, the school had an enrolment of 581 students with 47 teachers (41 full-time equivalent) and 27 non-teaching staff (18 full-time equivalent). It includes a special education program.

St Bernard State School is a government primary (Prep–6) school for boys and girls at 1–19 School Road (27.9704°S 153.1982°E). In 2018, the school had an enrolment of 238 students with 22 teachers (16 full-time equivalent) and 13 non-teaching staff (8 full-time equivalent). It includes a special education program.

Tamborine Mountain College is a private primary and secondary (Prep–12) school for boys and girls at 80 Beacon Road (27.9272°S 153.1763°E). In 2018, the school had an enrolment of 462 students with 36 teachers (33 full-time equivalent) and 16 non-teaching staff (13 full-time equivalent).

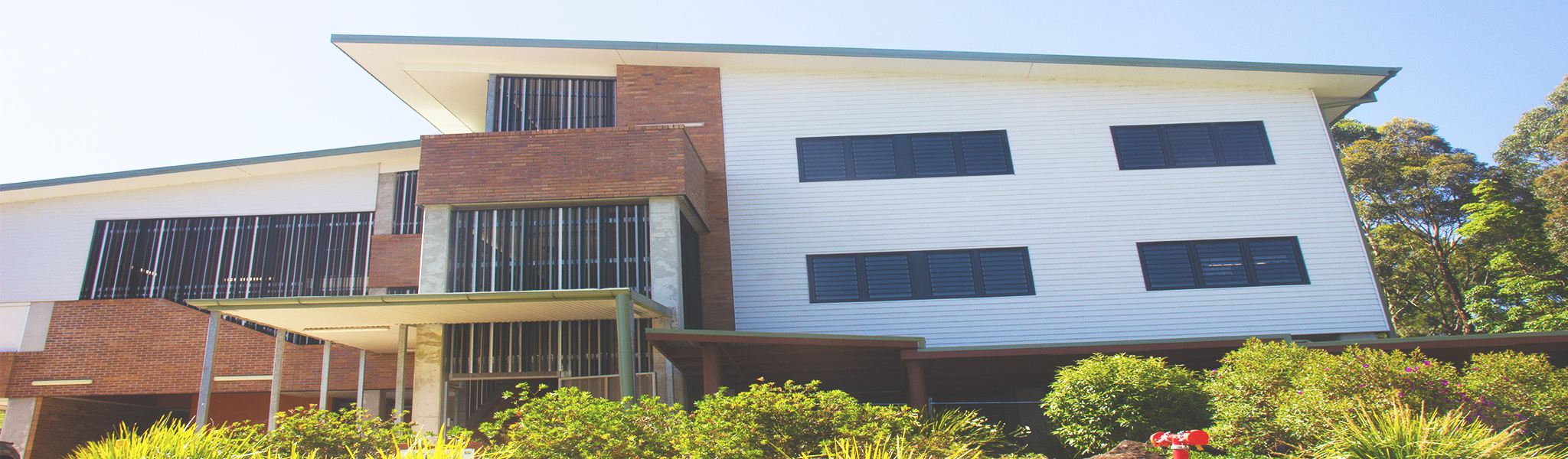
Tamborine Mount State High School, 2024

Tamborine Mountain State High School is a government secondary (7–12) school for boys and girls at 67–87 Holt Road (27.9328°S 153.1900°E). In 2018, the school had an enrolment of 936 students with 81 teachers (68 full-time equivalent) and 39 non-teaching staff (31 full-time equivalent). It includes a special education program.

== Amenities ==
The Scenic Rim Regional Council operates a public library on the corner of Main Street and Yuulong Road.

== Attractions ==
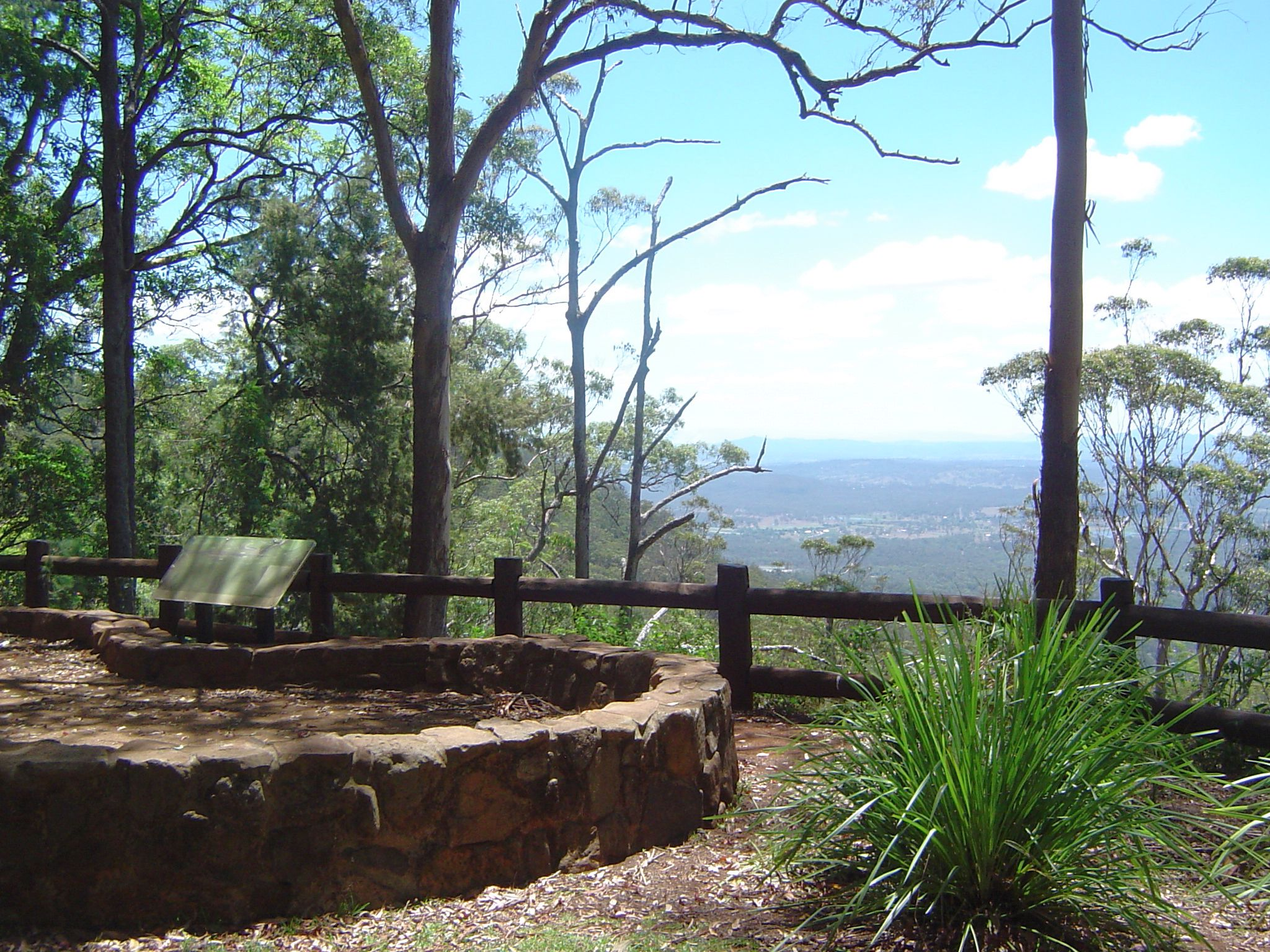
The Knoll Lookout, 2012

Rotary Lookout is on the western boundary of the locality, opposite 154–172 Main Western Road (27.94°S 153.1797°E).

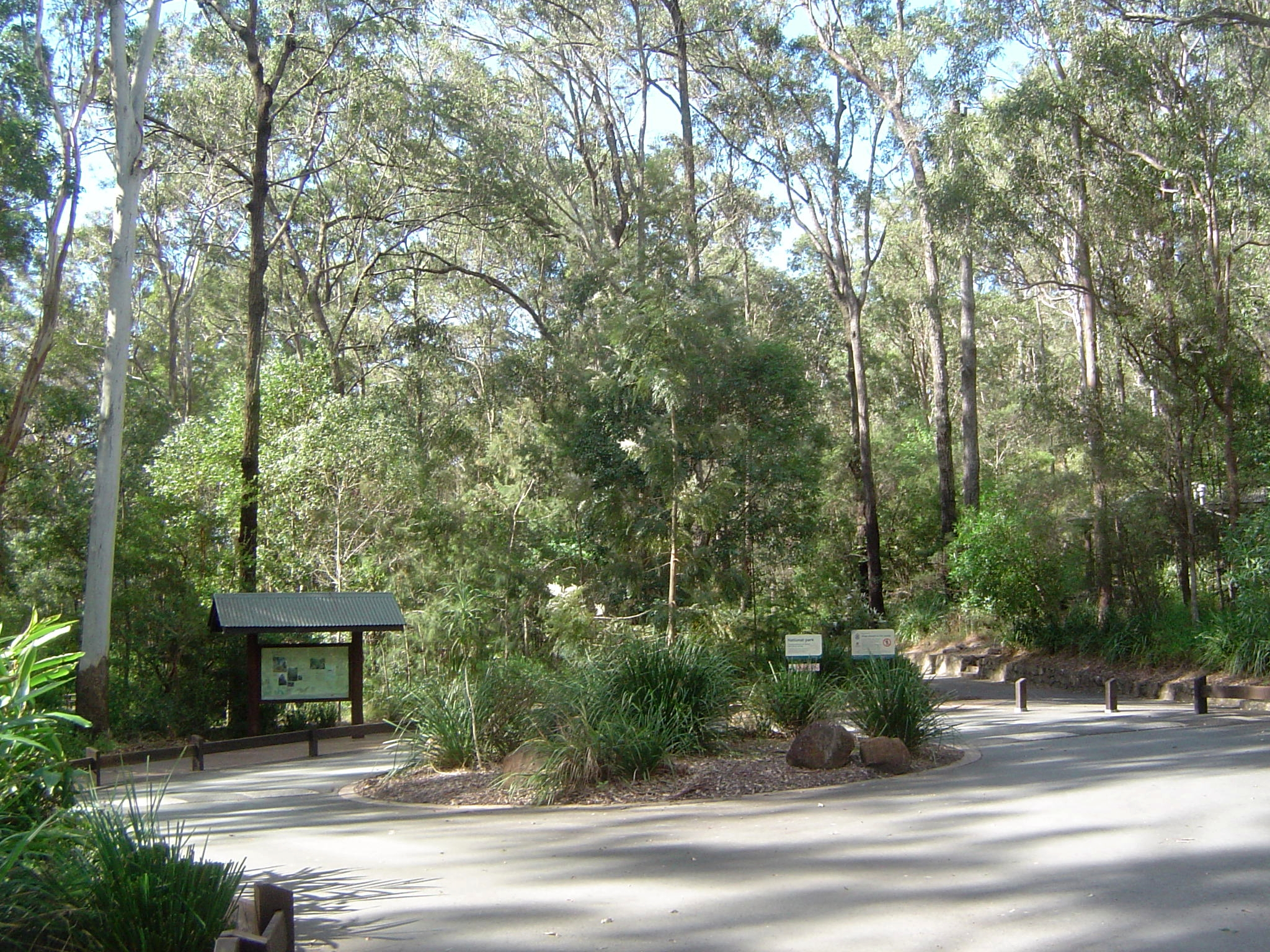
Cedar Creek Falls, 2011

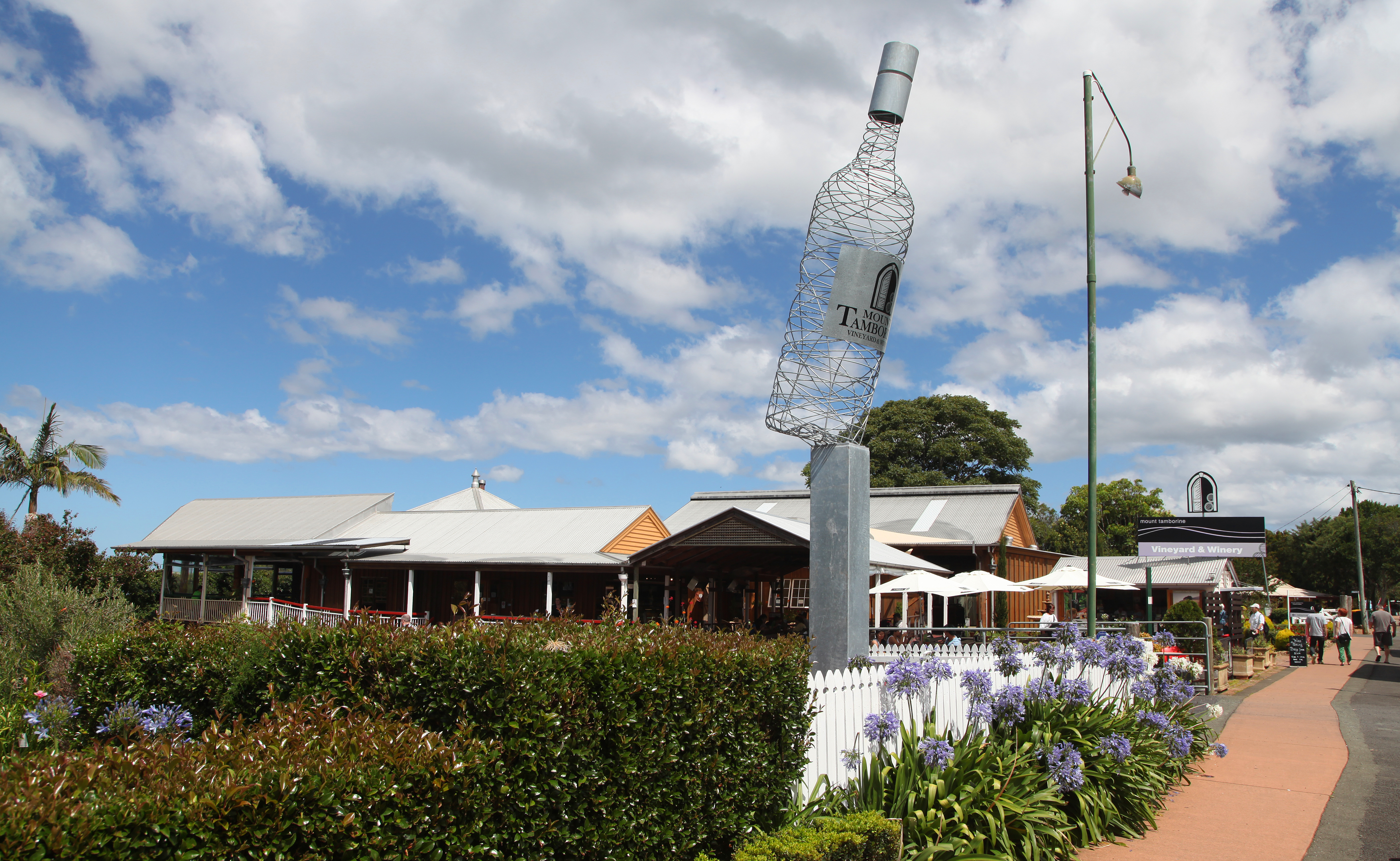
Gallery Walk

Tamborine Mountain attracts many tourists to "Gallery Walk" along Long Road, a street devoted to art galleries, cafes and souvenir shops. Other tourism-heavy areas include Main Street, two one-way roads with cafes, library, fuel, hardware stores, newsagent, the Zamia Theatre, various other shops, and the Tamborine Showground Markets, held every second Sunday of the month. A shopping centre including a SupaIGA supermarket was opened in 2011, and expansion plans were lodged in 2023.

The Glow-Worm Caves are a man-made attraction which opened to visitors in March 2006. They are located in one of the many wineries on the mountain. There are several fine dining locations.

Tamborine Mountain is well known for walking tracks winding through rainforest regions and occasionally past cliffs or waterfalls. The most well-known ones are the Curtis Falls rainforest track and the Knoll. The Palm Grove walk is a 30-minute downhill trek to a massive fallen fig tree (blown down by storms in 2013) through a vast skyline filled with 30-metre (98 ft) tall palms. The track passes mountain streams, a waterfall and wildlife. The Botanic Gardens are found in Eagle Heights.

== Climate ==
The climate is a subtropical highland climate (Cfb, according to the Köppen climate classification), with the annual rainfall of about 1,550 mm falling mainly between December and March. Temperatures vary between maxima of 17 °C in winter and 25 °C in summer, and are usually 5 °C to 7 °C degrees cooler than the surrounding lowlands. Winters are usually dry and sunny, with cool maximum temperatures; however, the temperature rarely drops below freezing due to the thick forest cover. With its fertile red volcanic soil and high rainfall, the plateau produces rich crops of avocados, kiwifruit, passionfruit, rhubarb, apples and mangoes. The Mountain receives an average of 102.9 clear days, annually.

Climate data for Mt Tamborine
Month	Jan	Feb	Mar	Apr	May	Jun	Jul	Aug	Sep	Oct	Nov	Dec	Year
Record high °C (°F)	35.7 (96.3)	35.3 (95.5)	34.9 (94.8)	31.4 (88.5)	27.4 (81.3)	26.6 (79.9)	25.4 (77.7)	24.9 (76.8)	29.6 (85.3)	35.8 (96.4)	37.8 (100.0)	37.8 (100.0)	37.8 (100.0)
Mean daily maximum °C (°F)	25.7 (78.3)	25.3 (77.5)	24.4 (75.9)	22.6 (72.7)	19.8 (67.6)	17.7 (63.9)	17.1 (62.8)	18.3 (64.9)	20.3 (68.5)	22.6 (72.7)	24.6 (76.3)	25.9 (78.6)	22.0 (71.6)
Mean daily minimum °C (°F)	17.1 (62.8)	17.3 (63.1)	16.4 (61.5)	14.0 (57.2)	11.2 (52.2)	9.1 (48.4)	8.0 (46.4)	8.6 (47.5)	10.4 (50.7)	12.8 (55.0)	14.8 (58.6)	16.3 (61.3)	13.0 (55.4)
Record low °C (°F)	11.7 (53.1)	10.3 (50.5)	6.9 (44.4)	7.6 (45.7)	3.8 (38.8)	−0.6 (30.9)	1.4 (34.5)	−1.1 (30.0)	−0.3 (31.5)	4.7 (40.5)	8.3 (46.9)	9.6 (49.3)	−1.1 (30.0)
Average rainfall mm (inches)	224.6 (8.84)	223.6 (8.80)	190.1 (7.48)	131.2 (5.17)	122.5 (4.82)	98.8 (3.89)	82.2 (3.24)	55.8 (2.20)	57.1 (2.25)	91.1 (3.59)	120.9 (4.76)	165.2 (6.50)	1,563.1 (61.54)
Average rainy days (≥ 0.2mm)	14.8	15.0	15.9	12.2	10.9	9.0	8.5	7.5	8.3	10.0	12.0	13.1	137.2
Source: Bureau of Meteorology

== See also ==
- List of mountains of Australia
