= Tamborine Mountain State High School =

School in Queensland, Australia

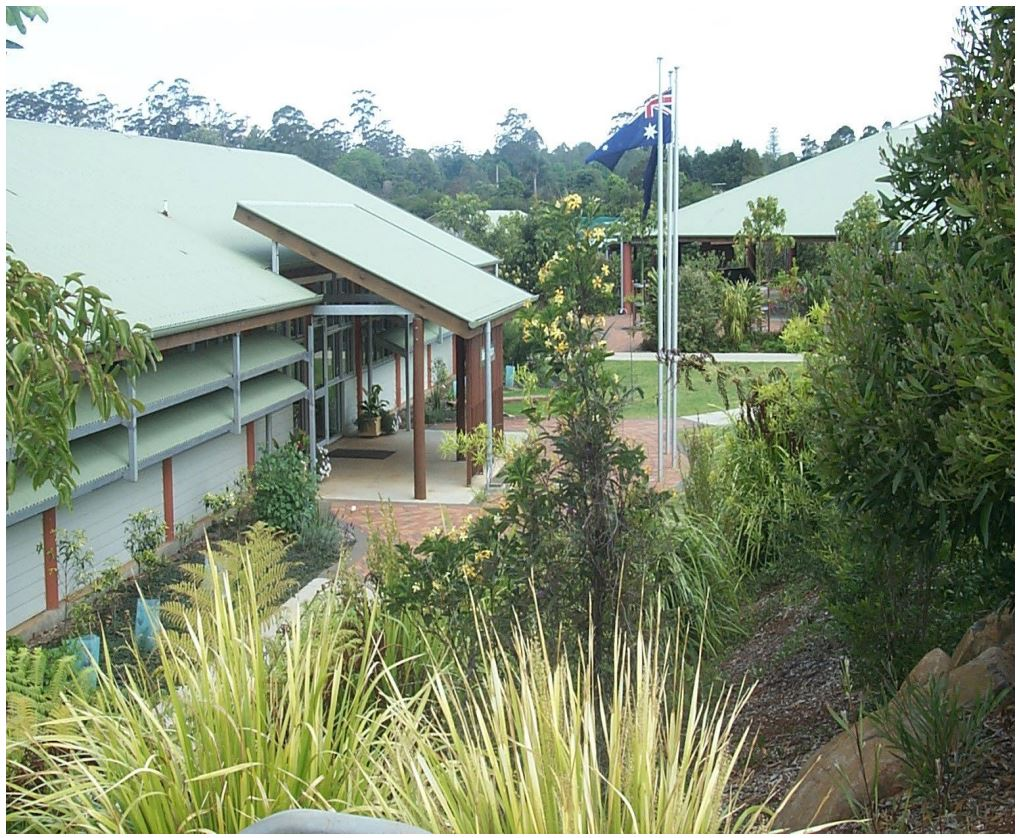
- Tamborine Mount State High School, 2023

Location
- Holt Road, North Tamborine QLD, Australia; 27°55′59″S 153°11′26″E

Information
- Type: Co-educational state secondary (Year 7–12)
- Established: 1999
- Principal: Jessica Keavney
- Enrollment: 898 (2023)
- Website: https://tamborinemtnshs.eq.edu.au/

Tamborine Mountain State High School is a public, co-educational secondary school located in Tamborine Mountain, in the Scenic Rim Region, Queensland, Australia. It is administered by the Queensland Department of Education and, as of 2025, had an enrolment of 943 students, with 83 teaching and 56 non-teaching staff. The school caters to students from Year 7 to Year 12 and was established in 1999.

== History ==
In 1999, the school was established as a campus of Helensvale State High School offering Years 8 to 10, known as "Helensvale State High School, Tamborine Mountain Campus". In 2002, Tamborine Mountain State High School became a separate school offering Years 8 to 12.

== Defamation case ==
In 2019, Tamborine Mountain State High School principal Tracey Brose launched defamation action against five parents, claiming more than $1 million in damages for comments made about her on Facebook and a Change.org petition while she was temporarily suspended from her job in 2016. In 2020, Judge Catherine Muir ruled in favour of Brose and ordered Donna and Miguel Baluskas to pay $3000 in damages each.

== See also ==
- Education in Queensland
- List of schools in West Moreton
