= Tamborine, Queensland =

Tamborine
- Town
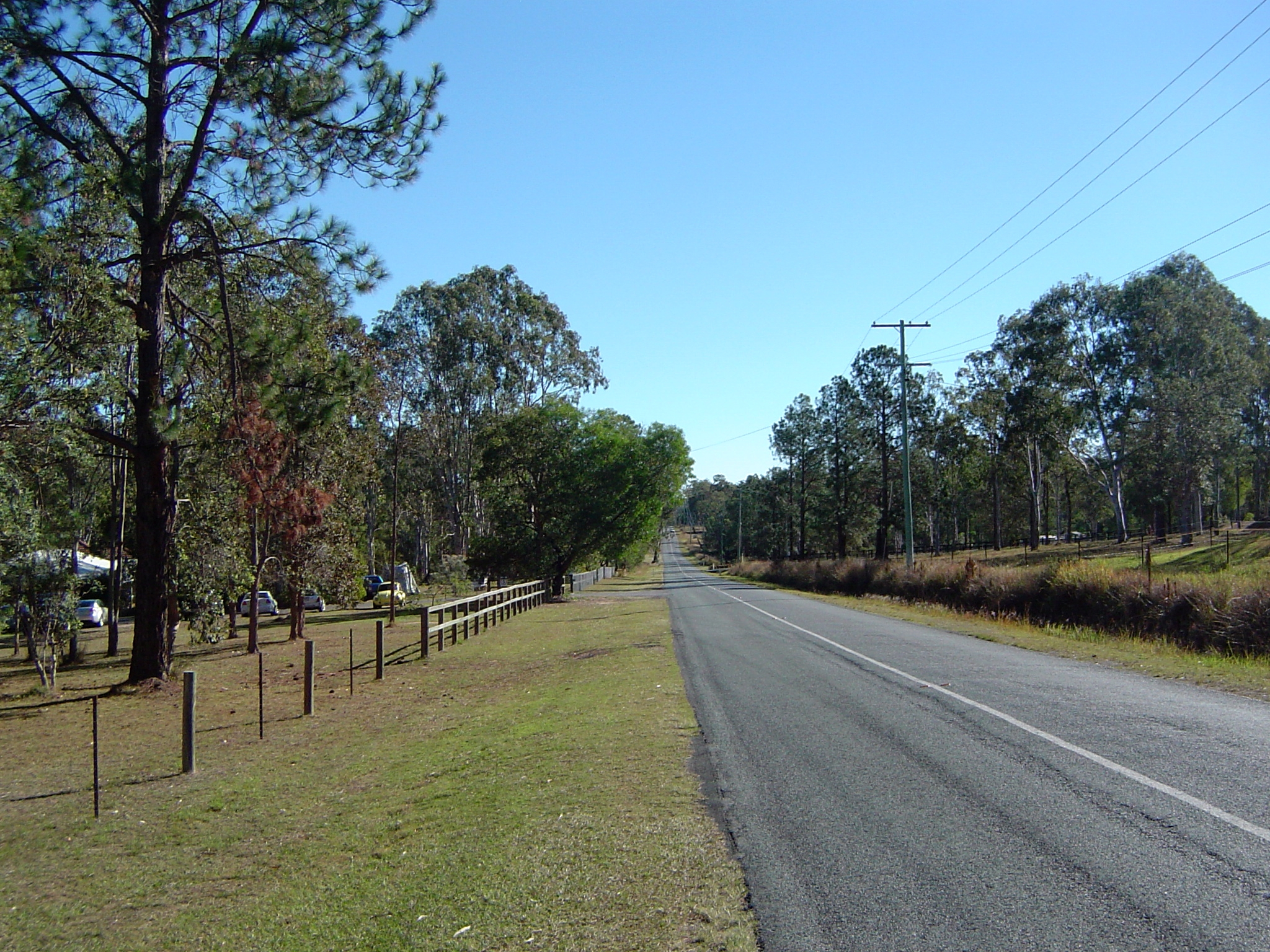
- Greensward Road, 2014

- Interactive map of Tamborine
- Coordinates: 27.8808°S 153.1302°E
- Country: Australia
- State: Queensland
- LGAs: Logan City; Scenic Rim Region
- Location: 11.1 km (6.9 mi) S of Yarrabilba; 21.0 km (13.0 mi) NE of Beaudesert; 31.6 km (19.6 mi) S of Logan Central; 60.2 km (37.4 mi) S of Brisbane CBD

Government
  - State electorates: Scenic Rim; Logan
  - Federal division: Wright

Area
  - Total: 71.2 km^{2} (27.5 sq mi)

Population
  - Total: 4,388 (2021 census)
  - Density: 61.63/km^{2} (159.62/sq mi)
- Time zone: UTC+10:00 (AEST)
- Postcode: 4270
Localities around Tamborine
| Logan Village | Yarrabilba; Kairabah | Cedar Creek |
| Jimboomba | Tamborine | Cedar Creek |
| Mundoolun | Boyland | Tamborine Mountain |

Tamborine is a rural town in the Scenic Rim Region and a locality split between the Scenic Rim Region and the City of Logan in Queensland, Australia. In the 2021 census, the locality of Tamborine had a population of 4,388 people.

== Geography ==
Bromfleet is a neighbourhood within the locality (27.9067°S 153.1151°E). Plunkett is a neighbourhood within the locality (27.8667°S 153.1500°E).

Tamborine National Park consists of a number of discontiguous areas, the largest of which is the east of the locality, extending east into the neighbouring localities of Cedar Creek and Tamborine Mountain.

The Beaudesert–Beenleigh Road runs through from south-west to north-east. State Route 95, Waterford-Tamborine Road and Tamborine Mountain Road, runs through from north-west to south-east.

The land use is a mix of rural residential housing (particularly in the west of the locality, grazing on native vegetation, and a sand quarry in Clurtha Creek Road.

== History ==
=== Wanggeriburra people ===
Yugembah (also known as Yugumbir, Jugambel, Jugambeir, Jugumbir, Jukam, Jukamba) is one of the Australian Aboriginal languages in areas that include the Beenleigh, Beaudesert, Gold Coast, Logan, Scenic Rim, Albert River, Coolangatta, Coomera, Logan River, Pimpama, Tamborine and Tweed River Valley, within the local government boundaries of the City of Gold Coast, City of Logan, Scenic Rim Region and the Tweed River Valley.

Before British colonisation the region was inhabited by the Wanggeriburra clan of the Yugambeh people. They called the area Tamboreen or Tchambreen meaning "place of yams".

=== British colonisation ===
British colonists, Mr Whitting and Hicks, took land at Tamboreen in 1845 and changed the name to Burton Vale. Since then, the pastoral property has been called Tamboreen then Tambourine, while the name of the present-day settlement is Tamborine. During the 1850s, various raids by the Native Police, particularly under Sub-Inspector Frederick Wheeler, liquidated most of the Wanggeriburra people from the region.

Dugald Graham bought the Tambourine property in the 1850s while Joseph Delpratt took ownership in the 1870s. Closer settlement followed with Thomas Plunkett opening a store at Tambourine in 1872, and a post office opened two years later.

=== Church and schools ===
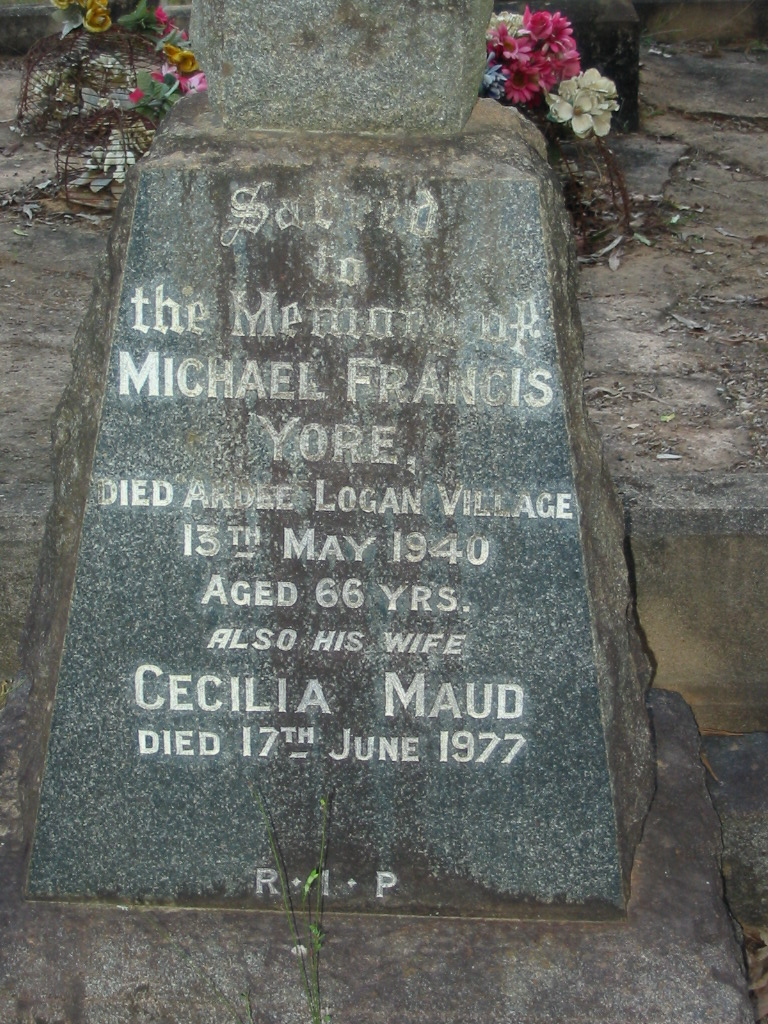
Headstone for Michael Yore, Tamborine Catholic Cemetery

St Patrick's Catholic Church was established in the early 1870s on the south bank of the Albert River on Michael Yores' property "Spiddle" near a swamp. Originally there was a cemetery near the church but due to flooding, it was decided to relocate the Catholic cemetery to land donated by Thomas Plunkett on Plunkett Road. In the 1960s the church was moved to the site of the former Tamborine railway station, where it was renovated and then dedicated in June 1966 by the Roman Catholic Archbishop of Brisbane Patrick Mary O'Donnell. As at 2020, a monthly vigil service is held at the church.

Tambourine Provisional School was instigated by Michael Yore and Thomas Plunkett. It was opened on 24 August 1874 in St Patrick's Catholic Church. In February 1905, the Queensland Government provided 10 acres (4.0 ha) for a permanent school building at 2680-2726 Waterford Tamborine Road (27.8767°S 153.1250°E). On 1 January 1909 the school became Tambourine State School. The spelling was changed to Tamborine on 29 April 1926. In 1933 a larger teacher's residence was built. Tamborine State School closed on 10 July 1970. The teacher's residence was relocated to Tamrookum. The school building was relocated to Chambers Flat at the Beaudesert Shire Council's depot. The site of the school is now the Tamborine School Park. The former school building has been returned to the park where it is signed as "The Little School House" and is available for community meetings.

=== Railway and halls ===
The Canungra railway line from Logan Village railway station on the South Coast railway line to Canungra was opened on 2 July 1915. The railway line closed on 1 July 1955. There were three railway stations on the line within present day locality of Tamborine:

- Plunkett railway station (27.8486°S 153.14071°E)
- Tamborine railway station (27.8796°S 153.1298°E)
- Bromfleet railway station (27.9057°S 153.1129°E)

The Tamborine Memorial Hall was built in 1919.

=== World War II ===
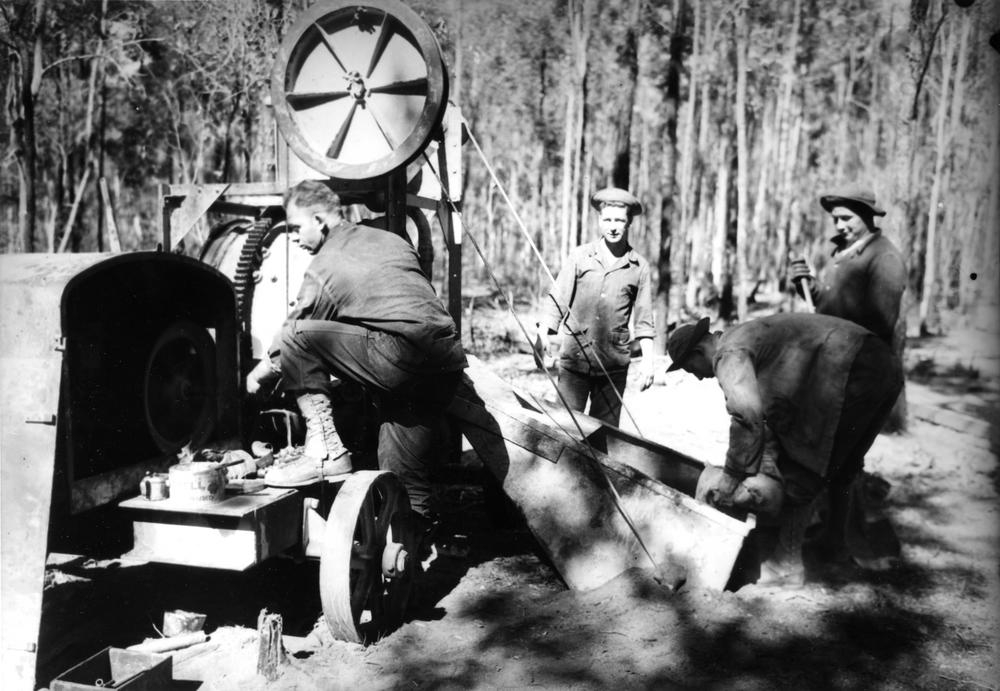
Americans in Camp Cable, Queensland

During World War II, the 32nd Infantry Division of the American Army established a camp initially called Camp Tamborine (but later called Camp Cable after deceased soldier Gerald O. Cable) at Tamborine in 1942. Its location is now Logan Village / Yarrabilba.

Formerly in the Shire of Beaudesert, Tamborine was split between Logan City and Scenic Rim Region following the local government amalgamations in March 2008.

== Demographics ==
In the 2011 census, the locality of Tamborine had a population of 3,464 people.

In the 2016 census, the locality of Tamborine had a population of 3,950 people.

In the 2021 census, the locality of Tamborine had a population of 4,388 people.

== Heritage listings ==
Tamborine has a heritage-listed site, Tamborine House, at 869 Mundoolun Connection Road (27.9096°S 153.1092°E)

== Education ==
There are no schools in Tamborine. The nearest government primary schools are Yarrabilba State School in neighbouring Yarrabilba to the north-west, Cedar Creek State School in neighbouring Cedar Creek to the north-east, and Jimboomba State School in neighbouring Jimboomba to the west. The nearest government secondary school is Yarrabilba State Secondary College in Yarrabilba.

== Facilities ==
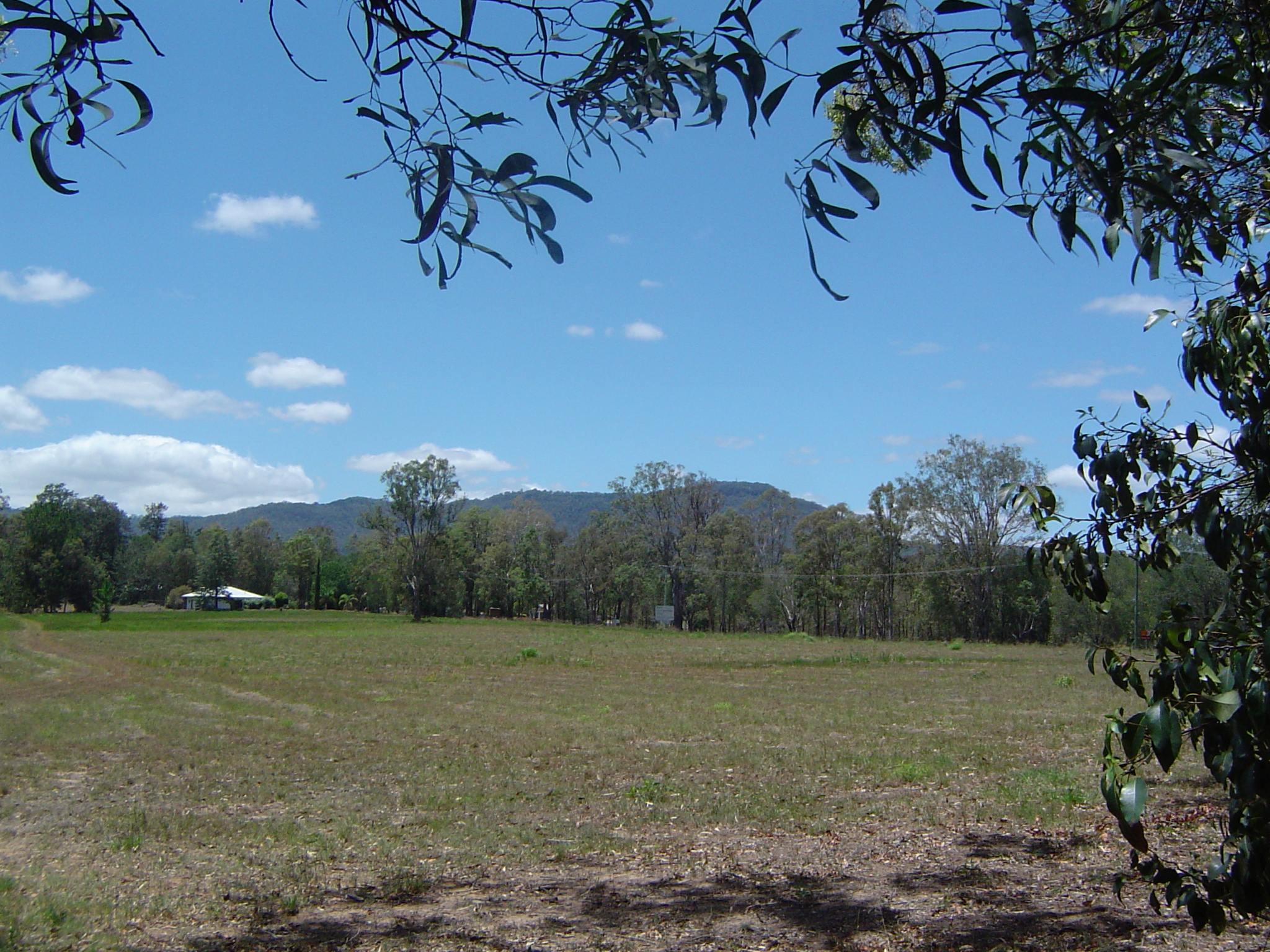
Tamborine Mountain as seen from Tamborine School Park

Tamborine Rural Fire Station is at 2765-2771 Waterford Tamborine Road (27.8799°S 153.1281°E).

Tamborine Catholic Cemetery is at 83-89 Plunkett Road (27.8523°S 153.1291°E). Cedar Creek Cemetery (sometimes called Plunkett Road Cemetery) is at 487 Plunkett Road (27.8425°S 153.1636°E).

== Amenities ==
Tamborine Memorial Hall is a public hall at 2760 Waterford Tamborine Road (27.8770°S 153.1250°E).

The Scenic Rim Regional Council operates a mobile library service which visits the corner or Waterford-Tamborine Road & Beenleigh-Beaudesert Road, opposite the Shell service station (27.8803°S 153.1295°E).

There are a number of parks in the area, including:

- Cedar Creek Park (27.8424°S 153.1792°E)
- Fred Bucholz Park (27.8971°S 153.1105°E)
- Birnam Range Park (27.8419°S 153.0781°E)
