= Wayne Roberts (activist) =

Canadian food policy analyst (1944–2021)

- Born: September 30, 1944; Toronto, Ontario, Canada
- Died: January 20, 2021 (aged 76); Toronto, Ontario, Canada
- Occupations: Food policy analyst and writer, Rabble.ca columnist, food activist and public speaker
- Known for: Food policy
- Awards: Queen's Diamond Jubilee Medal; Food Secure Canada's Lifetime Achievement Award

Wayne Roberts (30 September 1944 – 20 January 2021) was a Canadian food policy analyst and writer. He was known for his role as the manager of the Toronto Food Policy Council (TFPC) from 2000-2010. The TFPC, a citizen body of thirty food activists, is responsible for generating food policy for the City of Toronto government.

As a leading member of the City of Toronto government's Environmental Task Force, Roberts helped develop a number of official plans for the city, including its Environmental Plan Clean, Green and Healthy: A Plan for an Environmentally Sustainable Toronto and Toronto's Food Charter. These were adopted by Toronto City Council in 2000 and 2001 respectively. His manual, based on Toronto's experiences, is called, Food for City Building: a Field Guide for Planners, Actionists and Entrepreneurs.

Roberts included many ideas and projects of the TFPC in his book, The No-Nonsense Guide to World Food (2013).

In April 2009, under Roberts's leadership, the TFPC received the Bob Hunter Environmental Achievement Award for its efforts to make food an action item on the environmental agenda. The TFPC also won honorary mention for a major award from the Community Food Security Coalition that honors exceptional work to promote food sovereignty in October 2009.

Roberts died on 20 January 2021 at the age of 76.

== Career ==
Roberts earned a Ph.D. in social and economic history from the University of Toronto in 1978. He has written twelve books, including: Get A Life! (1995) a manual on green economics, and Real Food For A Change (1999), which promotes a food system based on the four ingredients of health, joy, justice and nature. From 1989 to 2013, he wrote a column for NOW Magazine, generally on themes that linked social justice, public health and green economics.

Roberts published "A Green New Deal" in the April–May 1992 issue of Canadian Dimension, which is believed to be the first use of the term in print.

In 2002, Roberts received the Canadian Environment Award for his contributions to sustainable living. NOW Magazine named Roberts one of Toronto's leading visionaries of the past twenty years. In 2008, he received the Canadian Eco-Hero Award presented by Planet in Focus. In 2011, he received the University of Toronto's Arbor Award in recognition of his role in launching the university's first post-secondary courses on food security studies at New College.

Roberts chaired the Toronto-based Coalition for a Green Economy for fifteen years.

Prior to his involvement with environmental issues, Roberts was active in the Trotskyist movement during the 1970s, and later worked for two decades in community organizing, university teaching, media, labor education, industrial relations and union administration. During the latter part of this period, he wrote a number of books including: Cracking The Canadian Formula (1992) on the Energy and Chemical Workers Union, Don't Call Me Servant (1993) on the Ontario civil service and Ontario Public Service Employees Union, and Giving Away a Miracle (1992) on Bob Rae's New Democratic Party (NDP) government in Ontario.

Before his retirement in September 2010, Roberts was a major contributor to Toronto Medical Officer of Health David McKeown's food strategy report called Cultivating Food Connections. Roberts served on the boards of FoodShare, Unitarian Service Committee, Alternatives Journal, as well as Sustain Ontario's Advisory Council.

Roberts was a regular reporter on local and global food issues for Rabble.ca. He spoke across Europe and North America on matters related to food policy councils, food charters, food waste and food-related careers.

== Awards ==
- 2013 - Queen's Diamond Jubilee Medal in recognition of his community service contributions.
- 2012 - Lifetime achievement award from Food Secure Canada, recognizing his encouragement of youth activists.

== See also ==
- Food Security
- Toronto Food Policy Council
- Toronto Public Health
