= Toronto Food Policy Council =

Citizen body of food activists

The Toronto Food Policy Council (TFPC) is a citizen body of food activists and experts responsible for generating food policy for the City of Toronto government.

Formed in 1991, the 30-member TFPC supports scores of programs with the shared goal of ensuring equitable access to food, nutrition, community development and environmental health, acting as professional lobbyist for the people on food and related issues.

The TFPC is free to make its own decisions on food policy issues. Staff working with the TFPC are employed by, and responsible to, The Toronto Department of Public Health. This arrangement has gained interest from public health, community, food security and sustainable agriculture organizations around the world. The TFPC is under the leadership of Lauren Baker. Previous TFPC staff include Rod MacRae, Wayne Roberts and Yusuf Alam. In April, 2009, the TFPC received the Bob Hunter Environmental Achievement Award, given to a City of Toronto agency with a record of outstanding leadership, for its efforts to make food an action item on the environmental agenda. The TFPC also won an honorary mention for a major award from the Community Food Security Coalition for its work promoting food sovereignty in October, 2009.

Working to ensure all significant decisions and expenditures are viewed through a “food lens,” the Council, under the leadership of Co-chair Janice Etter, succeeded in having food issues highlighted in the city of Toronto's official plan, adopted by city council in 2002 and updated in 2007.

Some of the Council’s work has included:

- Helping community organisations obtain $3.5 million for projects increasing access to affordable nourishing food in the early 1990s.
- Successfully lobbying the federal government to refuse to license Bovine Growth Hormone, a biotechnology product, for use in Canadian dairy operations.
- Working with the Student Nutrition Coalition to expand school food programs in Toronto from 53 to 350.
- Founding the Rooftop Garden Resource Group to research and promote a green roof industry in Canada.
- Producing a ground-breaking series of discussion papers on a food systems approach to public health policy, and giving hundreds of presentations to university classes, and environmental and community groups.
- Championing the Toronto Food Charter, a declaration of citizen rights and government responsibilities that sets the food security standard for municipalities.
- Publishing two email services on food system issues, one dealing with local food and one with global.

== See also ==
- Community-based economics
- Food security
- Wayne Roberts
