= Hobby farm =

Farm maintained for recreational purposes

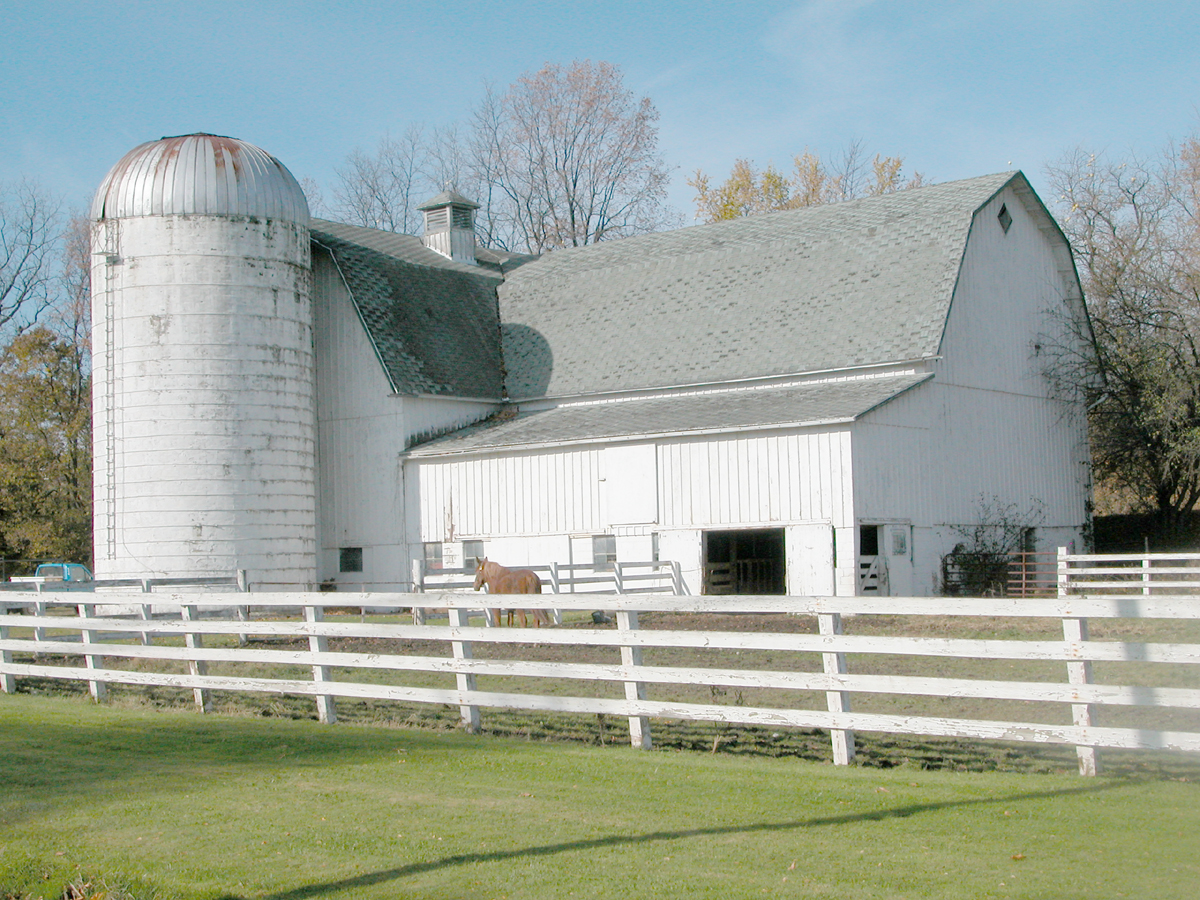
An old dairy farm used as a hobby farm near Leicester, New York

A hobby farm (also called a lifestyle block, acreage living, or rural residential) is a smallholding or small farm that is maintained without expectation of being a primary source of income. Some are held simply to bring homeowners closer to nature, to provide recreational land for horses, or as working farms for secondary income.

== Hobby farms globally ==
Hobby farms are agricultural land smaller than a fully-fledged farm. In contrast to their small size, hobby farms generate the largest share of overall crop production, with 29% of agricultural product for humans, animals, and fuel being produced by farms a maximum of 2 hectares in size, generating 32% of food available globally. Research suggests that due to globalization, climate change, and a decrease in land access particularly within the US, smallholdings are becoming less available to young farmers, with the median age of hobby farmers being 60 worldwide.

The size of a hobby farm can vary greatly from one country or region to the next depending on the level of urbanization and land access. The size of a smallholding in Brazil is typically less than 500 hectares (1235 acres), while in America a smallholding is typically categorized as being less than 20 hectares (50 acres). Despite this, 84% of all farms on a global scale consist of less than 2 hectares (5 acres).

== By country ==
=== Australia ===
Rural residential living in Australia consists of very large home sites usually on the outskirts of an urban area. Often subdivisions of former farms, these blocks of land are primarily used for residential purposes by people who enjoy the countryside or have hobbies and interests (e.g. gardening, horses, collecting and restoring old vehicles) which require more land than a normal suburban block, or by those who simply prefer the privacy of very-low-density living. Occupiers of rural residential properties generally accept that there will be a lower level of amenities available to them locally (e.g. shopping centres, public transport) and are prepared to travel further to access such amenities.

=== United Kingdom ===
In the UK, country living is becoming a pastime rather than an occupation. The number of farms in England with "no economic output" in recent surveys jumped in one year from 90,000 to 115,000, while the number of large farms fell to only 15,000.

Willy Newlands, author of Hobby Farm (Souvenir Press, London, 2006), says: "Hobby agriculture covers a wide spectrum, from backyard eggs-and-jam to large areas of grazing land. The main planks on which a definition can be made are money and labour: the hobby farmer's income is largely made from off-farm work and the holding does not employ full-time labour.

"There is a blurred line between the smallholder/crofter and the hobby farmer, although my own definition would be 'a smallholder tries to make money on his land, a hobby farmer spends money on his land.' Mainly, it’s a matter of attitude. The nouveau farmer is, above all, enjoying himself."

=== United States ===
In the U.S., a high proportion of farms might be classed as hobby farms. In 2007, over 40% of farms reported less than $2500 in income and over 10% of farms had less than 10 acres (4.0 hectares) of land. Over 50% of primary farm operators reported that their main income was a job outside of their farm; although, this figure includes some farm operators who do not personally participate in farming and some quite large and productive farms.

In the US, as farms grow in size, older farms become less economically viable. Some are purchased and most of the land is combined with larger nearby farms, however, the large farm has little use for the buildings. These can be sold off with only a building lot of real estate, but are much more saleable if a modest area, 5 to 15 acres (20,000 to 60,000 m²) is sold along with them.

Some, especially in developed areas, are used as truck gardens, with their own produce stands, or a regular stall in a local farmer's market.

=== Canada ===
Canadian hobby farms are exempt from certain taxes and regulations applied to commercial farms; however, there are stipulations for what does and does not make an acreage a hobby farm. Hobby farmers are evaluated by the Government of Canada to determine whether they are a commercial or pleasure farm based on criteria from a test. Some criterion includes the amount of money a business makes, which should be under $10,000 annual net income for a hobby farm, the number of employees, time spent on the farm in comparison to time spent gathering primary income, and whether the farm is run in a businesslike or commercial manner.

The majority of hobby farms in Canada are based in Ontario and British Columbia. Hobby farming in Canada has quickly gained popularity over the last few decades as both a means of generating additional revenue and for the enjoyment of Canadians. 40% of hobby farmers in Canada have reported a positive net income as of a 1998 census. The size of these farms appears to be gradually decreasing due in part to increasing urban sprawl and inaccessibility of large plots of land to the average Canadian, however the median income earned by these farms has increased by 144.4% in 2016, making these small farms more profitable than ever before.

== See also ==
- Allotment gardens
- Asset-Based Community Development
- Community Food Security Coalition
- Community gardens
- Gentleman farmer
- Special Rural Properties, Western Australia
- Sustainable agriculture
- Permaculture
