= Food policy =

Area of public policy

Food policy is the area of public policy concerning how food is produced, processed, distributed, purchased, or provided. Food policies are designed to influence the operation of the food and agriculture system balanced with ensuring human health needs. This often includes decision-making around production and processing techniques, marketing, availability, utilization, and consumption of food, in the interest of meeting or furthering social objectives. Food policy can be promulgated on any level, from local to global, and by a government agency, business, or organization. Food policymakers engage in activities such as regulation of food-related industries, establishing eligibility standards for food assistance programs for the poor, ensuring safety of the food supply, food labeling, and even the qualifications of a product to be considered organic.

Rice

Most food policy is initiated at the domestic level for purposes of ensuring a safe and adequate food supply for the citizenry. In a developing nation, there are three main objectives for food policy: to protect the poor from crises, to develop long-run markets that enhance efficient resource use, and to increase food production that will in turn promote an increase in income.

Food policy comprises the mechanisms by which food-related matters are addressed or administered by governments, including international bodies or networks, and by public institutions or private organizations. Agricultural producers often bear the burden of governments' desire to keep food prices sufficiently low for growing urban populations. Low prices for consumers can be a disincentive for farmers to produce more food, often resulting in hunger, poor trade prospects, and an increased need for food imports.

In a more developed country such as the United States, food and nutrition policy must be viewed in context with regional and national economic concerns, environmental pressures, maintenance of a social safety net, health, encouragement of private enterprise and innovation, and an agrarian landscape dominated by fewer, larger mechanized farms. Industrialized countries strive to ensure that farmers earn relatively stable incomes despite price and supply fluctuations and adverse weather events. The cost of subsidizing farm incomes is passed along to consumers in the form of higher food prices.

== History ==
=== History of food policy within the U.S. federal government ===
The history of food policy in the United States started in the 1880s with policies being carried out by the U.S. Department of Agriculture. In 1883, Harvey W. Wiley, M.D., was appointed chief chemist at USDA. Wiley devoted his career to raising public awareness of problems with adulterated food; developing standards for food processing; and campaigning for the Pure Food and Drug Act, also known as the "Wiley Act". For much of the 1880s, policymakers discussed how to deal with diseased livestock being imported into or exported out of the United States. In 1884, the USDA Bureau of Animal Industry (BAI) was created with the purpose of ensuring that diseased livestock could not be used as food. In 1890, the BAI was charged also with testing meats being exported from the U.S. and ensuring these were disease-free. In 1906, the Pure Food and Drug Act and the Federal Meat Inspection Act (FMIA) were both signed into law. Both prevent production and sale of adulterated or misbranded foods, the Pure Food and Drug Act focusing on general foods, and FMIA focusing on meats.

The Bureau of Chemistry, which was charged with enforcing the Pure Food and Drug Act, was reorganized in 1927, becoming the Food, Drug, and Insecticide Administration, and eventually came to be called the Food and Drug Administration (FDA) in 1931. In 1938, the Federal Food, Drug, and Cosmetic Act was passed by Congress, giving the FDA authority to set food safety standards. The FDA was reorganized to be under the direction of the Department of Health and Human Services in 1940. The Agricultural Marketing Act (AMA) was passed in 1946, allowing inspection of exotic and game animals on a pay-by-case basis, and giving the USDA the authority to inspect, certify and identify the class, quality and condition of agricultural products.

In 1953, with large-scale reorganization in the USDA, the BAI and Bureau of Dairy were abolished, among other bureaus, and their duties were transferred to the Agricultural Research Service (ARS). The Poultry Products Inspection Act was passed in 1957. This ensured that poultry products shipped in interstate commerce as well as those products being imported into the U.S. were continually inspected for diseases, and that product labels are accurate. In 1958, the Food, Drug and Cosmetic Act of 1938 was amended to include the Food Additive Amendment, addressing concerns over invisible hazards from chemicals added to the foods. Also, the Humane Methods of Slaughter Act was passed in 1958. In 1978, this act was amended to ensure that all meat that was inspected by the FSIS to be used for human consumption was humanely slaughtered.

In 1965, reorganization of the ARS' Consumer and Marketing Service brought federal meat and poultry inspection into one program. In 1967, the Wholesome Meat Act amended the FMIA, and in 1968, the Wholesome Poultry Act amended the PPIA, both requiring states to conduct inspection programs at least as stringent as federal inspections. The Egg Products Inspection Act (EPIA), passed in 1970, ensured the continuous inspection of the processing of egg products. In 1995, this task was taken over by FSIS, and the FDA took responsibility for shell egg products. In 1977, following several changes in organization, the Food Safety and Quality Service, renamed the Food Safety and Inspection Service (FSIS) in 1981, was created to perform meat and poultry grading.

Following an E. coli outbreak in 1993, inspections began to rely more on scientific tests as opposed to the usual sensory-based inspections. FSIS pushed research of Hazard Analysis and Critical Control Points (HACCP). In 1996, the Pathogen Reduction/HACCP Systems were issued, ensuring that illness-causing pathogens are reduced on raw products. Now, while the industry must ensure they are using safe practices, the government is ultimately responsible for setting safety standards and enforcing those standards through inspections and regulation.

While food safety concerns may have motivated some of the earliest food policy initiatives, public policies developed around other forms of consumer protections during the latter half of the 20th century, including food labeling and dietary guidance. The role of poverty in food insecurity as well as agricultural concerns have also contributed to the food policy landscape and debate in the United States in recent decades.

=== History of food policy outside of the U.S. federal government ===
The primary international agency with a focus on food policy is the Food and Agriculture Organization (FAO) of the United Nations, established in 1945 with four express purposes: to improve nutrition and living standards in member nations, improve the efficiency of production and distribution of all food and agricultural products, better the conditions of rural populations, and expand the world economy in such a way that it would ensure humanity's freedom from hunger. In 1974, FAO hosted the first World Food Conference in Rome and adopted a "Universal Declaration on the Eradication of Hunger and Malnutrition". In the aftermath, numerous public and private efforts were launched to better understand the agricultural, economic, social, climatological, and geo-political contributors to hunger. Organizations such as the International Food Policy Research Institute were founded to fund research designed to lead to "sustainable solutions for ending hunger and poverty" and annually produces a Global Food Policy Report. Policy-makers seek to better understand how economic principles govern supply and demand and how supply and demand influence food security, first defined in the 1970s as "the ability to meet food needs in a consistent way," though the definition continues to evolve.

Food policies evolve as nations improve their economic condition, moving from an economy based on isolated, self-sufficient rural farming to one based on trade and the development of a wider variety of goods and services offered. Urbanization, population growth, and shifting health concerns affect the way food policy is approached. The following table adapted from Simon Maxwell and Rachel Slater succinctly describes the evolutionary shift in food policies internationally.

	Food policy "old"	Food policy "new"
Population	Mostly rural	Mostly urban
Rural jobs	Mostly agricultural	Mostly non-agricultural
Employment in the food sector	Mostly in food production and primary marketing	Mostly in food manufacturing and retail
Actors in food marketing	Grain traders	Food companies
Supply chain	Short - small number of food miles	Long - large number of food miles
Typical food preparation	Mostly food cooked at home	High proportion of pre-prepared meals, food eaten out
Typical food	Basic staples, unbranded	Processed food, branded products; More animal products
Packaging	Low	High
Purchased food bought from	Local stall, shops, open markets	Supermarkets
Food safety issues	Pesticide poisoning of field workers; toxins associated with poor storage	Pesticide residues in food; adulteration; bio-safety issues in processed foods (salmonella, listeriosis)
Nutrition problems	Under-nutrition	Chronic dietary diseases (obesity, heart disease, diabetes)
Nutrient issues	Micronutrients	Fat; sugar
Food insecure	"Peasants"	Urban and rural poor
Main sources of national food shocks	Poor rainfall and other production shocks	International price and other trade problems
Main sources of national food shocks	Poor rainfall and other production shocks	Income shocks causing food poverty
Remedies for household food shortage	Safety nets, food-based relief	Social protection, income transfers
Fora for food policy	Ministries of agriculture, relief/rehabilitation, health	Ministries of trade and industry, consumer affairs; food activist groups; NGOs
Focus of food policy	Agricultural technology, parastatal reform, supplementary feeding, food for work	Competition and rent-seeking in the value chain, industrial structure in the retail sector, futures markets, waste management, advertising, health education, food safety
Key international institutions	FAO, WFP, UNICEF, WHO, CGIAR	FAO, UNIDO, ILO, WHO, WTO

== Food policies and population health in a global setting ==
Historically, food policy was generally linked to the health of a population, however food and fiber production can play roles in biofuels, animal feed, planetary health and other major systems and structures. The early literature in under-nutrition involving developing countries was concerned with the effects of food shortage practices on spreading diseases such as marasmus and kwashiorkor. With increases in food production, consumption of energy-dense foods (those high in added sugars, solid fats), and the reduction of physical activity, there has been an increase in the prevalence of obesity in most developed countries, especially in middle income families, and in developing countries. Such issues are receiving greater attention from decision makers, employers, and health economists in part because of the loss of worker productivity, increased absenteeism, decreased ability for young adults to enter the military, and the life-time costs of treating associated conditions such as diabetes and hypertension. Also, these policies aided gains in life expectancy achieved in the last few decades but those are being eroded of late due to obesity and chronic diseases.

From the standpoint of policy makers, the diets of lower income families within developing countries need to contain higher quantities of nutrients such as dietary protein, iron, calcium, vitamin A, and vitamin C, in relation to overall energy intake. By contrast, food policies for developed countries should encourage lower consumption of energy-dense foods such as those high in dietary fat and added sugars, while promoting higher intakes of fruits, vegetables, whole grains per dietary fiber for improving health.

== Food policy in the United Kingdom ==
The Food Policy Institute is in London., and the government regulates the food industry through the Food Standards Agency.

British universities carry out research into food policy

- City University, in London, has the Centre for Food Policy which runs the Food Research Collaboration
- Liverpool has the Food Policy Research Programme at the Institute of Population Health
- Nottingham has the Nottingham Centre for Food Policy and Foresight, which is part of the Food Systems Institute

== Food policy in the United States ==
In the United States, food policy decisions are made by government entities at the federal, state, territorial, tribal, and local level. The primary arenas of federal involvement in food policy include agriculture, nutrition assistance, food safety, dietary guidance, and labeling. Industry initiatives and the work of advocacy organizations that affect food policy are also addressed in this section. Most food policies are developed incrementally, often in reaction to changed circumstances, political climates, or needs.

=== Governance ===
All three branches of the federal government play a role in the formulation of food policy in the United States.

==== Executive Branch ====
The Food and Drug Administration (FDA) is the federal agency that is responsible for ensuring the safety of food products, with the exception of meat, poultry, and processed eggs. The various offices within the FDA carry out the agency's unified food program that protects and promotes the public health through the following activities:

- Ensuring the safety of foods for humans, including food additives and dietary supplements, by setting science-based standards for preventing foodborne illness and ensuring compliance with these standards
- Ensuring the safety of animal feed and the safety and effectiveness of animal drugs, including the safety of drug residues in human food derived from animals
- Protecting the food and feed supply from intentional contamination
- Ensuring that food labels are truthful and contain reliable information consumers can use to choose healthy diets.

MyPlate has been developed to take the place of the widely known food pyramid. MyPlate illustrates the proportions of each food group which should be present at each meal.

The Centers for Disease Control and Prevention (CDC) has a variety of public health programs that support state and local health departments, universities, and community-based organizations to implement healthy food nutrition standards in community settings such as early care and education, schools, park and recreation centers, worksites, and hospitals and to support community access through healthy food retail strategies.

The United States Department of Agriculture (USDA) has a broad range of interests involved in food policy.

The Food Safety and Inspection Service (FSIS) is responsible for making sure that the United States' commercial supply of meat, poultry, and egg products is safe, wholesome, and correctly labeled and packaged.

The Food and Nutrition Service (FNS) focuses on helping children and needy families get proper nutrition through food assistance programs and nutrition education. Two widely known programs within FNS are the Supplemental Nutrition Assistance Program (SNAP) and the National School Lunch Program (NSLP).

The Center for Nutrition Policy and Promotion (CNPP) works to improve the health and well-being of Americans by developing and promoting dietary guidance that links scientific research to the nutrition needs of consumers. The widely accepted food pyramid was used as part of this dietary guidance, but more recently MyPlate has been developed to show proper nutrition practices in reference to a place setting. The food groups of fruits, vegetables, grains, protein foods, and dairy are each allotted a certain amount of space on the plate, showing the public the proportional amounts of each food they should be eating during each meal.

The National Organic Program (NOP) regulates the standards for any farm that wants to sell an agricultural product as being organically produced. In order for the agricultural product to be labeled organic, synthetic fertilizers, sewage sludge, irradiation, and genetic engineering may not be used. Additionally, any animal product that is labeled organic must follow guidelines that the livestock living conditions, health care practice and feed follow organic specifications.

USDA has also taken significant steps to reduce food waste in the U.S. Food waste is approximated to be 30 to 40 percent of the food supply and translates to about 133 billion pounds and $161 billion worth of food as reported by USDA's Economic Research Service. The USDA, EPA, and FDA signed a formal agreement in 2018 to work together to educate consumers, engage partner and stakeholders, and design and monitor solutions to reduce food loss and waste.

==== Legislative Branch ====
With authority over the nation's annual budget, Congress also plays a role in the formulation of food policies, particularly around issues related to farming and nutrition assistance. In the House of Representatives, the Committee on Agriculture is the lead player; in the Senate, it is the Committee on Agriculture, Nutrition and Forestry. The budget and appropriations committees of each house also play a role. When a program or policy is subject to mandatory spending requirements, meaning that congressional budget committees must fully fund the program for all who meet eligibility criteria, it is the authorizing agriculture committees in both houses that have the power to define the scope of eligibility for the programs. Programs that are not considered mandatory are considered discretionary spending programs, and power over the bottom line is in the hands of the appropriations committees of each house charged with setting annual spending levels.

==== Judicial Branch ====
The U.S. Supreme Court has been involved in numerous decisions that have affected food policy around trade and patent concerns, food safety, and labeling. A more systematic and aggressive use of the court system to challenge practices that are linked to obesity has been proposed. Examples include initiating lawsuits against real estate developers who do not include recreational facilities in their designs, school boards that allow exclusive vending rights to soft drink companies, and manufacturers of non-nutritious foods.

== Elements of federal food policy ==
=== The farm bill ===
The latest farm bill was signed into law on 20 December 2018 and will expire in 2023. A large amount of U.S. spending occurs to support food security, support food, fiber, and energy production, and an ample human food supply chain through twelve titles including nutrition assistance and farm subsidy programs. The farm bill that is authorized and appropriated approximately every five years. The farm bill authorizes activities through two spending approaches, mandatory and discretionary. Mandatory spending programs operate as entitlements and are paid for using multiple year budget estimates when the bill is enacted, whereas programs with discretionary designation require additional action by congress to receive funding.

Briefly the farm bill titles include:

- Title I, Commodity Programs: Provides support for major commodity crops, including corn, soybeans, wheat, peanuts, rice, dairy, and sugar, as well as disaster assistance.
- Title II, Conservation: Encourages environmental stewardship of farmlands and improved management through land retirement and/or working lands programs.
- Title III, Trade: Supports U.S. agricultural export programs and international food assistance programs.
- Title IV, Nutrition: Provides nutrition assistance for low-income individuals and households through programs such as the Supplemental Nutrition Assistance Program (SNAP).
- Title V, Credit: Offers direct government loans to farmers/ranchers and guarantees on private lenders' loans.
- Title VI, Rural Development: Supports rural business and community development.
- Title VII, Research, Extension, and Related Matters: Supports agricultural research and extension programs.
- Title VIII, Forestry: Supports forestry management programs by USDA's Forest Service.
- Title IX, Energy: Encourages the development of farm and community renewable energy systems through various programs.
- Title X, Horticulture: Supports the production of specialty crops (fruits, vegetables), USDA-certified organic foods, and locally produced foods and authorizes establishing a regulatory framework for industrial hemp.
- Title XI, Crop Insurance: Management of federal crop insurance program.
- Title XII, Miscellaneous: Covers other programs and assistance, including support for new ranchers and farmers.

=== Agricultural concerns ===
Government interventions in the agricultural economy influence the quantities produced and price of food. A number of different instruments are used to incentivize farmers to grow crops and buffer them through difficult economic or weather cycles, including price supports, supply controls, deficiency payments, direct payments, insurance, and demand expansion. The United States farm bill specifies the type of policy instruments that will be funded in a given cycle and at what cost. Subsidies to farming interests, determined primarily by the farm, are expected to cost $223 billion over the 10-year period from 2013 to 2022, according to the Congressional Research Service (CRS). Crop insurance is the most expensive of the federal farm subsidies, followed by conservation policies and commodity supports. Representatives and senators from states that receive the lion's share of farm subsidies often dominate the committees on agriculture in the House and Senate. Agricultural economics plays an increasingly larger role in the understanding of both domestic and global food trade policy decisions.

The primary demand expansion program supported by the federal government through the Department of Agriculture is known as the commodity checkoff program. It is responsible for a series of advertising campaigns with aims to create higher demand for commodity products such as milk, beef, pork, and eggs. Familiar slogans from these campaigns include "Got Milk?"; "Pork. The Other White Meat"; and "The Incredible, Edible Egg". Checkoff programs do not exist for some of the healthier foods grown and produced in the U.S., including poultry, fish, and whole grains, and marketing support for produce is very minimal.

In recent decades, policy makers have come under increased pressure to balance the interests of traditional farming in the United States and issues around organic farming, regenerative agriculture, the environmental impact of agriculture, food vs. fuel, and international food security concerns. The USDA has a variety of programs, policies, and activities that impact and relate to sustainable agriculture, natural resources, and community development including food security.

=== Nutrition assistance ===
Ensuring adequate food for families and individuals is also a centerpiece of national food policy efforts. In the United States where most state minimum wages have not been updated to provide what some groups deem a "livable wage", food assistance programs help provide food resources to individuals and families through monthly assistance. This primarily takes the form of monthly benefits that are calculated based on family income, adjusted for certain deductible living expenses and household size, and can only be used for the purchase of foods. The program known for decades as "food stamps" was revamped and renamed Supplemental Nutrition Assistance Program (SNAP) in 2008 to acknowledge the change from paper food stamps to electronic benefit transfer or EBT cards. SNAP is a mandatory spending program; the government must designate funds for the program sufficient to cover benefits for all who meet the eligibility requirements. The farm bill also authorizes funding for SNAP and other nutrition assistance programs that form a social safety net, projected to be at $772 billion over the 10-year-period from 2013 to 2022. In 2020, the USDA also created a COVID-19 food assistance program.

==== Children ====
The nutritional needs of children is important component of nutrition assistance in the United States. In fiscal year 2017, children younger than age 5 accounted for 13.4 percent of participants and school-age children accounted for 30.0 percent of participants of USDA's Supplemental Nutrition Assistance Program (SNAP) benefits, a program for low-income Americans. Over the past ten years, children's share of SNAP has fallen from 49.1 percent in fiscal year 2007 to 43.4 percent in fiscal year 2017.

In addition, the Special Supplemental Nutrition Program for Women, Infants and Children (WIC) is an effort to ensure the healthcare and nutrition needs of pregnant and lactating low-income women and their children under the age of five. In 2017, approximately 14.1 million women and children were eligible to receive benefits from WIC at any time. Of that group, 7.2 million people participated in the program, or a usage rate of 51 percent. Approximately 6.4 million people took part in 2019.

The National School Lunch Act created the National School Lunch Program in 1946 to ensure that low-income children received a fully or partially subsidized meal in the middle of their school day. Revisions to the program were made under President Lyndon B. Johnson with the enactment of the Child Nutrition Act, which integrated the school lunch programming with the Special Milk Program and launched a new national School Breakfast Program. Numerous studies have confirmed a link between school performance and the school breakfast program. More recently, the Healthy, Hunger-Free Kids Act of 2010 was signed into law by President Barack Obama and serves to reauthorize expenditures on food programming for children. Nutrition standards for school breakfasts and lunches were revised for the first time in 15 years through the passage of the act to align them more closely with healthy foods recommended by the Dietary Guidelines for Americans. The federal government had faced increased pressure to improve the nutritional quality of meals served in public schools over the last several decades from a wide range of advocacy groups with a goal of aligning the foods served with the Dietary Guidelines for Americans which are based on scientific research showing the benefits of whole grains, fruits, and vegetables and reductions in added sugars, refined grains, and sodium. Some of the pressure stemmed from federal efforts in the 1980s to broaden the definition of qualifying food groups.

During the COVID-19 pandemic of 2020, the U.S. government through the USDA created temporary emergency standards of eligibility and benefits under the Food and Nutrition Act of 2008. Due to the shuttering of schools or hybrid school delivery models, children who would normally receive free or reduced price meals (breakfast, lunch, and/dinner) under the Richard B. Russell National School Lunch Act at the school cafeteria, were deemed eligible for Pandemic EBT (P-EBT) under the national emergency provision. This allowed parents and caregivers to purchase foods from local markets and stores to ensure food security for their children using the P-EBT option.

==== Older Americans ====
Concerns about senior citizens living in poverty in the 1960s led to the establishment of the Elderly Nutrition Program (ENP) in 1972. This federally funded program provides grants to state and area agencies on aging to help finance the cost of congregate and home-delivered meals for older adults living independently in the community. The program is periodically re-authorized under the Older Americans Act and is administered by the U.S. Department of Health and Human Service's Administration on Aging. The primary activity funded under Title III is the preparation and serving of nutritious meals for adults over the age of 60 and their spouses. Title III-A provides funding for tribal organizations to provide similar meal services. The meals are distributed through two mechanisms: (1) delivered to the homes of seniors who are not mobile or have self-care challenges, and (2) served at a group meeting place such as a senior center, church, community hall or public school. Homebound seniors receive one meal per day (several fresh and frozen meals may be included in a single delivery), and communities that offer congregate meals are encouraged to offer a meal at least five times per week. Meals must meet Dietary Reference Intakes and USDA Dietary Guidelines for older adults. In 2011, the budget for Title III programs was $817.8 million and an estimated 2.6 million people were served. Grants are made by the Administration on Aging to state agencies and local area councils on aging that provide a variety of other services to their communities' seniors. The program relies heavily on volunteers; a savings of about 10% per meal is attributed to volunteer labor. Over the last 20 years, more funds were shifted from congregate meal support to home-delivered foods, often referred to as Meals on Wheels. While the aim of ENP is to target low-income elderly in cities as well as rural settings, there is no means test to use these services; drafters of the initial legislation wanted to limit barriers to use of the program by older adults.

==== Role of obesity in considering nutrition assistance ====
Nutrition assistance in the U.S. takes place in a unique context given the high prevalence of diet-related diseases such as diabetes, cancer, cardiovascular disease and high adiposity, or obesity, among adults and children. More than 40 percent of American adults aged 20 and older were considered having the disease of obesity in 2017-2018, and 12 percent of children aged 2 to 5 were classified as already having obesity. Studies have found some minor correlations between food insecurity and obesity among women, but findings regarding men and children have been inconsistent. A framework for using this information to inform policies surrounding food benefits has been proposed. The framework suggests that strategies for coping with the social, psychological, geographic, economical stresses of poverty and structural factors are central to the link between poverty and its impacts on healthy lifestyles such as less access to healthy affordable foods in neighborhoods (the term food swamps have been used to describe locations with high amounts of liquor retail, convenience stores and few grocery stores with produce and lean meats), less access to safe places for physical activity, poor access to quality healthcare to screen and counsel for food security and health, and unhealthy weight status.

==== Role of farmers' markets ====
A concern about lack of access to fresh produce for many recipients of SNAP benefits has led to an effort to increase the role farmers' markets can play in providing healthy fruits and vegetables to those receiving nutrition assistance. From 2005 to 2010, the number of farmers' markets authorized and equipped to manage SNAP transactions increased from 444 to 1,611. In 2019 there were over 3,500 farmers market locations across the country that accept SNAP benefits. In addition, the Senior Farmers' Market Nutrition Program provides funding for coupons given to needy older adults for use in local markets and roadside produce vendors approved by each state.

=== Food safety ===
In broad policy terms, food safety can be described as an attempt to limit contaminants in the food supply. Traditionally, contaminants of greatest concern were pathogens. According to 2011 estimates by the Centers for Disease Control and Prevention (CDC), 48 million people are sickened, 128,000 are hospitalized, and 3,000 die of foodborne diseases during each year. The top five offenders were norovirus, salmonella, Clostridium perfringens, Campylobacter spp., and Staphylococcus aureus.

The General Accounting Office has written numerous reports highlighting the dangers inherent in a fragmented approach to U.S. food safety. Federal regulation of food safety is split primarily among agencies in the Department of Health and Human Services and the Department of Agriculture, but some responsibilities are also delegated to the Environmental Protection Agency (EPA), the Department of Commerce, and the Department of Homeland Security. Within the Department of Health and Human Services, the Food and Drug Administration (FDA) is responsible for the safety of most food products with the exception of meat, poultry, and processed eggs. Animal drugs and livestock feed are also part of the FDA safety mandate, while outbreaks of foodborne illnesses are monitored and probed by the CDC. Within the USDA, the Food Safety and Inspection Service is charged with oversight of the safety, wholesomeness, and proper labeling of meat, poultry and processed eggs. Inspectors are required to be onsite at nearly every slaughterhouse in the nation when animals are being readied for human consumption. As a result, the FSIS has a larger annual budget and employs a much larger number of inspectors than the FDA, even though the FDA's mandate is much broader. Other USDA agencies with a role in food safety include the Animal and Plant Health Inspection Service (APHIS), which aims to prevent animal and plant diseases in domestic and imported products, and the Agricultural Marketing Service (AMS), a service whose primary function is to set quality, grades and marketing standards for dairy products, fruits, vegetables and meat.

The Food Safety Modernization Act (FSMA) was signed into law in 2011 and gives the FDA new authorities to regulate the way food is grown, harvested, and processed. It was developed in an effort to limit contamination in the food supply. There are seven major rules to implement FSMA that require specific actions that must be taken at different points along the supply chain to prevent contamination in human and animal food.

In addition to pathogens, chemical additives to food are of increasing concern to Americans. A critical concept related to chemical additives in food is known as generally recognized as safe or GRAS, a designation of the Food and Drug Administration for food substances that are exempt from safety testing. About 12,000 samples of fruits and vegetables available to U.S. consumers are collected each year and tested for residue from pesticides, and the results are published in an annual Pesticide Data Program (PDP) hosted by the USDA.

There are several types of policy instruments that can be used to try to remedy risks to health posed by the farming and processing of foods for consumption. The government can develop process rules that explicitly state which procedures are appropriate for handling particular foods. Performance standards set quality standards against which foods are measured, such as grades for meat or eggs. Food labeling rules, government-funded food safety research, and consumer education are additional tools. The potential for product liability lawsuits against manufacturers with poor safety practices offers another incentive for producers to take appropriate care when handling and processing foods.

=== Food labeling ===
==== FDA-regulated labeling ====
Food labeling requirements are spelled out in the Federal Food, Drug, and Cosmetic Act (abbreviated FFDCA, FDCA, or FD&C). Nutrition labeling is required for most prepared foods, and is voluntary for raw produce and fish. The most recognizable label is the nutrition facts label found on all prepared foods. This lists the suggested serving size followed by the amount per serving of calories, fat, cholesterol, sodium, carbohydrates, protein, and a list of some micronutrients found in the food. Ingredients are also included on the label, listed from the highest quantity to the lowest quantity.

There are also requirements for allergen labeling. According to the Food Allergen Labeling and Consumer Protection Act of 2004 (Public Law 108-282, Title II), 2% of adults and 5% of infants and children have food allergies, and 90% of these allergies are related to milk, eggs, fish, crustacean shellfish, tree nuts, peanuts, wheat, and soybeans. Labeling must contain a list of these major food allergens which are contained in the product, or which may have come in contact with the food during production.

==== USDA-regulated labeling ====
This seal is found on all food products that meet NOP regulations to be called "100% Organic" or "Organic".

According to the Organic Foods Production Act and the National Organic Program:

- A product can be labeled "100% Organic" if it contains only organic ingredients and processing aids.
- The label "Organic" is used for products containing at least 95% organic products.
- Products made up of at least 70% organic ingredients may be labeled "Made with organic ingredients".

==== Unregulated terms ====
Some factual labeling terms are not regulated with specificity but the USDA-FSIS may require producers to submit additional documentation to verify the claim. These terms include:

- No drugs or growth hormones used
- Free range / cage free
- Sustainably harvested

These terms are often used on labels to improve the product's marketability. The USDA-FSIS cannot approve false or misleading label claims.

=== Dietary guidance ===
A healthy diet is important for appropriate growth, development, optimal immune function, and metabolic health. However, many consumers report confusion due to conflicting nutrition information from different sources including scientific agencies, published books, the media, and social media. The Center for Nutrition Policy and Promotion within the U.S. Department of Agriculture and the Department of Health and Human Services are charged with reviewing the scientific literature and forging agreement on a series of food choices and behaviors that are compiled and issued every five years as the Dietary Guidelines for Americans. The 2020-2025 review is underway with the 2015-2020 Dietary Guidelines for Americans having been published in the fall of 2015. The general public is invited to submit comments to the advisory committee, which are published on the website of the Center for Nutrition Policy and Promotion. Comments submitted come from academic institutions, individual physicians, members of the public, and industries with a stake in the guidelines. For example, among those giving oral testimony to the committee that developed the 2010 guidelines were representatives of the sugar, fisheries, dairy, egg, pork, beef, soy foods, and produce industries. Others offering testimony included the Council for Responsible Nutrition, the University of Washington, the American Heart Association, The Cancer Project, the Institute of Food Technologists, and the Vegetarian Union of North America. While open to public input, the development of the dietary guidelines is an example of a food policy promulgated solely within the executive branch of the federal government.

For more than a decade, dietary guidelines were illustrated with a food pyramid, but the 2010 guidelines were accompanied by a new graphic, MyPlate. This graphic attempts to show proper nutrition practices in reference to a place setting. Five food groups - fruits, vegetables, grains, protein foods, and dairy - are drawn in ideal proportions for each meal. Periodic reports from government agencies, surveys, and studies indicate that the U.S. population fails to meet the government's dietary guidelines. Americans eat insufficient quantities of fruits and vegetables and consume too many highly processed foods high in unhealthy solid fats, added sugars, and consume unhealthy amounts of alcohol. As with nutritional assistance, dietary guidelines are formulated in an environment that is increasingly aware of the health risks faced by the nation due to the growing number of individuals with diet-attributable diseases including obesity, Type 2 diabetes, cardiovascular disease, and certain cancers. While the field of nutrition and public health works closely with a social ecological model that places individual behavior determinants and choices in the context of his or her familial, community, societal contexts including marketing, retail access, and larger agricultural policy, the Dietary Guidelines for Americans are directed at individual behaviors around food, nutritional intake and physical activity. They are however translated into nutrition standards for venues serving or offering foods such as workplaces (e.g. food service guidelines), childcare, and schools (see section on children).

== Policy proponents (non-U.S. government) ==
=== Advocacy and coalitions ===
Every citizen of the United States could be described as a stakeholder in food policy, but farming and food industry interests are generally the dominant players when advocating for and against legislation and regulation at the federal level; public health advocates and consumer interest groups also play a role. Action by the federal government on food policy is often more important to farmers and food manufacturers or distributors because their income is derived from these economic activities, whereas consumers in the U.S. spend only about 10 percent of their income on food. This generally makes farmers or food industry executives easier to organize around policy issues than the public at large.

Non-profit organizations that accept charitable donations and are organized under section 501(c)(3) of the Internal Revenue Service Code are limited in the funds they can spend on lobbying activities under the code, while profit-making businesses and trade associations do not face the same restrictions. As a result, some charitable groups with a stake in U.S. food policy decisions create a separate organization for lobbying purposes and devise a funding mechanism that does not include tax-deductible charitable contributions. Funds spent by industry and other interest groups on lobbying and political campaigns are tracked and made publicly available by OpenSecrets.

=== Food policy councils ===
Many food policy councils (FPCs) bring together a variety of stakeholders to identify food and nutrition security concerns, explore solutions, prioritize equitable approaches, and plan the types of policies needed within a jurisdiction to support the nutrition needs of the public along with ways to support local farmers and producers, processors, distributors, grocers/retailers, and other members of the food system. They may work to educate the public and food sector members, shape public policy, and even create new programs. Many states, regions, cities and other organizations have formed their own FPCs. Some of these FPCs are commissioned by the government, while others are collaborative efforts by grassroots organizations. The earliest grassroots food policy councils were the City of Hartford Advisory Commission on Food Policy established in 1991 and the Marin Food Policy Council established in 1998. The Johns Hopkins Center for a Livable Future' s Food Policy Networks (FPN) project supports the development of FPCs as well as provides them with tools to help capacity and skill building to create effective councils across the United States. The FPN project also has a site with an online directory and map of existing FPCs.

=== Food industry initiatives ===
Not all policies involving food in the public marketplace originate within government. The food industry has also set standards for itself from time to time. Often, these voluntary efforts stem from industry concerns that they may face heavier or piecemeal regulations from federal or state regulators to improve the quality of food products or food marketing.

==== Facts Up Front ====
Facts Up Front is an initiative by the Grocery Manufacturers Association (GMA) that is designed to simplify nutrition information on products with a front-of-package (FOP) label that highlights the calories, saturated fat, sodium, and sugars in a single serving of an item. Initially called "Nutrition Keys", the industry took this action at a time when federal agencies expressed concerns about the potential for consumer confusion stemming from competing attempts to simplify nutrition information on packaged goods. Congress and the Centers for Disease Control charged the Institute of Medicine with conducting a study with an eye toward recommendations to standardize these labels, and a report was issued in October 2011. The GMA initiative was launched in January 2011, and compliance is voluntary.

==== Children's Food and Beverage Advertising Initiative ====
Launched in 2007, this voluntary effort called for food manufacturers to set nutritional criteria for food products they advertise during children's programming. Organized through the Better Business Bureau, the initiative was widely criticized by advocates for federal regulation of advertising to children. A scorecard developed by the Rudd Center for Food Policy and Obesity at Yale University to track changes in the advertising of cereal to children was issued in 2012 and covered changes during the period of 2008 to 2011. Among the findings: total media spending to advertise child-targeting cereals had increased 34 percent, cereal company spending on Spanish-language TV more than doubled in that time period, two cereal companies launched new advertising in video games or advergame websites, and the majority of cereals children see advertised on television consist of one-third or more sugar. Overall nutrition had improved for 13 of 16-targeted brands, and preschoolers' exposure the cereal advertising declined by 6 percent. An updated review was published in 2017 including the context that in 2016, more than 20,300 food, beverage, and restaurant companies spent approximately $13.5 billion in advertising in all media. The report found that the number of food-related TV ads seen by kids declined from 2007 to 2016 by 4% for preschoolers (ages 2–5), 11% for children aged 6–11, and 14% for young teens aged 12–14. However, exposure to food-related TV advertising by children aged 2–14 continued to average 10 to 11 ads per day in 2016, or approximately 4,000 ads for the year.

== Food politics ==
As with other actors in the public policy arena, food policy makers must account for a variety of political, social, environmental and economic agendas that affect a nation's food supply. Food politics, both domestically and internationally, play an important role in agenda setting, rule making, and implementation. Politics come into play on a variety of different fronts as the needs of the populace to have reliable, safe, affordable access to food are balanced against the desire to ensure farmers can earn a viable living.

== Criteria table ==
A food system can be judged by whether it
is technically efficient in social prices	is good for nutrition	offers security
is allocatively efficient in social prices	supports higher standards of education	reduces vulnerability
leads to increased consumption by the poor	enables people to have status	is good for environmental sustainability
leads to increased asset-holding by the poor	enables people to have dignity	promotes equality in general
is good for health	enables people to have rights	promotes social inclusion
promotes gender equality	enables people to have influence	underpins freedom

== Conflicts ==
Food policy has both political and economic factors that contribute to the challenges it faces. Food policy is not completely based on politics, but politics have an impact. Countries that have more political involvement typically have more of an influence on solving issues dealing with hunger and poverty. Countries that have less political involvement may not have as much to do with food policy.

The solution to hunger is complex but can include having ample nutritious food intake per individual. The amount to increase by depends on how much food is needed to carry out day-to-day tasks and to optimize body systems. Some challenges that this solution faces are: having enough money to afford the cost of food, having the food supply, and having a sufficient supply of nutritional foods. Also, having the education on what foods to buy and which are nutritional can be an issue (nutrition literacy). These are all factors that can cause a food policy to fail.

Food policy involves both consumers and producers. If prices are too high for consumers to afford nutritional food products, then it reduces the amount they can purchase. High food prices can cause lower-income households to have a poorer quality diet. Producers rely on food prices for income and therefore cannot make the prices so low that they are not able to survive. There is a fine line between supply and demand, which creates a challenge for food policy.

== See also ==
- Advertising to children
- Agricultural Act of 2014
- Agricultural subsidy
- Food
- Food industry
- Food systems
- Global health
- International Food Policy Research Institute
- Let's Move!
- Nutrition
- Toronto Food Policy Council
- 2007–08 world food price crisis
