= San Damiano College =

Location
- Yarrabilba, Logan City, Queensland; Australia; 27.810207°S 153.117197°E

Information
- Type: Co-education, secondary
- Motto: "We Are One In Love"
- Denomination: Catholic
- Established: 2021
- Principal: Peter Edwards
- Grades: 7–11 (currently)
- Enrolment: estimated 320 (2024)
- Website: sandamianocollege.qld.edu.au

San Damiano College is an independent, Roman Catholic, co-educational, high school, located in the City of Logan locality of Yarrabilba, in Queensland, Australia. It is administered by the Queensland Catholic Education Commission, with an enrolment of 239 students and a teaching staff of 25, as of 2023. The school served students from Year 7 to Year 9 in 2023, it currently serves students from Year 7 to Year 11 and will serve students from Year 7 to Year 12 by 2026.

== History ==
In November 2019, Brisbane Catholic Education revealed the plans surrounding the school, including its commencement date in 2021. After construction was completed in 2020, the school officially opened on 10 February 2021, with 75 Year 7 foundation students.
