= Community food security =

Community food security (CFS) is a relatively new concept that captures emerging ideas about the central place of food in communities. At times it refers to the measure of food access and availability at the community level, and at other times to a goal or framework for place-based food systems. It builds upon the more commonly understood concept of food security, which refers to food access and availability at an individual or household level (in health and social policy, for instance) and at a national or global level (e.g., in international development and aid work). Hamm and Bellows (2003) define CFS as “a situation in which all community residents obtain a safe, culturally acceptable, nutritionally adequate diet through a sustainable food system that maximizes community self-reliance and social justice” (p. 37). CFS involves social, economic, and institutional factors, and their interrelationships within a community that impact availability and access to resources to produce food locally. It takes into account environmental sustainability and social fairness through measures of the availability and affordability of food in that community relative to the financial resources available to purchase or produce it.

== CFS' global scale ==
In industrialized countries, income-related food security is measured at both the individual and household levels whereas in non-industrialized countries it is most often measured in terms of under-nutrition and malnutrition through anthropometric measurements. Indicators of individual food insecurity include limited food selection, suboptimal nutrient intakes and severe nutrient inadequacies. Household food insecurity measures food intake of adults and children as a group within the home in relation to household income and food cost expenditure. Markers of vulnerability to food insecurity in Canada and U.S. include low income, reliance on welfare, lone motherhood, lack of home ownership, and Aboriginal status.

In Canada, food security is recognized as one of the most important social determinants of health and has been linked with increased prevalence of chronic diseases such as diabetes, hypertension, and cardiovascular disease. Those who are food insecure most often live in poverty and have great difficulty obtaining the food needed to manage chronic diseases like the ones mentioned previously. Achieving individual and household food security is key to achieving CFS. Whereas individual and household food security can be achieved through use of social policies to improve income distribution, CFS can be attained through food policy. By directly addressing the causes of individual and household food insecurity through social policies, improved access to food for all can exist and in turn improve the health of that community. Moreover, citizens' direct involvement in the production of food, even at a small scale, has been shown to generate health benefits. In addition, achieving CFS can benefit social capital, justice, economic vitality, and sustainability of physical and social environments in that community, all of which contribute to population health.

Efforts to achieve CFS differ from other food security initiatives (e.g., nutrient supplementation or food assistance programs) in that they view the issue at a local level by concentrating on community infrastructure and local food systems, and vary according to different community needs. Hamm and Bellows purport that “food security is experienced most poignantly and addressed most innovatively at the community level” (p. 37). Some of the existing CFS initiatives, such as identifying food costs and quality in low-income neighbourhoods, also seek to provide the evidence needed to make changes in policy. This further improves the health of citizens by providing sufficient access to nutritious foods for all and improving access to resources needed to produce and process the food locally.

== History ==
The term food security was first used in the 1960-1970s to refer to food supply and consistent access to food in international development work. In 1966 the treaty titled the United Nations International Covenant on Economic, Social and Cultural Rights was created to ensure economic, social and cultural rights including the “inalienable right to adequate nutritious food”. In 1974 the World Food Conference focused on producing enough food for the world, ensuring the supply was reliable, and reducing dramatic price fluctuations. Even early on it was clear that there was a great discrepancy between the world's food supply and people's access to food. Advances in agricultural technology in non-industrialized countries resulting in production of more food did not necessarily result in improved food access as evidenced by the Green Revolution. Rather, many environmental problems such as insecticide-resistant pests, soil erosion, and pesticide poisoning of both people and wildlife resulted.

During the 1980s and 1990s food security became recognized as a major public health concern in industrialized countries. The concept of food entitlement was introduced in 1981 along with a shift in focus to ensured food access with adequate supply at the individual or household level in industrialized nations. Food security was measured directly by anthropometric means or by food intake assessment, and indirectly by indicators of poverty, comparison of wages to food costs, employment rates and the use of emergency food programs. At the 1996 World Food Summit, the Rome Declaration on World Food Security reaffirmed, “the right of everyone to have access to safe and nutritious food, consistent with the right to adequate food and the fundamental right of everyone to be free from hunger”. Throughout the 1980s and 1990s most responses to food insecurity tended to occur at the community level. Community-level initiatives allowed for more long-lasting solutions to food issues as they were designed to empower individuals and increase knowledge and skills as opposed to providing only a temporary solution to food access. These efforts contributed largely to the evolution of the concept of CFS in the 1990s when environmental concerns were gaining recognition. The emerging concept of CFS captured the central idea that addressing food security at the community level would allow more interested parties to become involved in the decision-making and planning process as well as enable a larger range of issues to be addressed such as environmentally sustainable food production, fair wages for local producers, and more sustainable food assistance programs.

== CFS dimensions ==
Measuring CFS is difficult due to its multifaceted nature and the complexity of the issue, a lack of standardized tools, and because of the diversity of needs across different communities. In order to better understand what influences CFS, the concept can be considered to comprise four key dimensions— personal and household food security, food environments, sustainability, and strength of local food system. It is important, however, to think of these four dimensions as interrelated and not discrete.

=== Personal and household food security ===
The Canadian Home Economics Association (1991) and the Centre for Studies in Food Security at Ryerson University have identified five preconditions for food security: availability, accessibility, adequacy, acceptability and agency. Availability refers to sufficient access to food; accessibility refers to physical and economic access to food; adequacy refers to safe and nutritious access to food in an environmentally sustainable manner; acceptability refers to culturally appropriate food that does not harm one's dignity, self-respect or human rights; and finally agency refers to the democratic processes involved in changing policies to enable food security. Originally the list created by the Canadian Home Economics Association only contained the first four. More recently several organizations around the world added the fifth A, agency. Agency is extremely important in CFS as it reflects community members’ ability to influence policy directly related to food security as both individuals and as a collective.

=== Food environments ===
CFS is largely determined by the overall well-being of a community including multiple economic and social factors within the food environment. The food environment refers to the many conditions that affect food choice and access. The following are examples of food environments that affect CFS.

- At the individual and household level one's personal values, income, and time available to prepare food, and overall capacity and resources to access and use food can greatly affect food consumption.
- One's social support networks such as friends and family can influence food choices and behaviours.
- The type of community one lives in, for example, whether it is a fishing community or an agriculturally rich community can greatly impact food selection.
- The setting at home, work or school can also influence food options. For example, food deserts are socially-distressed neighbourhoods that contain an abundance of fast food and junk food choices and limited access to nutritious foods, making it difficult for residents in this area to purchase healthy foods.
- In addition sectors such as the agricultural sector, food industry, government policies and programs, and both the local and global economy can influence food consumption within a community.

=== Sustainability ===
In order for a community to achieve CFS all citizens must be able to obtain food in a socially, economically, and environmentally sustainable way to maximize community self-reliance. Creating this situation involves growing food in an environmentally sustainable way and having fair liveable wages for local workers, producers, and processors so they can not only continue to produce food for the community but also participate in the system as members of the community. It also means that all members of the food system actively participate in the decision-making processes that influence the "availability, cost, price, quality, and attributes of their food."

The Community Food Security Coalition recognizes six major principles to increase the sustainability of the food system.

- Similar to the anti-hunger movement, CFS centers low-income food needs.
- Addressing a broad range of problems affecting the food system, such as community development, environmental racism, etc., encourages an interdisciplinary approach.
- Rather than only meeting the needs of individuals, CFS strives to improve the conditions of entire communities.
- CFS seeks to utilize individual and community assets to build power from within.
- An agricultural base provides a local food source for the community, while the community provides new markets for farmers.
- Maintaining a systems-oriented approach encourages solutions that address the root of the problem.

=== Strength of local food system ===
Although no community is completely self-sufficient, maximizing a community's self-reliance is extremely important for ensuring CFS. Having a self-reliant food system means that food is produced, processed, and controlled locally as much as possible; food sources are multiple and varied, and community members are involved in decision-making. Because unpredictable economic and environmental influences can greatly impact food systems, another important component of CFS is resilience - the ability of a system to withstand and adapt to change or disturbance. In a self-reliant food system, the ecological system is both protected and constantly improving. Resilience is an important component of CFS as unpredictable economic and environmental influences can greatly impact the food system. Resilience is an important component of CFS as unpredictable economic and environmental influences can greatly impact the food system. Ensuring diversity and multiplicity of food sources can help to increase resilience.

== Barriers to CFS ==
There are many barriers to CFS. These barriers relate to the complexity of the concept, the difficulty of data collection, and the lack of political will among those in power to make effective changes a reality.

=== Complexity ===
CFS is hard to define, difficult to measure, the understanding of it can vary across different community's needs, wants and values, and a community's capacity and power to achieve it also varies. CFS is also complex because it is tied up with intra-household dynamics, as well with the larger food environment and the strength of the local food system.

Understanding CFS requires seeing the food system as a whole, engaging a variety of actors across the system from producer to consumer/citizen, and, importantly, growing new “next practice solutions” to address ever emerging challenges. CFS is socially complex as it involves participation from individuals of various different perspectives and interests, as well as on multiple scales (e.g. local, national or international).

On the local scale, it is difficult to achieve CFS at both the household and community level. The economic status and economic power of a household may determine the difficulties of attaining CFS. For example, households may have limited opportunities for jobs with higher wages. Household food security is hard to achieve when it is aided solely by conventional food assistance approaches such as food pantries and federal assistance such as food stamps. Non-economic assistance, such as food distribution, carries stigma that may deter households from using them. Additionally, communities may be affected by the influence of corporations and lobbies over food policy, making CFS and changes to the food system more difficult.

Power dynamics are also an important factor in CFS. There are questions such as who has control over the market and economic resources, political power to pass policy to improve food access, and social power to come work together to make change. Race and class play a crucial role in the production, distribution, and consumption of food. Due to store availability, accessibility, and price, many low-income communities cannot meet the food needs required for CFS. Buying power, or lack of it, indicates who within the community has physical and economic access to food.

=== Collecting data ===
Due to the complexity of the issue, CFS is not easily measured and there is no standardized measurement tool. A proven and consistent measuring tool ensures validity when collecting data and makes it easier to monitor changes in food security status over time. However, because of the many differences between communities and the reality that communities change over time, it is important to have assessments and evaluation tools tailored to that specific community's needs at a given time. Limited standardization of CFS assessment can deter recognition of CFS as a major health and social concern.

=== Political will ===
Both policy and social change are essential to ensure solutions to CFS are implemented and sustainable. Providing political stakeholders with the research evidence needed to show the benefits of increased spending on social policies and programs to improve CFS is difficult. For example, showing that policy measures, such as increases in minimum wage or welfare benefits, can improve food security without strong supporting evidence can be challenging. It is clear that there is a need for more information to be shared with the public in the hopes of improving CFS and influencing policy change.

== Opportunities/Strategies ==
There are many opportunities and strategies that have been proposed and implemented across various communities that have helped to achieve CFS.

=== Community programs & capacity building ===
Community programs have proven to be an effective way to achieve CFS by overcoming barriers to food security. Community programs can offer short and long term approaches to CFS and can have a range of influence and effectiveness. For example, smaller short-term approaches include ensuring community members are aware of existing food assistance programs, social services, and job training workshops in their community. Evidence is limited that such programs effectively address barriers such as inadequate income.

To achieve more long-lasting solutions, changes in the food system of a community may be necessary. Connecting social services with the food system will strengthen partnerships across sectors and help to build capacity amongst community members. For example, connecting dietitians with farmers to create programs such as community supported agriculture (CSA) and place-based institutional procurement strategies can help both the health of the community and welfare of the farmers. Also, a shift in the use of temporary solutions, such as food banks to community gardens, builds capacity amongst community members by teaching skills in growing their own food and increases their self-reliance. With such efforts, communities are able to determine their own food systems that are socially, economically, and culturally relevant to their food needs. For communities of color after a long history of exploitative laws and policies, food system restructuring returns the ability to own and manage land for food production.

Community development may be necessary for success in CFS to connect people who may ordinarily remain isolated from each other and to commit to long-term solutions. Otherwise, short-term solutions such as food pantries and food distribution reinforce solutions for individual households alone. CFS requires the collaboration of a wide range of people, organizations, and institutions.

=== Advocacy ===
Advocacy is another important strategy in achieving CFS. Promoting locally grown, seasonal, and organic foods in the community can help to support the local economy and protect the environment. Provision of opportunities and enabling conditions for more food to be produced and purchased locally can be done by promoting the benefits of local consumption to the public and by providing incentives and subsidies to farmers. Increasing food production in a community creates a more sustainable food system and lessens reliance on imports from other communities. Advocacy is also important for social equity to ensure that everyone in the community has access to nutritious foods and the ability to participate in decision-making. Conducting research in a community to determine the cost of a nutritious diet and the availability of healthy foods in low-income neighbourhoods can result in data that can be used to advocate for policy change. Advocating for increases in minimum wage to a living wage and more affordable housing is thought to allow community members to have more money available to purchase food. For ethical concerns about where food comes from or if it was harvested in an environmentally sustainable way, one can advocate for stricter regulations on food labels.

=== Policy ===
Policy development and change processes are critical to CFS. McCullum suggests several approaches including: advocating for public policies to support a multi-sectoral approach to CFS; assessing policies that are currently in place to see how they can enable or hinder CFS; collaboration among stakeholders across sectors such as education, labour, economic development, agriculture and health; and involving all stakeholders, including community members, in the decision-making process to alter or create more effective policies that ensure availability of healthy foods to all community members.

Cross-agency collaboration within the community can help to promote a more reliable food supply system, where effective social services are delivered to meet the complex needs of the community. However, approaches to cross-agency collaboration need more case studies and social practices in the future so as to find out a best practice to solve the community food challenge. In addition, the government need to find out innovative and sustainable ways to help local residents have easier access to food.

=== Participatory action research ===
Participatory action research (PAR) is an approach to research that involves participation of the individuals who are most involved, affected, and impacted by the issue being studied. PAR allows issues recognized by those directly affected to be involved in the research designed to address these issues. PAR provides education and empowerment for both participants and researchers, as both are respected contributors to the research process. PAR can help to empower citizens to achieve social change and influence policy; reduce stigma and stereotypes; and ensure successful, sustainable outcomes are achieved. At the community level PAR is an excellent strategy to help achieve CFS as it involves those directly affected in the issue. The evidence-based data collected from PAR can be used in decision making to support the need for policy change, as strong evidence is needed in order to receive support from government. An example of a PAR that addresses CFS is the Activating Change Together for Community Food Security (ACT for CFS) project in Nova Scotia, Canada, which uses PAR to better understand and improve CFS in Nova Scotia (http://foodarc.ca/actforcfs). The final reports from ACT for CFS can be accessed at http://foodarc.ca/project-pages/results-publications/. PAR is conducive to knowledge mobilization, increased awareness, capacity-building, evidenced-based research, direct action, and collaboration of efforts from various stakeholders, individuals and organizations working to improve CFS and CFS-related policy.

== Related terms ==
=== Food sovereignty ===
Food sovereignty is a term popularized by La Via Campesina, an international peasant movement composed of ordinary citizens, small and medium scale farmers, rural women and indigenous communities. In response to the globalization of agriculture this movement works to promote the importance of people and communities taking responsibility of our food systems. The term food sovereignty stresses that individuals have the right to a voice in food and agricultural policies as well as the right to produce their own food in their own territory. Food concerns such as genetically modified organisms (GMOs), environmental degradation, trade negotiations, and food safety have inspired interest in alternative solutions to improve current food systems. Seeds are one of peasants’ most precious resources and as a result La Via Campesina regularly exchanges seeds in the hopes of regaining control of seed supplies. La Via Campesina has inspired other social movements and non-governmental organizations (NGOs) to engage in the promotion of food sovereignty and it is now a recognized term used by large global organizations such as the Food and Agriculture Organization (FAO) and the United Nations Commission on Human Rights.
