= Kairabah, Queensland =

Kairabah
- Suburb
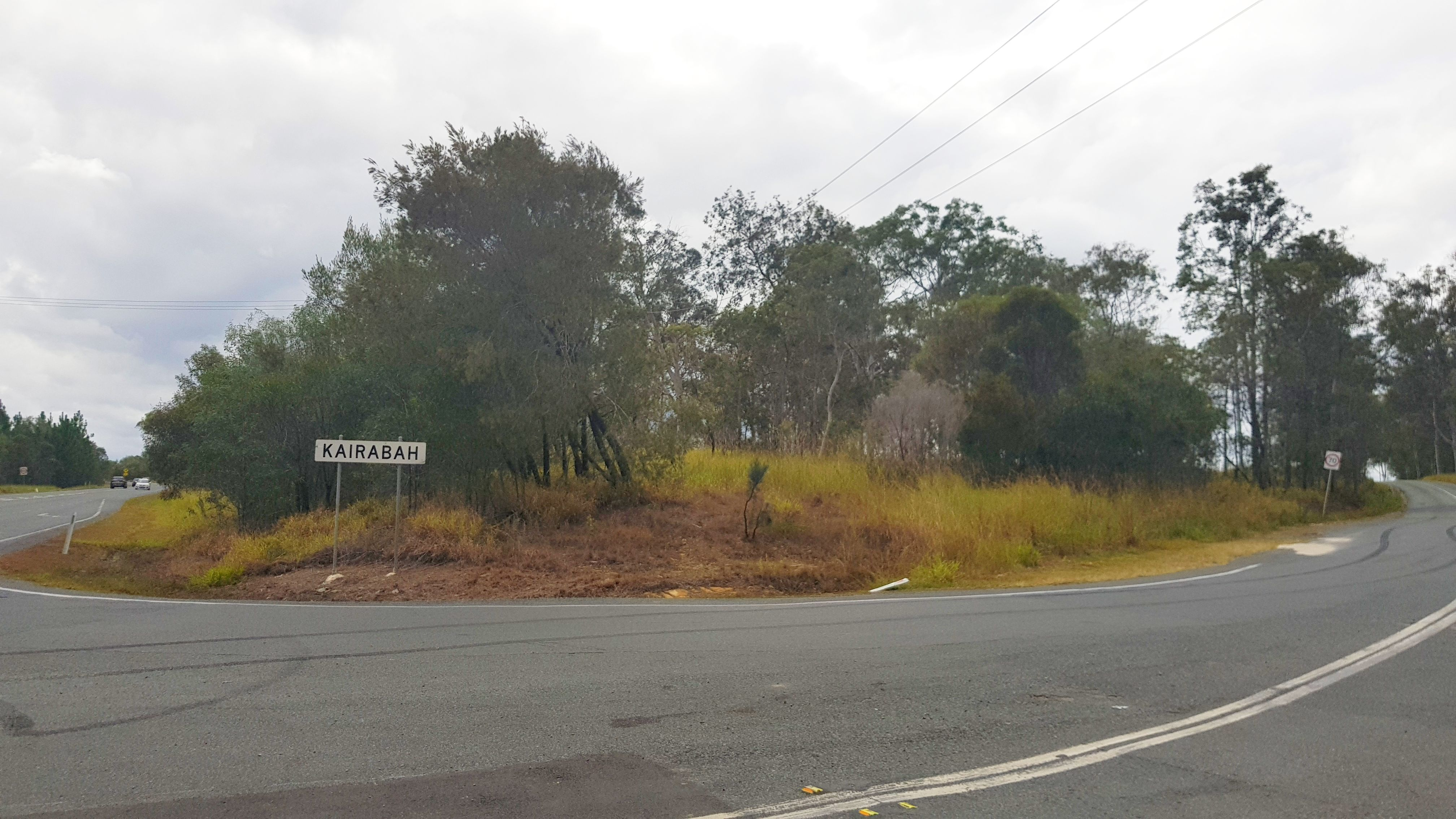
- Plunkett Road, 2023

- Coordinates: 27.8394°S 153.1333°E
- Country: Australia
- State: Queensland
- LGA: City of Logan
- Location: 5.5 km (3.4 mi) SSE of Yarrabilba; 27.8 km (17.3 mi) S of Logan Central; 52.1 km (32.4 mi) S of Brisbane CBD

Government
  - State electorate: Logan
  - Federal division: Wright

Area
  - Total: 7.8 km^{2} (3.0 sq mi)

Population
  - Total: 0 (2021 census)
  - Density: 0.00/km^{2} (0.00/sq mi)
- Time zone: UTC+10:00 (AEST)
- Postcode: 4207
Suburbs around Kairabah
Yarrabilba	Yarrabilba	Cedar Creek
Tamborine	Kairabah	Cedar Creek
Tamborine	Tamborine	Tamborine

Kairabah is a former rural locality in the City of Logan, Queensland, Australia. In the 2021 census, Kairabah had "no people or a very low population". In 2025, it was incorporated into its neighbouring suburb, Yarrabilba.

== History ==
On 28 November 2014, a portion of Yarrabilba was excised to create a new locality, Kairabah. The name Kairabah was proposed by Lendlease from a suggestion by the Yugambeh Museum. It means "Place of White Cockatoo" and is derived from the Yugambeh language.

On 18 July 2025, following a period of public consultation, it was decided to incorporate Kairabah into the locality of Yarrabilba in order to have a single locality name for the whole of Yarrabilba Priority Development Area.

== Demographics ==
In the 2016 census, Kairabah had "no people or a very low population".

In the 2021 census, Kairabah had "no people or a very low population".

== Development ==
As at 2015, Kairabah was unoccupied. Roads and water infrastructure was to be developed, followed by residential development over the following several years.
