= Yarrabilba =

- Suburb
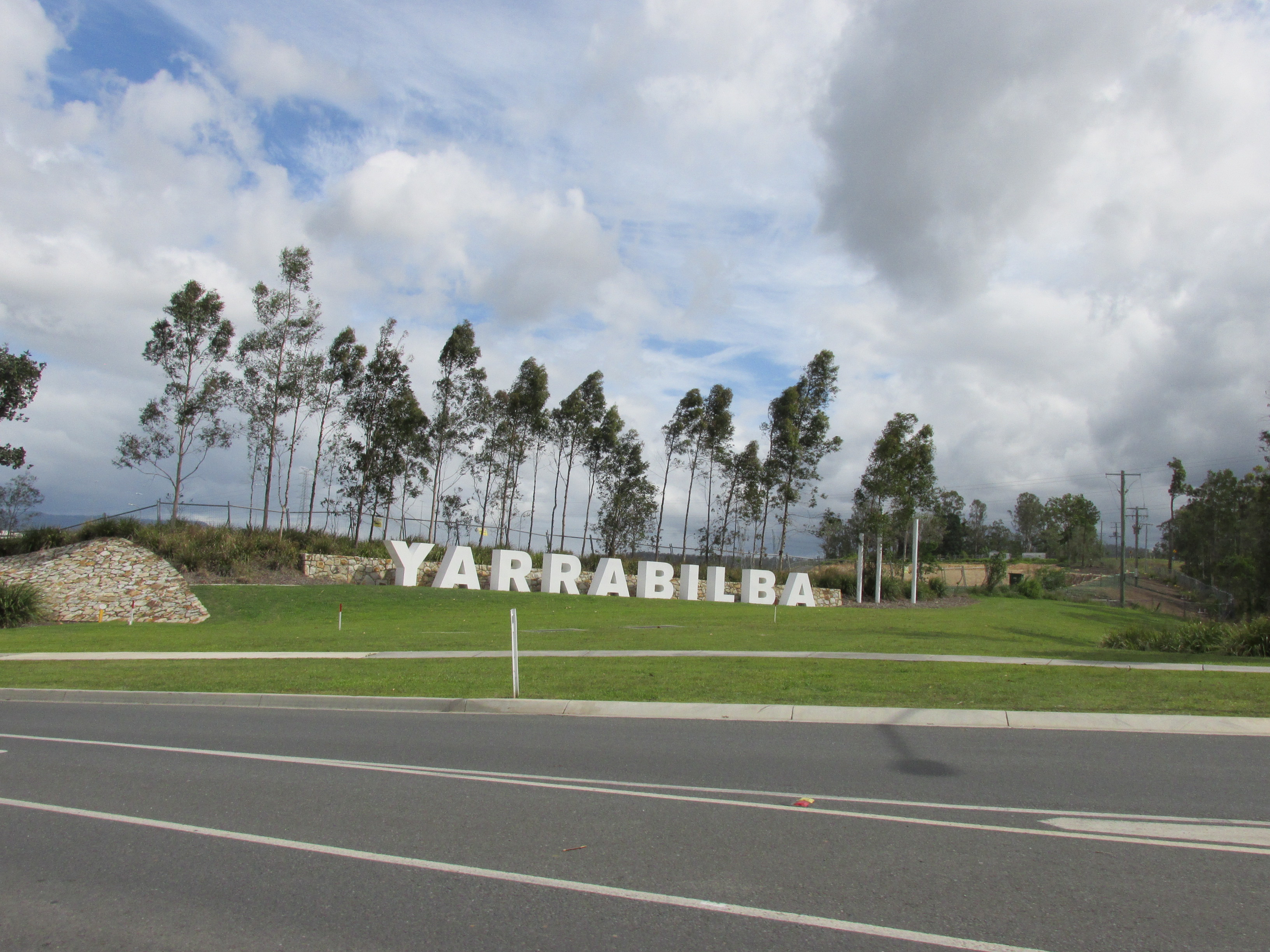

- Interactive map of Yarrabilba
- Coordinates: 27.8141°S 153.1211°E
- Country: Australia
- State: Queensland
- LGA: Logan City
- Location: 22.3 km (13.9 mi) S of Logan Central; 46.6 km (29.0 mi) S of Brisbane CBD
- Established: 1862

Government
  - State electorate: Logan
  - Federal division: Wright

Area
  - Total: 21.2 km^{2} (8.2 sq mi)

Population
  - Total: 10,240 (2021 census)
  - Density: 483.0/km^{2} (1,251/sq mi)
- Time zone: UTC+10:00 (AEST)
- Postcode: 4207
Suburbs around Yarrabilba
Logan Village	Logan Village	Logan Village
Logan Village	Yarrabilba	Cedar Creek
Tamborine	Kairabah	Kairabah

Yarrabilba is a locality in the City of Logan, Queensland, Australia. In the 2021 census, Yarrabilba had a population of 10,240 people.

It is located approximately 20 kilometres south of Logan Central. It is a planned urban community in the outer metropolitan area of Logan City, developed through a combination of residential neighbourhoods, schools, parks, community facilities and commercial precincts.

The locality's modern development is centred on the Yarrabilba Priority Development Area (PDA), a 2,222-hectare area declared by the Queensland Government on 8 October 2010. The development scheme provides for up to 20,000 dwellings and a population of up to 50,000 people when fully developed, with the project expected to take 20 to 30 years.

The area has a history predating the modern suburb, including Aboriginal hertiage, nineteenth-century European settlement, timber production, the Canungra railway line and Camp Cable, a major United States Army facility established during the Second World War. The transition from rural and plantation land to planned urban development has substantially changed the area's landscape and land use.

== Geography ==
Yarrabilba extends across approximately 2,222 hectares between Waterford–Tamborine Road to the west, Plunkett Road to the south and Plunkett Conservation Park to the east.

Scenic Rim mountain range

Yarrabilba occupies a gently undulating landscape framed by ranges and elevated terrain. The Cooingee Range lies to the east, associated with Plunkett Conservation Park, while the Darlington Range extends to the south and south-east and the Birnam Range lies to the west. These ranges form a backdrop to the developed area.

The surrounding area includes established residential communities, rural land, conservation areas and forested hills towards the Scenic Rim. The landscape has been progressively transformed by residential development, although areas of vegetation and land reserved for open space remain important features of the broader locality.

== History ==
=== Indigenous history ===
The area now known as Yarrabilba lies within the traditional Country of Aboriginal peoples of South East Queensland. Logan City Council identifies the Yugambeh language group as having a longstanding connection with the area south of the Logan River. The name Yarrabilba comes from the Wangerriburra/Bundjalung language for place of song. The area contained two bora rings where ceremonies involving singing took place.

The surrounding landscape also holds cultural significance for local Aboriginal people. Logan City Council identifies Borrol as a Yugambeh word meaning “mountain range” or “mountain peak”. Borrol Lookout, formerly known as South Rock, is a sandstone outcrop that provides views of the surrounding ridges and mountains and is associated with documented Aboriginal cultural heritage.

According to Logan City Council, the archaeological work recovered 1,859 stone artefacts, including 62 associated specifically with the South Rock site. The assessment recommended that South Rock be protected and conserved as part of the area's ongoing urban development.

=== European settlement ===
European settlement in the Logan and Albert River districts expanded during the nineteenth century, with land used for agriculture, pastoral activity and timber production. Logan City Council's historical account identifies William Steele as an early landholder associated with the area now known as Yarrabilba. Steele established a property called Albert Park near the Albert River around 1862, and Steele's Road subsequently took its name from him.

The wider district developed through a mixture of farming, timber extraction and settlement. Land ownership and transport routes influenced the area's early development, while the growth of nearby rural communities, such as Logan Village and Jimboomba, connected the district with markets and settlements elsewhere in south-east Queensland.

The names of early landholders and local geographical features remain part of the area's historical record. Later changes in land use, particularly the establishment of railway infrastructure and military facilities, would have a considerable influence on the area during the twentieth century.

==== Canungra railway line ====
A timber train on the Canungra railway line

The Canungra railway line was constructed to connect the timber-producing area around Canungra, including Logan Village and the area known known as Yarrabilba, with the wider Queensland railway network. The line reached Canungra in 1915 and served industries and settlements along its route. A railway station at Plunkett, near the Albert River, served the rural area associated with present-day Yarrabilba.

Timber was an important source of freight traffic on the line. Its importance increased during the Second World War, when military personnel and supplies moved through the district. Logan City Council records that the heaviest traffic on the line was associated with the American Army camp, Camp Cable from 1942.

The railway ceased operating in 1955. Its closure marked the end of a transport connection that had supported the area's timber industry and wartime military activity.

==== Camp Cable ====
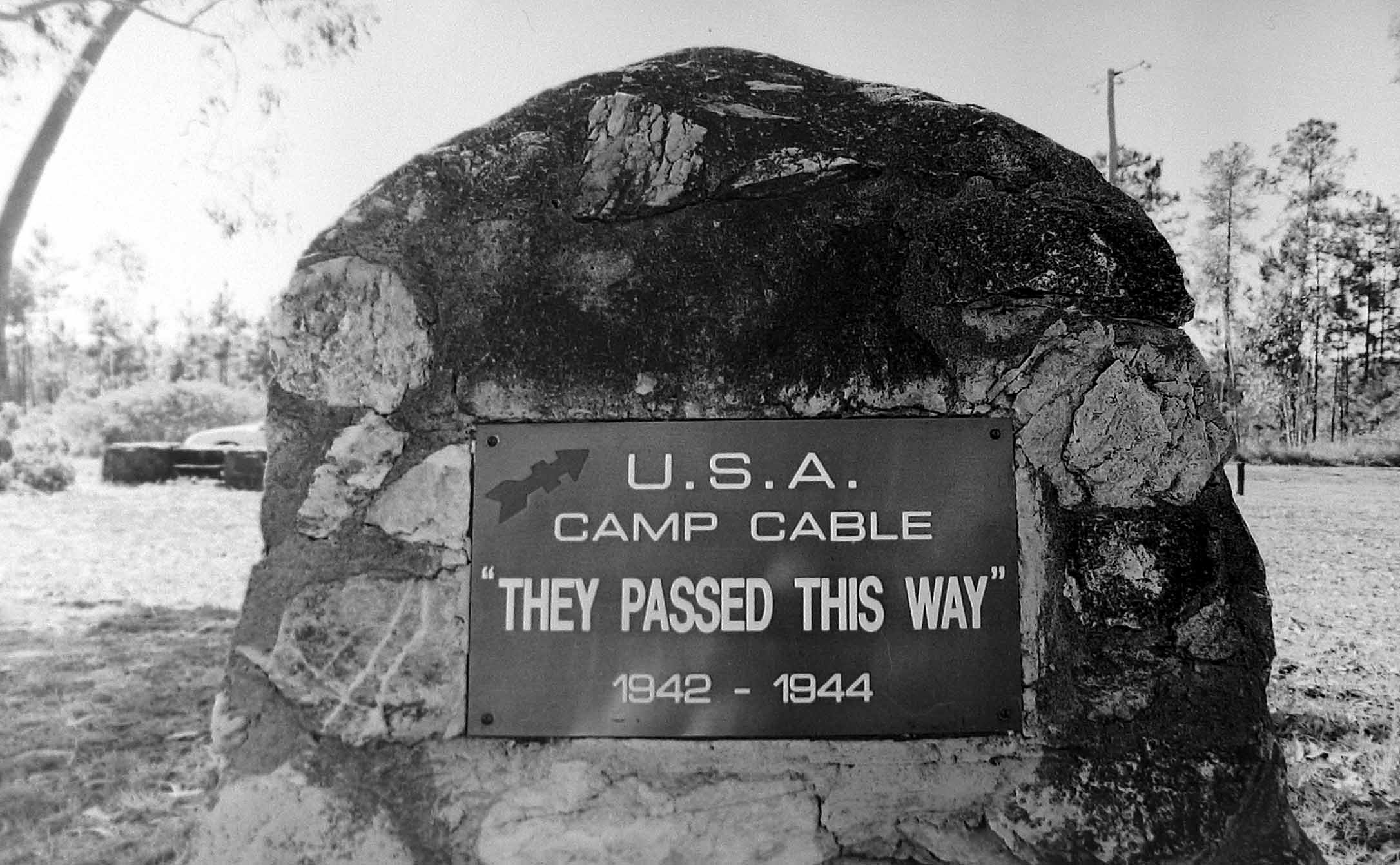
Camp Cable memorial cairn, 2009

During the Second World War, the darea became the location of Camp Cable, a major United States Army training and accommodation facility. The camp was named in honour of Sergeant Gerald O'Cable, a member of the 32nd Infantry Division who was killed when a Japanese submarine attacked a transport vessel off the Australian coast.

Camp Cable supported American and Australian forces preparing for service in the Pacific theatre. Its facilities included accommodation, medical facilities, storage areas and other infrastructure required to support military personnel. The camp accommodated up to 35,000 soldiers at one time. A railway siding was constructed at Logan Village, while storage facilities and upgraded roads, bridges and culverts supported the movement of military personnel and supplies.

An army hospital was built on the southern side of the Albert River, and a theatre was constructed for military use. The military presence brought substantial activity to the area that had previously been predominantly rural farming and timber communities.

Following the war, the military facilities were no longer required and the land returned to civilian use. The former camp area subsequently formed part of the landscape used for forestry and other rural activities before the establishment of the modern urban development.

==== Post-war forestry and rural land use ====
Following the Second World War, timber production and plantation forestry became important features of the wider district. The former military area was gradually returned to civilian use, while parts of the surrounding land continued to be used for rural and forestry purposes.

In the locality later known as Kairabah, a slash-pine plantation was established in 1966. By 1980, the plantation had produced approximately 18,000 cubic metres of timber, which supplied a plywood mill in Ipswich.

The plantation landscape persisted for decades before large-scale residential development began to transform the area. The change from forestry and rural land use to a planned urban community was one of the defining changes in the district's modern history.

=== Establishment of the planned urban community ===
The modern development of Yarrabilba emerged from planning for population growth in South East Queensland. The Queensland Government declared the Yarrabilba Priority Development Area on 8 October 2010, establishing a framework for the coordinated development of a large residential community. The PDA development scheme commenced on 8 October 2011.

In 2011, development began for the new urban precinct. Lend-Lease was granted approval for the development of the first 93.2-hectare (230-acre) stage of the project.

The scheme has since been amended, including changes in July 2022 and February 2025. It provides the planning framework for residential neighbourhoods, commercial areas, community facilities, transport networks and open space across the development area. Economic Development Queensland is responsible for assessing development applications within the PDA.

In 2015, Kairabah was established as a separate locality south of Yarrabilba. Following a Queensland Government locality naming process in 2024 and 2025, Kairabah was incorporated into Yarrabilba, creating a single locality name across the wider development area. The change was intended to reduce confusion associated with having two locality names within the planned community.

St Clare's Catholic Primary School opened in 2017.

Yarrabilba State School opened on 1 January 2018.

Yarrabilba State Secondary College opened on 1 January 2020.

San Damiano College opened in 2021, initially offering Year 7 schooling.

== Demographics ==
The population has continued to change as residential development progresses. At the 2021 Australian census, Yarrabilba had a population of 10,240 people. The median age was 25 years, and the locality contained 3,454 private dwellings. The average household size was 3.1 people, while the median weekly household income was $1,585.

The census recorded 2,631 families in Yarrabilba. Approximately 74.6% of residents were born in Australia, while New Zealand was the most frequently reported overseas country of birth. The most commonly reported ancestries included Australian, English, Scottish and Irish.

The suburb had a comparatively young population at the time of the census. Children aged under 15 accounted for a substantial proportion of residents, consistent with the area's development as a growing residential community. The median age of 25 was lower than the Queensland median of 38 years.

== Urban Dvelopment ==
=== Residential growth ===
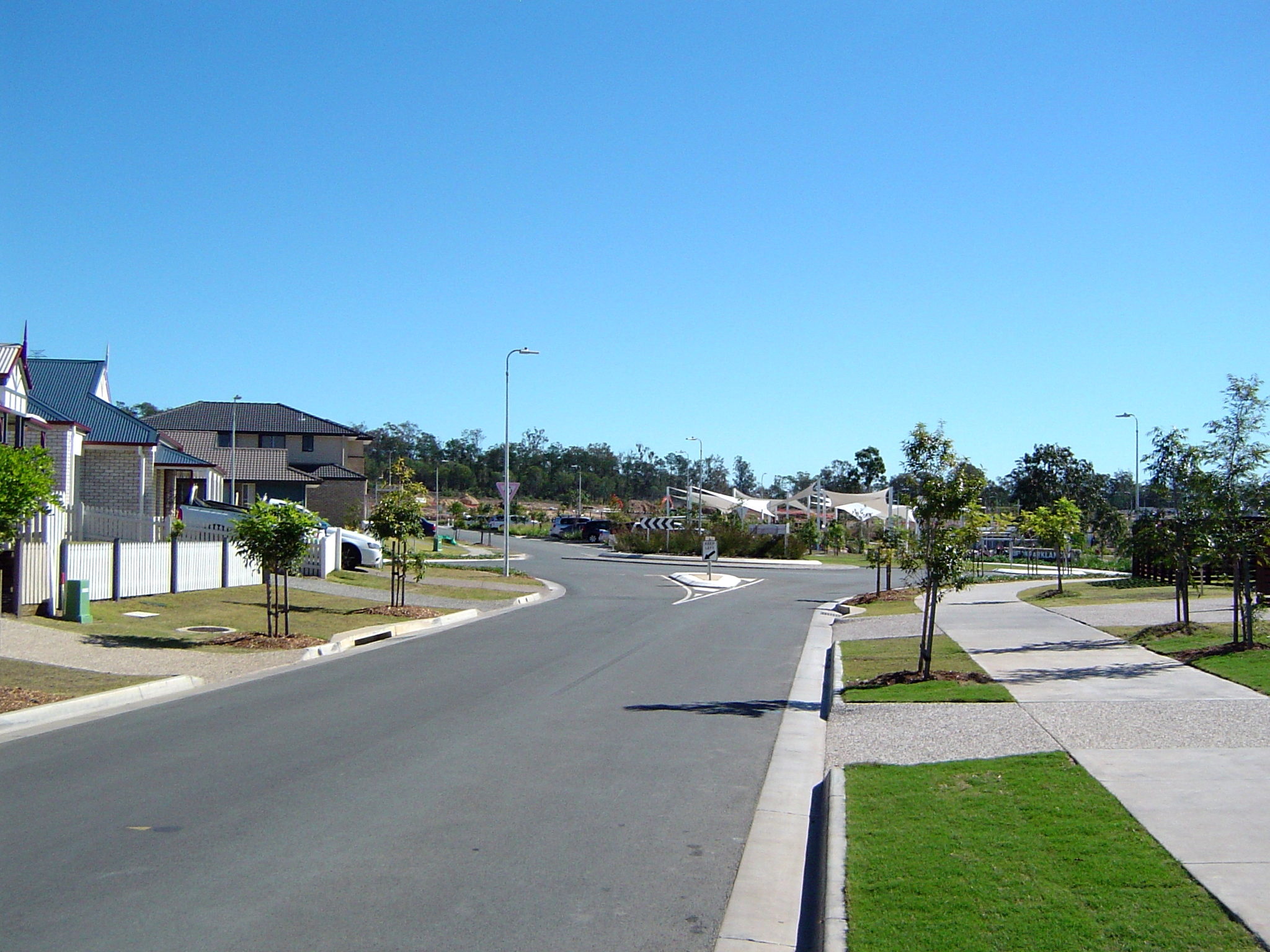
Suburban street in Yarrabilba

Residential development has been the principal driver of Yarrabilba's modern growth. Housing estates have been constructed in successive stages, gradually replacing areas previously used for forestry and rural purposes.

The long-term development scheme provides for up to 20,000 dwellings. The planned housing supply is intended to accommodate a population of up to 50,000 people when the PDA is fully developed.

The development has also begun to incorporate a wider range of housing types. In January 2026, Stockland reported plans for terrace housing, apartments and ground-floor retail as part of the developing town centre. The proposed apartment development was described by the developer as Yarrabilba's first apartment offering.

==== Town centre ====
A future town centre forms part of the long-term development plan for Yarrabilba. It is intended to provide retail, commercial and community services for the growing population and become a major focus of activity within the planned community.

In January 2026, Stockland reported that masterplanning for the town centre had been completed and that preliminary infrastructure works and site preparation were progressing. The developer also reported that subdivision applications had been lodged for the first stage of the centre and the future sub-regional shopping centre site.

== Infrastructure and Services ==
=== Transport ===
Yarrabilba is connected to the surrounding region through the road network, including Waterford–Tamborine Road. Road transport is important for access to employment, education, shopping and other services in Logan City and the wider Brisbane metropolitan area.

Private vehicles remain an important means of transport for residents travelling within Yarrabilba and to destinations elsewhere in south-east Queensland.

Public transport is provided by buses operated under the Translink network. Bus Route 587 connects Yarrabilba with Waterford and Loganlea. Loganlea railway station provides a connection to the wider Queensland Rail network for passengers travelling beyond the local bus network.

Translink On Demand bus

In September 2026, Translink introduced an on-demand transport service for Yarrabilba to complement the regular bus network. The pre-booked, shared service operates within Yarrabilba and connects passengers from designated pickup and drop-off points.

=== Education ===
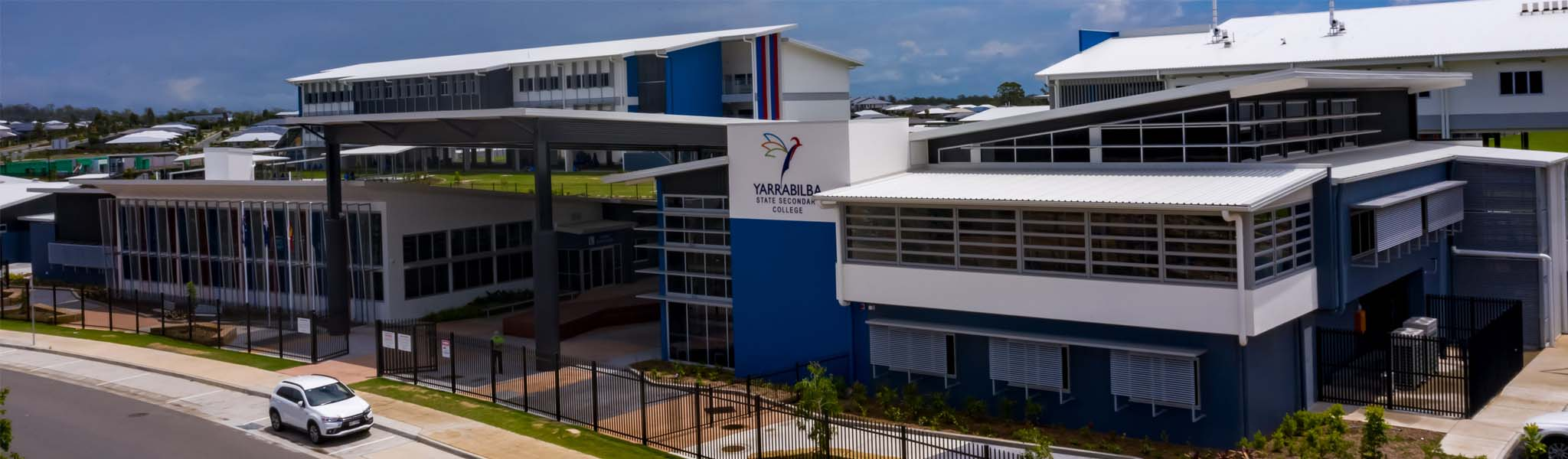
Yarrabilba State Secondary College, 2020

Education facilities have been established as part of the suburb's growth. Schools provide services to children and young people living in Yarrabilba and surrounding areas.

Yarrabilba State School is a government primary school (Prep to Year 6) for boys and girls at 1 Darnell Street (27.8036°S 153.1146°E). It includes a special education program. In 2018, the school had an enrolment of 470 students with 35 teachers (34 full-time equivalent) and 21 non-teaching staff (16 full-time equivalent). In February 2020, it had an enrolment of approximately 850 students.

St Clare's Primary School is a Catholic primary (Prep to Year 6) school for boys and girls at 2 Combs Street (27.8055°S 153.1087°E). In 2018, the school had an enrolment of 166 students with 19 teachers (16 full-time equivalent) and 15 non-teaching staff (10 full-time equivalent).

Yarrabilba State Secondary College is a government secondary (Years 7 to 12) school for boys and girls at 22–60 McKinnon Drive (27.8087°S 153.1213°E). At the end of 2020 (its first year of operation with only Year 7-8 students), it had an enrolment of 277 students.

San Damiano College is a Catholic secondary (Years 7 to 12) school for boys and girls at 980-1040 Yarrabilba Drive (27.8095°S 153.1171°E).

=== Community facilities ===
The Buzz at Yarrabilba community centre opened on 5 December 2022. The facility provides a community venue within the suburb and forms part of the infrastructure developed to serve its growing population.

=== Parks and recreation ===
Yarrabilba contains a network of parks, playgrounds, sporting fields and open spaces developed alongside its residential areas. Darlington Parklands provides playgrounds, a water play area, picnic facilities and outdoor fitness equipment.

Sporting facilities include Shaw Street Ovals, which accommodates several field sports and court activities, and McKinnon Sports Park, which contains touch football fields and facilities for Australian rules football and cricket Neighbourhood parks and walking trails provide additional opportunities for outdoor recreation.
