= Yarrabilba State Secondary College =

School in Logan, Queensland, Australia

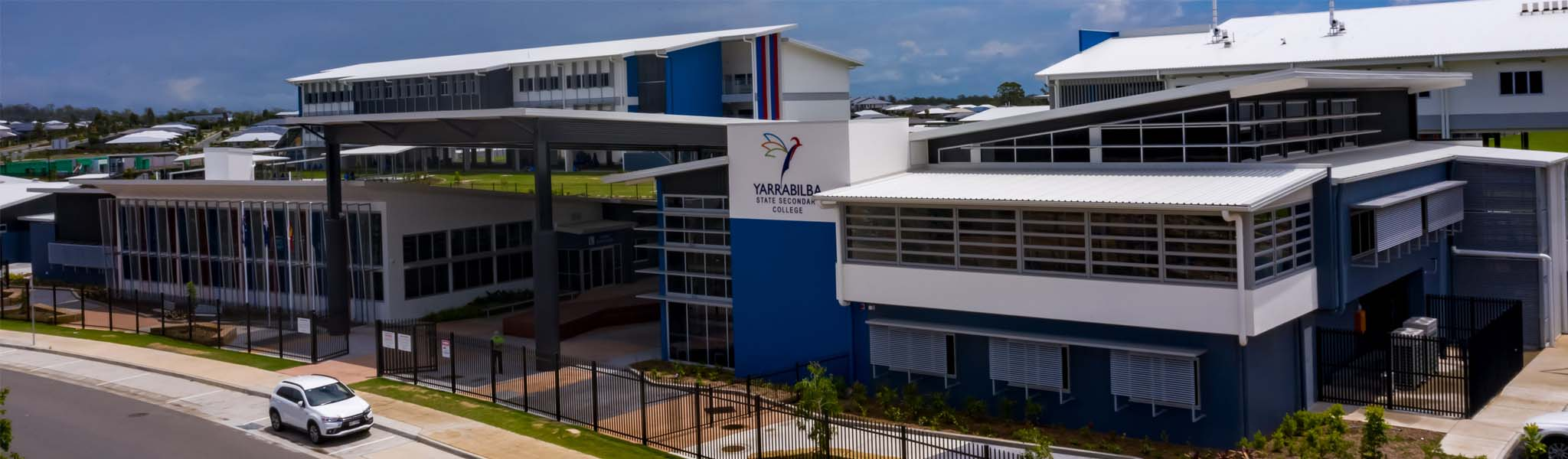
- Yarrabilba State Secondary College, 2020

Location
- 22-60 McKinnon Drive; Yarrabilba, Logan City, Queensland, 4207; Australia; 27.8078393°S 153.1170387°E

Information
- Type: State secondary day school
- Motto: Learning today, leading tomorrow
- Established: 2020
- Principal: Belinda Tregea
- Grades: year 7–year 12
- Gender: Coeducational
- Enrolment: 1,090 (August 2025)
- Houses: Lorikeets, Osprey, Kingfishers, Rosellas
- Colours: Navy; White; Red; Sky blue
- Mascot: Yarrabilba blue tongue lizard
- Website: yarrabilbassc.eq.edu.au

Yarrabilba State Secondary College (YSSC) is a secondary school located in Yarrabilba (Queensland, Australia), a locality of Logan City.

== Etymology ==
The indigenous Australian Wanggeriburra clan of the Yugambeh language group occupied the land of Yarrabilba before the arrival of Europeans. The suburb's name, and hence the school's name, are based on the word "Yarrabilba" meaning 'place of song' in Wangerriburra/Bundjalung language.

== Infrastructure ==
=== Construction ===
On 23 March 2019, the first sod of soil was turned in the $65 million project, led by Broad Construction, to build a state secondary school at Yarrabilba, one of the eight schools built as part of the Palaszczuk government's investment of more than $450 million. Construction was completed in 2019 and the school was opened in 2020.

=== Computers ===
The Logan-based Social enterprise "Substation33", which repurposes technology, donated computers and laptops to the school, some of which were used by coding tutorial groups.

== School leadership ==
Belinda Tregea, the school first and current principal of Yarrabilba State Secondary College, is an English, history and legal studies teacher who was previously the last principal at Dinmore State School, which closed pursuant to a government initiative.

== Students ==
=== Years ===
The school was opened for grades 7 and 8 in January 2020. The school began incrementally offering the first classes of higher year each subsequent years, i.e. year 9 (2021), year 10 (2022), year 11 (2023), and finally year 12 (2024).

=== Student enrolments ===
In 2023, Yarrabilba State Secondary College was reported to have a maximum student enrolment capacity of 1,839 students. The school's Programs of Excellence in Educational Excellence-Ecology and Sustainability, Sports Excellence- Fitness and Nutrition, Performing Arts, Science, Technology, Engineering, Arts and Mathematics (STEAM), Yarrabilba State Secondary College has the following capacity to enrol:

- 75 in the Program of Educational Excellence – Ecology and Sustainability
- 150 in the Program of Sports Excellence – Fitness and Nutrition (High Performance Sport)
- 150 in the Program of Educational Excellence – Performing Arts (Music, Dance, Drama, Public Speaking)
- 75 in the Program of Educational Excellence – STEAM

The school had 260 students on its first day. Since then the trend in school enrolments (August figures) has been:

Student enrolment trends
Year	Years						Boys	Girls	Total	Ref
Year	7	8	9	10	11	12	Boys	Girls	Total	Ref
2020	185	92	-	-	-	-	138	139	277	
2021	206	195	109	-	-	-	265	245	510	
2022	222	200	187	120	-	-	367	362	729	
2023	168	216	175	173	98	-	415	415	830	
2024	187	198	246	176	146	77	532	498	1,030	
2025	TBA	TBA	TBA	TBA	TBA	TBA	557	533	1,090	
2026	TBA	TBA	TBA	TBA	TBA	TBA	TBA	TBA	TBA	

== House structure ==
The school's four sports houses are named after Australian birds:

Current house system
House name	Colour	Australian bird
Lorikeets	Green	Lorikeet
Kingfishers	Blue	Kingfisher
Rosellas	Red	Rosella
Ospreys	Orange	Osprey

== See also ==
- Education in Queensland
- History of state education in Queensland
- List of schools in Greater Brisbane
- List of schools in Queensland
- Lists of schools in Australia
