= Camp Cable =

Australian military base during World War Two

Coordinates: 27.8004°S 153.0997°E

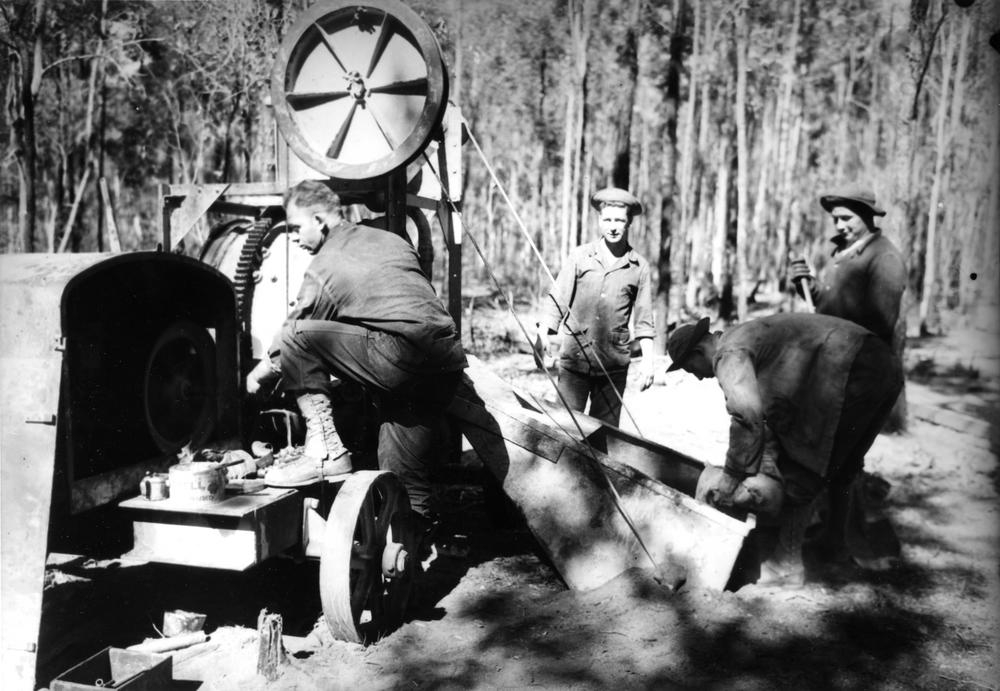
American soldiers using a stationary engine at Camp Cable, Queensland ca. 1942

Camp Cable, 1942–44

Camp Cable, Australia was a World War II army training base near Logan Village, Queensland, Australia.

The base was first known as Camp Tamborine but renamed in honour of Sergeant Gerald O. Cable. Constructed in 1942 for the United States Army Forces in Australia (USAFIA), initially for the 32nd Infantry "Red Arrow" Division (United States) preparing for the New Guinea campaign, the base was occupied by various units during the war. Part of the base was an area south of the Albert River for the 155th Station Hospital.

Camp related entertainment was both local and from overseas. A picture theatre and tennis courts were built near the base Headquarters. American comedian Joe E. Brown performed at the 155th Station Hospital in 1943. A song called Once upon a midnite was written at Camp Cable in 1943 for the show Here we go again, produced at the Theatre Royal, Brisbane, in 1944.

A railway branch line to Canungra, operating from 1915–1955, passed through the base where its traffic peaked during the war. Timber getting and a slash pine plantation were the principal activities on the site of the former base after 1945.

== "Red Arrow" units ==
=== 632 Tank Destroyer Battalion ===
In August 1942 the 632 TD Battalion moved to the then Camp Tamborine after training on antitank ranges at Camp Mangalore, Victoria. Training intensified with emphasis on beach defence and jungle warfare. On 21 December 1942 the battalion moved to Camp Strathpine near Petrie, Queensland.

== Post war ==
=== Yarrabilba development ===
In 2011 development began of the remaining land not previously subdivided for an urban precinct known as Yarrabilba. Prior to 2012, a public park near the original main entrance of the base along Waterford-Tamborine Road included several memorials of remembrance. In 2012 these memorials were moved to the grounds of the Logan Village RSL, situated along Quinzeh Creek Road, to make way for the development's road works.

=== Archaeological field school ===
The School of Social Science at the University of Queensland conducted its first archaeological field school in south-east Queensland at the former Camp Cable site in 2015. The site offers opportunities for field work on World War II history over an extended period, possibly around 10 years, depending on Yarrabilba's development. One aim is to excavate building remains for finds belonging to individuals present during the war era, which can be added to historical collections such as the Queensland Museum.

== See also ==
- Camp Cable – Images
- Queensland – Second World War
