= Community Food Security Coalition =

The Community Food Security Coalition was a North American non-profit made up of 325 member organizations who focus on social and economic justice, the environment, nutrition, sustainable agriculture, community development, labor, anti-poverty, and anti-hunger initiatives. The coalition was dedicated to building strong, sustainable, local and regional food systems to ensure access to affordable, nutritious, and culturally appropriate food to all people at all times. The organization encouraged a system for food sovereignty grounded in the principles of justice, democracy, and sustainability. The coalition sought to further these goals through a comprehensive approach of policy advocacy, education and networking, and technical training.

CFSC worked with The California Food and Justice Coalition, supported a national Farm to School and Farm to College network, and advocated for sustainable and equitable national food policies in Washington, DC. Members of the coalition were involved in a number of committees that focus on various aspects of community food security work such as food retail, food and faith, international links, and urban agriculture. The coalition supported community food projects by advocating for and providing assistance to groups receiving or applying to the Community Food Projects Competitive Grants Program.

On August 6, 2012, the board announced that the organization would transfer projects to other organizations and close.

== See also ==
- Community food security
