= Boyland, Queensland =

Boyland
- Suburb
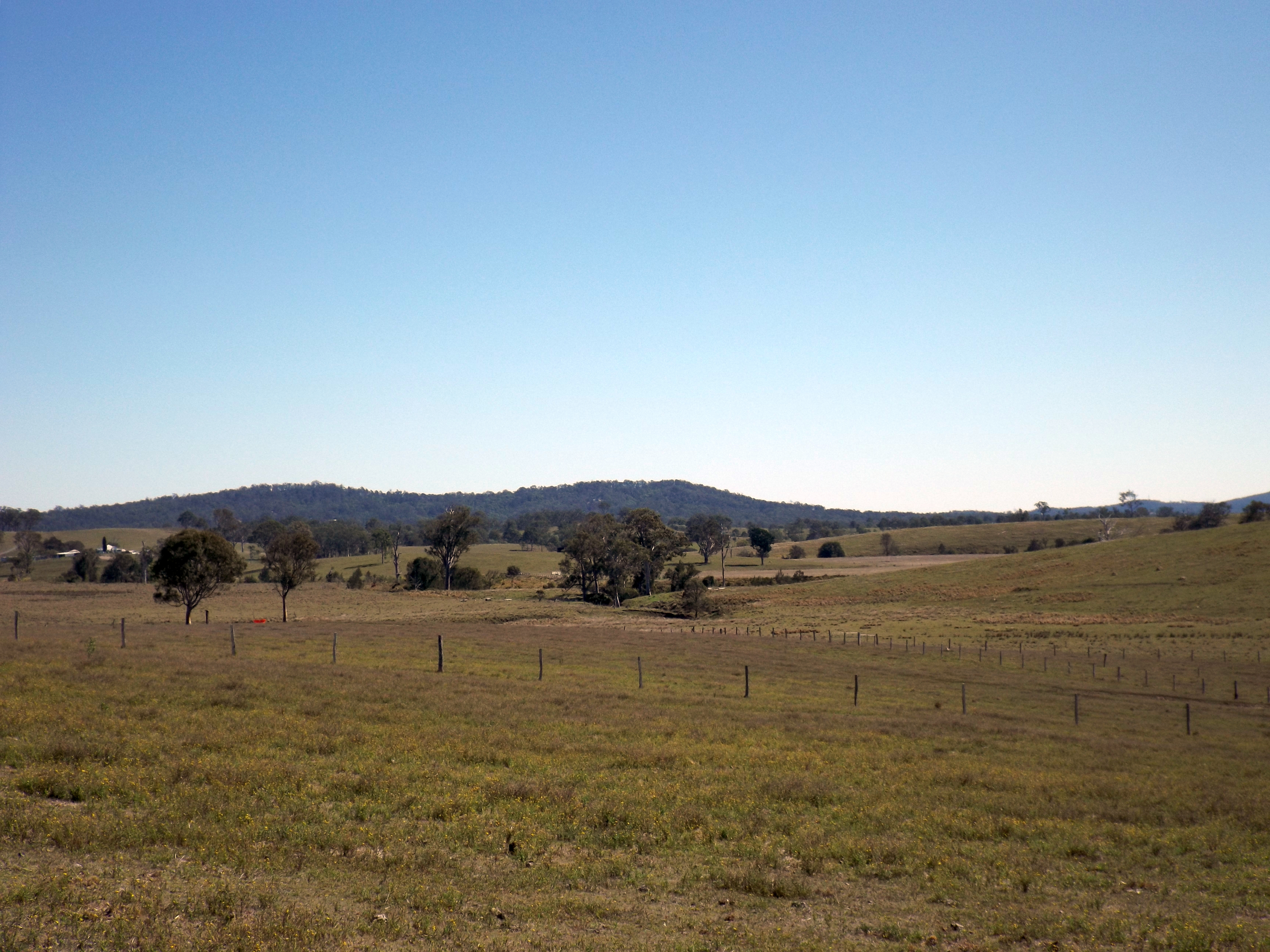
- View northwards from Boyland Road, 2014

- Interactive map of Boyland
- Coordinates: 27.9391°S 153.13°E
- Country: Australia
- State: Queensland
- LGA: Scenic Rim Region
- Location: 8.6 km (5.3 mi) N of Canungra; 20.1 km (12.5 mi) ENE of Beaudesert; 21.1 km (13.1 mi) S of Yarrabilba; 21.7 km (13.5 mi) W of Tamborine Mountain; 66.0 km (41.0 mi) S of Brisbane CBD

Government
  - State electorate: Scenic Rim
  - Federal division: Wright

Area
  - Total: 41.7 km^{2} (16.1 sq mi)

Population
  - Total: 855 (2021 census)
  - Density: 20.50/km^{2} (53.10/sq mi)
- Time zone: UTC+10:00 (AEST)
- Postcode: 4275
Suburbs around Boyland
Mundoolun	Tamborine	Tamborine Mountain
Birnam	Boyland	Tamborine Mountain
Tabragalba	Biddaddaba	Wonglepong

Boyland is a rural locality in the Scenic Rim Region, Queensland, Australia. In the 2021 census, Boyland had a population of 855 people.

== Geography ==
Boyland's western extent is defined by the Albert River. In the east the slopes of Tamborine Mountain rise sharply to elevations greater than 500 metres (1,600 ft).

== History ==
The area is named after the Boyland railway station which is in turn named after George Boyland, the chairman of Tamborine Shire Council from 1907 to 1908 and supporter of the Canungra branch railway.

Boyland Post Office opened on 1 July 1927 (a receiving office had been open from 1915) and closed in 1945.

Boyland railway station (27.9439°S 153.132°E) was on the Canungra branch railway, which operated from 1915 to 30 June 1955.

In 1948 a hall in the Canungra Church grounds was relocated to Bibbaddaba Street in Boyland (approx 27.9429°S 153.1329°E) to hold Anglican services. The land was donated by Ronald Graham. St Hilda's Anglican Church was dedicated on 3 May 1953 by Coadjutor Bishop Horace Henry Dixon. The lack of funds for necessary repairs resulted in the closure of the church with its last service being held on 5 March 1965. The building was relocated to Wonglepong where George Smith used it as a shed. The interior fittings and furnishings were donated to other churches with the chairs going to St George's Anglican Church on Tamborine Mountain, while the altar, cross and organ went to the proposed chapel at the Australian Army's Jungle Training Centre at Canugra.

== Demographics ==
In the 2011 census, Boyland recorded a population of 715 people, 52.4% female and 47.6% male. The median age of the Boyland population was 38 years, compared to the national median age of 37. 78.9% of people living in Boyland were born in Australia. The other top responses for country of birth were New Zealand 6.4%, England 5.6%, Guam 1%, Germany 0.8%, Netherlands 0.6%. 95.1% of people spoke only English at home; the next most common languages were 1.3% Italian, 0.6% German, 0.6% Czech.

In the 2016 census Boyland had a population of 823 people.

In the 2021 census, Boyland had a population of 855 people.

== Education ==
There are no schools in Boyland. The nearest government primary schools are Canungra State School in Canungra to the south and Beaudesert State School in Beaudesert to the south-west. The nearest government secondary schools are Beaudesert State High School in Beaudesert, Yarrabilba State Secondary College in Yarrabilba to the north, and Tamborine Mountain State High School in neighbouring Tamborine Mountain to the east.

== Attractions ==
Rotary Lookout is on the eastern edge of the locality opposite 154-172 Main Western Road (27.94°S 153.1797°E), accessed via Tamborine Mountain.
