= Benobble, Queensland =

Benobble
- Suburb
- Interactive map of Benobble
- Coordinates: 27.9908°S 153.1611°E
- Country: Australia
- State: Queensland
- LGA: Scenic Rim Region
- Location: 3.8 km (2.4 mi) N of Canungra; 17.0 km (10.6 mi) SSW of Tamborine Mountain; 22.1 km (13.7 mi) E of Beaudesert; 73.4 km (45.6 mi) S of Brisbane

Government
  - State electorate: Scenic Rim
  - Federal division: Wright

Area
  - Total: 10.6 km^{2} (4.1 sq mi)

Population
  - Total: 29 (2021 census)
  - Density: 2.74/km^{2} (7.09/sq mi)
- Time zone: UTC+10:00 (AEST)
- Postcode: 4275
Suburbs around Benobble
Biddaddaba	Wonglepong	Tamborine Mountain
Biddaddaba	Benobble	Tamborine Mountain
Biddaddaba	Canungra	Witheren

Benobble is a rural locality in the Scenic Rim Region, Queensland, Australia. In the 2021 census, Benobble had a population of 29 people.

== Geography ==
There are two landmarks in the locality, both referring to sharp bends in the Tamborine Mountain Road on the south-eastern boundary of the locality:

- Devils Elbow (28.0072°S 153.1775°E)
- Upper Hairpin Bend (28.0052°S 153.1761°E)

== History ==
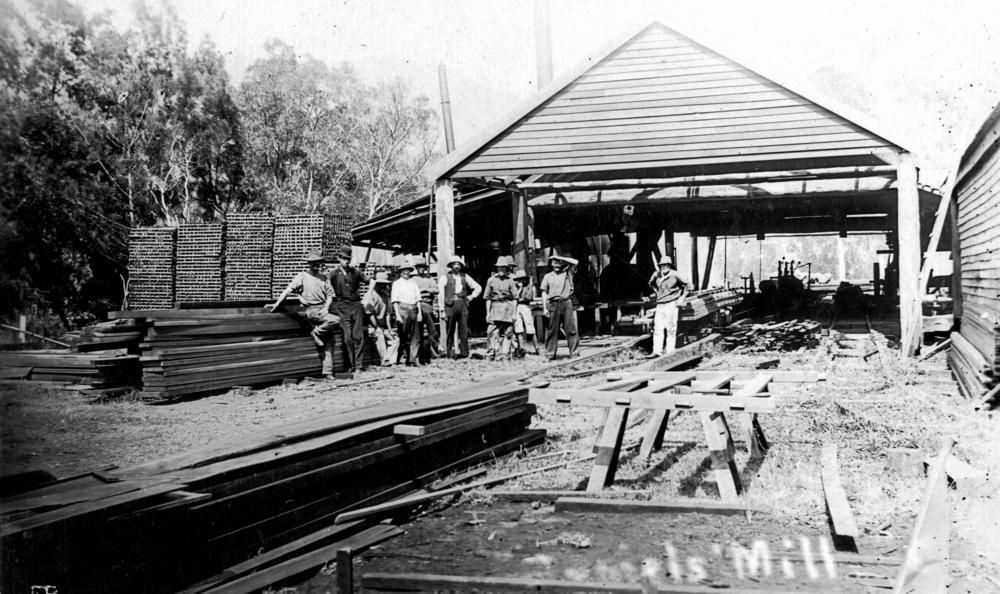
Daniels' sawmill at Benobble, circa 1918

The name Benobble is derived from the Bundjalung language (Yugumbir dialect, Wongerriburra clan) words bunahba gurara meaning "place of the tall bloodwood trees", where bunar means "bloodwood tree" and gurara means "long" or "tall." The name Benobble was initially used as a sawmill name and then as a railway station name from 28 January 1915.

Benobble railway station (27.9950°S 153.1617°E) was on the Canungra railway line, which operated from 1915 to 30 June 1955.

== Demographics ==
In the 2016 census Benobble had a population of 43 people. The locality contains 17 households, in which 51.4% of the population are males and 48.6% of the population are females with a median age of 34, 4 below above the national average. The average weekly household income is $1,416, $22 below the national average.

In the 2021 census, Benobble had a population of 29 people.

== Education ==
There are no schools in Benobble. The nearest government primary school is Canungra State School in neighbouring Canungra to the south. The nearest government secondary school is Tamborine Mountain State High School in neighbouring Tamborine Mountain to the north-east.
