= Laheys Tramway =

Private Railway in Queensland Australia

Coordinates: 28.02309693°S 153.17183202°E

Laheys tramway

History
- Opened: 1900
- Closed: 1933

Technical
- Line length: 16.5 miles (26.6 kilometres)
- Track gauge: 3 ft 6 in (1,067 mm)

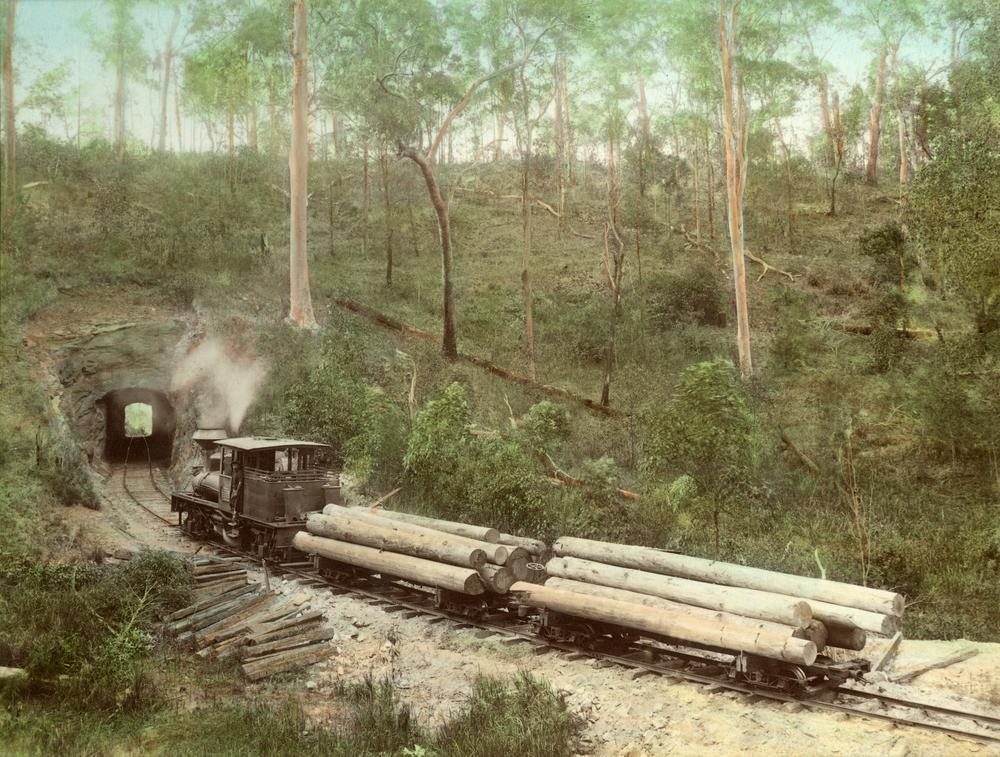
View of the locomotive approaching the tunnel on the Canungra Sawmill tramway.

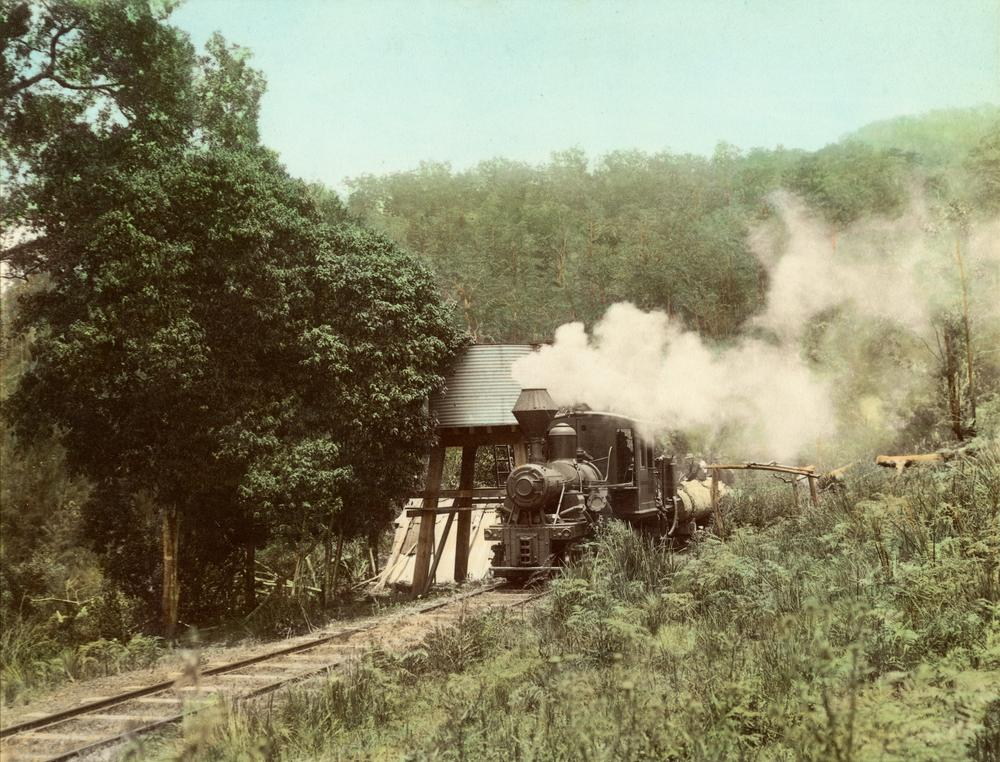
Water tanks for the steam locomotive, Canungra.

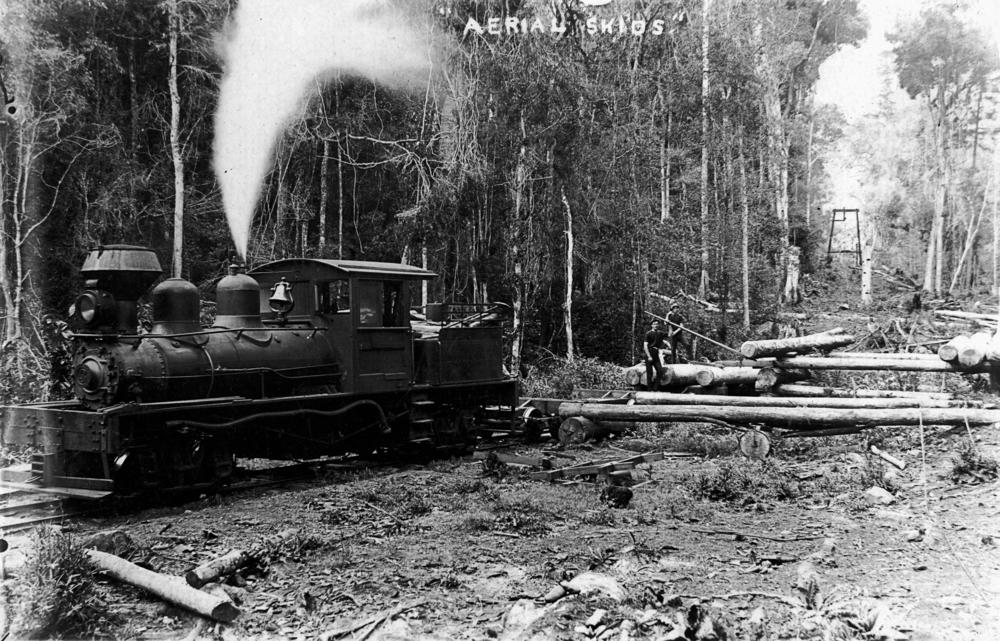
Canungra Pine Creek Tramway in dense timber region ~ 1914.

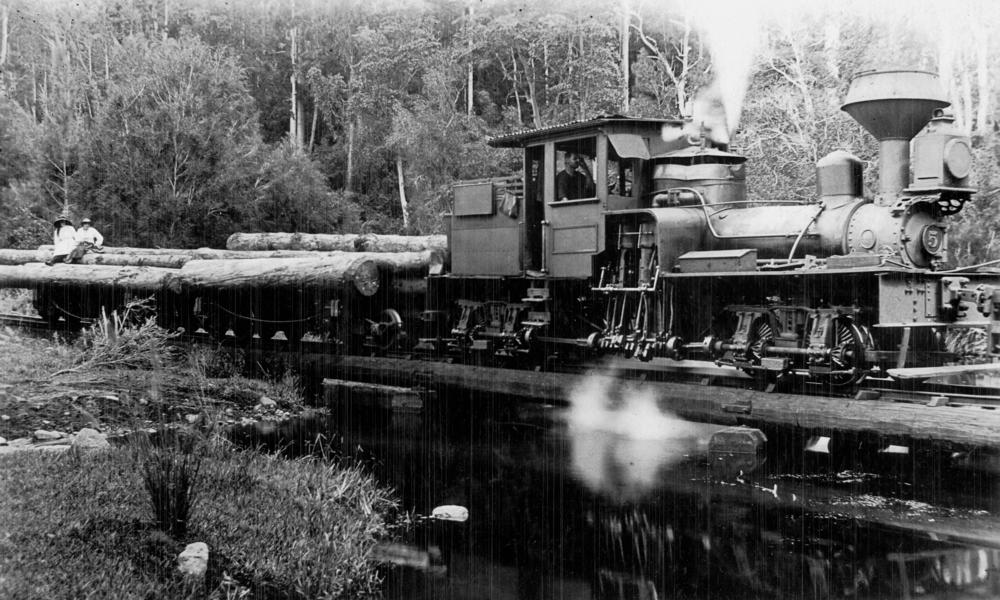
Shay Locomotive 5, part of the Canungra Pine Creek Tramway, ca. 1914. Two cylinder Shay locomotive on low level bridge, part of the Canungra Pine Creek Tramway.

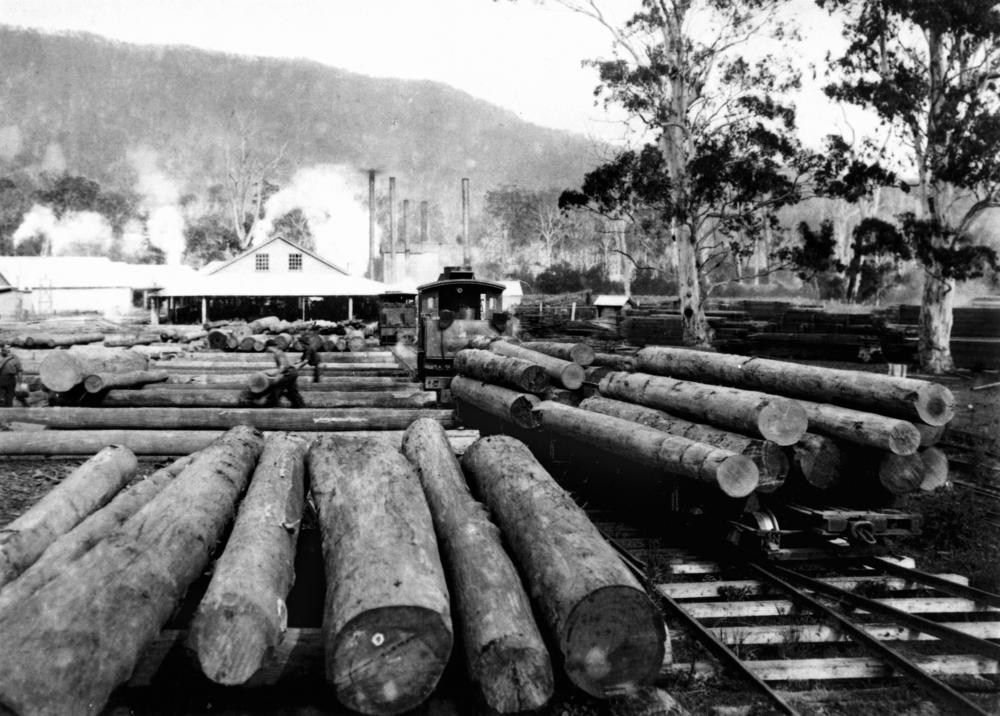
Laheys sawmill ~1913

Laheys Tramway or Canungra Pine Creek Tramway was a private timber railway in South East Queensland, Australia. It connected at Canungra on the Canungra line and consisted of a 16 1/2 miles (26 1/2 km) 'main line' to Upper Coomera and two branches. Its tunnel was added to the Queensland Heritage Register on 11 April 2005.

== Background ==
Canungra was the centre of regional timber production from the 1860s and the Lahey family built a large sawmill there, completed in 1885. Situated in the middle of a hoop pine forest, logs were initially hauled short distances to the mill by bullock teams, but as the haulage distance increased a more efficient method was required.

== History ==
Rail engineer George Phillips surveyed and designed the route of the tramway. The gauge of 3 ft 6 in (1,067 mm) was chosen to match that of the Queensland Government railways. The tramway opened in 1900, and initially used bullocks. Laid with 35 lb/yd (17 kg/m) rail, the track climbed a ridge at an average grade of 1 in 12½ (8%) to a 300 ft (90 m) tunnel, before descending at an average grade of 1 in 16½ (6%) into the adjacent Coomera River valley, using curves as tight as 120 ft (37 m) radius. One and a quarter miles (2 km) had been built by 1901, and in 1903 the line was 5 miles (8 km) long.

=== Rolling stock ===
The first steam locomotive, a Climax locomotive arrived in 1903, and lowered the cost of haulage by 85%.

Another locomotive, a Shay locomotive was purchased from the North Mt Lyell Mining Co. in Tasmania in probably 1906, while a second Shay was purchased new in 1910. The Climax loco was taken out of service in 1912, but was reconditioned by Walkers of Maryborough in 1914, being permanently withdrawn in 1922. Laheys ordered a third Shay loco in 1911, but it was on-sold to the Hampton Cloncurry Mines Ltd. Co. in 1912 without being used on the tramway.

The line also used a Ford Model T converted to a railmotor and a Commer truck converted to a shunter for use at the mill.

=== Operations ===
The line used two types of log bogies, the 'light' model with a capacity of 10 tons and 'heavy' with a capacity of 15 tons. A bogie was placed under each end of a log to create a 'wagon' for transport to the mill. When roller bearing bogies were introduced in 1914, the average load able to be hauled was 6 wagons, a load of up to 90 tons. Whilst there was no formal passenger service, people were able to ride on the log wagons 'at their own risk', and picnic excursions were organised occasionally, planks being used to create temporary 'seating' on the log bogies.

=== Line extension ===
By 1907 the line was 6 1/2 miles (10 1/2 km) long, and the mill had an annual output of 2,500,000 board feet (5,900 m^{3}) of timber, and in 1909 9,200 tons of logs were hauled on the line, increasing to 15,000 tons in 1915, by which time the line has reached its maximum length of 16 1/2 miles (26 1/2 km), plus the 2 1/2 miles (4 km) Flying Fox Creek branch and the 1 1/4 miles (2 km) Prices Creek branch, built at a cost of £26,000. Bridges on the line were up to 40 ft (12 m) high and 150 ft (46 m) long, and there were sidings at Witheren, 3 miles (5 km) from Canungra, Ferny Glen Junction 6 miles (9 1/2 km), Prices Creek Junction 7 miles (11 1/2 km) and Little Flying Fox Junction on the Flying Fox Creek branch, where an aerial cableway lowered logs 1,000 ft (300 m) from an adjacent spur.

=== Connections ===
The mill employed 112 people in 1913, and bullock teams were still used to haul logs from areas not served by the tramway, as well as sawn timber from the mill to the nearest railway station, and in 1911 there were 18 bullock teams moving sawn timber between Canungra and the railway at Logan Village.

A railway from Logan Village to Canungra was first proposed in 1900 with a survey commissioned in 1908. Construction began in 1913 and the line opened on 2 July 1915.

=== Decline and closure ===
In 1920 Laheys sold the mill and tramway to the War Service Homes Commission, but it sold the enterprise a few months later to a company associated with one of sons of the Lahey family. By 1930 most of the millable timber had been harvested, and it is estimated the mill had produced a total of 130M superfeet (~307,000 cubic metres) of timber when it closed in 1933. The tramway was dismantled that year, and the Shay locos were offered for sale, without success, as they were recorded as abandoned at Canungra in 1937.

The tunnel remains, and is a local tourist attraction. People were initially able to walk through it and perhaps see the bats that now use it as a roost, but recent safety concerns have led to the tunnel's closure, although it is still possible to walk to its entrances.

== See also ==
- Rail transport in Queensland
- List of tramways in Queensland
