= Wonglepong, Queensland =

Wonglepong
- Suburb
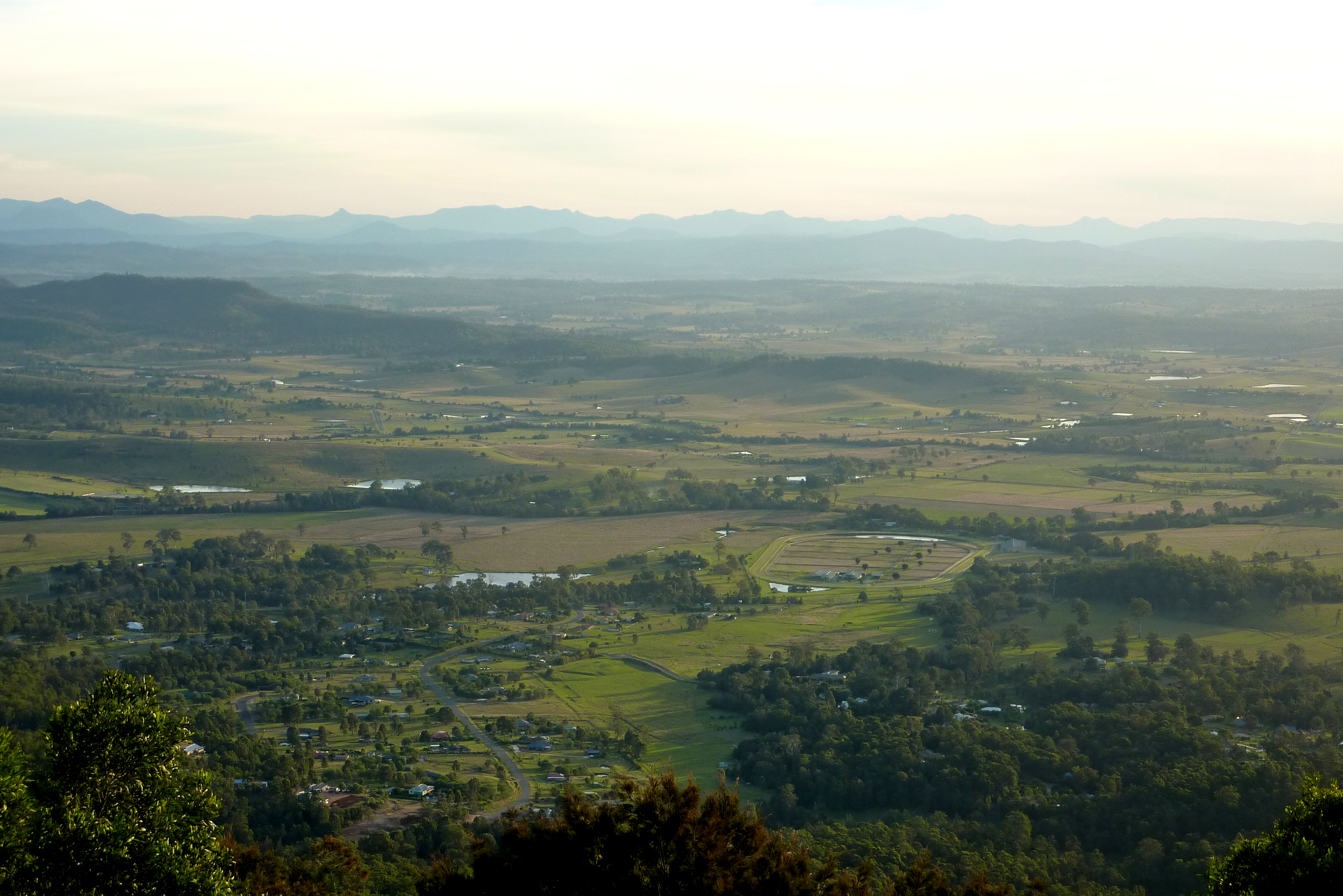
- Wonglepong and surrounds

- Interactive map of Wonglepong
- Coordinates: 27.9702°S 153.1575°E
- Country: Australia
- State: Queensland
- LGA: Scenic Rim Region
- Location: 20.3 km (12.6 mi) E of Beaudesert; 24.4 km (15.2 mi) SW of Tamborine Mountain; 71.2 km (44.2 mi) S of Brisbane CBD

Government
  - State electorate: Scenic Rim
  - Federal division: Wright

Area
  - Total: 8.3 km^{2} (3.2 sq mi)

Population
  - Total: 364 (2021 census)
  - Density: 43.9/km^{2} (113.6/sq mi)
- Time zone: UTC+10:00 (AEST)
- Postcode: 4275
Suburbs around Wonglepong
Boyland	Boyland	Tamborine Mountain
Biddaddaba	Wonglepong	Tamborine Mountain
Biddaddaba	Benobble	Benobble

Wonglepong is a rural locality in the Scenic Rim Region, Queensland, Australia. In the 2021 census, Wonglepong had a population of 364 people.

== Geography ==
Wonglepong straddles a valley upstream from where Canungra Creek joins the Albert River. Development is centered along Beaudesert Nerang Road which passes through the lowest elevations. In the east the slopes of the valley rise sharply towards the Tamborine Mountain plateau.

== History ==
The name Wonglepong was the name of the local railway station name from 1927 (previously known as Sarah Vale). Wonglepong is believed to be an Aboriginal name possibly meaning either forgotten sound or referring to some feature of Mount Tamborine. The name has variant spellings such as Wangalpong.

The Franklin family established a farm in the district called Sarahvale in 1875. The family established a private cemetery on their land. In 1914, Ann Ford Franklin donated 1 acre (0.40 ha) of land including their cemetery to the Tamborine Shire Council (later the Beaudesert Shire Council, now the Scenic Rim Regional Council) for use as a public cemetery. It has been variously known as Sarahvale Cemetery, Lower Canungra Cemetery, Wanglepong Cemetery, and Wonglepong Cemetery.

Caningera Provisional School opened in 1884 and closed in 1893. It re-opened and then closed twice in 1885 and 1887 as Canungra Creek Provisional School. On 20 September 1898 it re-opened as Canungera Lower Provisional School. On 1 January 1909, it became Canungera Lower State School. In 1915, it was renamed Wangalpong State School. In 1928, it was renamed Wonglepong State School. It closed on 13 September 1935. The school was within the present-day Henry Franklin Family Park on Mundoolun Connection Road. A commemorative plaque in the park marks the school's exact site (27.96994°S 153.16294°E), using the name Caningera School.

Wonglepong Methodist Church opened in 1906. It was built by the Caswell family. By 1953, Canungra had overtaken Wonglepong as the centre of the district, but there was no Methodist church in Canungra (despite being planned for some years), so it was decided to donate the church in Wonglepong to assist the establishment of the church in Canungra. In late 1953, the Wonglepong church was demolished so its timbers and fittings could be re-cycled in the construction of the Canungra Methodist Church, which opened in June 1954.

Wonglepong railway station (27.9716°S 153.1628°E) was on the Canungra railway line, which operated from 1915 to 30 June 1955.

The Wonglepong branch of the Queensland Country Women's Association was formed in 1925, founded by Ann Franklin. The branch met in her home for the first eight years, after which her poor health necessitated other members taking turns to host the meetings while funds were raised for a permanent hall. The Franklin family provided the land on a 99-year lease and provided the timber to build the hall. Ann Franklin's son, a carpenter, was in charge of the construction assisted by volunteer labour from the members' husbands. On 4 December 1935, the hall was officially opened by Mrs Buchanan, the President of Central Division of the QCWA. The hall included a library. On 7 November 2015, the branch celebrated its 90th anniversary with the hall's 80th birthday being in December 2015.

== Demographics ==
In the 2011 census, Wonglepong recorded a population of 367 people.

In the 2016 census, Wonglepong had a population of 341 people.

In the 2021 census, Wonglepong had a population of 364 people.

== Heritage listings ==
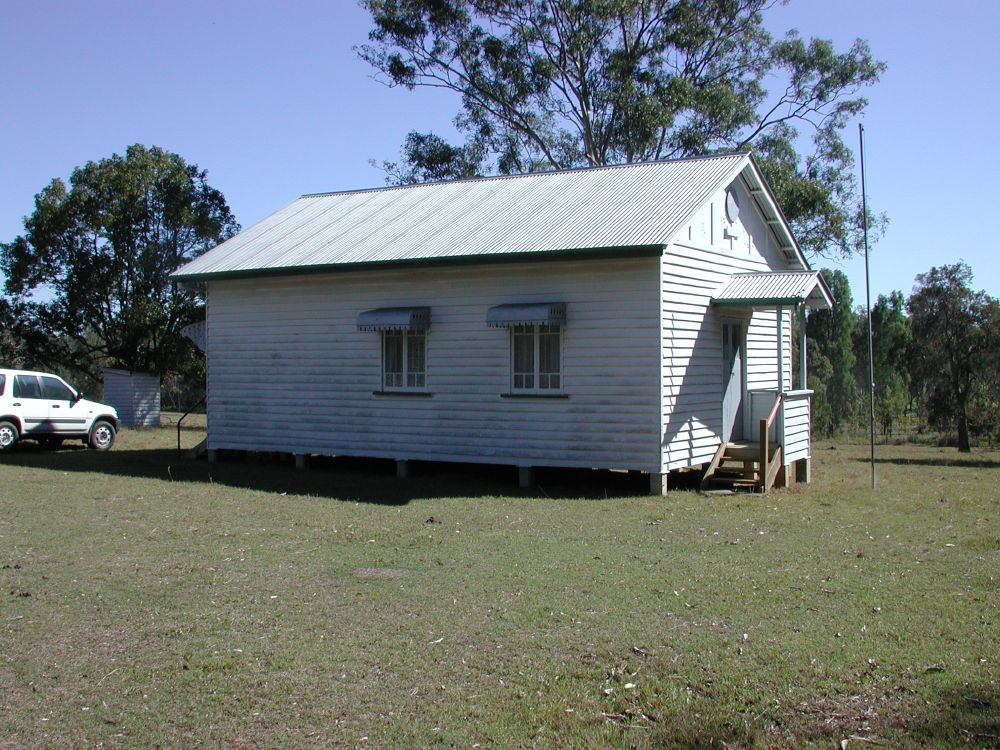
Wonglepong QCWA Hall, 2006

Wonglepong has a number of heritage-listed sites, including:

- Wonglepong QCWA Hall, 2779 Beaudesert-Nerang Road (27.97317°S 153.16317°E)

== Education ==
There are no schools in Wonglepong. The nearest government primary school is Canungra State School in Canungra to the south. The nearest government secondary schools are Beaudesert State High School in Beaudesert to the west and Tamborine Mountain State High School in neighbouring Tamborine Mountain to the east.

== Amenities ==
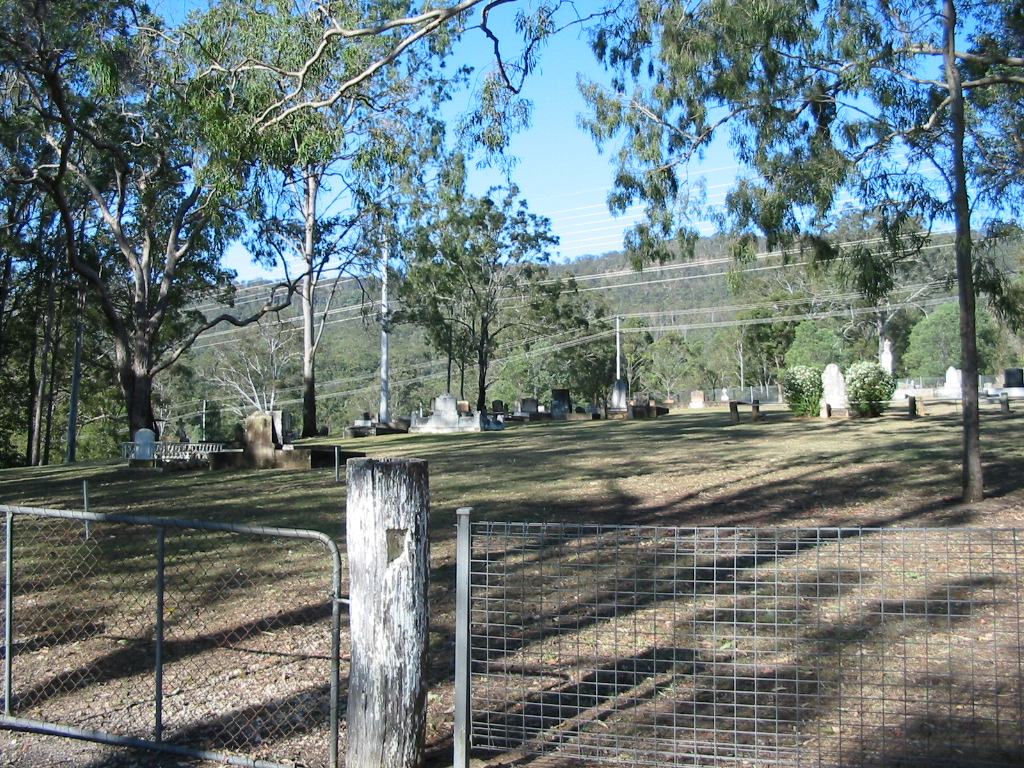
Wonglepong Cemetery, 2005

The Wonglepong branch of the Queensland Country Women's Association meets at the Wonglepong QCWA Hall at 2779 Beaudesert Nerang Road.

There are a number of parks in the locality, including:

- Henry Franklin Family Park (27.9697°S 153.1635°E)
- Hugh Mahoney Reserve Park (27.9639°S 153.1597°E)

Wonglepong Cemetery is off Franklin Lane (27.9771°S 153.1641°E). It is operated by the Scenic Rim Regional Council.
