= Biddaddaba, Queensland =

Biddaddaba
- Suburb
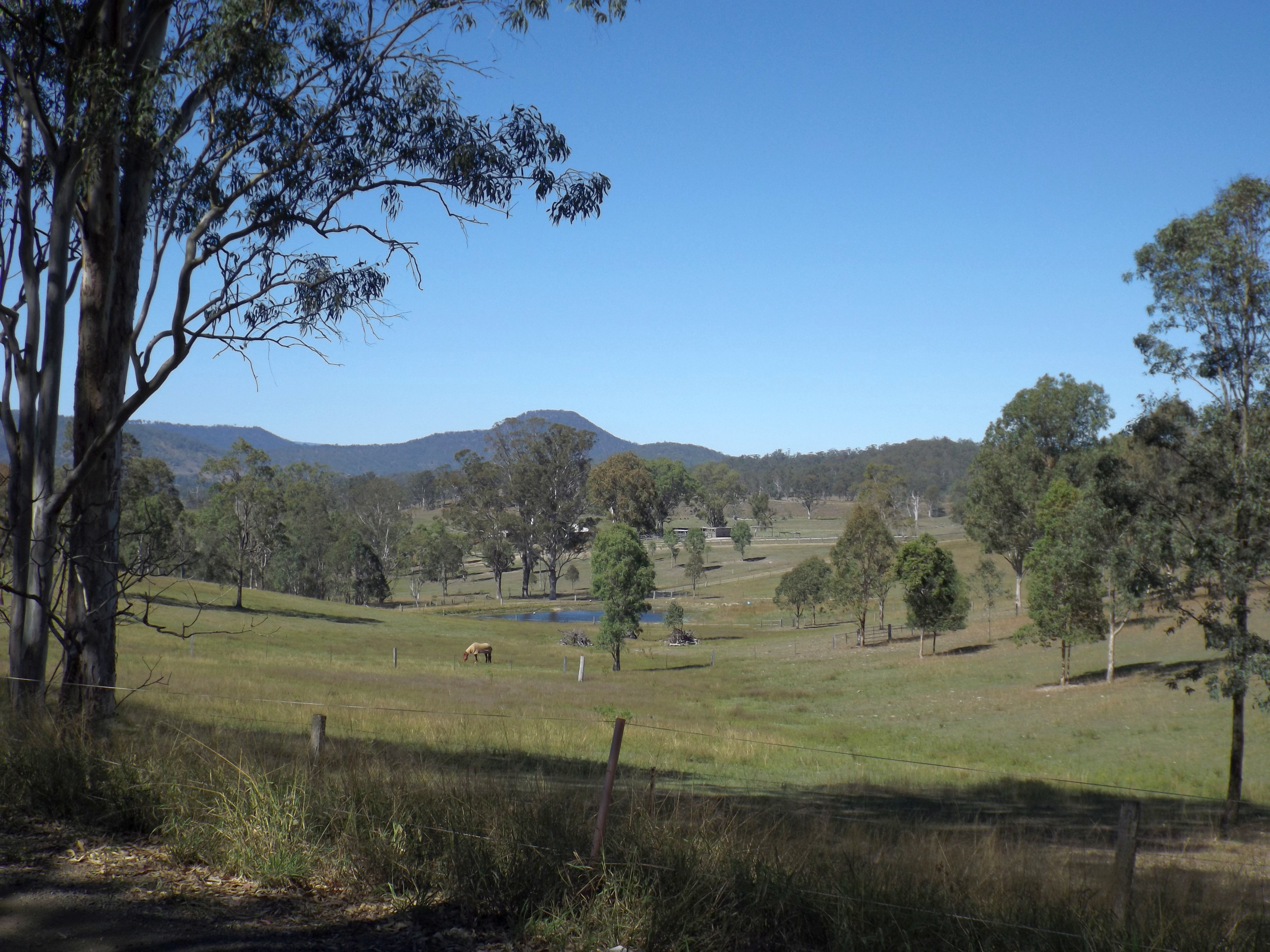
- Paddocks along Beaudesert Nerang Road, 2014

- Interactive map of Biddaddaba
- Coordinates: 27.9952°S 153.1086°E
- Country: Australia
- State: Queensland
- LGA: Scenic Rim Region
- Location: 14.0 km (8.7 mi) NW of Canungra; 16.4 km (10.2 mi) E of Beaudesert; 73.3 km (45.5 mi) S of Brisbane

Government
  - State electorate: Scenic Rim
  - Federal division: Wright

Area
  - Total: 42.3 km^{2} (16.3 sq mi)

Population
  - Total: 171 (2021 census)
  - Density: 4.043/km^{2} (10.47/sq mi)
- Time zone: UTC+10:00 (AEST)
- Postcode: 4275
Suburbs around Biddaddaba
| Tabragalba | Boyland | Wonglepong |
| Tabragalba | Biddaddaba | Benobble |
| Nindooinbah | Nindooinbah | Canungra |

Biddaddaba is a rural locality in the Scenic Rim Region, Queensland, Australia. In the 2021 census, Biddaddaba had a population of 171 people.

== Geography ==
Biddaddaba is nestled in a small valley formed by the Biddaddaba Creek, a tributary of Canungra Creek, itself a tributary of the Albert River. The heavily vegetated slopes of a ridge extending in a north/south direction and climbing to elevations of more than 500 metres (1,600 ft) above sea level, form a summit at Mount Misery in the east. In the west, Mount Tabragalba is the highest point along another ridge with roughly half the prominence. Several large dams are scattered throughout the locality.

The predominant land use is grazing on native vegetation.

== History ==
The locality takes its name from Biddaddaba Creek, which in turn was named with an Bundjalung language word burubi-da meaning place of koalas.

Biddaddaba Creek State School opened on 18 April 1933 and closed in 1959. It was at 363 Biddaddaba Creek Road (28.00111°S 153.11685°E).

On Sunday 6 October 1935, Archbishop James Duhig officially opened Our Lady of the Assumption Catholic Church. From March 1932, Catholic mass had been held in private homes in the district. The church was on a 0.25-acre (0.10 ha) block of land and was 27 by 15 feet (8.2 by 4.6 m) and capable of seating approximately 35 people (the congregation being 24 people at that time). Duhig commented that it was the smallest church he had opened. The church was at 67 Biddaddaba Creek Road (27.9774°S 153.1146°E). In the 1950s, the church building was relocated to Park Ridge where it continues to operate as Our Lady of the Assumption Catholic church (now within the boundaries of Park Ridge South).

== Demographics ==
In the 2016 census, Biddaddaba recorded a population of 171 people, 51.5% female and 48.5% male. The median age of the Biddaddaba population was 47 years, compared to the national median age of 38. 75.6% of people living in Biddaddaba were born in Australia. The other top responses for country of birth were England 4.4% and New Zealand 3.1%. 88.9% of people only spoke English at home.

In the 2021 census, Biddaddaba recorded a population of 171 people, 50.6% female and 49.4% male. The median age of the Biddaddaba population was 49 years, compared to the national median age of 38. 67.3% of people living in Biddaddaba were born in Australia. The other top responses for country of birth were New Zealand (7.6%), England (7.6%), Germany (2.9%) and France (1.8%). 86.5% of people only spoke English at home.

== Education ==
There are no schools in Biddaddaba. The nearest government primary schools are Beaudesert State School in Beaudesert to the west and Canungra State School in neighbouring Canungra to the south-east. The nearest government secondary school is Beaudesert State High School in Beaudesert.
