= Wonglepong QCWA Hall =

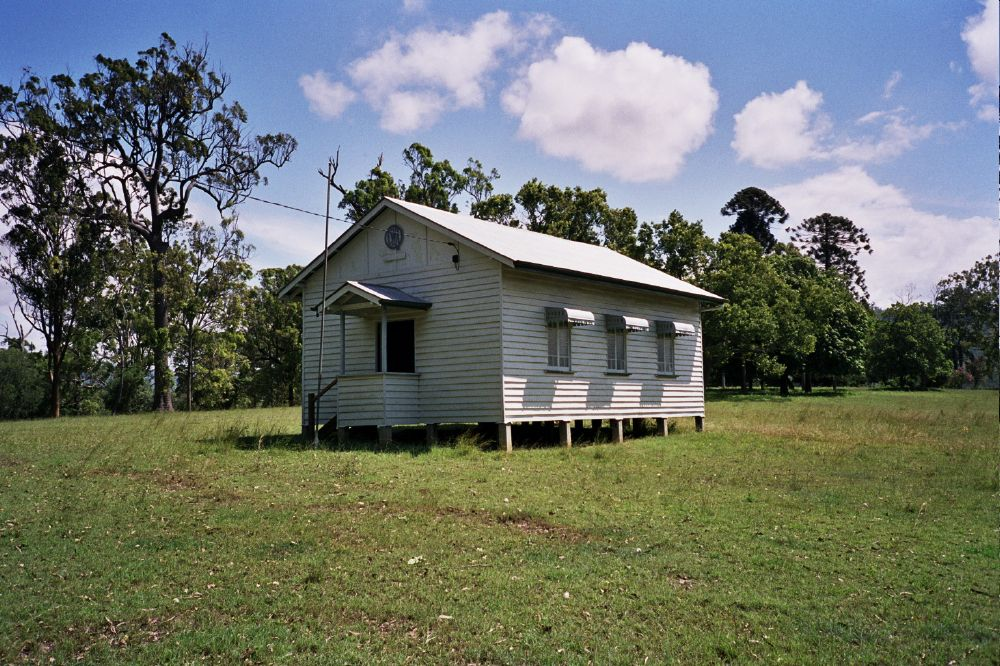
- Wonglepong QCWA Hall, 2006

- Location within Queensland Location within Australia
- 27.9731°S 153.1632°E
- Location: 2779 Beaudesert-Nerang Road, Wonglepong, Scenic Rim Region, Queensland, Australia

History
- Design period: 1919 - 1930s (interwar period)
- Built: 1935

Queensland Heritage Register
- Official name: Wonglepong QCWA Hall
- Type: state heritage (built)
- Designated: 11 November 2005
- Reference no.: 602549
- Significant period: 1935 (fabric); 1935-ongoing (social)
- Significant components: tank stand, furniture/fittings, objects (movable) - social/community
- Builders: EJ Franklin

Wonglepong QCWA Hall is a heritage-listed community hall at 2779 Beaudesert-Nerang Road, Wonglepong, Scenic Rim Region, Queensland, Australia. It was built in 1935 by EJ Franklin. It was added to the Queensland Heritage Register on 11 November 2005.

== History ==
Wonglepong Queensland Country Women's Association (QCWA) hall is a small, one roomed weatherboard structure in a rural setting. It is situated on a leasehold block in the district of Wonglepong north of Canungra in Beaudesert Shire (now Scenic Rim Region). The hall was built specifically for the Wonglepong branch of QCWA in 1935. The branch continues to use the hall and it remains largely unchanged from the time of its construction.

The decision to form QCWA was made at an open conference for country women hosted by the Brisbane Women's Club at Albert Hall in Brisbane in August 1922. At the time, Queensland was suffering severe drought and the conference was prompted by a desire to alleviate some of the problems being experienced by rural women. QCWA aimed to improve the quality of life of country women and children by providing opportunities for social interaction and recreation and by improving rural education and health. The Governor of Queensland, Sir Matthew Nathan, strongly supported the formation of the QCWA and accepted the position of Patron.

QCWA soon became an important part of rural communities. It grew rapidly with branches opening at Kingaroy, Warwick, Roma, Chinchilla and Allora in the four months after its foundation in August 1922. QCWA addressed specific needs of rural families with practical measures such as the provision of beachside holiday accommodation, mothers' rest rooms, bush nurse centers and student hostels. They worked to improve the knowledge and skills of rural women by hosting lectures, teaching handicrafts and home industries and maintaining libraries in their halls and meeting places. They lobbied government on a range of rural issues. Their halls were often focal points of the local community and their members were frequently active in other local organizations. QCWA was one of the most influential Australian women's organizations of the 20th century.

In 1925 when the Wonglepong branch of the QCWA was formed, Beaudesert Shire was a prosperous district of small farmers and timber workers. Closer settlement of the district began in the 1860s after the opening of the Logan Agricultural Reserve. From the early 1900s to the 1930s, the district boomed, sustained by dairying, cattle grazing and the timber industry. Dairying and grazing continued through the mid-20th century although restructuring of the dairy industry led to diversification and the development of larger properties.

QCWA was arguably the most significant women's organisation in the Upper Logan River and Albert Rivers district. The Wonglepong branch was among the first to be formed in the area, meeting for the first eight years in the home of the founding president, Ann Franklin. By the 1930s, Ann's health problems led members to take turns hosting meetings in their homes. However, transport presented a problem for many and membership had increased so the decision was made to build a hall. A building fund was started and by 1935, £58 had been raised. The hall was built on land leased to the branch by the Franklin family on a 99-year term. The timber for the hall, believed to have originated from the Franklin's property, was milled at Geo Franklin's hardwood mill at Canungra. E. J. Franklin, the son of Ann, was the supervising carpenter and members' husbands assisted him on a voluntary basis. The hall was opened on 4 December 1935 by Mrs Buchanan, President of Central Division, QCWA. The branch started a library in the year of the hall's construction. In 1937, the hall was lined and a library cabinet was built with matching hardwood boards sourced from the property.

Members donated the furnishings of the hall. These include a number of pews that were made for the branch by E. J. Franklin. The original pattern for the pews is stored in the hall. The President's chair was donated by a member of the Franklin family in memory of his mother, Jane. The creed and motto were painted by Frank Tunley, the brother of the founding Secretary, A. G. Campbell.

The hall remains largely intact from the date of its construction and it is comprehensively documented. The library cabinet and lining of the hall have never been painted. The cabinet contains a collection of books most of which date from the period when the library was established. The only substantial changes to the hall have been the addition of a kitchen and the restumping of the hall in 1965, the painting of the exterior in 1975 and the replacement of the corrugated iron roof in 1983. The branch has preserved all of the minutes of meetings since its inception and it is one of the few QCWA branches to have preserved its records for this length of time.

From the late 20th century, the Wonglepong area began to change from a farming community to a rural residential area and since the 1960s membership of QCWA throughout Queensland has declined. However, the Wonglepong Branch remains active and is one of the few QCWA branches that still function in the Scenic Rim Region.

== Description ==
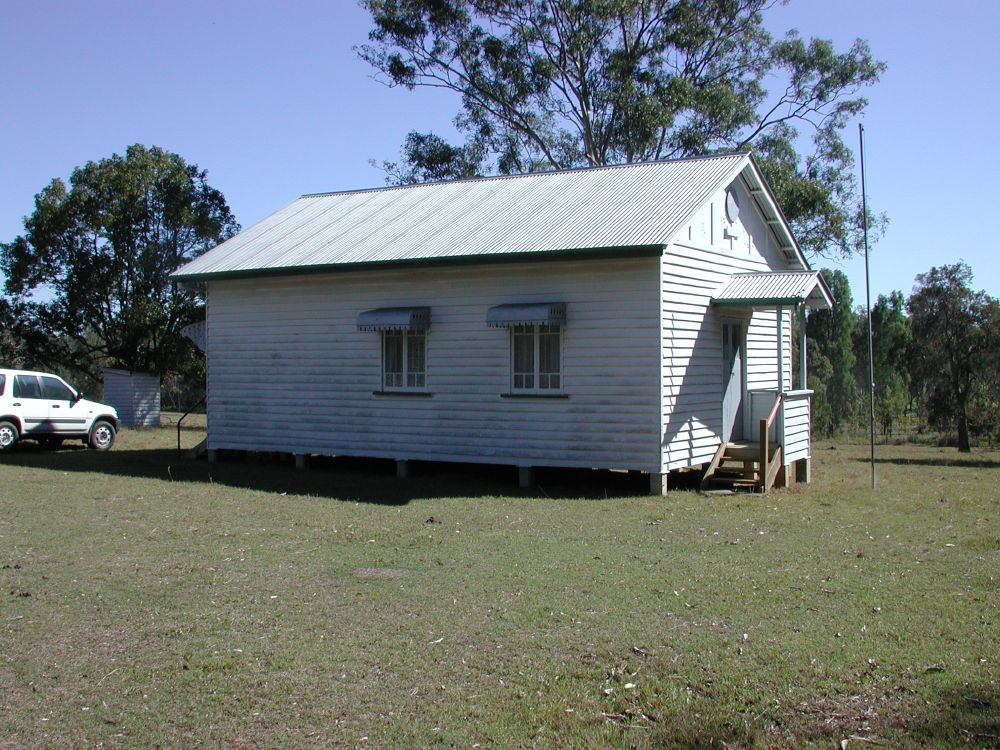
Side view, 2006

The QCWA hall is situated in a grassy paddock about 35 metres (115 ft) back from Beaudesert - Nerang Road at Wonglepong. It is on a small leasehold block within a forty-five hectare farm.

The hall is rectangular in plan, about nine metres long and six metres wide. There are few decorative features apart from the QCWA symbol on the gable above the entrance. The structure is timber framed and clad with weatherboard. Access at the front of the building is via a small porch and a set of double, framed doors. Each door has a square frosted glass window fitted near the top. The building has an unpainted corrugated iron gabled roof pitched at about 30 degrees. Concrete stumps have been used to replace the original timber.

The entrance porch is centred on the eastern side of the building. Access to the porch is gained via a small set of steps on the southeastern side. The external sides of the porch are partially clad with weatherboards with about two-thirds of each side open to the roof.

All of the windows are centre opening casements. Each window is divided into five lights arranged as a large rectangle bracketed with two small square lights at the top and bottom.

Three windows open into the northwestern side and two into the southeastern side. Each window is covered with a curved metal hood.

Rear access is via a wooden ledged and braced door at the southwestern end of the rear elevation. A metal awning projects from the top of the door opening and the door is approached via a set of steps. A corrugated iron water tank with a timber tank stand is positioned near the center of the rear elevation.

The interior of the hall comprises a single room with a polished timber floor, lined with unpainted hardwood. The library cabinet is built into the wall to the right of the main entrance. It is made from vertical hardwood boards that match the lining of the hall. A pair of hinged doors also made from vertical hardwood boards gives access to the interior of the cabinet.

The hall is furnished with a number of tables, four wooden pews, a bench and an upright piano. A selection of photographs and printed material including the QCWA creed and motto and a World War I memorial are hung on the walls.

The kitchen cupboards, constructed in 1965 are located against the wall opposite the main entrance. These are not heritage-listed.

== Heritage listing ==
Wonglepong QCWA Hall was listed on the Queensland Heritage Register on 11 November 2005 having satisfied the following criteria.

The place is important in demonstrating the evolution or pattern of Queensland's history.

The Wonglepong QCWA Hall is important in demonstrating the pattern of Queensland's history. QCWA was one of the most influential women's organisations of the 20th century. It was formed as a response by country women to the hardships and isolation experienced historically by families in Queensland's rural districts. The organization was, and remains, an important part of the State's rural communities. The Wonglepong Branch is a typical example of a small country QCWA branch and its history is among the best documented in Queensland. It has preserved the minutes of its meetings since its inception in 1925, just three years after the foundation of QCWA. Its hall is highly intact and largely unchanged from the date of its construction in 1935.

The place is important in demonstrating the principal characteristics of a particular class of cultural places.

The building demonstrates the principal characteristics of a small QCWA hall from the first half of the 20th century. Located in a rural district, it is set well back from the road in a paddock on a small rural property. The QCWA symbol is displayed prominently above the entrance. The QCWA creed and motto are hung in frames on the walls together with a World War I honour roll. The small library in the hall is a typical feature of many QCWA branches that maintained libraries for the education of their members.

The place has a strong or special association with a particular community or cultural group for social, cultural or spiritual reasons.

The building has a special association with the local members of QCWA and the branch is well known within QCWA throughout the State. The land on which the hall is situated was leased to QCWA by the founding president and her son supervised the hall's construction with member's husbands assisting him on a voluntary basis. Members donated the furnishings of the hall including a number of pews made by the son of the founding president. The brother of the founding secretary painted the creed and motto.
