= Canungra railway line =

Branch railway in Queensland, Australia

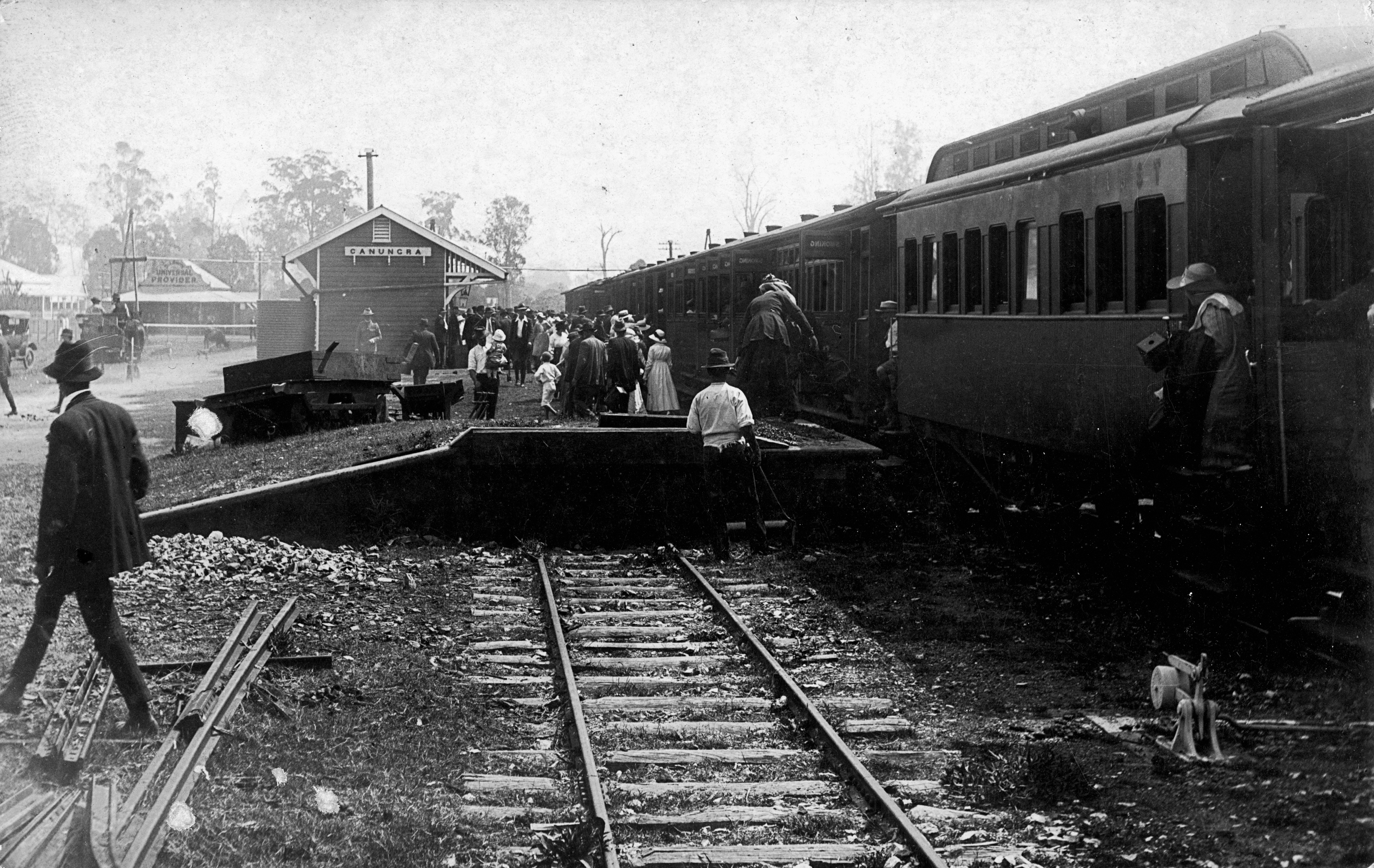
- Canungra station, ca. 1918

Overview
- Status: Closed
- Owner: Queensland Rail
- Locale: South East Queensland
- Termini: Logan Village; Canungra
- Continues from: Beaudesert line

Service
- Operator(s): Queensland Rail

History
- Opened: 2 July 1915
- Closed: 1 June 1955

Technical
- Line length: 33.1 km (20.6 mi)
- Track gauge: 1,067 mm (3 ft 6 in)

The Canungra railway line was a branch railway in South East Queensland, Australia. It connected Logan Village on the Beaudesert line and Canungra.

Canungra was the centre of regional timber production from the 1860s with a large sawmill completed in 1885. The private Laheys Tramway, carrying timber from nearby forests to Canungra, opened in 1900. By 1911 there were 18 bullock teams moving sawn timber between Canungra and the railway at Logan Village.

A railway from Logan Village to Canungra was first proposed in 1900 with a survey commissioned in 1908. In 1911 the Queensland Government decided to construct the Canungra branch line from Logan Village railway station on the Beaudesert line to Canungra. Construction began in 1913 and the line opened to Canungra on 2 July 1915.

Timber traffic started to decline from 1923 and most of the timber in the area had been cut by the 1940s. There was substantial traffic on the line during the Pacific War after the Jungle Warfare Training Centre opened at Canungra in November 1942. Traffic declined after World War II, and the line closed on 1 July 1955.

== Route ==
Station	Coordinates	Notes
Logan Village	27.7686°S 153.1081°E	
Plunkett	27.8486°S 153.14071°E	
Tamborine	27.8796°S 153.1298°E	
Bromfleet	27.9057°S 153.1129°E	
Boyland	27.9439°S 153.132°E	
Wonglepong	27.9716°S 153.1628°E	
Benobble	27.9950°S 153.1617°E	
Canungra	28.0179°S 153.1625°E	

== See also ==
- Rail transport in Queensland
