= Wyambyn =

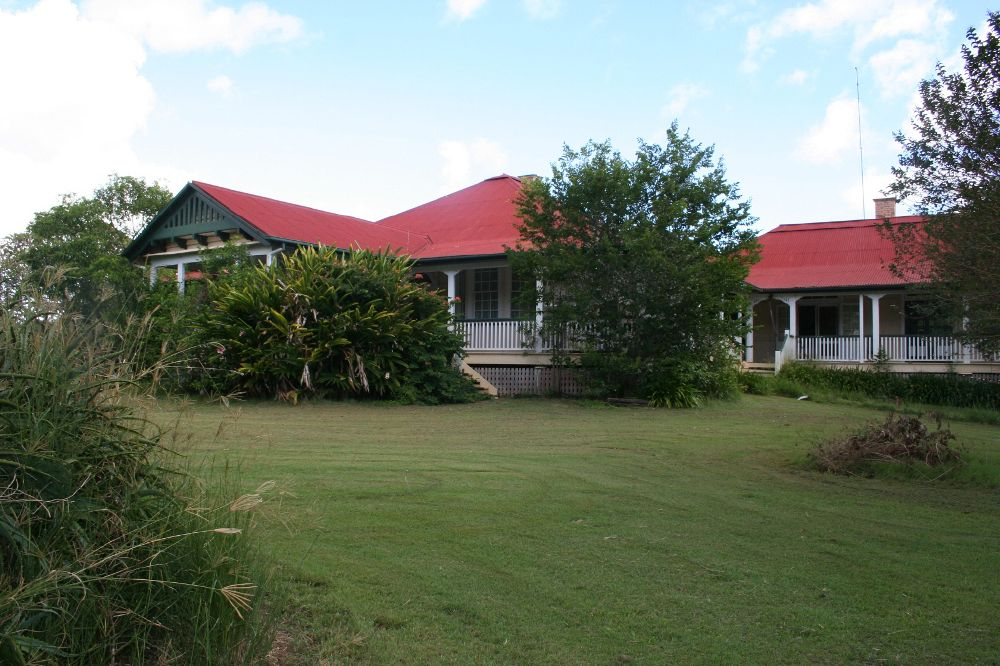
- Wyambyn, 2011

- Location within Queensland Location within Australia
- 28.0028°S 153.0478°E
- Location: Tabragalba House Road, Tabragalba, Scenic Rim Region, Queensland, Australia

History
- Design period: 1900 - 1914 (early 20th century)
- Built: 1909
- Built for: De Burgh Bannatyne Bentinck Persse

Site notes
- Architect: Robin Dods
- Architectural style: Arts & Crafts

Queensland Heritage Register
- Official name: Wyambyn
- Type: state heritage
- Designated: 9 August 2013
- Reference no.: 602821
- Builders: Warren and Morgan

Wyambyn is a heritage-listed homestead at Tabragalba House Road, Tabragalba, Scenic Rim Region, Queensland, Australia. It was designed in 1908 by Robin Dods and built by Warren and Morgan from 1908 to 1909. It was added to the Queensland Heritage Register on 9 August 2013. The large timber homestead was built for pastoralist and businessman De Burgh Bannatyne Bentinck Persse.

== History ==
Wyambyn (1909), located 6.5 kilometres (4.0 mi) east of Beaudesert, was designed by eminent architect Robert Smith (Robin) Dods as a large homestead for pastoralist and businessman De Burgh Bannatyne Bentinck Persse.

Moreton pastoral district, in present-day south-east Queensland, was settled in 1841 as part of the pastoral expansion from the south that had resulted in the occupation of the Darling Downs in 1840. Early runs included Nindooinbah and Mundoolun on the Albert River. The Moreton and Darling Downs pastoral districts, with sufficient rainfall, nutritious natural pastures and nearby markets, were the most viable of Queensland's pastoral districts. Both were opened for selection of small agricultural and pastoral blocks from the 1860s. This resulted in the progressive freehold purchase, after resumption, of large pastoral properties, often by their lessees as well as other selectors.

Early pastoralists in the Beaudesert district, the Collins and the De Burgh Persse families, selected land in this manner. The Collins family took up Mundoolun station in the 1840s and became wealthy pastoralists with many properties throughout Queensland including Tamrookum and Nindooinbah near the town of Beaudesert. De Burgh Fitzpatrick Persse purchased the nearby Tabragalba station in 1865 and by the late 1880s had freeholded an extensive tract of land.

Both the De Burgh Persse and Collins families were important in the development of Queensland. They were active in public life, serving in the Queensland Parliament and in local government, and held positions on important company boards, many with a pastoral influence. The families had mutual interests and, over time, friendship and intermarriage created an interconnected and influential dynastic pastoral empire.

Wyambyn was built on land selected in Jane Collins' name, approximately halfway between the De Burgh Persse and Collins homesteads. The land, comprising 419 acres and 20 perches (169.61 ha), was purchased in June 1908 by De Burgh Persse in anticipation of his marriage to Fannie Martin Collins on 21 April 1909. The design of Wyambyn commenced soon after the land purchase, and in July 1908 a tender notice was placed by Dods for its construction; a job won by local builders, Warren and Morgan.

Dods (1868–1920) was a New Zealand-born architect who lived briefly in Britain before coming to Brisbane in the 1870s. He later trained as an architect in Scotland and England under a number of esteemed architects who were working in the Arts and Crafts idiom. His architectural career began in Edinburgh in 1886, articled with architects Hay & Henderson. He attended evening classes at the Edinburgh Architectural Association until 1890 and formed a lasting friendship with (Sir) Robert Lorimer (1864–1929), eminent Scottish architect and fellow proponent of Arts and Crafts. In 1890 Dods moved to London, where he worked with the Fortifications Branch of the War Office and in the office of notable architect (Sir) Aston Webb. In 1891 he was admitted to the Royal Institute of British Architects and travelled in Italy. In 1894 Dods visited his mother in Brisbane and while there won a competition for a nurses home at the Brisbane General Hospital (see also Royal Brisbane Hospital Nurses' Homes). He returned to Brisbane in 1896 and started in practice with architect Francis Richard Hall as Hall & Dods. Dods has been acknowledged as "one of the most significant early 20th century Australian architects" and as a rare practitioner of the Arts and Crafts style in Queensland.

Arts and Crafts was an international design movement flourishing between 1860 and 1910, its influence continuing into the 1930s. It was led by artist and writer William Morris and architect Charles Voysey and was inspired by the writings of John Ruskin and Augustus Pugin. The style championed traditional craftsmanship using simple forms and often applied medieval, romantic or folk styles of decoration. Importantly, it valued local variations in traditions so that good design would have relevance within its context. Arts and Crafts architecture is characterised by solidity and heaviness through well-proportioned solid forms, wide porches and prominent steep roofs. The texture of ordinary materials is expressed in the detailing and building composition is asymmetrical.

The practice of Hall & Dods was the most influential source of modern design in Brisbane, producing a wide range of accomplished buildings, and was credited with achieving an "architectural revolution" in Brisbane. Dods was responsible for most of the design within the firm, integrating contemporary British design philosophies with the traditions of Queensland housing and the requirements of a subtropical climate, and producing practical, attractive, and finely detailed houses. The partnership ended in 1913, when Dods left to practice in Sydney. Dods died prematurely in 1920.

Dods' residential work employed local building techniques combined with a sophisticated discipline and a common-sense response to climate. Dods' houses were mostly built of timber with detailing that was a celebration of craftsmanship. The most noticeable characteristic of his Queensland houses (built between 1896 and 1917) was a general feeling of solidity and substance. This was the result of a number of design decisions, including designing a generous roof (often the largest element) continuous over the verandah and over a lower, rear washhouse. The roof was always simple in geometry and often finished with terracotta tiles, flat shingles or pan-and-tile profile, flat iron sheeting with a prominent rolled joint. Corrugated iron was only used where it was necessary to reduce the cost. Generally low-set, the houses often had an enclosed or screened understorey to give the house a visually solid base. Individual elements were oversized to appear substantial as if under heavy loads. Bold, dark, earthy colours, darkly stained timber, rough-sawn weatherboards with mitred corners, roughcast rendering and face brickwork in dark colours were used to give the house a weighty gravity. The building materials and finishes were chosen to allow the building to mellow over time, providing it with a well-established appearance.

The house designs take a formalist approach to planning, including formal entry halls and traditional planning arrangements. The plans were generated through a consideration of aspect, with living spaces well oriented and internal layouts permitting cross ventilation. They are also notable for their informal spaces, a particular feature being the inclusion of generous verandah piazzas. The plans respond to the social needs of the clients in an honest and functional way. The houses were often provided with generous, considered service spaces including back halls and wash houses. The health and comfort of the occupants were major considerations. Ventilation devices included wide window and door openings, ventilated gables and ridges, and ventilation fleches. Piazzas were generous, allowing comfortably furnished, semi-outdoor living. Operable shading and enclosure of the piazza was sometimes achieved by adding timber vertical louvres above the verandah handrail, creating a room habitable in most weather. Interiors included fine decorative timber joinery and panelling. Fireplace surrounds and built-in cupboards were also a feature.

The composition of facades and circulation routes is a more nuanced element of Dods' houses and highlights his originality and artistic skill. Facades often only implied symmetry. Entries were often off-centre or perpendicular, emphasised by wide and expressive entry stairs. Projecting bay windows and corner fireplaces were recurrent elements.

Dods designed gardens as a setting for the house, a practice more common in Britain than in Queensland. They featured formal parterre gardens, terraces and walls, flower beds, tennis courts, hedges, topiaries, flowering ornamental trees, and geometric path and lawn layouts. Garden furniture and structures were designed including seats, pergolas, trellises, fences and gates.

Wyambyn is an example of the homesteads built by the more successful pastoralists of south-east Queensland. As funds became available over time, they built comfortable, architect-designed homes or extended their earlier homesteads into residences more befitting their status.

Between 1901 and 1913 Dods designed and built six homesteads for rural properties: Langlo Downs, Augathella (1903, destroyed by fire); extension to Nindooinbah Homestead, Beaudesert (1908); Ringsfield, Nanango (1908); Wyambyn, Beaudesert (1909); Myendetta, Charleville (1910); and Kengoon, Kalbar (1913). These were large dwellings that often formed the centre of groups of outbuildings. Their garden layouts were also an important feature.

Rural homesteads built in Queensland in the early part of the 20th century were large homes, often on elevated (flood-free) sites with a scenic outlook, surrounded by gardens. As well as those listed above, Marshlands near Hivesville (1910) designed by Hall & Dods (but not believed to be Dods' design) was built during this period, as was Hidden Vale near Grandchester (Eaton & Bates, 1903).

The Collins family knew Dods and his work. He had supervised the building of the Buckeridge-designed St John's Church at Mundoolun station in 1901, which commemorated the lives of their parents, John and Ann Collins. In 1906 Dods designed additions to Nindooinbah homestead for William Collins that were completed in 1908. Dods and the Collins and Persse men may have met through their membership of the Queensland Club: Dods became a member in 1898, William Collins from 1877, Robert M Collins in 1895, and John G Collins in 1897, while DBB Persse joined in 1907 and his father in 1874.

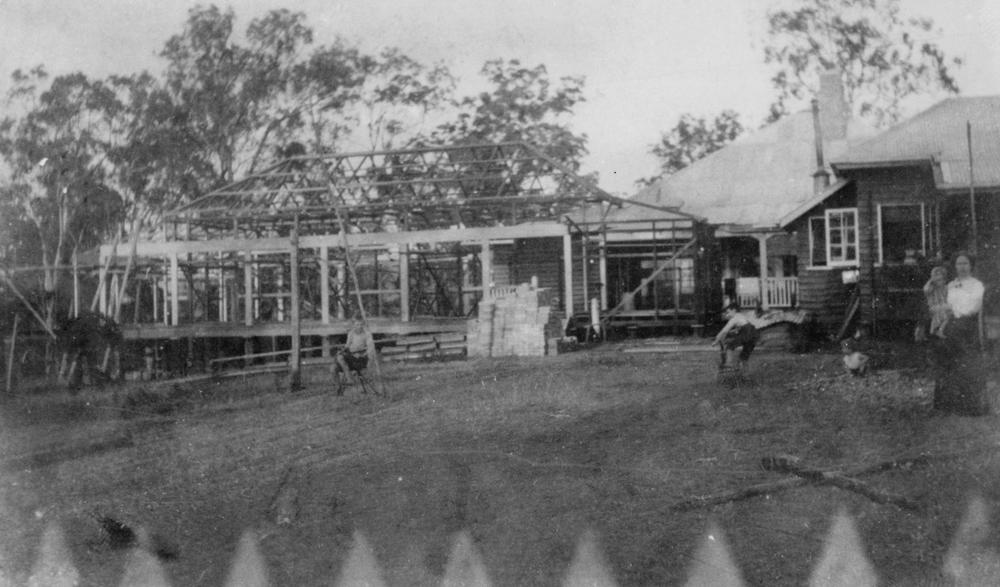
Building extension, 1919

Dods also designed Wyambyn's extension, which was completed by 1912, to accommodate the growing family. The extension comprised a northern wing that included a nursery and extra bedrooms. It was later used as additional bedrooms and a school room.

It is possible that Dods also designed the tennis court at Wyambyn. It appears in early photographs and is in harmony with the overall design; the entry stair and net are aligned with the piazza and a large jacaranda tree.

Initially, Wyambyn operated as a cattle property. However, in the mid-1920s De Burgh Persse re-introduced sheep to the district, as did other properties in the Beaudesert area run by family members, namely, Mundoolun (DM Fraser) and Tabragalba (Charles de Burgh Persse), owing to the decline of beef returns and the rise of wool prices at this time.

De Burgh Bennatyne Bentinck Persse was not purely a pastoralist dependent on the land. Like his father, he was involved in business enterprises and took over most of his father's directorships. He served as chairman of directors of the Raub Australian Gold Mining Company; the Queensland Meat Export Company; and the Australian Stockbreeders' Co. He was also a member of the advisory board of the National Bank of Australasia.

After D B B Persse's death on 10 December 1947 Wyambyn with its 419 acres (170 ha) passed to his second son, Burton Persse. He resided there with his family, operating a dairy from soon after his return from World War II service until the late 1970s. The property then changed to beef cattle production. In 1981 Wyambyn was sold, and subsequently used for farming and grazing purposes. However, following the Queensland Government's Glendower Dam proposal in 1990, which would inundate Nindooinbah, Tabragalba and Wyambyn land, Wyambyn was compulsorily acquired by the South East Queensland Water Board. After acquisition, the land was leased for use as an organic dairy, then for cattle grazing.

Various assessments of Wyambyn have been made. The Land Court judgement in the case Vadoog Pty Ltd verses South East Queensland Water Board stated: "A feature of the property is its imposing homestead, constructed in about 1908 and maintained in excellent order". Three architectural studies and assessments between 1971 and 2002 have occurred, culminating in its inclusion and assessment in a doctoral thesis on the significance of Dods' architecture to Australia.

Furthermore, the architectural importance of Wyambyn is supported by its inclusion in two documents assessing Dods' work and 20th century Queensland architecture. The homestead was proposed by the Queensland sub-committee of the Australian Institute of Architects (AIA) Heritage Taskforce on Significant 20th Century Queensland Architecture as being of national importance and included in a draft list of nationally significant places produced on 17 September 2007.

Some changes to the homestead have occurred. In October 1936 a fire started in a chip heater chimney in the homestead's ceiling and destroyed the ceiling and rafters of the bathroom on the western wing. There is evidence of a more recent fire in the laundry. The kitchen was changed from a wood stove with marble bench tops to a modern stove plus laminated bench tops in the 1960s. The small verandah in the service wing was enclosed as an eating area for Burton Persse and his family. The two original bathrooms have been altered; one was modernised and the other stripped and converted to an office by 1971. The wall between the former cook's room and the kitchen has been removed. In 1996 the roofing was noted as corrugated iron. However, Dods favoured flat iron roofing, and this appears to be the roofing in a photograph taken in 1919. The vertical timber blinds around the piazza, apparent in early photographs, have been removed.

The homestead has been depicted in promotional material for the region and featured as the setting for the movie Unfinished Sky in 2007. The Glendower Dam proposal has not progressed, and in 2013 the property is leased for grazing purposes and administered by the Department of Natural Resources and Mines.

== Description ==
Wyambyn is a large timber homestead with garden surrounded by lightly wooded land in the Albert River valley, approximately 6.5 kilometres (4.0 mi) east of Beaudesert. The house sits on a rise, approached from a long, unsealed drive from the north-east curving around to the rear of the house and continuing on to Nindooinbah homestead, 2.5 kilometres (1.6 mi) south. It sits in a house yard containing large specimen trees and a grass tennis court. The front of the house faces east and affords striking, panoramic views of the surrounding valley and ranges.

Wyambyn is a single-storeyed, timber-framed, low-set building encircled by wide verandahs. It comprises a main section, a northern wing, and a western service wing. The hipped roof is large and clad with corrugated metal sheeting with a ventilated ridge cap and two face brick chimneys with cement-rendered moulding. The verandahs have ceilings of v-jointed timber boards lined on the rake, large timber posts with timber brackets, timber balustrades, and Crows Ash, shot-edge floor boards, painted on the outside perimeter. The verandah walls are single-skin, timber v-jointed boards with stop-chamfered timber framing exposed externally. Other external walls are weatherboards. The understorey is enclosed by timber lattice (front) and timber battens (elsewhere).

The house is designed with minimal decorative elements, in a scale and form sitting low and securely within the landscape. The front elevation of the main section is symmetrically composed around a generous, projecting verandah piazza sheltered by a large gable with a battened gable end. The piazza balustrades and soffits show evidence of previous enclosure. The ceiling of the piazza is lined with flat, v-jointed boards and the roof space is ventilated in the gable end by spaced weatherboards to the apex.

The verandah wraps around the house on the remaining elevations with some corners enclosed to form small rooms. The verandah is accessed by timber stairs, to either side of the piazza. The central front entrance door is flanked by large bay windows with double-hung timber sashes of many small panes. The entry door is timber with six panels and bolection moulding, sidelights, a semi-circular fanlight, and moulded timber architrave.

The main section of the house has a central hallway with living rooms on the south and bedrooms on the north. Generally, the interior has clear-finished, timber board floors; single-skin timber board partitions with moulded timber skirtings, belt rails, picture rails, architraves and cornices; and v-jointed, timber board ceilings. The cornices of the principal rooms are wider and more elaborate. Much of the timber in the house is stained dark. The drawing and dining rooms are connected by a pair of large timber doors and the dining room has a large brick fireplace with a panelled timber fire surround. The house has built-in timber cupboards with timber shelves and a built-in timber book shelf with moulded architraves in the hall. Large, glazed French doors with moulded panels and hinged fanlights open onto the verandah from all rooms. Interior doors are panelled timber with operable timber fanlights.

The northern wing rooms are accessed from the verandah. One room contains a fireplace with a carved and moulded timber surround and an adjacent built-in timber seat and cupboard. Some doors of this wing retain early timber framed flyscreen doors. There are large built-in timber cupboards on the verandah.

A verandah walkway connects the rear of the main section of the house to the service wing. On one side of the walkway is the dairy, a small flyscreen and timber lattice-enclosed room with timber shelving.

The service wing comprises an enclosed eastern verandah, a kitchen and large pantry with timber shelves, a living space, and a laundry. The laundry is at ground level with a rear door into the yard and a small timber stair up to the kitchen. The laundry windows are corrugated metal, top-hung shutters.

Throughout the house, original brass door and window furniture survives.

The garden contains mature trees, lawns, and garden beds. To the east of the house are a large Jacaranda and a tennis court, both positioned on axis with the front of the main section of the house. The court has brick retaining walls with a set of brick steps. It retains an early timber net post with metal winder. The flat grass court sits within the sloping landscape and the distant mountains form a backdrop creating a dramatic and scenic setting.

== Heritage listing ==
Wyambyn was listed on the Queensland Heritage Register on 9 August 2013 having satisfied the following criteria.

The place is important in demonstrating the evolution or pattern of Queensland's history.

Wyambyn (1909) is important in illustrating the contribution of notable architect, Robert Smith (Robin) Dods, to the evolution of Queensland architecture.

It also provides evidence of the affluent lifestyle enjoyed by pioneer pastoralists of south-east Queensland who were able to freehold much of their land and erect substantial homesteads.

The place demonstrates rare, uncommon or endangered aspects of Queensland's cultural heritage.

As one of only six Queensland homesteads designed by acclaimed architect Robin Dods, Wyambyn is a rare and intact example of his homestead designs.

The place is important in demonstrating the principal characteristics of a particular class of cultural places.

Wyambyn is an intact example of the residential work of Dods. Designed in an Arts and Crafts idiom, the low-set timber house has deliberately oversized timber elements and openings; verandah piazza; steep dominant roof; finely detailed, built-in timber furniture; a well-considered service zone; and an interior layout that optimises cross ventilation and solar orientation.

The place is important because of its aesthetic significance.

The house is low-set with a steeply pitched roof, surrounded in a pastoral landscape with a valley and mountainous view to the east, north, and south. There is also a garden and tennis court. The relationship between the built elements and the natural landscape is vividly scenic.

A sense of gracious rural domesticity is engendered by its wide verandahs and piazza and spacious living rooms.

Highly intact, Wyambyn is important for its Arts and Crafts aesthetic, notably for its fine craftsmanship, high quality materials and skilful arrangement of informal and formal living spaces.

The aesthetic significance of Wyambyn has been recognised in film and used in promotional imagery for the region.

The place has a special association with the life or work of a particular person, group or organisation of importance in Queensland's history.

Wyambyn is important for its association over more than 70 years with the De Burgh Persse and Collins families, who are notable for their contribution to the pastoral industry and public life in Queensland over more than 150 years. Not only pioneer pastoralists of the Beaudesert district, the families have also served in the Queensland Parliament, initiated Queensland's National Parks system, promoted beef exports as directors of the Queensland Meat Export Co., and controlled pastoral empires extending to the Northern Territory and South Australia.
