= Tabragalba, Queensland =

Tabragalba
- Suburb
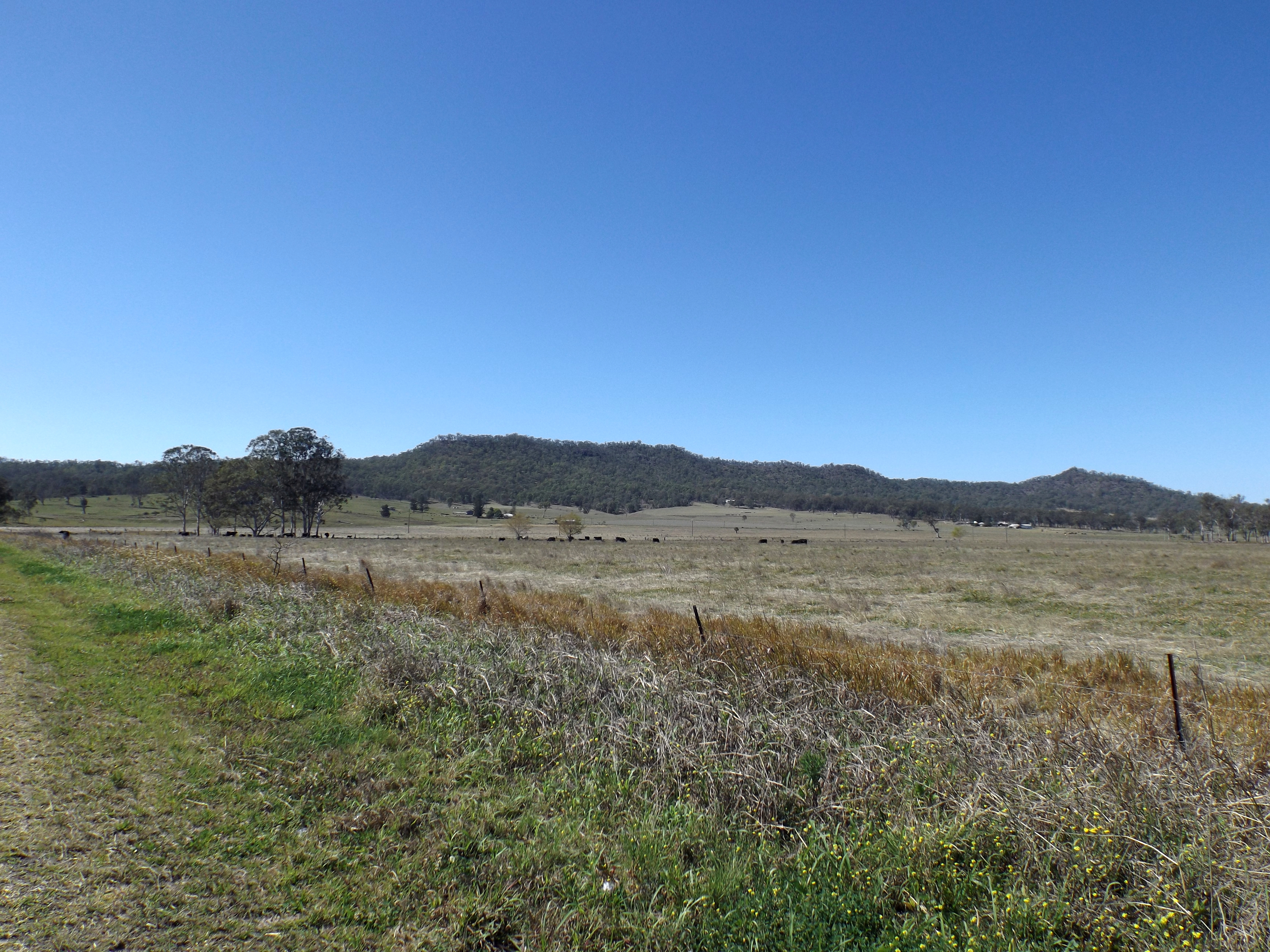
- Paddocks along Beaudesert Nerang Road, 2014

- Interactive map of Tabragalba
- Coordinates: 27.9919°S 153.0663°E
- Country: Australia
- State: Queensland
- LGA: Scenic Rim Region
- Location: 10.5 km (6.5 mi) E of Beaudesert; 20.9 km (13.0 mi) W of Canungra; 70.6 km (43.9 mi) S of Brisbane CBD

Government
  - State electorate: Scenic Rim
  - Federal division: Wright

Area
  - Total: 26.5 km^{2} (10.2 sq mi)

Population
  - Total: 48 (2021 census)
  - Density: 1.811/km^{2} (4.69/sq mi)
- Time zone: UTC+10:00 (AEST)
- Postcode: 4285
Suburbs around Tabragalba
Beaudesert	Birnam	Boyland
Beaudesert	Tabragalba	Biddaddaba
Beaudesert	Nindooinbah	Nindooinbah

Tabragalba is a rural locality in the Scenic Rim Region of South East Queensland, Australia. In the 2021 census, Tabragalba had a population of 48 people.

== Geography ==
The eastern border of Tabragalba follows a ridge line and includes Mount Tabragalba. Part of the western boundary is marked by the Albert River. Agriculture is the predominant land use.

The Beaudesert–Nerang Road (locally named Beaudesert–Beenleigh Road) runs in from the west, and then traverses the northern end. The Beaudesert–Beenleigh Road runs away to the north-east from the north-west boundary.

== History ==
The locality takes its name from a local pastoral station established in 1843. The name is from the Bundjalung language dhaberi gaba meaning the place of club or nulla nulla.

The name was also used for an early local government area called Tabragalba Division (established 1879) which became the Shire of Tabragalba (1903), then renamed a few months later as Shire of Beaudesert. In 2008, the shire was merged into the new Scenic Rim Region.

Tabragalba Provisional School opened on 24 April 1907. On 1 January 1909 it became Tabragalba State School. It closed on 11 July 1945.

== Demographics ==
In the 2016 census, Tabragalba had a population of 49 people.

In the 2021 census, Tabragalba had a population of 48 people.

== Heritage listings ==
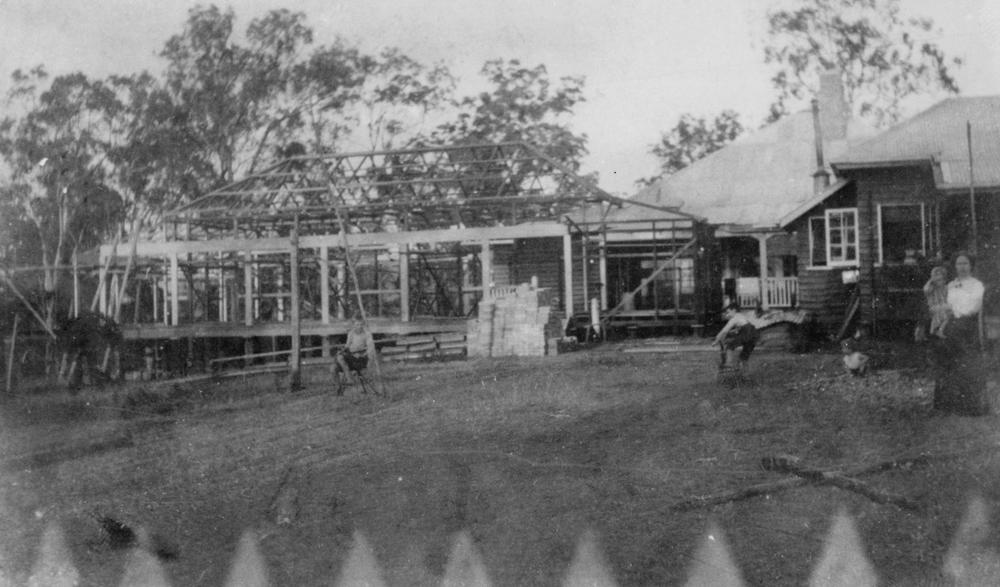
Extension construction at Wyambyn station, 1910

Tabragalba has a heritage listing for Wyambyn in Tabragalba House Road. The Wyambyn homestead was designed by Robin Dods and built in 1909. The design features the Arts and Crafts architectural style. Cattle were originally raised on the property until the 1920s when sheep became more profitable. The homestead was used as a setting in the movie Unfinished Sky in 2007.

== Education ==
There are no schools in Tabragalba. The nearest government primary schools are Beaudesert State School in neighbouring Beaudesert to the west and Canungra State School in Canungra to the east. The nearest government secondary school is Beaudesert State High School, also in Beaudesert. There are also Catholic primary and secondary schools in Beaudesert.

== Amenities ==
There is a rifle range and pistol club in Sprengler Road (27.9975°S 153.0683°E).
