= Binna Burra =

Binna Burra may refer to:

- Binna Burra, Queensland
  - Binna Burra (lodge)
  - Binna Burra Cultural Landscape
- Binna Burra, New South Wales
