= Binna Burra Cultural Landscape =

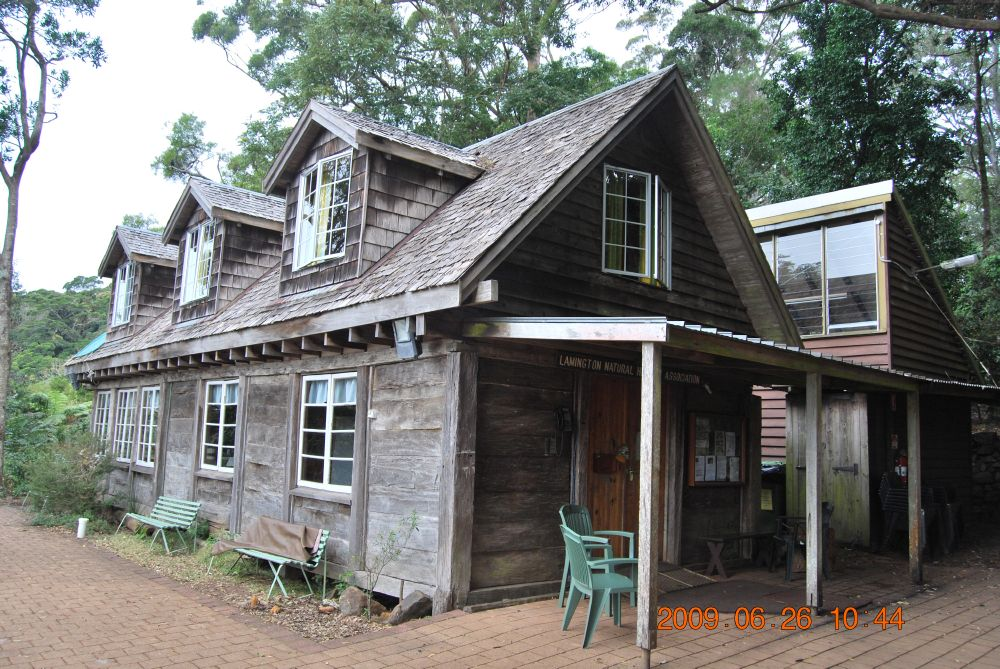
- Binna Burra Mountain Lodge (2009)

- Location within Queensland Location within Australia
- 28.1955°S 153.1889°E
- Location: Binna Burra Road, Binna Burra, Queensland, Australia

History
- Design period: 1919 - 1930s (interwar period)
- Built: 1934 - c. 1980

Queensland Heritage Register
- Official name: Binna Burra Cultural Landscape
- Type: state heritage (built, landscape)
- Designated: 31 December 2002
- Reference no.: 601899
- Significant period: 1934-1980 (fabric); 1934-ongoing (historical)
- Significant components: lodge, well, memorial - wall, pump house, cabin/s, plantings - exotic, terracing, machinery/plant/equipment - recreation/entertainment, natural landscape, garden - native, residential accommodation - housing, trees of social, historic or special significance, hide (wildlife observation), track, engine/generator shed/room / power supply, machinery/plant/equipment - utilities - water supply

Binna Burra Cultural Landscape includes Binna Burra Lodge, a sustainable, heritage-listed nature-based accommodation and services provider at Binna Burra Road, Binna Burra, Queensland, Australia. Commencing with a camp in 1933, buildings commenced from 1934 to c. 1980. It was added to the Queensland Heritage Register on 31 December 2002. All of the heritage-listed lodge and adjacent accommodation buildings were destroyed during the September 2019 bushfires.

== History ==
In 1930 Romeo Lahey, who had played a significant role in having Lamington National Park gazetted in 1915, met Arthur Groom, a freelance journalist 17 years his junior. It was a meeting destined to form an association for nature conservation in and of national parks. At the meeting the National Parks Association of Queensland (NPAQ) was established. This was the first National Parks Association in Australia and Romeo Lahey was the driving force behind it, both before its formation and for almost the rest of his life. Romeo Lahey was voted in as president and Arthur Groom the secretary.

During their discussions within the NPAQ the two men found they shared similar ideas for the provision of lodges, guest houses or huts close to national parks throughout Queensland, but particularly Lamington. A partnership began between 42-year-old Romeo Lahey and 25-year-old Arthur Groom. Lahey attempted to buy property owned by George D Rankin at Mount Roberts (now Binna Burra Lodge) in 1920. In December 1932 an option was obtained from George Rankin at a cost of £1 for three months. He ended up extending his offer, without extra cost, for one year. In 1933 Lahey, Groom and four others formed a limited company, Queensland Holiday Resorts Ltd, to provide tourist facilities and accommodation in beauty spots throughout Queensland and as far as possible to assist in preserving such in their natural state in accordance with the ideals of the NPAQ. As shares sold slowly due to the Depression it was decided to organise camps at Binna Burra in order to promote the company.

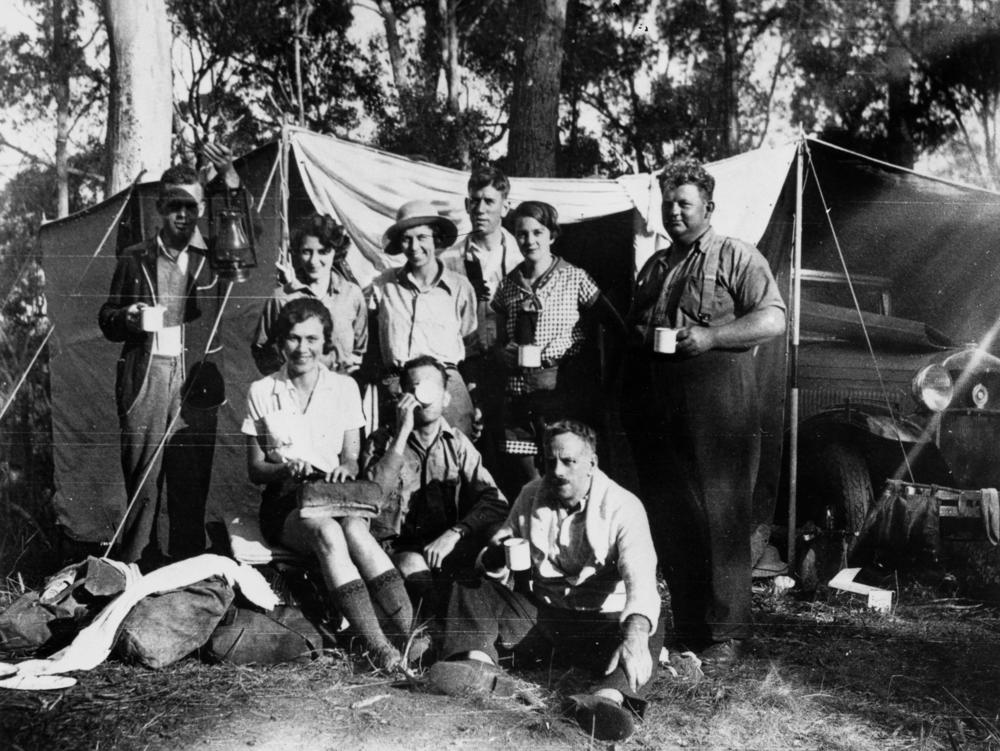
On a camping trip at Binna Burra, ca. 1935

One camp was arranged for one month over the Christmas period of 1933. Accommodation was in tents, a cook supplied meals and there were daily guided picnics into the National Park - all for five shillings a day. The directors hoped that if attendance was good the company would be floated. The limit of 40 was booked out within days so the number was raised to 80. The problem of carting luggage was overcome with the help of Walter Muller (Old Bill) who was to become an identity at Binna Burra for many years. He also worked for the Lahey family company in the Canungra sawmill and on associated roadwork. The weather was mild on the first few days of the camp, however on Boxing Day there was a cyclonic storm that did not let up until after the New Year. Although everything became sodden the campers would not hear of closing the camp down. The camp was extended a further two weeks to a total of six allowing for a week or two of fine weather. During the first Christmas camp a hoop pine tree was planted by Romeo Lahey and used as a Christmas tree. The ceremony was repeated at the 50th anniversary of the camp at Christmas 1983.

On 3 March 1934 Queensland Holiday Resorts Limited, with 97 subscribers and 1880 allotted shares, was incorporated. A flying fox was erected soon afterwards using the engineering knowledge of Romeo Lahey and fellow director Lewis Day and Old Bill's previous experience in the coalmining valleys of New South Wales. It consisted of a huge wheel, the whim, laid horizontally at the top of the rise, pulled round by draughthorse to draw a heavy-duty cable on which baggage was strung for its ascent, about 150 metres (490 ft). At night it was festooned with lanterns. The base of the flying fox was a large tallow wood tree, which is still extant, near the Mains Road toilet facilities, about 1.6 kilometres (0.99 mi) down the road from the lodge. The top pulley and loading/unloading point was right at the (now) concrete edging just west of recent barbecue facilities. A large eucalypt pointing north-west is thought to be the anchor for the top pulley. The flying fox operated until March 1947 when a road was completed to the lodge, largely by the efforts of Queensland Holiday Resorts Ltd after two years of discussion with the Main Roads Commission. The road became all weather in 1951 when it was taken over by the Main Roads Commission and it was laid with bitumen in 1969.

In 1934, Romeo Lahey bought Leighton House, a boarding house built by the family company in 1902 in Canungra. It was dismantled and brought up to Binna Burra by packhorse and became the dining and recreation room. It is currently used as the reception room. By Easter 1934, the first hut was nearly finished. It had tallow-wood slab walls and a stringybark shingle roof. The 56 guests who arrived for Easter were housed in tents.

Building was difficult as most supplies had to be brought up from Brisbane or Canungra without the benefit of a vehicle road. However, by the first shareholders meeting in October 1934 the lodge consisted of a dining room, kitchen, store, staff dining room, bathrooms and lavatories, flooring and tables for the tents and one dormitory slab cabin. By November staff quarters were built and the first slab cabin constructed for guests. By the second annual shareholders meeting in November 1935, two more slab cabins accommodating 22 people had been completed. By 1939 there was cabin accommodation for 54.

Romeo Lahey based his slab hut design on buildings he had seen in Victoria. They were cheap to build because all materials came from the property. They followed an early style of Australian housing and fitted in with the natural environment, consistent with the philosophy of Binna Burra.

In 1935 Arthur Groom sought permission to build a home on the far side of the saddle from the lodge. It was ready for habitation the following year. Following his divorce from his wife Marjorie, Groom married Isla in 1949, and they continued to live in the cottage. After Groom's death in 1953, the cottage was predominantly used as a staff cabin until 1980.

A sawmill was constructed for cutting timber for firewood used to heat water for the lodge. It operated in the early 1950s and during this time two slab cabins were also built (Cabins 30 and 31 - one building that was originally three rooms, made into two much later). Ensuite facilities were also later provided. The mill was run by Wallace McIntyre who was to be appointed manager on Arthur Groom's death. A Rustin Hornsby diesel engine powered the generator and the sawmill. The sawmill is currently being renovated and reconstructed as an interpretative device for guests.

Approximately half a hectare was cleared for a vegetable garden to service the lodge in the early years of its operation. To the west of the vegetable garden was an area known Bellbird Clearing. Adjacent to Bellbird Clearing is an area now used as a ropes course as part of the guest activities. The flying fox also passes through Bellbird Clearing.

On 3 February 1957, a memorial to Arthur Groom was unveiled by Mr Victor Grenning, Director of Forests. Supporters of Binna Burra had donated funds which enabled the memorial to be built on a grassy slope immediately in front of the entrance to the main border track at the Binna Burra end of Lamington National Park. Professor Robert Percy Cummings of the University of Queensland designed the basalt stone wall and the seat of rosewood, obtained from the property and adzed by Gus Kouskos, and Romeo Lahey designed the brass plaque. The memorial rests close to Arthur Groom's original home overlooking Nixon's Creek and the Numinbah Valley.

One of the features of Binna Burra is the Friends of Binna Burra (FOBBs). Almost since its inception the loyal lodge guests have been keen to improve the site by donating their own time. In many instances this has been rewarded by free accommodation, such as a weekend stay where the guest works one day and has the other for recreation. One such guest, Winifred (Win) Bristow, has been involved with the lodge for over 40 years of her life. She first came to the lodge as a guest in 1940 with her husband and two children. Following her husband's death in 1957, Win visited Binna Burra frequently. Her keen interest in plants led to Tony Groom approaching her in 1967 with a view to establishing a garden in between the terraces of cabins which, for many years, had been a repository for workmen's rubbish from building projects and items some guests no longer wanted. Win used her own garden tools until 1980 when Binna Burra purchased a set. She attended to the garden four times a year on specific occasions and for part of her Christmas holiday visit. By 1982 the overall plants in the garden had reached 672. Win Bristow received recognition for her efforts with a presentation in March 1984, and a plaque has been placed by the FOBBs in the walkway between the terraces of cabins, commemorating her efforts.

In 1980 Arthur Groom's former house was refurbished and extended for use as the headquarters of the Environmental Study Centre. The Lamington Natural History Association (LNHA) was created in 1975, a combined operation of Binna Burra, O'Reilly's and the National Parks and Wildlife Service. Eventually it split into two chapters, one at each resort.

The LNHA headquarters is located at the Environmental Study Centre. Officially opened in 1977, the Centre used an innovations grant from the Schools Commission to provide facilities for school camps. In 1980 the Centre occupied Arthur Groom's former house, renovated to allow for the director's office, a workroom and accommodation for 36 children. In the same year, a full-time teacher was appointed to run the centre and to develop special teaching programmes for study of the national park. The LNHA became the first such association in Australia to employ full-time staff.

In 1997 an unusual adventure playground was constructed to help children interact with the natural environment. The playground was devised by specialist toy and play equipment designer, Kate Bishop, who had worked extensively with blind and visually impaired children. The playground is divided into six main activity centres which radiate from a central entry point (designed to represent the sun) along pathways simulating the sun's rays. The first area is a micro-environment for children up to five years with a sensory path, a scratch-and-sniff forest, a cubby house and logs and trees to climb on. For children up to 12 years there is a predator-and-prey activity area. There is also a three-dimensional nutrients maze where children take on the role of a nutrient, moving up and down or backwards and forwards over bridges, ladders and on swings, until they find their way to the central tree and travel up the trunk to nourish leaves and flowers. Other activity centres include a water cycle area which demonstrates how poisons impact on the environment; an area of logs, caves and tree stumps where they can create their own games; and an outdoor stage for games which illustrate what has been learnt in the other areas.

Aesthetic responses to Binna Burra have captured its distinctive physical features. Works evoke the feeling of being deep within the rainforest amidst any of the numerous waterfalls or looking out from mountain to mountain. Icons of the region are Egg Rock and Turtle Rock and the McPherson Range all of which have inspired aesthetic works for more than six decades. Internationally acclaimed poet Rodney Hall wrote his 1970 poem about Binna Burra and important Queensland-born artists such as Vida Lahey depicted this region as did the international artist Lois Beumer in her watercolour Rainforest Tangle 1986. Artists camps were held in the 1930s in order to take advantage of the inspiration afforded by the scenic views. Arthur Groom wrote his 1949 work One Mountain After Another about Binna Burra.

The adjacent McPherson Range which contains Cavern Falls, Triple Falls and Tooloona Creek inspired a number of well known photographers including Arthur Groom, Doug Spowart and the early intrepid photographer, Charles Ernest Stanley Fryer. Romeo Lahey also took plate glass photographs at the outset of World War I, as an adjunct to his campaign for the area to be reserved as a national park. The nationally acclaimed landscape paintings of the area by William Robinson further illustrate the significance of this whole Lamington region in terms of aesthetic value as does Raymond Curtis' 1989 orchestral work Journey Among Mountains.

On Friday afternoon, 6 September 2019, all guests and staff at Binna Burra Lodge were evacuated as a major bushfire advanced on Beechmont and Lamington National Park. Early on Sunday morning, 8 September 2019, the bushfire devastated the heritage listed lodge and cabins and caused damage to two of the Skylodge buildings. A majority of the Skylodges survived the fire, as well as the camp ground, the tea-house, groom's Cottage, the Barn, the Pottery Shed and the one cabin opposite the Barn. Major roadworks were undertaken and were scheduled for completion in March 2020, but this was continuously pushed out until the end of August 2020. The remaining assets of Binna Burra were initially planned to be reopened in April, then May, then June, then July, then August and then September 2020. Controlled road access occurred after the first visitors returned to the Binna Burra side of Lamington National Park on 1 September 2020.

Established after the 2019 bushfire devastation at Beechmont and Binna Burra, BINNA BURRA FOUNDATION LIMITED is an Australian Public Company, registered with the Australian Business Number (ABN): 87639027419 and Australian Company Number: 639027419. It was incorporated on 11 February 2020 and was added to the ABN register on 11 February 2020, the same date it was registered for Goods and Services Tax (GST).

On 8 September 2020, to mark the one year anniversary of the bushfire, Scenic Rim Regional Council Mayor, Greg Christensen joined Binna Burra Chairperson, Steve Noakes and Uncle Ted representing the Yugumbeh language traditional owners for a healing/smoking ceremony and the opening of the Bushfire Gallery in the Barn. In September 2020, the Bushwalker's Bar was opened at Groom's Cottage. A year later it became part of the 'Bushwalker's Precinct' that included the Bushwalkers Bunkhouse, the Heritage Reading room and Australia's most detailed chronology of incorporated Bushwalking Clubs/Associations from all states.New Bushwalker's Bar at Binna Burra.

In May 2021, for the first time in the nine decades Binna Burra Lodge had more women than men on its Board of Directors. Also in September 2021, Binna Burra was selected as a finalist in the Resilient Australia Awards for its response and recovery efforts over the past two years since the devastating bushfire destroyed the heritage listed lodge on Sunday 8 September 2019.

In November 2021, Dr Renata Buziak was appointed as the inaugural ‘Artist-in-Residence’ on the Binna Burra Cultural Landscape, honouring the legacy of the eminent Queensland artist, Vida Lahey (1882–1968), painter and sister of Romeo Lahey, the co-founder of the National Parks Association of Queensland and Binna Burra Lodge.

Also in November 2021, Binna Burra Lodge welcomed confirmation by Reconciliation Australia on what they described as ‘… a great plan which we are pleased to endorse as a REFLECT RAP.’ Steve Noakes, Chairperson of Binna Burra Lodge said: ‘At Binna Burra we will respect and champion the rights of First Nations peoples. We know reconciliation is an ambitious goal and we're committed to a continuous learning-by-doing process. While the RAP is designed to turn our good intentions into actions that progress reconciliation in our cultural landscape, we acknowledge it is just the first step in our overall reconciliation journey.’

When he tabled the 2022–23 Queensland Budget in Parliament on Tuesday 21 June 2022, the Hon. Cameron Dick, Queensland Treasurer and Minister for Trade and Investment, made the official announcement that the State Government would provide funding support of $18 million to rebuild the lodge and cabins. On Wednesday 22 June 2022 the Board of Binna Burra Lodge Ltd and key senior management and consultants will meet to develop a process for Binna Burra Lodge to: (a) Build back different (b) Build back with better foundations and (c) Build a stronger ‘spirit of Binna Burra’ for new generations.

Australia's Governor-General David Hurley and his wife Linda visited Binna Burra not long after the 2019 bushfires and revisited Binna Burra on Tuesday 25 May 2021. Acknowledging shareholder Suzanne Noakes and former staff member Mark Ayers as representatives of the Beechmont Rural Fire Brigade, the Governor General led the official unveiling of the Local Heroes sculpture – a three panel tribute, acknowledging Australian resilience and spirit. The sculpture is located at the front of the Binna Burra Tea House. (In 2022 local fire-fighter, Suzanne Noakes, became a recipient of the National Medal, Australia's most awarded civilian medal- recognising that during the 2019 bushfires she ‘… risked your life or safety to protect and assist the community in times of emergency or natural disaster.’)

On 24 July 2022, the Board of Directors approved the new Master Plan for Binna Burra. It includes ten 'precincts' for future development.

In November 2022, the Federal Minister for Emergency Management Senator Murray Watt; Scenic Rim Mayor Greg Christensen joined Binna Burra Board, staff and Friends of Binna Burra (FoBBs) volunteers for the official opening of the new Tea House facilities – the extension of the Tea House deck and the construction of showers, toilets, a first aid room and storage areas under the Tea House, the addition of four safari tents to the camping ground and new amenities blocks – at the safari tents and at the base of Mount Roberts. The projects were co-funded by the Australian and Queensland governments through the Local Economic Recovery Program, with a grant of $500,000 auspiced by Scenic Rim Regional Council. A further $107,000 was contributed by Binna Burra, bringing the total project costs to $607,000.

In late April 2023, six new Tiny Wild Houses welcomed guests to a new accommodation experience at Binna Burra.

== Description ==
Binna Burra is located at Beechmont surrounded by the Lamington National Park. Binna Burra comprises a number of components, listed below.

=== Binna Burra Mountain Lodge ===
A large building that was dismantled in Canungra and rebuilt on the site in 1934. Initially it was the dining and recreation room, then the games room. It is currently being used as a reception/lounge/shop. A large kitchen/dining room and upstairs lounge have been added. The accommodation is of slab cabins made from horizontal tallow-wood slabs with massive bedlogs and corner posts with stringybark shingle roofs. There are also cabins, dating from the 1970s, made from prefabricated kits.

=== Binna Burra Mountain Lodge Cabins ===
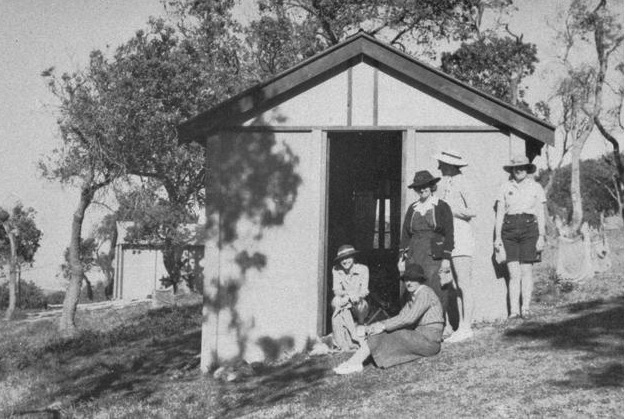
Binna Burra mountain lodge cabins, circa 1940

The older cabins have tallow wood drop slab walls with shingle roofs. The original roofs were stringybark but when renovations have been necessary pre-cut shingles have been used. Some of the slabs, which are up to three feet high and four inches thick, have been carefully dismantled and re-erected as renovations become necessary. Interior designs have changed over the years to meet contemporary needs.

=== Christmas Camp 1933 ===
An area of maintained lawn, known as the Saddle, of approximately one hectare, some 250 metres (820 ft) south of Binna Burra Mountain Lodge.

=== Commemorative Hoop Pines ===
Two hoop pines situated on the western side of the maintained lawn bordering the forest edge 250 metres (820 ft) south of Binna Burra Mountain Lodge adjacent to the Christmas Camp 1933 site.

=== Goat Track ===
The goat track is no longer visible. The track ran from the front of the lawn of the lodge steeply down the crest of the ridge to the west. It was used as a short cut between the lodge and the dump. At its top end it started around about where a survey mark is located on the north-west corner of Mt Roberts. It ran approximately north-west downhill and crossed the loop track. It then turned due west and down, very steeply, zig zagging until it crossed the bitumen on the apex of a sharp corner below Barry's Track. The bottom section of the track then disappeared into rainforest below the bitumen and down to the dump.

=== Flying Fox ===
The only remaining evidence of the flying fox is an old wheel near the northern end of the dining room. The flying fox ran from the dump, at the end of the then main road, where the Information Centre is now, up to the present dining room. The distance from bottom to top was approximately 200 metres (660 ft).

=== Win Bristow Garden Walk ===
The area situated between the terraces of cabins and the lounge/reception, containing a native garden.

=== Engine Room ===
Corrugated iron shed with random rock wall.

=== Arthur Groom Memorial ===
A basalt stone wall and a rosewood seat with a brass plaque dedicated to the memory of Arthur Groom, a man who loved and understood the bush. It is situated immediately in front of the entrance to the main border track at the Binna Burra end of Lamington National Park.

=== Old Vegetable Garden ===
Located to the east of Binna Burra Mountain Lodge, this area was originally used to grow vegetables to supply the lodge, however all that remains are some citrus tree plantings, passionfruit vines and some garden fencing. Binna Burra's first water supply was drawn via a powerful pump from a single well sunk in the bed of the western tributary of Bellbird Creek. A second well was sunk in the late 1940s. Both wells are clearly visible in the old pump shed located in the area. Partially restored engines are also located in the old pump shed.

Another remnant of earlier activities in this area is a hessian and corrugated iron bird hide derived from what was originally a garden shed. Inside is an L-shaped timber bench seat and a bird identification chart. The old shed was used to create the bird hide when Jenny and Glenn Holmes spent time working as naturalists for Binna Burra around 1990.

=== Bellbird Clearing ===
An activity area for lodge guests who undertake ropes courses and abseiling activities is located adjacent to Bellbird Clearing. The flying fox also passes through Bellbird Clearing.

=== Bellbird Lookout ===
Located approximately one kilometre east of Binna Burra Mountain Lodge. The view from this barrier free natural rock formation sweeps across the Nixon's Creek Valley, taking in Ship's Stern, Turtle Rock and Egg Rock.

=== Environmental Playground ===
The recently constructed playground is located approximately 150 metres (490 ft) along the road leading from the lodge on the left hand side and covers an area of approximately 600 square metres.

=== Environmental study centre ===
Once the home of Arthur Groom, the building is located about six hundred metres south of the lodge on the slope rising to the entrance of Lamington National Park. The original slab hut was refurbished and extended in 1980. Upon the reopening of the Binna Burra side of Lamington National Park in September 2020 - one year after the September 2019 bushfire devastation - Groom's Cottage was made into the 'Bushwalker's Bar' (downstairs) and the heritage reading Room (upstairs). The four bunkhouse rooms behind the Cottage were required to be used as storage facilities for food & beverage, house-keeping and maintenance.

19th Romeo Lahey Memorial Lecture (2021). Issues for QLD's national parks from 1930 to the Black Summer Bushfires 2019/2020 (Steve Noakes) === The Romeo Lahey Memorial Lecture honours the principal founder of the National Parks Association of Queensland, who remained president for more than 30 years and was instrumental in convincing the Queensland Government to declare many of the national parks gazetted up to the 1970s. 19th Romeo Lahey Memorial Lecture 2021 Steve Noakes

== Heritage listing ==
Binna Burra Cultural Landscape was listed on the Queensland Heritage Register on 31 December 2002 having satisfied the following criteria.

The place is important in demonstrating the evolution or pattern of Queensland's history.

Binna Burra is important in the course of Queensland's natural and cultural history. The lodge buildings and guest cabins exhibit a high integrity of features significant to the development of a nature-based tourism resort. The design and structure of the resort conform to its aims of providing tourist facilities and accommodation within an area of outstanding beauty, while assisting in preserving such in its natural state. Binna Burra is important in the consolidation and expansion of tourism to Lamington National Park.

The place is important because of its aesthetic significance.

Binna Burra is part of the World Heritage listed Central Eastern Rainforest Reserves of Australia (CERRA) and contains the internationally famous Binna Burra Mountain Lodge which takes advantage of spectacular panoramic views of the surrounding countryside. Aesthetic responses to this place capture its distinctive physical features. Artistic works evoke the feeling of being deep within the rainforest amidst any of the numerous waterfalls or looking out from mountain to mountain. Icons of the region are Egg Rock and Turtle Rock and the McPherson Range all of which have inspired aesthetic works for more than six decades.

Internationally acclaimed poet Rodney Hall wrote his 1970 poem about Binna Burra and important Queensland-born artists such as Vida Lahey depicted this region as did the international artist Lois Beumer in her watercolour Rainforest Tangle (1986). Artists camps were held in the 1930s in order to take advantage of the inspiration afforded by the scenic views. The internationally acclaimed writer and photographer Arthur Groom wrote his 1949 work One Mountain After Another about Binna Burra. The adjacent McPherson Range which contains Cavern Falls, Triple Falls and Tooloona Creek inspired a number of well known photographers including Arthur Groom, Doug Spowart and the early intrepid photographer, Charles Ernest Stanley Fryer. Romeo Lahey also took glass plate photographs at the outset of World War I, as an adjunct to his campaign for the area to be reserved as a national park.

The nationally acclaimed landscape paintings of the area by William Robinson further illustrate the significance of this whole Lamington region in terms of aesthetic value as does Raymond Curtis's 1989 orchestral work Journey Among Mountains. This region has a very high profile in tourist literature covering the area - its aesthetic value widely recognised by tourists and the local community.

The place has a special association with the life or work of a particular person, group or organisation of importance in Queensland's history.

There is a long and strong association of the place with Romeo Lahey who was significant not only in establishing Binna Burra but in having Lamington National Park gazetted in 1915, following early work begun by RM Collins.
