= Vida and Jayne Lahey's House =

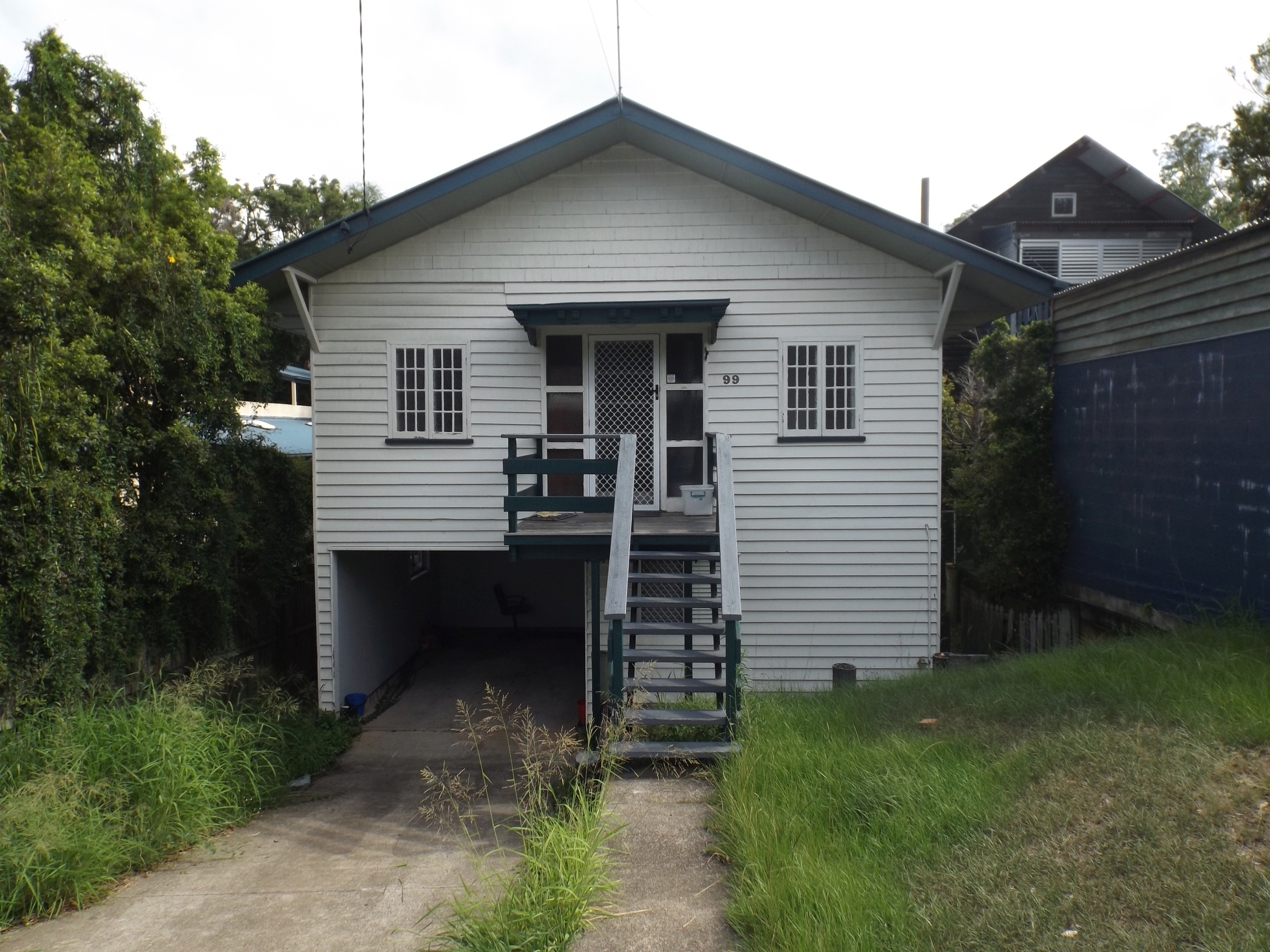
- The house in 2014

- Location within Queensland Location within Australia
- 27.4945°S 152.9986°E
- Location: 99 Sir Fred Schonell Drive, St Lucia, City of Brisbane, Queensland, Australia

History
- Design period: 1919–1930s (interwar period)
- Built: 1920–1946

Site notes
- Architect: Romeo Lahey

Queensland Heritage Register
- Official name: Vida and Jayne Lahey's House, Wonga Wallen
- Type: state heritage (built)
- Designated: 21 October 1992
- Reference no.: 600316
- Significant period: 1920s, 1940s (fabric); 1920–1968 (historical)
- Significant components: residential accommodation – main house

Vida and Jayne Lahey's House is a heritage-listed detached house at 99 Sir Fred Schonell Drive, St Lucia, in the Brisbane, Queensland. It was designed by Romeo Lahey and built from 1920 to 1946. It is also known as Wonga Wallen. It was added to the Queensland Heritage Register on 21 October 1992.

== History ==
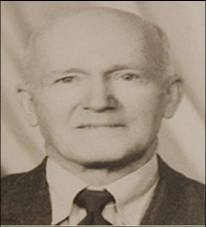
Romeo Lahey

Vida Lahey's house was originally built for Romeo Lahey above Canungra, on a spur of the Darlington Range and was completed in 1920. Later the house was moved from the outskirts to the Canungra township on the hill above the present Catholic Church and occupied by David and his wife, Jane Jemima Lahey née Walmsley, and then moved again by Vida and Jayne Lahey in 1946 to its present block in Sir Fred Schonell Drive, St Lucia.

Francis and Alicia Lahey, Vida and Romeo's grandparents, arrived in Australia with eleven children in 1862 from Ireland. They settled on land by Rocky Waterholes Creek, Salisbury, where they commenced farming but found the land unsuitable. In 1870 Francis, with his older sons and some employees, moved to Pimpama, where the rest of the family moved in 1872 after the sale of the first property. In the early 1880s, the sons of Francis Lahey began investigating the establishment of a timber mill on the Canungra Creek. In 1884, David, the youngest son of Francis and Alicia, father of Vida born in 1882 and later Romeo born in 1887, established a saw and planing mill (Lahey's Canungra Sawmill) in the sparsely populated Canungra area. The mill flourished for many years and provided employment for the local area which grew rapidly as a result. The Lahey family were responsible for the construction of many significant roads and railways in the Canungra area, sometimes contributing substantial proportions of the construction cost.

Following the extension of the railway from Logan Village to Canungra in 1914, the Laheys' mill at Canungra grew into what was thought to be the largest and best-equipped softwood mill in the southern hemisphere. The Lahey family business continued until 1920 when the mill was bought by the War Service Home Commission who acquired timber mills all over the country to meet the vast housing needs of returned soldiers. The mill was operated only for a few years by the WSHC after which time another firm purchased it. David Lahey remained the manager for many years after the mill was sold.

David Lahey and his wife, Jane, had twelve children, Vida being the first born and Romeo the fourth child. Jane and her children moved to Yeronga, Brisbane in 1899 when David sold the Pimpama property. This move allowed opportunities for further education for both the sons and daughters of the family, whilst David remained in Canungra travelling to Brisbane each weekend. The family is listed at addresses including Yeronglea, between Yeronga and Feez Streets and the Brisbane River at Yeronga, Sidney House, in River Road, Toowong and Greylands, Harts Road at Indooroopilly and then the house David Lahey built alongside Laheys' mill at Corinda, also called Wonga Wallen.

Vida Lahey's house was constructed during a period when the Laheys' owned the mill and frequently built houses for employees in Canungra. The house which was originally positioned on the Darlington Spur was designed by Romeo Lahey, who had completed a town planning course at the University of London in 1919, following his service in the Great War. The house, which was to be known as the Wonga Wallen, was constructed using the family timber in 1920.

His extensive experience with timber milling and natural resources interested Romeo Lahey in the conservation of forests and the need for national parks; following his father's example he initiated reafforestation in the Canungra district and successfully lobbied for suitable areas to be declared national parks. In 1930 Romeo became the founding president of the National Parks Association of Queensland and was instrumental in the declaration of the Lamington National Park. He bought and named Lone Pine on the Brisbane River, planning to live there after returning from the First World War. Subsequently, the property was sold to Mr Claude Alexander Miller Reid who developed it as a nature reserve. In 1946 Romeo was one of the founders for the Save the Tree campaign.

Romeo and his wife Alice Sybil Lahey (née Delpratt) remained living at Wonga Wallen for a short time after their marriage in 1920, after which David and Jemima Lahey moved the house into Canungra near the Catholic church for their own use. When David Lahey died in 1942, two years after the death of his wife, he left the house to his two unmarried daughters, Vida and Jayne. The sisters having bought a block of land in what is now Sir Fred Schonell Drive moved the house from Canungra to this site in 1946. Prior to its removal, another sister, Gladys, lived at the house after having nursed her father.

The house was built in the Canungra township with a paved loggia extending along the front of the house, and a separate wing containing the laundry and bathroom facilities which extended along the rear of the house. On its removal to Brisbane, these two elements remained in Canungra and were standing in February 1995, on either side of a more recent house. When moved Wonga Wallen was turned on its side, making the original double front door a side entrance off a new balcony.

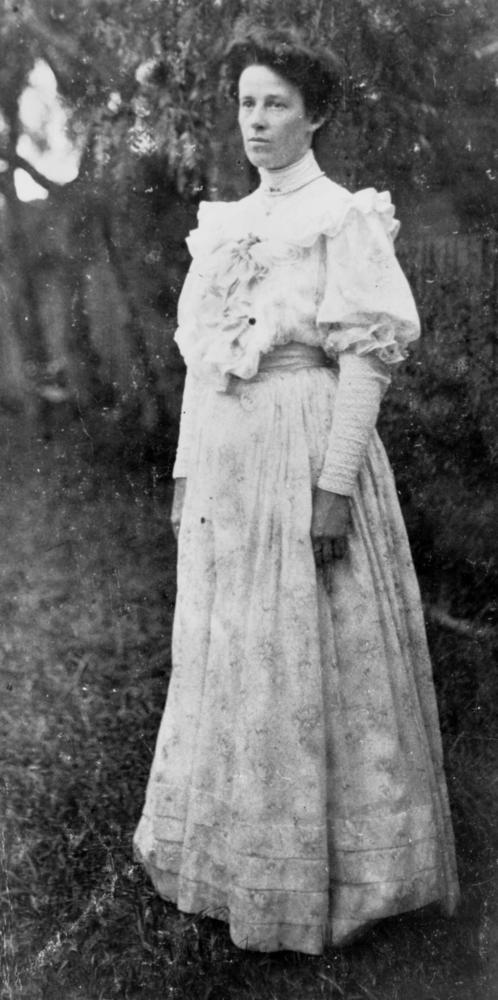
Vida Lahey, ca. 1924

Vida Lahey, born in 1882, was a prominent Queensland artist who exhibited widely from 1902 until 1965, three years before her death. She was one of the first female artists in Queensland, and indeed, Australia, who regarded themselves as professionals and who sought to earn a living from practising their art. Vida pioneered art classes for both children and adults in Queensland; and she and Daphne Mayo were responsible for the foundation of the Queensland Art Fund in 1929, which helped to establish an art library and acquire works of art for the state. Vida was awarded the Society of Artists (NSW) Medal in 1945, in appreciation of good services for the advancement of Australian art, the Coronation Medal in 1953 and in 1958 honoured with an MBE for services to art. Vida is known to have painted at least two paintings of the house, Wonga Wallen, Canungra in the late 1930s and Wonga Wallen Loggia at Canungra in the 1940s both in the collection of Ms Shirley Lahey. Another painting, Bedroom at St Lucia with Dobell portrait, c.1961, was painted by Vida in her St Lucia bedroom.

Vida remained at the house until her death in 1968 when the property was transferred to the sole ownership of her sister Jayne who remained there until a few years before her death in 1982 during which time another sister, Mavis Denholm née Lahey lived in the house. The house was bought from the estate by Ms Iris Conroy in 1984 who subdivided the block and moved the house to one side causing it to be renumbered from 97 to 99 Sir Fred Schonell Drive. This most recent relocation saw the removal of a porch on the eastern side of the building and the house being raised. The ground floor has been filled in to form a garage.

== Description ==
Vida Lahey's house is a two-storeyed timber building with a shallow gable roof of corrugated iron. The gable ends are clad with shingles and the external walls are clad with weatherboard. The building has a rectangular plan, with the short northern elevation forming the dominant facade, on which the centrally located entrance is defined by a small portico supported by curved side brackets and adorned with simple classical details.

The outstanding quality of the clear finished timber joinery and fittings on the interior of Vida Lahey's house is particularly noteworthy. The internal walls are lined with vertically-jointed boards of first-grade timber. Timber boards lining the ceiling are raked to meet the underside of the ceiling joists on the east and west walls of the house. An outstanding feature of the interior is the joists of hoop pine running the full width of the house. Each joist was made from one piece of timber completely free from knots over its long expanse, a rarity today.

Joinery, including a dado rail, architraves, windows and doors, is clear-finished timber darker than the lining timber. The bedrooms and bathroom are accessed from a central entrance hall and living room. The kitchen is within the living room, divided by fitted cupboards and shelving of the same high-quality timber joinery combining pine and cedar. Other timber fittings designed for the interior include several concealed storage cupboards, a wardrobe and other smaller cupboards. The floor is white beech and the walls hoop pine.

== Heritage listing ==
Vida and Jayne Lahey's House was listed on the Queensland Heritage Register on 21 October 1992 having satisfied the following criteria.

The place is important in demonstrating the evolution or pattern of Queensland's history.

The house is significant for its internal timber work, reflecting the involvement of the Lahey family in the timber industry in south east Queensland.

The place is important in demonstrating the principal characteristics of a particular class of cultural places.

Both in workmanship and material, the clear finished timber is outstanding in its quality. It is significant that this timberwork has remained unpainted and in good repair since construction in 1920.

The place has a special association with the life or work of a particular person, group or organisation of importance in Queensland's history.

Vida Lahey's house is significant for its associations with members of the Lahey family who, for varied reasons were important in the history of Queensland. Romeo W. Lahey MBE, who designed the house and originally lived in it, was an early advocate of the Queensland National Parks movement. Romeo's sister Vida, who lived in the house for over twenty years, was an early female artist in Queensland and a key figure in the development of the Queensland Art Gallery and is considered to be one of the most interesting and influential figures in Queensland artistic development. Romeo and Vida's father, David Lahey, together with his brothers, pioneered the timber industry in Canungra encouraging unprecedented growth in the region.
