= Binna Burra (lodge) =

Coordinates: 28°08′32″S 153°06′55″E

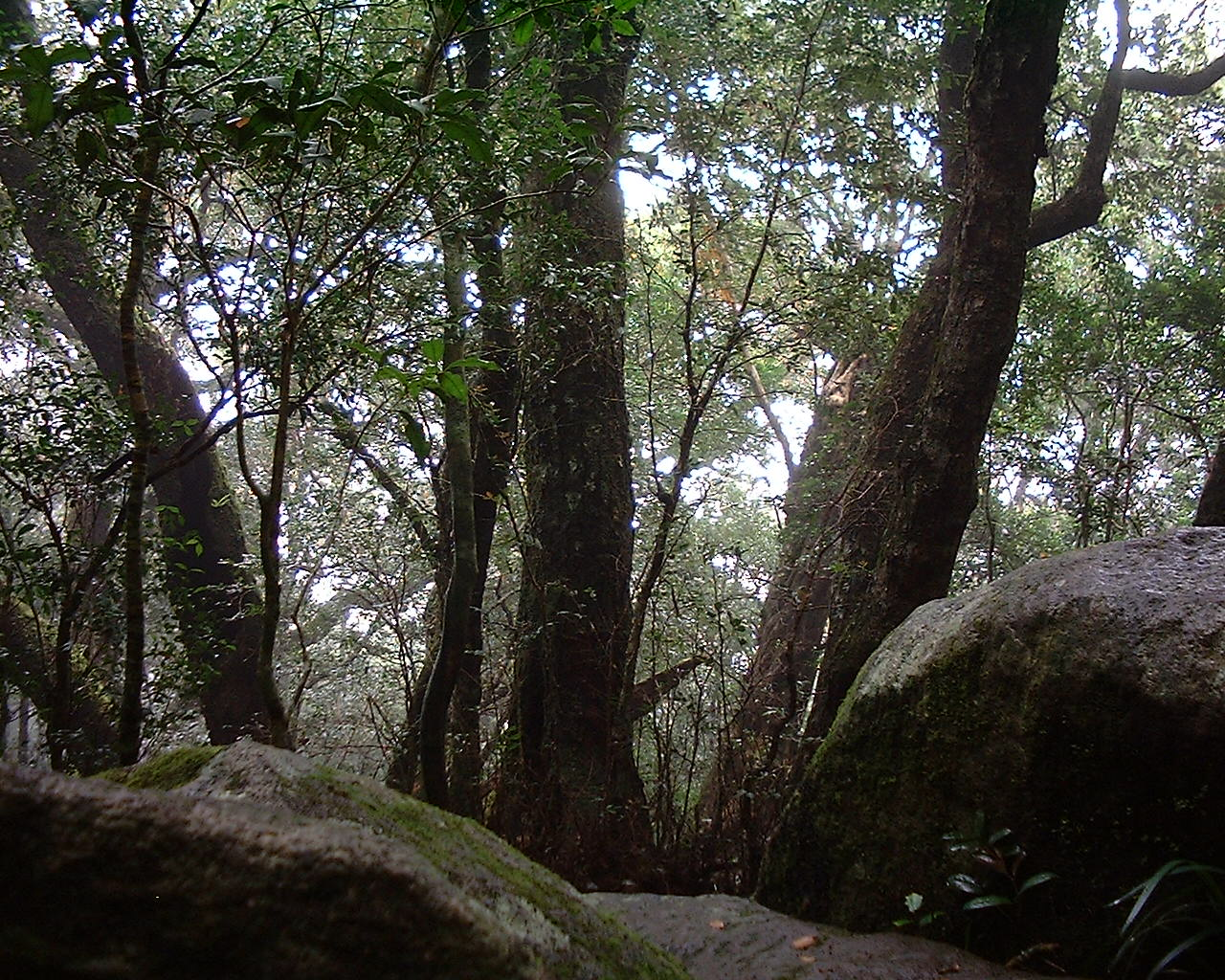
- Antarctic beech trees, 3km from Binna Burra Mountain Lodge
- Interactive map of the Binna Burra area

General information
- Opened: 1933

Binna Burra is a parcel of private land and mountain lodge within the locality of Binna Burra and surrounded by Lamington National Park in Queensland, Australia. It is also a locality in the Scenic Rim Region. The lodge lies in the north-eastern corner of the Lamington Plateau in the McPherson Range, 75 kilometres (47 mi) south of Brisbane in the scenic rim hinterland of the Gold Coast. Binna Burra lies within the catchment of the upper Coomera River.

It's about 30 minute drive up the mountain from Nerang and a similar distance from Canungra. It is marketed as an ecolodge and was one of the first nature based resorts to be established in Australia. In 2000, the resort was the first commercial accommodation provider to be awarded Green Globe Certification in Australia. The lodge and other aspects of the built environment at Binna Burra are listed on the Queensland Heritage Register as the Binna Burra Cultural Landscape. Binna Burra was the first Australian hotel or resort to become signatory to the UN's Global Compact.

In September 2019, the area was devastated by bushfires and the historic lodge was destroyed. After one year of closure, the Binna Burra side of Lamington National Park reopened to the public in September 2020.

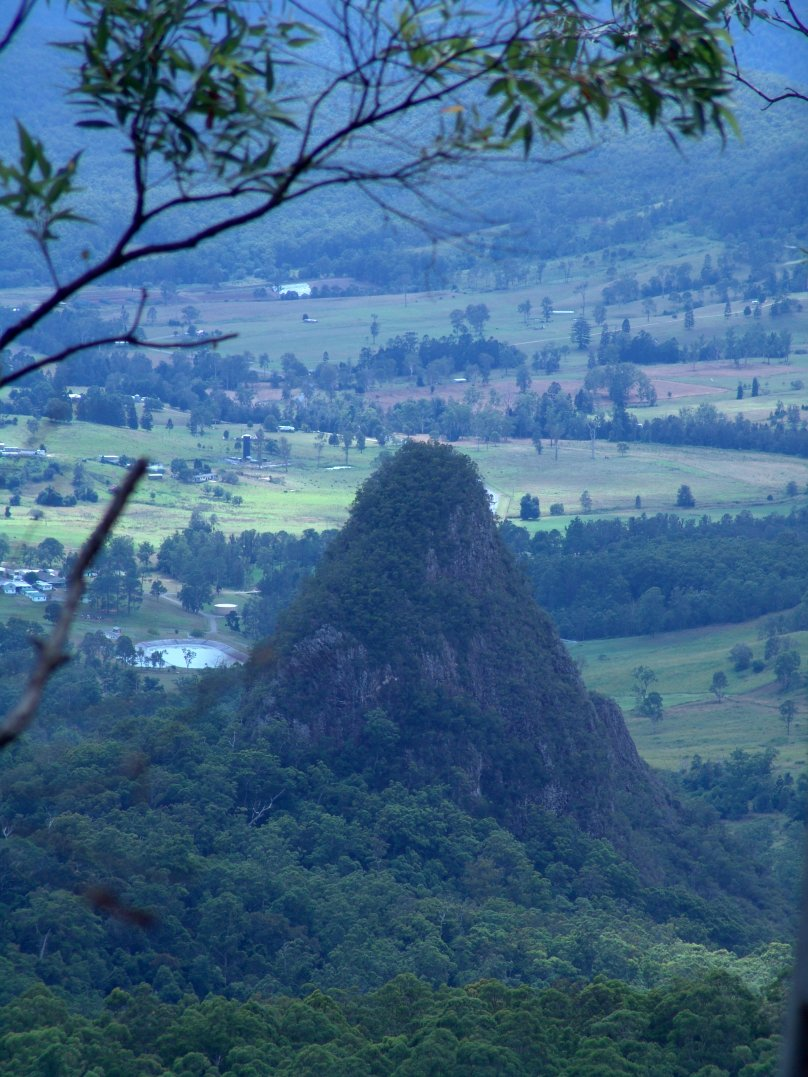
Egg Rock seen from Binna Burra

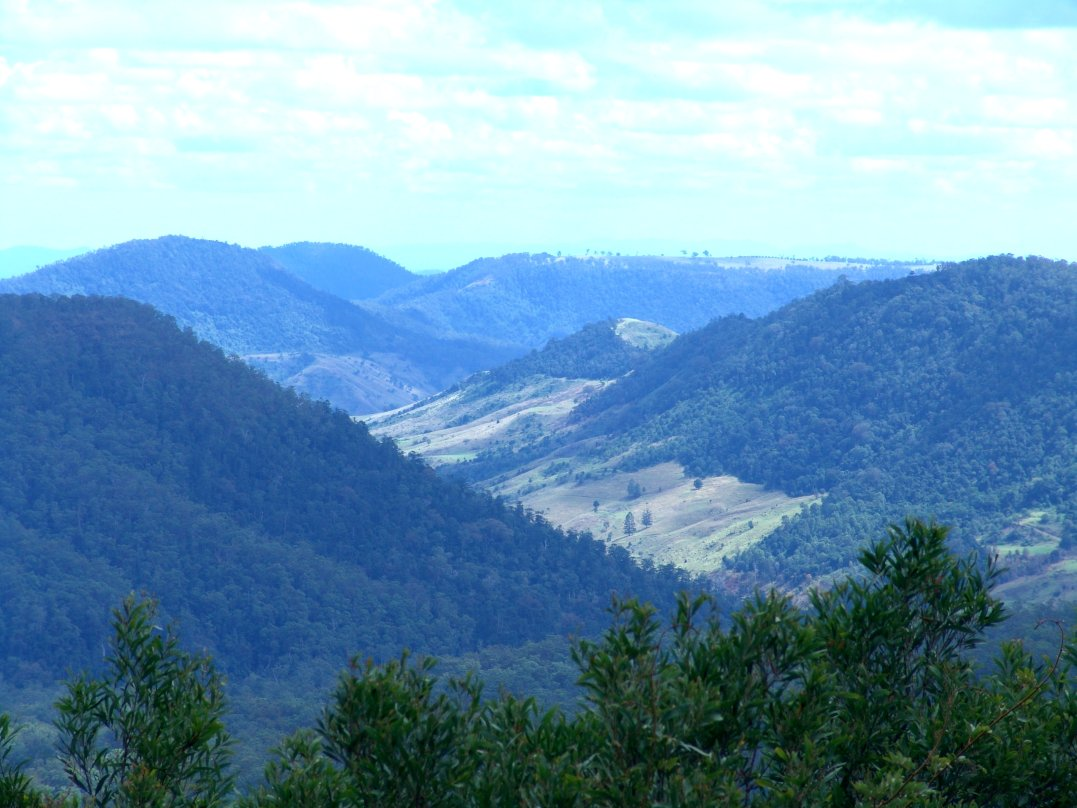
View north of Binna Burra, from the Senses Trail circuit

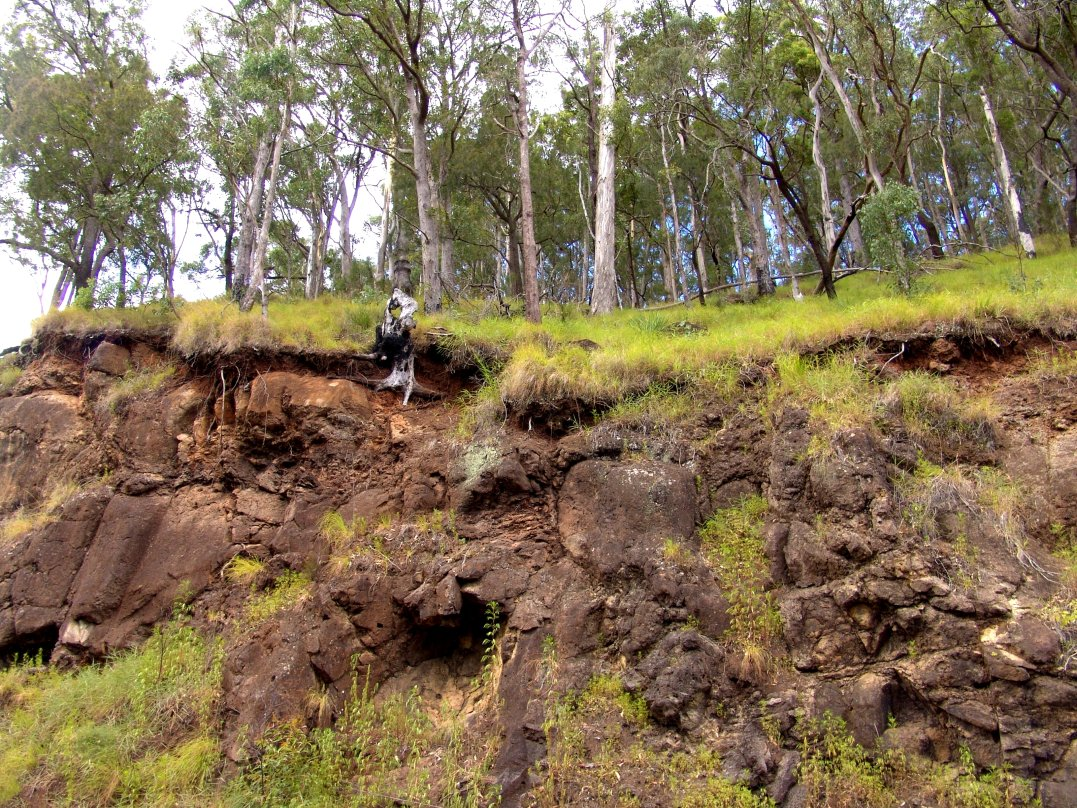
Ancient lava flow - Binna Burra

In August 2024 the Binna Burra Chairman (Steve Noakes) and Vice Chair (Hal Morris) signed the contract with iQConstruct to build a new lodge. The mountain lodge is a drawcard for the Scenic Rim. Binna Burra means "where the Antarctic beech trees grow" in a local Aboriginal language.

== History ==
In 1930, Romeo Lahey and Arthur Groom were leaders in the formation of the National Parks Association of Queensland. Three years later, along with many members of the NPAQ they led the formation of an unlisted public company called Queensland Holiday Resorts, with Binna Burra Lodge becoming the first such facility in their vision to provide access and accommodation adjacent to national parks. From the outset the company aimed to make ecotourism and environmental protection a significant objective under the guidance of one of its founders Romeo Lahey. Binna Burra remained apart from the nearby national park as the properties around were bought by the Queensland Government on an irregular basis, to extend the size of the park.

The main lodge, now destroyed by bushfire, was originally completed in 1933.

Gravel road reached Binna Burra in 1947.

In 2012, facilities were expanded with the construction of 20 modern new apartments to add to the log cabins already accommodating visitors.

In September 2019, the facilities of the lodge, including the original accommodation buildings, reception lounge and dining room, were destroyed in the Queensland bushfires. Guests had been evacuated. The rainforest surrounding the accommodation at Binna Burra is normally fire-resistant.

=== Redevelopment ===
Due to road access repair work, the demolition and repair work at Binna Burra was unable to commence until well into 2020. The Binna Burra campsite, Teahouse café and the Sky Lodge apartments remain undamaged from the bushfire and one year after the bushfires were able to be reopened for business. Reopening occurred in September 2020.

The first new building to be completed since the 2019 bushfires was the Bushfire Pavilion, built in collaboration with Griffith University and the Department of Agriculture and Fisheries. State and federal governments spent $30 million on fixing the only road to the resort.

== Forests ==
The forests in the area are part of the World Heritage site, Gondwana Rainforests of Australia (formerly Central Eastern Rainforest Reserves). The name, Binna Burra, is an Aboriginal word meaning "where the beech tree grows", referring to a stand of Antarctic beech (Nothofagus moorei) growing in the nearby rainforest, as shown in the adjacent image.

The vegetation ranges from subtropical and temperate rainforest to dry eucalypt and open heath. Binna Burra is the northern most extent of the Blue Mountains ash.

== Access ==
Binna Burra Lodge is 11.6 kilometres (7.2 mi) by road south from Beechmont, 27.9 kilometres (17.3 mi) by road south from Canungra, 45.3 kilometres (28.1 mi) by road south-west from Southport, and 105 kilometres (65 mi) south of Brisbane.

Access to Binna Burra is from Beechmont, via a mountainous road not suitable for large caravans. In 2001, 108,551 vehicles were recorded by counters as entering Binna Burra. More recently this figure has increased to around 250,000 visitors per year. Following the bushfires in September 2019, the single access road into Binna Burra was cut off to the public for one year while major roadworks and cliffside scaling was undertaken by the Queensland Department for Main Roads and Transport. The road reopened in September 2020.

== Bushwalking ==
Extending away from the clearing a number of short and long walks, many of which were designed and built by Romeo Lahey during the Great Depression. All of Lahey's track's have a gradient not greater than 10%. Lahey had noticed that the local dairy cows never seemed out of breath. After surveying the animals paths he concluded a ratio of 1:10 for a gradient was best. These graded walking tracks lead to the upper Coomera River and numerous smaller creeks, Coomera Gorge, Coomera Falls amongst many other waterfalls. To the east is the Ship Stern Range and Dave's Creek circuit and the all-day hike along the Coomera Track. In late 2020, a Bushwalker's Bar was established inside the historic Groom's Cottage at Binna Burra.

The Ship's Stern circuit is a trail that follows a Tweed Volcano rhyolite formation known as Ship's Stern Range. Daves Creek circuit allows walkers to explore heath along an escarpment above Numinbah Valley.

== In popular culture ==
Binna Burra was featured on the third season of The Mole. An assignment involved the contestants having to travel up to Binna Burra, whilst on the way answering questions that would help them in succeeding in the assignment. Wildfire devastation inspires 'solidarity tourism' for a nationally significant heritage tourism icon. One year after bushfires devastated Binna Burra Lodge, the response and recovery efforts have been acknowledged by a leading international expert in cultural tourism. Based in Boston Massachusetts (USA), Meg Pier is a highly recognised international contributor to cultural tourism. 'At a time when the world's tourism seems to be going down in flames, the story of Binna Burra Lodge in Australia offers inspiration and hope. Binna Burra Lodge also provides powerful lessons in the meaning of the term "cultural landscape" and how that designation is inextricably interwoven with the phenomenon of community. The 'Good Tourism Blog': 'Lessons in resilience: Binna Burra's rise from the ashes' Sustainable Tourism Recovery Lessons: Binna Burra Lodge - Heritage Lodge Recovery Story, Reimagining Sustainable Hospitality with Community Values Binna Burra Lodge (Lamington National Park, Australia) offers lessons on sustainable tourism recovery, from its experience recovering from wildfire damages and dealing with the COVID-19 crisis.

== See also ==
- Arthur Groom
- O'Reilly's Guesthouse
- Protected areas of Queensland
