= Vida Lahey =

Australian artist (1882–1968)

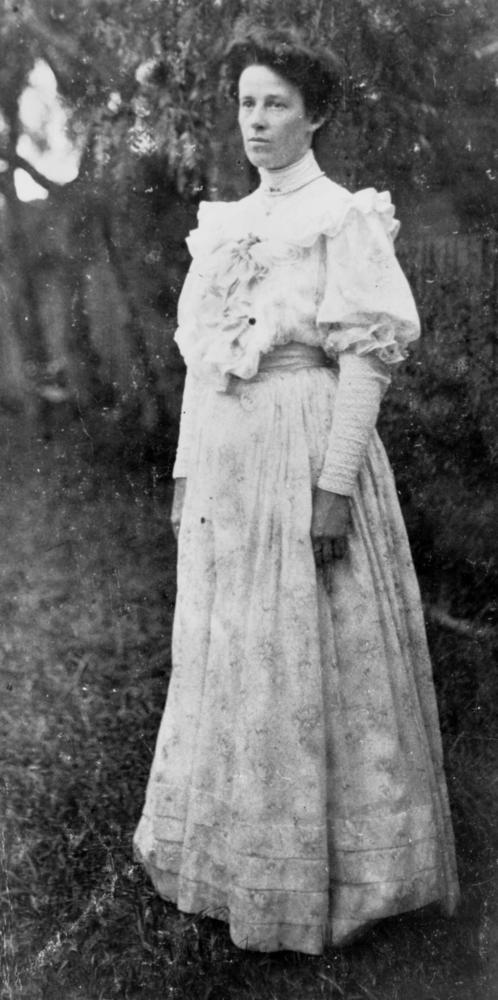
- Vida Lahey in Queensland, c. 1924
- Born: Frances Vida Lahey; 26 August 1882; Pimpama, Queensland, Australia
- Died: 29 August 1968 (aged 86); Wonga Wallen, St Lucia, Queensland, Australia
- Resting place: St Lucia, Queensland
- Education: Brisbane Central Technical College and National Gallery School, Melbourne
- Known for: still life; landscape; portrait; art education
- Notable work: Canungra, c.1930 Wonga Wallen c.1940 Bedroom at St. Lucia with Dobell Portrait c.1961 Monday Morning in Queensland Art Gallery
- Awards: Society of Arts (NSW) Medal, 1945; Coronation Medal, 1953; MBE, 1958

Frances Vida Lahey MBE (/vaɪdə leɪiː/ VEYE-də LAY-ee; 26 August 1882 – 29 August 1968) was a prominent artist in Queensland, Australia. She exhibited widely from 1902 until 1965.

== Early life ==
Frances Vida Lahey was born on 26 August 1882 at Pimpama, Queensland, the daughter of Irish-born farmer David Lahey and his wife Jane Jemima (née Walmsley). She had eleven siblings including conservationist Romeo Lahey. She attended Goytelea School at Southport, and later studied painting at the Brisbane Technical College under Godfrey Rivers. Her uncle financed a trip to New Zealand in 1902 which inspired some of her earliest exhibited works, as well as helping to set her up to study in Melbourne. She studied at the National Gallery School, Melbourne under Bernard Hall and Frederick McCubbin in 1905 and again in 1909.

During World War I, she travelled to London to be in proximity to her brothers and cousins who were serving with the AIF, as well as to study art when she could. She assisted with the volunteer war effort. Following the War, she studied with Frances Hodgkins, in the Colarossi in Paris and in Italy before returning to Australia in 1921.

== Career ==
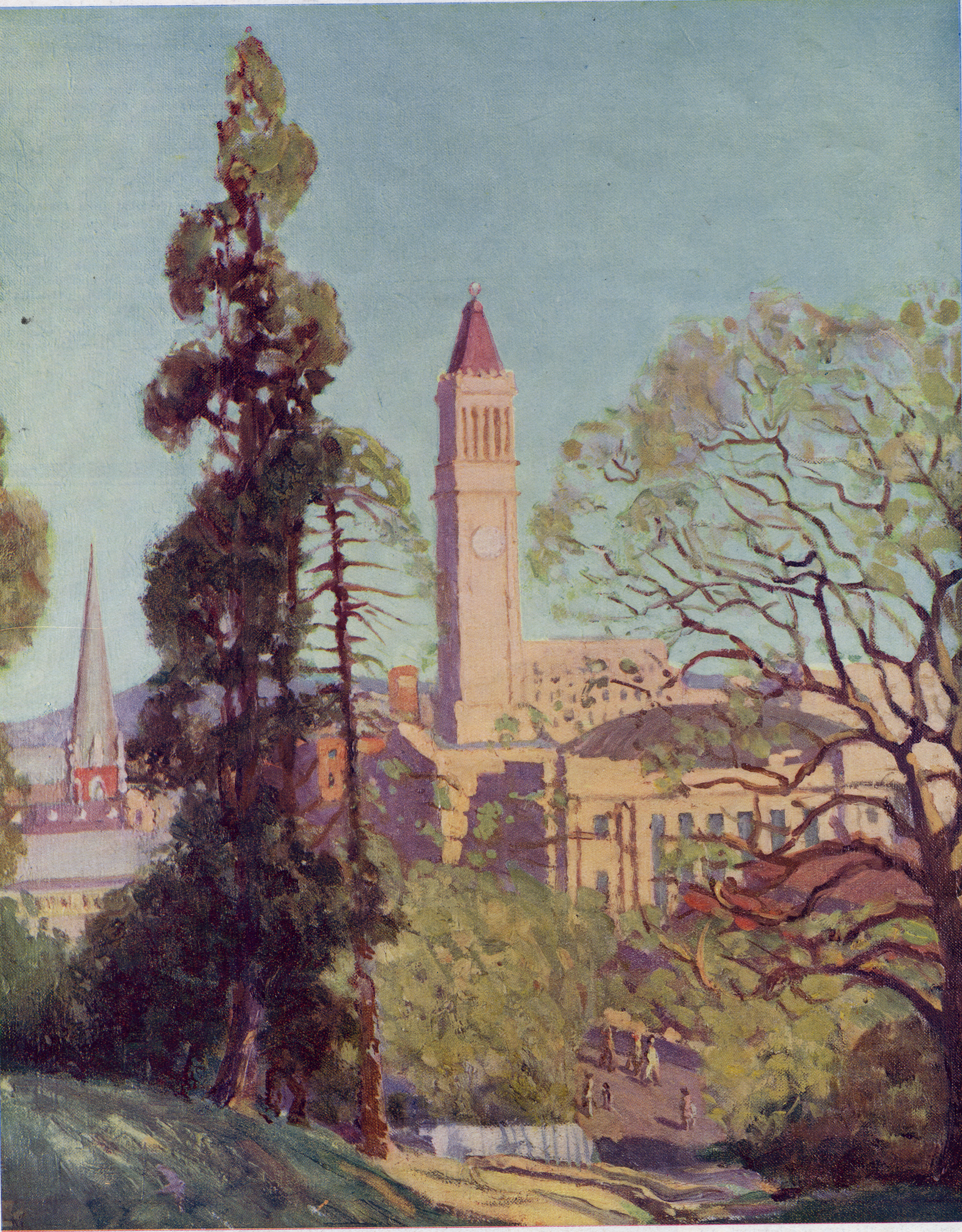
Watercolour painting by Vida Lahey featuring Brisbane City Hall as seen from Albert Park with the Albert Street Methodist Church steeple to the left (1936)

Vida Lahey was one of the first female artists in Queensland and Australia, who regarded themselves as professionals and who sought to earn a living from practising their art. Lahey pioneered art classes for both children and adults in Queensland; and she and Daphne Mayo were responsible for the foundation of the Queensland Art Fund in 1929, which helped to establish an art library and acquire works of art for the state. She travelled to Europe in 1927 for further opportunities to study art. In 1937 Lahey became a foundation member of, and exhibited with, Robert Menzies' anti-modernist organisation, the Australian Academy of Art. Lahey was awarded the Society of Artists (NSW) Medal in 1945, in appreciation of good services for the advancement of Australian art, the Coronation Medal in 1953 and in 1958 honoured with an MBE for services to art.

Lahey was a long-term active member of the Royal Queensland Art Society (known up to 1926 as the Queensland Art Society) and served on its committee for several years.

== Later life ==
Vida Lahey's house Wonga Wallen was originally built for her brother Romeo Lahey in Canungra, on a spur of the Darlington Range and was completed in 1920. Later the house was moved from the outskirts to the Canungra township on the hill above the present Catholic Church and occupied by her parents David and Jane Jemima Lahey, and then moved again by Vida and her sister Jayne Lahey in 1946 to its present block in Sir Fred Schonell Drive, St Lucia in Brisbane.

Lahey remained at Wonga Wallen in St Lucia until her death on 29 August 1968 and was cremated. Wonga Wallen was transferred to the sole ownership of her sister Jayne who remained there until a few years before her death in 1982 during which time another sister, Mavis Denholm (née Lahey), lived in the house. The house was listed on the Queensland Heritage Register on 21 October 1992.

== Works ==
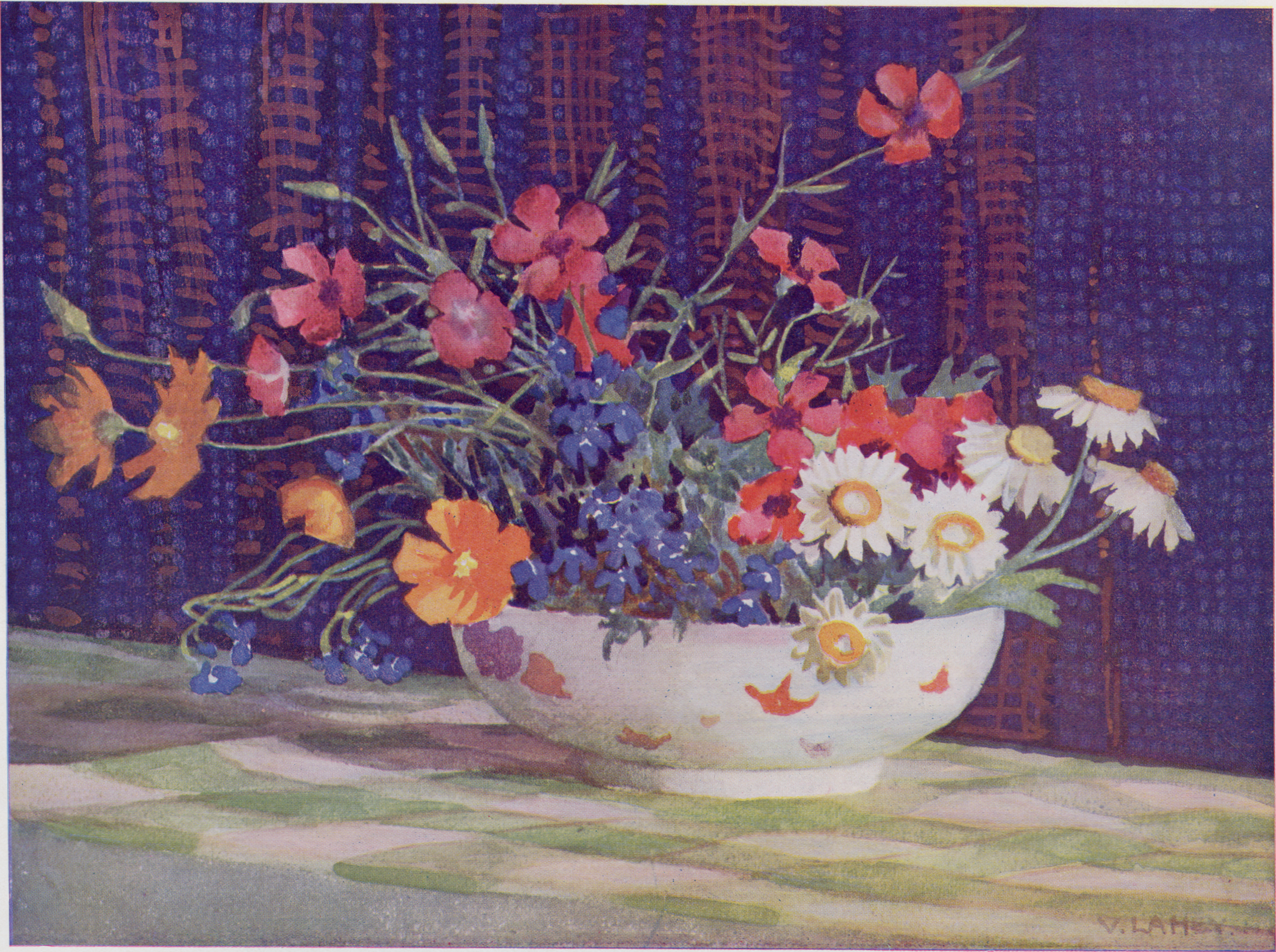
A bowl of flowers, watercolour by Vida Lahey (1939)

Lahey is widely known for her oil paintings, particularly her 1912 painting Monday morning which depicts the Lahey family home. The painting launched her career upon its exhibition at the Queensland Art Society's annual exhibition.

Lahey is known to have painted at least two paintings of Wonga Wallen, Canungra in the late 1930s and Wonga Wallen Loggia at Canungra in the 1940s both in the collection of Ms Shirley Lahey. Another painting, Bedroom at St Lucia with Dobell portrait, c.1961, was painted by Vida in her St Lucia bedroom.

== Collections ==
Vida Lahey is represented in major Australian art galleries, including the National Gallery of Australia. Her painting Monday Morning is part of the Queensland Art Gallery's collection.

== Exhibitions ==
- Songs of Colour: The Art of Vida Lahey, Queensland Art Gallery, Brisbane, 1989.
- Know My Name: Australian Women Artists 1900 to Now, National Gallery of Australia, Canberra, 2020–2021.

== Oral history ==
An oral history interview with Lahey, recorded in 1965, is available at the National Library of Australia.
