= Arthur Groom (writer) =

Australian journalist

Arthur Groom (11 December 1904 – 14 November 1953) was an Australian writer, conservationist, journalist and photographer, the son of Arthur Champion Groom.

== Early career ==
Arthur Groom was raised on the cattle station Rosabelle Downs in Queensland and worked as a jackaroo and journalist. In 1926, he went to Brisbane to write for The Sunday Mail. In 1930 he became the first honorary secretary of the National Parks Association of Queensland and was active in the promotion of national parks and environmental protection until his death. With Romeo Lahey, he established Binna Burra Lodge on the edge of the Lamington National Park, in southeast Queensland, in 1933. Though found medically unfit for service in World War II, he trained soldiers from the Canungra Army Base in jungle warfare. He was known for his almost legendary ability to walk long distances, and his sense of humour.

== Writing career ==
Groom wrote frequently for Walkabout and other magazines, often accompanying stories with his own photographs. He visited Central Australia and the Hermannsburg Mission in 1946 and 1947 and wrote about his experiences in I Saw a Strange Land. He also published a history of Lamington National Park and the Scenic Rim region in 1949. His last book, Wealth in the Wilderness, was based on the cattle industry of the Northern Territory and Western Australia. His published works reveal a great love for the Australian landscape and were illustrated with his own photographs. A selection of his photos is kept in the National Library of Australia digital collection. Groom's papers, including the manuscript of an unpublished novel, are also held at the National Library of Australia.

== Books ==
- Groom, Arthur (1950). I Saw A Strange Land: Journeys in Central Australia. Angus & Robertson, Sydney.
- Groom, Arthur (1951). One Mountain After Another. Angus & Robertson, Sydney.
- Groom, Arthur (1953). Flood Waters. Unpublished.
- Groom, Arthur (1955). Wealth in the Wilderness. Angus & Robertson, Sydney.

== Magazine articles ==
- Australian Geographical Society (1 October 1947), "Ormiston Gorge Central Australia (1 October 1947)", Walkabout, 13 (12), Australian National Travel Association, ISSN 0043-0064
- Australian Geographical Society (1 April 1947), "I know a dark green forest (1 April 1947)", Walkabout, 13 (6), Australian National Travel Association, ISSN 0043-0064
- Australian Geographical Society (1 February 1951), "POINT LOOKOUT (QUEENSLAND) (1 February 1951)", Walkabout, 17 (2), Australian National Travel Association, ISSN 0043-0064

== Last days ==
Arthur Groom died in Melbourne in 1953.

== See also ==
- Australian outback literature of the 20th century
