= Romeo Lahey =

Australian businessman, civil servant and conservationist (1887-1968)

Romeo Lahey M.B.E
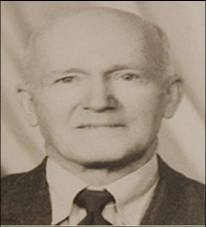
- Born: Romeo Watkins Lahey; 2 June 1887; Pimpama, Queensland, Australia
- Died: 26 October 1968 (aged 81); Yeronga, Brisbane, Queensland, Australia
- Citizenship: Australian
- Education: University of Sydney
- Occupations: Army officer; engineer; timber merchant; national parks advocate
- Parents: David Lahey (father); Jane Jemima (mother)

Romeo Watkins Lahey, M.B.E, (2 June 1887 – 26 October 1968) was an Australian businessman, civil servant and conservationist.

== Early life ==
Romeo Watkins Lahey was born 2 June 1887 in Pimpama, Queensland, Australia. His father was David Lahey, an Irish-born farmer and timber miller, and his mother was Jane Jemima (née Walmsley), a homemaker. Lahey was one of twelve children, with three sisters and eight brothers: Frances Vida Lahey, Noel Alaric Lahey and Percival Ethelburt Lahey, Oswald Lahey, Jerome Lahey Jayne Lahey, Mavis Denholme (nee Lahey)

== Education ==
Lahey received his education at Pimpama State school, Junction Park State School, Normal School and Brisbane Grammar School; his first job was as a clerk at AMP Limited. Lahey studied civil engineering at the University of Sydney. After World War I, he took up town planning at London University.

== Career ==
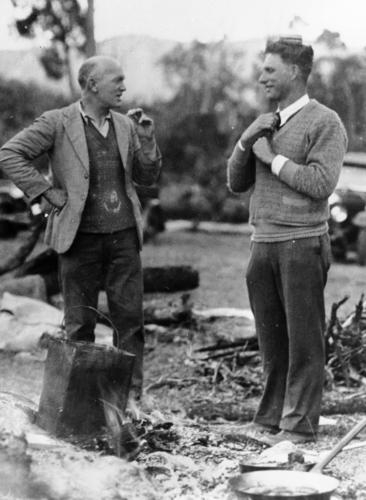
Romeo Lahey with Arthur Groom

A keen explorer, Lahey enjoyed roaming the forests with his spare time. His father, David Lahey, also one of Tamborine Shire Council's councillors, inspired Lahey to be a conservationist. He had exhibited a high degree of conservationism from a young age. Recognising the value in preserving the forests, he tirelessly campaigned, which resulted in the establishment of Lamington National Park in July 1915.

In April 1930, Lahey founded the National Parks Association of Queensland (NPAQ), where he served as president till his death in 1968. Lahey, NPAQ secretary Arthur Groom and a few supporters of theirs are credited for founding Queensland Holiday Resorts Limited and establishing Binna Burra Mountain Lodge, located next to Lamington National Park.

Lahey was appointed Member of the Most Excellent Order of the British Empire in 1960.

== Military service ==
In World War I, he enlisted in the army, serving with the 3rd Divisional Engineers, initially attaining the rank of second lieutenant. He was promoted to lieutenant in January 1917. Lahey served on ship A29 HMAT Suevic. During World War II, Lahey served again in the army, ranking as a major.

== Personal life ==
In 1919, after returning to Australia, Romeo Watkins Lahey married Sybil Delpratt, the youngest daughter of JH Delpratt, in St John's Cathedral, Brisbane. They had three children: David, Alison and Ann.

== Death ==
On 26 October 1968, Lahey died at his home in Yeronga, Brisbane, Queensland, Australia. He was cremated with Anglican rites.

== Legacy ==
In 1970, the Queensland Government opened a lookout named Kamurun in his memory at Lamington National Park.
